= High school radio =

Radio stations located at high schools

High school radio are radio stations located at high schools and usually operated by its students with faculty supervision. The oldest extant high school AM radio station is AM 1450 KBPS in Portland, Oregon.

The oldest extant high school FM radio stations began broadcasting in the 1940s, with the advent of the 88–108 MHz FM radio band. Because the 88-92 MHz region was dedicated to non-commercial broadcasting, this allowed for schools to fairly easily obtain licenses from the FCC. The oldest HS station on FM is WNAS in New Albany, Indiana, which started broadcasting in May 1949. The station is still broadcasting today. WHHS, Haverford Senior High School's radio station also started in 1949, located in Havertown, Pennsylvania. As the FM band increased in listenership in the next few decades, the number of HS stations increased with it. In addition to this number, there have always been untold numbers of unlicensed stations using carrier current (popular through the 1970s), extremely low power or "Part 15" stations, and closed-circuit broadcasting. Many of the licensed stations are assigned to suburban school districts in a few large metro areas: Chicago, Indianapolis, Detroit, Boston, Philadelphia, Seattle and to a lesser extent San Francisco and Cleveland.

After a steady decline in their numbers in the 1980s and '90s, the availability of LPFM licenses has renewed interest in HS radio.

== John Drury High School Radio Awards ==
The John Drury Awards are a national competition for high school radio students. The Drury categories include Best Newscast, Best Station Promo, Best Sports Play-by-Play, and Best Public Service Announcement. The awards are held each fall annually. The awards luncheon and ceremony is hosted by North Central College in Naperville, Illinois, just outside Chicago. The awards began as a small enterprise, but have grown each year with entries from stations in Michigan, Connecticut, Illinois, Tennessee, Iowa, and more. They are named in memory of John Drury, a television news anchorman from Chicago, IL.

The individual record for most awards won was set in 2007 by Wade Fink. Fink won seven awards, and had more points individually than any other station had total.

Points are awarded for each nomination and win in 16 categories. These points, in combination with a short essay, determine the winner of "High School Radio Station of the Year." The previous Station of the Year award winners are:

- 2005: 88.1 WLTL La Grange, Illinois
- 2006: 88.1 WBFH Bloomfield Hills, Michigan
- 2007: 88.1 WBFH Bloomfield Hills, Michigan
- 2008: 88.1 TIE WBFH Bloomfield Hills, Michigan and 88.1 WLTL La Grange, Illinois
- 2009: 88.1 WLTL La Grange, Illinois
- 2010: 88.1 WLTL La Grange, Illinois
- 2011: 90.3 WWPT Westport, Connecticut
- 2012: 88.1 WLTL La Grange, Illinois
- 2013-2014: 88.1 WBFH Bloomfield Hills, Michigan
- 2015: TIE 88.1 WBFH Bloomfield Hills, Michigan and WLTL La Grange, Illinois
- 2017: 90.3 WWPT Westport, Connecticut
- 2018-2019: 90.3 WWPT Westport, Connecticut
- 2019-2020: 88.1 WLTL La Grange, Illinois
- 2020-2021: 88.7 KVIT Mesa, Arizona
- 2021-2022: 88.1 WLTL La Grange, Illinois
- 2022-2023: 88.7 KVIT Mesa, Arizona
- 2023-2024: 88.9 KMIH Mercer Island, Washington
- 2024-2025: 90.3 WWPT Westport, Connecticut

== List of radio stations ==
=== Canada ===
Call sign	Frequency	City of licence	Owner
CHLS-FM	100.5 MHz	Lillooet, British Columbia	Lillooet Secondary School
CISD-FM	107.7 MHz	Iroquois, Ontario	Seaway District High School (defunct)
CKVI-FM	91.9 MHz	Kingston, Ontario	Kingston Collegiate and Vocational Institute
CHOP-FM	102.7 MHz	Newmarket, Ontario	Pickering College
CFU758	90.7 MHz	Thornhill, Ontario	Hodan Nalayeh Secondary School
CIKO-FM	97.5 MHz	Carcross, Yukon	Carcross Community School

=== United States ===
"Defunct" refers only to the stations themselves and not necessarily the schools that operated them. The dates listed often refer to the year when the station's license was formally revoked by the FCC, though in most cases the station had ceased broadcasting years before that.

This list includes stations that were/are licensed by the FCC and other stations eligible for the John Drury National High School Radio Awards. No licensed HS stations are known to have existed in Alabama, New Mexico, North Dakota, Oklahoma, and South Dakota.

Call sign	Frequency	City of license	State	Owner	Notes
KDHS-LP	95.5 FM	Delta Junction	Alaska	Delta High School	
KEAA-LP	97.9 FM	Eagle	Alaska	Eagle Community School	Defunct (2024)
KAMP-LP	92.9 FM	St. Michael	Alaska	Anthony A. Andrews School	Defunct (2009)
KUYI	88.1 FM	Hopi Reservation	Arizona	Hopi Junior and Senior H.S.	
KRMH	89.7 FM	Red Mesa	Arizona	Red Mesa H.S.	
KGHR	91.5 FM	Tuba City	Arizona	Greyhills Academy	
KWXL-LP	98.7 FM	Tucson	Arizona	Pueblo Magnet H.S.	
KVIT	88.7 FM	Chandler/Mesa	Arizona	East Valley Institute of Technology	
KCAC	89.5 FM	Camden	Arkansas	Camden Career Center	
KVMN	89.9 FM	Cave City	Arkansas	Cave City H.S.	
KCEA	89.1 FM	Atherton	California	Menlo-Atherton H.S.	
KBSH	89.9 FM	Borrego Springs	California	Borrego Springs H.S.	Defunct (1986)
KBPK	90.1 FM	Buena Park	California	Buena Park H.S.	Station later operated by Fullerton College; defunct (2023)
KVHS	90.5 FM	Concord	California	Mt. Diablo Unified School District	
KECG	88.1 FM	El Cerrito	California	El Cerrito H.S.	
KGAR-LP	93.3 FM	Lemoore	California	Lemoore Union H.S.	
KZKA-LP	101.5 FM	Los Angeles	California	Los Angeles Academy of Arts and Enterprise	
KNBS	90.3 FM	Manteca	California	East Union H.S.	Defunct (1980)
KAKX	89.3 FM	Mendocino	California	Mendocino H.S.	
KSFH	87.9 FM	Mountain View	California	St. Francis H.S.	Sold in 2015
KSPB	91.9 FM	Pebble Beach	California	Stevenson School	
KPSH	88.3 FM	Palm Springs	California	Palm Springs H.S.	Defunct (1986), sold to the University of Southern California
KRBH-LP	107.7 FM	Red Bluff	California	Red Bluff H.S.	
KRVH	91.5 FM	Rio Vista	California	Rio Vista H.S.	
KXHV	89.7 FM	Sacramento	California	Sacramento H.S.	Defunct (2003)
KYDS	91.5 FM	Sacramento	California	El Camino Fundamental H.S.	
KMTG	88.3 FM	San Jose	California	Pioneer H.S.	
KSRH	88.1 FM	San Rafael	California	San Rafael H.S.	Defunct (2024)
KTUO	99.1 FM	Sonora	California	Tuolomne H.S.	Defunct (2005)
KNHS	89.7 FM	Torrance	California	North H.S.	Defunct (1991)
KVIK	91.5 FM	Travis AFB	California	Vanden H.S.	Defunct (1990)
KBDG	90.9 FM	Turlock	California	Turlock Union H.S.	Station sold (1993) – now an ethnic broadcaster
KVCB-LP	100.9 FM	Vacaville	California	Vacaville Christian H.S.	FM plus HD1; HD2; HD3; HD4
KCDC	90.7 FM	Longmont	Colorado	St. Vrain Valley Career Development Center	Station sold in 2002, now a public radio station
KURA-LP	98.9 FM	Ouray	Colorado	Ouray H.S.	
WERB	94.5 FM	Berlin	Connecticut	Berlin H.S.	
WQTQ	89.9 FM	Hartford	Connecticut	Weaver H.S.	
WSLX	91.9 FM	New Canaan	Connecticut	St. Luke's School	
WBVC	91.1 FM	Pomfret	Connecticut	Pomfret School	Defunct (2022) & livestream shut down (2026)
WDJW	89.7 FM	Somers	Connecticut	Somers H.S.	
WWPT	90.3 FM	Westport	Connecticut	Staples High School	
WWEB	89.9 FM	Wallingford	Connecticut	Choate Rosemary Hall Foundation	Defunct (2022)
WMHS	88.1 FM	Pike Creek	Delaware	Thomas McKean H.S.	
WMPH	91.7 FM	Wilmington	Delaware	Mount Pleasant H.S.	
WUCR-LP	107.9 FM	Lake Butler	Florida	Union County H.S.	
WTHS	91.7 FM	Miami	Florida	Miami Technical H.S.	Defunct (1970) Now WLRN-FM
WGAG-FM	89.3 FM	Orlando	Florida	Oak Ridge H.S.	Defunct (1981)
WTHA-LP	107.1 FM	Seaside	Florida	Seaside Charter School	Defunct (2015)
WKPX	88.5 FM	Sunrise	Florida	Piper H.S.	Moved out of Piper H.S. In 2020
WPFL	88.9 FM	Winter Park	Florida	Winter Park H.S.	Defunct (1982)
WBHS-LP	106.7 FM	Brunswick	Georgia	Brunswick H.S.	
WCHS-LP	102.7 FM	Sylvester	Georgia	Worth County H.S.	
WXFC-LP	92.7 FM	Blue Ridge	Georgia	Fannin County H.S.	
KVOK-FM	88.1 FM	Honolulu	Hawaii	Kamehameha H.S.	Defunct (1965)
KLHS	88.9 FM	Lewiston	Idaho	Lewiston H.S.	Station transferred to Lewis–Clark State College in 2003. In 2007 call sign changed to KLCZ.
WBPR	88.5 FM	Barrington	Illinois	Barrington High School	Defunct (1982)
WRTE	89.5 FM	Cahokia	Illinois	Cahokia H.S.	Defunct (1989), unrelated to the current Chicago station with this callsign
WBHI	90.7 FM	Chicago	Illinois	Bogan H.S.	Defunct (2006)
WDGC	88.3 FM	Downers Grove	Illinois	North and South High Schools	
WEPS	88.9 FM	Elgin	Illinois	School District U-46, Elgin High School	
WHFH	88.5 FM	Flossmoor	Illinois	Homewood-Flossmoor High School	
WGHS	88.5 FM	Glen Ellyn	Illinois	Glenbard West High School	Streaming 24/7 since 2022
WGBK	88.5 FM	Glenview	Illinois	Glenbrook South High School	
WHSD	88.5 FM	Hinsdale	Illinois	Central and South High Schools	
WLTL	88.1 FM	La Grange	Illinois	Lyons Township High School	The nation's most awarded high school radio station
WAES	88.1 FM	Lincolnshire	Illinois	Stevenson High School	Defunct (2020)
WRHS	88.1 FM	Park Forest	Illinois	Rich Township H.S.	Defunct (1982)
WMTH	90.5 FM	Park Ridge	Illinois	Maine Township HS Dist 207- Maine East, Maine South and Maine West High Schools	
WQNA	88.3 FM	Springfield	Illinois	Capital Area Career Center	Sold to Covenant Network in 2020 and adopted a Catholic format with the call sign WTTT
WNTH	88.1 FM	Winnetka	Illinois	New Trier High School	
WHJE	91.3 FM	Carmel	Indiana	Carmel H.S.	
WDSO	88.3 FM	Chesterton	Indiana	Chesterton H.S.	
WJHS	91.5 FM	Columbia City	Indiana	Columbia City H.S.	
WPSR	90.7 FM	Evansville	Indiana	Southern Indiana Career & Technical Center	Licensed to Evansville-Vanderburgh School Corp.
WGVE-FM	88.7 FM	Gary	Indiana	Gary Community School Corporation	
WDHS	90.9 FM	Gaston	Indiana	Wes-Del H.S.	Defunct (1991)
WRGF	89.7 FM	Greenfield	Indiana	Greenfield-Central H.S.	
WVSH	91.9 FM	Huntington	Indiana	Huntington North H.S.	
WJEL	89.3 FM	Indianapolis	Indiana	J. Everett Light Career Center	
WBDG	90.9 FM	Indianapolis	Indiana	Ben Davis H.S.	FM plus HD1; HD2
WEDM	91.1 FM	Indianapolis	Indiana	Walker Career Center at Warren Central H.S.	
WRFT	91.5 FM	Indianapolis	Indiana	Franklin Central H.S.	
WKPW	90.7 FM	Knightstown	Indiana	New Castle Career Center	
WHSK	89.1 FM	Kokomo	Indiana	Haworth High School	Defunct (1996)
WJEF	91.9 FM	Lafayette	Indiana	Jefferson H.S.	
WCYT	91.1 FM	Lafayette Township	Indiana	Homestead H.S.	
WWDS	90.5 FM	Muncie	Indiana	Delta H.S.	Defunct (2010)
WWHI	91.3 FM	Muncie	Indiana	West H.S.	Station sold to Ball State University (2004)
WNAS	88.1 FM	New Albany	Indiana	New Albany H.S.	
WEEM	91.7 FM	Pendleton	Indiana	Pendleton Heights H.S.	
WETL	91.7 FM	South Bend	Indiana	James Whitcomb Riley H.S.	
WJPR	91.7 FM	Jasper	Indiana	Jasper H.S.	
KDPS	88.1 FM	Des Moines	Iowa	Des Moines Public Schools	
KWDM	88.7 FM	West Des Moines	Iowa	Valley High School	
KWHS	AM	Davenport	Iowa	Davenport West High School	Defunct
KBFZ-LP	101.7 FM	Garden City	Kansas	Garden City H.S.	
WRHR-LP	95.3 FM	Corbin	Kentucky	Corbin H.S.	
WFHS-LP	92.7 FM	Fern Creek	Kentucky	Fern Creek Traditional H.S.	Defunct (2023)
WYJR-LP	95.5 FM	Middlesboro	Kentucky	Middlesboro H.S.	
KBRH	1260 AM	Baton Rouge	Louisiana	Baton Rouge Magnet H.S.	Launched in 1979 as WTKL; assigned KBRH in 1993
WBRH	90.3 FM	Baton Rouge	Louisiana	Baton Rouge Magnet H.S.	Launched in 1978; broadcasts 24 hours per day, year-round
KNHS-LP	93.1 FM	Lafayette	Louisiana	Northside H.S.	
KBNF-LP	101.3	Ruston	Louisiana	Ruston H.S.	Student Run 80s radio station in Ruston, La
WMOS	95.3 FM	Bath	Maine	Morse H.S.	Defunct (1992)
WSHD	91.7 FM	Eastport	Maine	Shead Memorial H.S.	
WKHS	90.5 FM	Worton	Maryland	Kent County H.S.	
WHAB	89.1 FM	Acton	Massachusetts	Acton-Boxborough H.S.	
WPAA	91.7 FM	Andover	Massachusetts	Phillips Academy	Defunct (2002), later webcast only, defunct (2019), under restoration (2022)
WBMT	88.3 FM	Boxford	Massachusetts	Masconomet Regional H.S.	
WBPV	90.7 FM	Charlton	Massachusetts	Bay Path Vocational H.S.	Station sold to a religious broadcaster (2003)
WIQH	88.3 FM	Concord	Massachusetts	Concord-Carlisle H.S.	
WNNZ-FM	91.7 FM	Deerfield	Massachusetts	Deerfield Academy	Simulcast of WFCR
WCCT-FM	90.3 FM	Harwich Port	Massachusetts	Cape Cod Regional Technical H.S.	Defunct (2024)
WDBY	91.7 FM	Duxbury	Massachusetts	Duxbury H.S.	Defunct (1988)
WHHB	99.9 FM	Holliston	Massachusetts	Holliston H.S.	
WAVM	91.7 FM	Maynard	Massachusetts	Maynard H.S.	
WWTA	88.5 FM	Marion	Massachusetts	Tabor Academy	Defunct (2014)
WNMH	91.5 FM	Northfield	Massachusetts	Northfield Mount Hermon School	
WRPS	88.3 FM	Rockland	Massachusetts	Rockland H.S.	
WSDH	91.5 FM	Sandwich	Massachusetts	Sandwich H.S.	
WBSL-FM	91.7 FM	Sheffield	Massachusetts	The Berkshire School	
WTBR-FM	89.7 FM	Pittsfield	Massachusetts	Taconic H.S.	
WYAJ	97.7 FM	Sudbury	Massachusetts	Lincoln-Sudbury H.S.	Defunct (2022)
WSRB	91.5 FM	Walpole	Massachusetts	Walpole H.S.	Defunct (2001)
WHSR	91.9 FM	Winchester	Massachusetts	Winchester H.S.	Defunct
WAHS	89.5 FM	Auburn Hills	Michigan	Avondale H.S.	
WCHW	91.3 FM	Bay City	Michigan	Bay City Public Schools	
WTSD	88.1 FM	Drayton Plains	Michigan	Waterford H.S.	Defunct
WBFH	88.1 FM	Bloomfield Hills	Michigan	Andover H.S.	
WKDS	89.9 FM	Kalamazoo	Michigan	Norrix H.S.	Sold to WMU & switched to classical (2019)
WRWW-LP	92.3 FM	Lowell	Michigan	Lowell Area Schools	
WERW	94.3 FM	Monroe	Michigan	Monroe H.S.	Station sold by a community college (2014)
WRFK-LP	107.7 FM	Mt. Pleasant	Michigan	Mt. Pleasant Baptist Academy	Defunct
WNBI-LP	107.9 FM	New Buffalo	Michigan	New Buffalo H.S.	
WOVI	89.5 FM	Novi	Michigan	Novi H.S.	
WOPR	90.3 FM	Oak Park	Michigan	Oak Park H.S.	Defunct (2001)
WOAS	88.5 FM	Ontonagon	Michigan	Ontonagon Area H.S.	
WBLD	89.3 FM	Orchard Lake	Michigan	West Bloomfield H.S.	moved to Sheiko Elementary School in 2014
WOES	91.3 FM	Ovid-Elsie	Michigan	Ovid-Elsie H.S.	
WSDP	88.1 FM	Plymouth	Michigan	Plymouth-Canton H.S.	
WORW	91.9 FM	Port Huron	Michigan	Northern H.S.	First began broadcasting in 1972, and is still in operation.
WOAK	89.3 FM	Royal Oak	Michigan	Royal Oak H.S.	Defunct
WSHJ	88.3 FM	Southfield	Michigan	Southfield H.S.	
WMLZ-LP	107.9 FM	Temperance	Michigan	Bedford H.S.	
WPHS	89.1 FM	Warren	Michigan	Cousino H.S.	
KBEM-FM	88.5 FM	Minneapolis	Minnesota	North H.S.	High school students are on the air every school day plus every weekday during the Summer from 9:00 AM until 3:00 PM
KDXL	106.5 FM	St. Louis Park	Minnesota	St. Louis Park H.S.	Defunct (2018)
WALP	90.5 FM	Corinth	Mississippi	Kossuth H.S.	Defunct (1989)
WPWS-LP	104.3 FM	Piney Woods	Mississippi	The Piney Woods School	
KRHS	90.1 FM	Overland	Missouri	Ritenour H.S.	
KHTC	89.5 FM	Helena	Montana	Helena Vo-Tech	Defunct (1990)
KPLR-LP	96.9 FM	Poplar	Montana	Poplar H.S.	Defunct (2021)
KTGC-LP	101.3 FM	St. Regis	Montana	St. Regis H.S.	
KDGZ-LP	98.3 FM	Townsend	Montana	Broadwater H.S.	
KGLH	91.5 FM	Gerlach	Nevada	Gerlach H.S.	Defunct (1994)
WCNH	90.5 FM	Concord	New Hampshire	St. Paul's School	Sold to New Hampshire Public Radio (2021)
WPEA	90.5 FM	Exeter	New Hampshire	Phillips Exeter Academy	
WLLO-LP	102.9 FM	Londonderry	New Hampshire	Londonderry High School	
WAJM	88.9 FM	Atlantic City	New Jersey	Atlantic City High School	
WBEK	88.1 FM	Cherry Hill	New Jersey	Cherry Hill School District - Beck Middle School	Defunct (1989)
WCVH	90.5 FM	Flemington	New Jersey	Hunterdon Central High School	
WHPH	90.5 FM	Whippany	New Jersey	Hanover Park High School; Whippany Park High School	Defunct (1986)
WJSV	90.5 FM	Morristown	New Jersey	Morristown High School	
WLCR	89.7 FM	Lawrence Twp.	New Jersey	Lawrence High School	Defunct
WMRH-LP	101.7 FM	Linwood	New Jersey	Mainland Regional High School	
WOGH	88.9 FM	West Orange	New Jersey	West Orange High School	Defunct (1981)
WRRH	88.7 FM	Franklin Lakes	New Jersey	Ramapo High School	Defunct
WVHP	90.3 FM	Highland Park	New Jersey	Highland Park High School	Defunct
WVPH	90.3 FM	Piscataway	New Jersey	Piscataway Township High School	Station is now shared between the high school and Rutgers University
WWPH	107.9 FM	Princeton Junction	New Jersey	West Windsor-Plainsboro High School	
WBXL	90.5 FM	Baldwinsville	New York	Charles W. Baker H.S.	
WXBA	88.1 FM	Brentwood	New York	Brentwood H.S.	
WBKT	93.3 FM	Brockport	New York	D.W. Field H.S.	Defunct (1991)
WCSQ	89.3 FM	Central Square	New York	Central Square H.S.	Defunct (1991)
WHHJ	88.9 FM	Dix Hills	New York	Half Hills Hollow East H.S.	Defunct (1981)
WELV-LP	107.9 FM	Ellenville	New York	Ellenville H.S.	
WGMC	90.1 FM	Greece	New York	Olympia H.S.	
WSHR	91.9 FM	Lake Ronkonkoma	New York	Sachem North H.S.	
WBER	90.5 FM	Fairport	New York	Monroe #1 BOCES	
WOSS	91.5 FM	Ossining	New York	Ossining H.S.	Sold to Union School District #1 in 1998
WPOB	88.5 FM	Plainview	New York	Plainview-Old Bethpage John F. Kennedy H.S.	Shares time with WKWZ, Syosset
WIRQ	90.9 FM	Rochester	New York	Irondequoit H.S.	
WSCS	89.5 FM	Sodus	New York	Sodus H.S.	Defunct (1990)
WKWZ	88.5 FM	Syosset	New York	Syosset H.S.	Shares time with WPOB, Plainview
WUAW	88.3 FM	Erwin	North Carolina	Triton H.S.	
WSEQ-LP	92.9 FM	Hudson	North Carolina	South Caldwell H.S.	Defunct (2024)
WSER-LP	100.1 FM	Lenoir	North Carolina	South Caldwell H.S.	Defunct (2024)
WRSH	91.1 FM	Rockingham	North Carolina	Rockingham H.S.	
WHYC	88.5 FM	Swan Quarter	North Carolina	Matamuskeet H.S.	Defunct (2025)
WZCO	89.9 FM	Chadbourn, North Carolina	North Carolina	Columbus Career and College Academy	Sold to WUNC (2023).
WAPS	91.3 FM	Akron	Ohio	Akron Public Schools	
WKHR	91.5 FM	Bainbridge	Ohio	Kenston High School	
WCNE	88.7 FM	Batavia	Ohio	Clermont Northeastern High School	Defunct (1989); had been shared-time with WOBO, now operating 24 hours on 88.7
WBHR	88.7 FM	Bellaire	Ohio	Bellaire H.S.	Defunct (1989)
WCWT-FM	107.3 FM	Centerville	Ohio	Centerville H.S.	
WNSD	90.1 FM	Cincinnati	Ohio	Colerain High School	Defunct (1978)
WDPS-FM	89.5 FM	Dayton	Ohio	Dayton Public Schools	
WUDR	98.1 FM	Dayton	Ohio	Northridge H.S.	Station now operated by the University of Dayton
WDEQ	91.7 FM	De Graff	Ohio	Riverside H.S.	
WHSS	89.5 FM	Hamilton	Ohio	Hamilton H.S.	Sold to Sacred Heart Radio Inc. in 2010
WKET	98.3 FM	Kettering	Ohio	Kettering H.S.	
WDIF-LP	97.5 FM	Marion	Ohio	Harding H.S.	
WLMH	89.1 FM	Morrow	Ohio	Little Miami High School	Defunct (2012)
WNHS-LP	105.7 FM	Newcomerstown	Ohio	Newcomerstown H.S.	Defunct (2023)
WRCJ	89.3 FM	Reading	Ohio	Reading High School	Defunct (1989), now WMKV.
WSTB	88.9 FM	Streetsboro	Ohio	Streetsboro H.S.	
WKTL	90.7 FM	Struthers	Ohio	Struthers H.S.	
WXTS	88.3 FM	Toledo	Ohio	Scott H.S.	
WUHS	91.7 FM	Urbana	Ohio	Urbana H.S.	Defunct (1989)
WLHS	89.9 FM	West Chester	Ohio	Lakota H.S.	Still Licensed, simulcast of WMKV
WUHS-LP	96.9 FM	West Union	Ohio	West Union H.S.	
KMHS	1420 AM	Coos Bay	Oregon	Marshfield H.S.	
KEPO	92.9 FM	Eagle Point	Oregon	Eagle Point	Defunct (1999)
KRVM-FM	91.9 FM	Eugene	Oregon	Eugene School District 4J.	
KFSL-LP	99.5 FM	Fossil	Oregon	Wheeler H.S.	
KPAI-LP	103.1 FM	Paisley	Oregon	Paisley H.S.	
KBPS-AM	1450 AM	Portland	Oregon	Benson Polytechnic High School	
KZSO-LP	106.5 FM	Sisters	Oregon	Sisters H.S.	Defunct March 22, 2016
KBPS	1450 AM	Portland	Oregon	Benson H.S.	
WASD	88.1 FM	Exeter	Pennsylvania	Wyoming Area H.S.	Defunct
WRSD	97.3 FM	Folsom	Pennsylvania	Ridley H.S.	
WZZE	94.9 FM	Glen Mills	Pennsylvania	Glen Mills School	Defunct July 2, 2019
WHHS	99.9 FM	Havertown	Pennsylvania	Haverford Twp. H.S.	
WMSS	91.1 FM	Middletown	Pennsylvania	Middletown Area Middle School	
WCSD	89.3 FM	Warminster	Pennsylvania	William Tennent H.S.	Defunct 1986; license transferred to Bux-Mont Educational Radio Association, which changed the call letters to WRDV
WCVY	91.5 FM	Coventry	Rhode Island	Coventry H.S.	
WJHD	90.7 FM	Portsmouth	Rhode Island	Portsmouth Abbey School	License transferred to Rhode Island Public Radio in November 2021; call sign changed to WNPK
WELH	88.1 FM	Providence	Rhode Island	The Wheeler School	
WCEW	90.9 FM	Charleston	South Carolina	C.E. Williams Middle School	Defunct (1988)
WCSK	90.3 FM	Kingsport	Tennessee	Dobyns-Bennett H.S.	
WKCS	91.1 FM	Knoxville	Tennessee	Fulton H.S.	
WQOX	88.5 FM	Memphis	Tennessee	Craigmont H.S.	
WIKU	91.3 FM	Pikeville	Tennessee	Bledsoe County H.S.	Defunct (1988)
WQTR-LP	106.1 FM	Savannah	Tennessee	Hardin County H.S.	
WMTN-LP	93.1 FM	Sewanee	Tennessee	St. Andrews-Sewanee School	
KRSM	93.3 FM	Dallas	Texas	St. Mark's School of Texas	Defunct (1997)
KQAT-LP	104.9 FM	Hallsville	Texas	Hallsville H.S.	
KEOM	88.5 FM	Mesquite	Texas	Mesquite Independent School District.	
KPHS	90.3 FM	Plains	Texas	Plains H.S.	Defunct (2021)
KOHS	91.7 FM	Orem	Utah	Orem H.S.	
KPWN	90.9 FM	Parowan	Utah	Parowan H.S.	Defunct
KPGR	88.1 FM	Pleasant Grove	Utah	Pleasant Grove H.S.	
KUHS	90.9 FM	Roosevelt	Utah	Union H.S.	Defunct (1980)
WYTC-LP	89.1 FM	Hyde Park	Vermont	Lamoille Union H.S.	
WFOS	88.7 FM	Chesapeake	Virginia	Chesapeake Public Schools	
WHCE	91.1 FM	Highland Springs	Virginia	Highland Springs H.S.	
WVLS	89.7 FM	Monterey	Virginia	Highland H.S.	
WNHS	88.7 FM	Portsmouth	Virginia	I. C. Norcom HS	Shuttered c. 1983, license transferred to WFOS to relocate
WYCS	91.5 FM	Yorktown	Virginia	York County H.S.	Station sold to religious broadcaster (1997)
KAHS-LP	106.5 FM	Aberdeen	Washington	Aberdeen H.S.	
KASB	89.9 FM	Bellevue	Washington	Bellevue H.S.	
KGHP	89.9 FM	Gig Harbor	Washington	Peninsula High School	Translators: K207AZ (89.3 FM), K229BL (93.7 FM)
KTCV	88.1 FM	Kennewick	Washington	Tri-Cities Vocational Skills Center	
KMIH	88.9 FM	Mercer Island	Washington	Mercer Island H.S.	
KUBS	91.5 FM	Newport	Washington	Newport H.S.	
KNHC	89.5 FM	Seattle	Washington	Nathan Hale H.S.	C-89.5
KFIO	1110 AM	Spokane	Washington	North Central H.S., 1923-1929	Sold to the Spokane Broadcasting Corporation in 1929. Now commercial news-talk station KSBN
KVTI	90.9 FM	Tacoma	Washington	Clover Park Technical College	Now leased to Northwest Public Radio (2010)
KYVT	88.5 FM	Yakima	Washington	Yakima Valley Tech Skills Center	Now leased to Northwest Public Radio (2012). Still owned by Yakima School District. No longer programmed by HS students.
WFGH	90.7 FM	Fort Gay	West Virginia	Tolsia H.S.	Formerly located at Fort Gay H.S. through 1992
WRSG	91.5 FM	Middlebourne	West Virginia	Tyler Consolidated H.S.	
WSPW-LP	97.9 FM	Parkersburg	West Virginia	South H.S.	Defunct (2019)
WYRC-LP	92.3 FM	Spencer	West Virginia	Roane County H.S.	
WPHP	91.9 FM	Wheeling	West Virginia	Wheeling Park H.S.	
WBSD	89.1 FM	Burlington	Wisconsin	Burlington H.S.	
WGBP	90.1 FM	Green Bay	Wisconsin	Premontre H.S.	Defunct (1982)
WLXS-LP	101.5 FM	La Crosse	Wisconsin	School District of La Crosse	
WYMS	88.9 FM	Milwaukee	Wisconsin	Milwaukee Public Schools	Outside of compulsory airing of school board meetings, station is leased to non-profit group "Radio Milwaukee"
WESD	94.7 FM	Schofield	Wisconsin	D.C. Everest H.S.	Defunct (1988)
WSHS	91.7 FM	Sheboygan	Wisconsin	Sheboygan North & South High School (Sheboygan Area School District)	Station carries Wisconsin Public Radio's Ideas Network outside of school hours
KYDZ	90.1 FM	Cody	Wyoming	Cody H.S.	Defunct (1998)
KJHB-LP	97.7 FM	Jackson	Wyoming	Jackson Hole H.S.	
