= List of FM radio stations in the United States by call sign (initial letters WA–WC) =

List of FM radio stations in the US (WA–WC)

This is a list of FM radio stations in the United States having call signs beginning with the letters WA through WC. Low-power FM radio stations, those with designations such as WAAK-LP, have not been included in this list.

== WA-- ==
Callsign	Frequency	City of license
WAAC	92.9 FM	Valdosta, Georgia
WAAE	91.9 FM	New Bern, North Carolina
WAAG	94.9 FM	Galesburg, Illinois
WAAI	100.9 FM	Hurlock, Maryland
WAAJ	90.5 FM	Benton, Kentucky
WAAL	99.1 FM	Binghamton, New York
WAAO-FM	93.7 FM	Andalusia, Alabama
WAAW	94.7 FM	Williston, South Carolina
WAAZ-FM	104.7 FM	Crestview, Florida
WABD	97.5 FM	Mobile, Alabama
WABE	90.1 FM	Atlanta
WABK-FM	104.3 FM	Gardiner, Maine
WABO-FM	105.5 FM	Waynesboro, Mississippi
WABR	91.1 FM	Tifton, Georgia
WABX	107.5 FM	Evansville, Indiana
WACD	106.1 FM	Antigo, Wisconsin
WACG-FM	90.7 FM	Augusta, Georgia
WACL	98.5 FM	Elkton, Virginia
WACO-FM	99.9 FM	Waco, Texas
WACR-FM	105.3 FM	Columbus Air Force Base
WACV	93.1 FM	Coosada, Alabama
WADI	95.3 FM	Corinth, Mississippi
WAEB-FM	104.1 FM	Allentown, Pennsylvania
WAED	88.5 FM	Sheridan, Illinois
WAEF	90.3 FM	Cordele, Georgia
WAEG	92.3 FM	Evans, Georgia
WAEL-FM	96.1 FM	Maricao, Puerto Rico
WAER	88.3 FM	Syracuse, New York
WAEV	97.3 FM	Savannah, Georgia
WAEZ	94.9 FM	Greeneville, Tennessee
WAFD	100.3 FM	Webster Springs, West Virginia
WAFJ	88.3 FM	Belvedere, South Carolina
WAFL	97.7 FM	Milford, Delaware
WAFM	95.7 FM	Amory, Mississippi
WAFN-FM	92.7 FM	Arab, Alabama
WAFR	88.3 FM	Tupelo, Mississippi
WAFT	101.1 FM	Valdosta, Georgia
WAFX	106.9 FM	Suffolk, Virginia
WAFY	103.1 FM	Middletown, Maryland
WAFZ-FM	92.1 FM	Immokalee, Florida
WAGF-FM	101.3 FM	Dothan, Alabama
WAGH	101.3 FM	Smiths, Alabama
WAGO	88.7 FM	Snow Hill, North Carolina
WAGP	88.7 FM	Beaufort, South Carolina
WAGR-FM	102.5 FM	Lexington, Mississippi
WAGX	101.3 FM	Manchester, Ohio
WAHP	88.5 FM	Belton, South Carolina
WAHR	99.1 FM	Huntsville, Alabama
WAHS	89.5 FM	Auburn Hills, Michigan
WAIC	91.9 FM	Springfield, Massachusetts
WAID	106.5 FM	Clarksdale, Mississippi
WAIF	88.3 FM	Cincinnati
WAIH	96.5 FM	Holly Springs, Mississippi
WAII	89.3 FM	Hattiesburg, Mississippi
WAIJ	90.3 FM	Grantsville, Maryland
WAIL	99.5 FM	Key West, Florida
WAIN-FM	93.5 FM	Columbia, Kentucky
WAIO	95.1 FM	Honeoye Falls, New York
WAIR	104.9 FM	Lake City, Michigan
WAIV	91.7 FM	Kingston, New York
WAIW	92.5 FM	Winchester, Virginia
WAJC	88.1 FM	Newport, Minnesota
WAJH	91.1 FM	Birmingham, Alabama
WAJI	95.1 FM	Fort Wayne, Indiana
WAJJ	89.3 FM	McKenzie, Tennessee
WAJK	99.3 FM	La Salle, Illinois
WAJM	88.9 FM	Atlantic City, New Jersey
WAJP	107.7 FM	Perry, Florida
WAJQ-FM	104.3 FM	Alma, Georgia
WAJS	91.7 FM	Tupelo, Mississippi
WAJV	98.9 FM	Brooksville, Mississippi
WAJZ	96.3 FM	Voorheesville, New York
WAKB	100.9 FM	Hephzibah, Georgia
WAKC	102.3 FM	Concord, New Hampshire
WAKD	89.9 FM	Sheffield, Alabama
WAKG	103.3 FM	Danville, Virginia
WAKH	105.7 FM	McComb, Mississippi
WAKJ	91.3 FM	DeFuniak Springs, Florida
WAKL	106.7 FM	Gainesville, Georgia
WAKO-FM	103.1 FM	Lawrenceville, Illinois
WAKP	89.1 FM	Smithboro, Georgia
WAKS	96.5 FM	Akron, Ohio
WAKU	94.1 FM	Crawfordville, Florida
WAKW	93.3 FM	Cincinnati
WAKX	98.7 FM	Palm Coast, Florida
WAKY-FM	103.5 FM	Radcliff, Kentucky
WAKZ	95.9 FM	Sharpsville, Pennsylvania
WALC	100.5 FM	Charleston, South Carolina
WALF	89.7 FM	Alfred, New York
WALJ	105.1 FM	Northport, Alabama
WALK-FM	97.5 FM	Patchogue, New York
WALN	89.3 FM	Carrollton, Alabama
WALR-FM	104.1 FM	Palmetto, Georgia
WALS	102.1 FM	Oglesby, Illinois
WALT-FM	102.1 FM	Meridian, Mississippi
WALV-FM	95.3 FM	Ooltewah, Tennessee
WALX	100.9 FM	Orrville, Alabama
WALY	100.1 FM	Altoona, Pennsylvania
WALZ-FM	95.3 FM	Machias, Maine
WAMC-FM	90.3 FM	Albany, New York
WAMH	89.3 FM	Amherst, Massachusetts
WAMI-FM	102.3 FM	Opp, Alabama
WAMJ	107.5 FM	Roswell, Georgia
WAMK	90.9 FM	Kingston, New York
WAMP	88.1 FM	Jackson, Tennessee
WAMQ	105.1 FM	Great Barrington, Massachusetts
WAMR-FM	107.5 FM	Miami, Florida
WAMU	88.5 FM	Washington, D.C.
WAMW-FM	107.9 FM	Washington, Indiana
WAMX	106.3 FM	Milton, West Virginia
WAMZ	97.5 FM	Louisville, Kentucky
WANC	103.9 FM	Ticonderoga, New York
WANH	88.3 FM	Meredith, New Hampshire
WANM	90.5 FM	Tallahassee, Florida
WANR	88.5 FM	Brewster, New York
WANT	98.9 FM	Lebanon, Tennessee
WANV	96.7 FM	Annville, Kentucky
WANY-FM	100.9 FM	Albany, Kentucky
WANZ	90.1 FM	Stamford, New York
WAOA-FM	107.1 FM	Melbourne, Florida
WAOB-FM	106.7 FM	Beaver Falls, Pennsylvania
WAOL	99.5 FM	Ripley, Ohio
WAOM	90.5 FM	Mowrystown, Ohio
WAOR	102.7 FM	Ligonier, Indiana
WAOX	105.3 FM	Staunton, Illinois
WAOY	91.7 FM	Gulfport, Mississippi
WAPB	91.7 FM	Madison, Florida
WAPD	91.7 FM	Campbellsville, Kentucky
WAPE-FM	95.1 FM	Jacksonville, Florida
WAPJ	89.9 FM	Torrington, Connecticut
WAPL	105.7 FM	Appleton, Wisconsin
WAPN	91.5 FM	Holly Hill, Florida
WAPO	90.5 FM	Mount Vernon, Illinois
WAPR	88.3 FM	Selma, Alabama
WAPS	91.3 FM	Akron, Ohio
WAPX-FM	91.9 FM	Clarksville, Tennessee
WAQB	90.9 FM	Tupelo, Mississippi
WAQE-FM	97.7 FM	Barron, Wisconsin
WAQL	90.5 FM	McComb, Mississippi
WAQU	91.1 FM	Selma, Alabama
WAQV	90.9 FM	Crystal River, Florida
WAQX-FM	95.7 FM	Manlius, New York
WAQY	102.1 FM	Springfield, Massachusetts
WARA-FM	88.3 FM	New Washington, Indiana
WARC	90.3 FM	Meadville, Pennsylvania
WARD	91.9 FM	New Paris, Ohio
WARG	88.9 FM	Summit, Illinois
WARH	106.5 FM	Granite City, Illinois
WARJ	102.5 FM	Shawsville, Virginia
WARM-FM	103.3 FM	York, Pennsylvania
WARN	91.3 FM	Culpeper, Virginia
WARO	94.5 FM	Naples, Florida
WARQ	93.5 FM	Columbia, South Carolina
WARU-FM	101.9 FM	Roann, Indiana
WARV-FM	90.1 FM	Colonial Heights, Virginia
WARW	96.7 FM	Port Chester, New York
WARX	93.9 FM	Lewiston, Maine
WARY	88.1 FM	Valhalla, New York
WASH	97.1 FM	Washington, D.C.
WASJ	105.1 FM	Panama City Beach, Florida
WASK-FM	98.7 FM	Battle Ground, Indiana
WASL	100.1 FM	Dyersburg, Tennessee
WASM	91.1 FM	Natchez, Mississippi
WASU-FM	90.5 FM	Boone, North Carolina
WASW	91.9 FM	Waycross, Georgia
WATD-FM	95.9 FM	Marshfield, Massachusetts
WATI	89.9 FM	Vincennes, Indiana
WATO	106.1 FM	Oliver Springs, Tennessee
WATP	90.7 FM	Laurel, Mississippi
WATQ	106.7 FM	Chetek, Wisconsin
WATU	89.3 FM	Port Gibson, Mississippi
WATY	91.3 FM	Folkston, Georgia
WATZ-FM	99.3 FM	Alpena, Michigan
WAUE	100.3 FM	Waverly, Alabama
WAUH	102.3 FM	Wautoma, Wisconsin
WAUI	88.3 FM	Shelby, Ohio
WAUM	91.9 FM	Duck Hill, Mississippi
WAUO	90.7 FM	Hohenwald, Tennessee
WAUS	90.7 FM	Berrien Springs, Michigan
WAUV	89.7 FM	Ripley, Tennessee
WAUZ	89.1 FM	Greensburg, Indiana
WAVA-FM	105.1 FM	Arlington, Virginia
WAVC	93.9 FM	Mio, Michigan
WAVD	97.1 FM	Ocean Pines, Maryland
WAVF	101.7 FM	Hanahan, South Carolina
WAVH	106.5 FM	Daphne, Alabama
WAVI	91.5 FM	Oxford, Mississippi
WAVK	97.7 FM	Marathon, Florida
WAVJ	103.3 FM	Waterbury, Vermont
WAVL	100.5 FM	Rothschild, Wisconsin
WAVM	91.7 FM	Maynard, Massachusetts
WAVR	102.1 FM	Waverly, New York
WAVT-FM	101.9 FM	Pottsville, Pennsylvania
WAVV	101.1 FM	Naples Park, Florida
WAVW	92.7 FM	Stuart, Florida
WAWC	103.5 FM	Syracuse, Indiana
WAWE	94.3 FM	Glendale Heights, Illinois
WAWF	88.3 FM	Kankakee, Illinois
WAWH	88.3 FM	Dublin, Georgia
WAWI	89.7 FM	Lawrenceburg, Tennessee
WAWJ	90.1 FM	Marion, Illinois
WAWM	98.9 FM	Petoskey, Michigan
WAWN	89.5 FM	Franklin, Pennsylvania
WAWR	93.5 FM	Remsen, New York
WAWS	107.3 FM	Claxton, Georgia
WAWX	101.7 FM	Lynchburg, Virginia
WAWY	103.9 FM	Dundee, Illinois
WAWZ	99.1 FM	Zarephath, New Jersey
WAXG	88.1 FM	Mount Sterling, Kentucky
WAXI	104.9 FM	Rockville, Indiana
WAXJ	103.5 FM	Frederiksted, Virgin Islands
WAXL	103.3 FM	Santa Claus, Indiana
WAXM	93.5 FM	Big Stone Gap, Virginia
WAXQ	104.3 FM	New York City
WAXR	88.1 FM	Geneseo, Illinois
WAXS	94.1 FM	Oak Hill, West Virginia
WAXU	91.1 FM	Troy, Alabama
WAXX	104.5 FM	Eau Claire, Wisconsin
WAYA-FM	100.9 FM	Ridgeville, South Carolina
WAYB-FM	95.7 FM	Graysville, Tennessee
WAYC	100.9 FM	Bedford, Pennsylvania
WAYD	88.1 FM	Auburn, Kentucky
WAYF	88.1 FM	West Palm Beach, Florida
WAYH	88.1 FM	Harvest, Alabama
WAYI	104.3 FM	Charlestown, Indiana
WAYJ	89.5 FM	Naples, Florida
WAYK	105.9 FM	Valley Station, Kentucky
WAYL	91.9 FM	St. Augustine, Florida
WAYM	88.7 FM	Spring Hill, Tennessee
WAYP	88.3 FM	Marianna, Florida
WAYQ	88.3 FM	Clarksville, Tennessee
WAYR-FM	90.7 FM	Brunswick, Georgia
WAYT	88.1 FM	Thomasville, Georgia
WAYU	91.1 FM	Steele, Alabama
WAYV	95.1 FM	Atlantic City, New Jersey
WAYW	89.9 FM	New Johnsonville, Tennessee
WAYZ	104.7 FM	Hagerstown, Maryland
WAZA	107.7 FM	Liberty, Mississippi
WAZD	88.1 FM	Savannah, Tennessee
WAZK	97.7 FM	Nantucket, Massachusetts
WAZO	107.5 FM	Southport, North Carolina
WAZR	93.7 FM	Woodstock, Virginia
WAZU	90.7 FM	Peoria, Illinois
WAZX-FM	101.9 FM	Cleveland, Georgia
WAZY-FM	96.5 FM	Lafayette, Indiana

== WB-- ==
Callsign	Frequency	City of license
WBAA-FM	101.3 FM	West Lafayette, Indiana
WBAB	102.3 FM	Babylon, New York
WBAD	94.3 FM	Leland, Mississippi
WBAI	99.5 FM	New York City
WBAK	104.7 FM	Belfast, Maine
WBAM-FM	98.9 FM	Montgomery, Alabama
WBAP-FM	93.3 FM	Haltom City, Texas
WBAR-FM	94.7 FM	Lake Luzerne, New York
WBAV-FM	101.9 FM	Gastonia, North Carolina
WBAZ	102.5 FM	Bridgehampton, New York
WBBA-FM	97.5 FM	Pittsfield, Illinois
WBBB	96.1 FM	Raleigh, North Carolina
WBBC-FM	93.5 FM	Blackstone, Virginia
WBBE	97.9 FM	Heyworth, Illinois
WBBG	106.1 FM	Niles, Ohio
WBBI	107.5 FM	Endwell, New York
WBBK-FM	93.1 FM	Blakely, Georgia
WBBL	96.5 FM	Richton, Mississippi
WBBM-FM	96.3 FM	Chicago
WBBN	95.9 FM	Taylorsville, Mississippi
WBBO	98.5 FM	Ocean Acres, New Jersey
WBBQ-FM	104.3 FM	Augusta, Georgia
WBBS	104.7 FM	Fulton, New York
WBBT-FM	107.3 FM	Powhatan, Virginia
WBBV	101.3 FM	Vicksburg, Mississippi
WBBX	106.5 FM	Pocomoke City, Maryland
WBCG	98.9 FM	Murdock, Florida
WBCH-FM	100.1 FM	Hastings, Michigan
WBCI	105.9 FM	Bath, Maine
WBCJ	88.1 FM	Spencerville, Ohio
WBCK	95.3 FM	Battle Creek, Michigan
WBCL	90.3 FM	Fort Wayne, Indiana
WBCM	93.5 FM	Boyne City, Michigan
WBCQ-FM	94.7 FM	Monticello, Maine
WBCR-FM	90.3 FM	Beloit, Wisconsin
WBCT	93.7 FM	Grand Rapids, Michigan
WBCV	107.9 FM	Wausau, Wisconsin
WBCW	89.7 FM	Upland, Indiana
WBCX	89.1 FM	Gainesville, Georgia
WBCY	89.5 FM	Archbold, Ohio
WBDC	100.9 FM	Huntingburg, Indiana
WBDG	90.9 FM	Indianapolis, Indiana
WBDK	96.7 FM	Algoma, Wisconsin
WBDR	106.7 FM	Copenhagen, New York
WBDX	102.7 FM	Trenton, Georgia
WBEA	101.7 FM	Southold, New York
WBEB	101.1 FM	Philadelphia
WBEC-FM	95.9 FM	Pittsfield, Massachusetts
WBED	90.1 FM	Bedford, Indiana
WBEE-FM	92.5 FM	Rochester, New York
WBEK	91.1 FM	Kankakee, Illinois
WBEL-FM	88.5 FM	Cairo, Illinois
WBEN-FM	95.7 FM	Philadelphia
WBEQ	90.7 FM	Morris, Illinois
WBER	90.5 FM	Rochester, New York
WBET-FM	99.3 FM	Sturgis, Michigan
WBEV-FM	95.3 FM	Beaver Dam, Wisconsin
WBEW	89.5 FM	Chesterton, Indiana
WBEY-FM	97.9 FM	Crisfield, Maryland
WBEZ	91.5 FM	Chicago
WBFA	98.3 FM	Fort Mitchell, Alabama
WBFB	97.1 FM	Bangor, Maine
WBFE	99.1 FM	Bar Harbor, Maine
WBFG	96.5 FM	Parkers Crossroads, Tennessee
WBFH	88.1 FM	Bloomfield Hills, Michigan
WBFI	91.5 FM	McDaniels, Kentucky
WBFJ-FM	89.3 FM	Winston-Salem, North Carolina
WBFK	91.1 FM	Hiseville, Kentucky
WBFM	93.7 FM	Sheboygan, Wisconsin
WBFO	88.7 FM	Buffalo, New York
WBFR	89.5 FM	Birmingham, Alabama
WBFW	94.5 FM	Smith Mills, Kentucky
WBFX	101.3 FM	Grand Rapids, Michigan
WBFZ	105.3 FM	Selma, Alabama
WBGB	103.3 FM	Boston, Massachusetts
WBGE	101.9 FM	Bainbridge, Georgia
WBGF	93.5 FM	Belle Glade, Florida
WBGG-FM	105.9 FM	Fort Lauderdale, Florida
WBGI-FM	105.5 FM	Bethlehem, West Virginia
WBGK	99.7 FM	Newport Village, New York
WBGL	91.7 FM	Champaign, Illinois
WBGM	88.1 FM	New Berlin, Pennsylvania
WBGN	99.1 FM	Beaver Dam, Kentucky
WBGO	88.3 FM	Newark, New Jersey
WBGP	91.3 FM	Moultrie, Georgia
WBGQ	100.7 FM	Bull's Gap, Tennessee
WBGR-FM	93.7 FM	Monroe, Wisconsin
WBGU	88.1 FM	Bowling Green, Ohio
WBGV	92.5 FM	Marlette, Michigan
WBGW-FM	101.5 FM	Fort Branch, Indiana
WBGY	88.1 FM	Naples, Florida
WBHB-FM	101.5 FM	Waynesboro, Pennsylvania
WBHC-FM	92.1 FM	Hampton, South Carolina
WBHD	95.7 FM	Olyphant, Pennsylvania
WBHJ	95.7 FM	Midfield, Alabama
WBHK	98.7 FM	Warrior, Alabama
WBHL	90.7 FM	Harrison, Michigan
WBHM	90.3 FM	Birmingham, Alabama
WBHQ	92.7 FM	Beverly Beach, Florida
WBHT	97.1 FM	Mountain Top, Pennsylvania
WBHU	105.5 FM	St. Augustine Beach, Florida
WBHW	88.7 FM	Loogootee, Indiana
WBHX	99.7 FM	Tuckerton, New Jersey
WBHY-FM	88.5 FM	Mobile, Alabama
WBHZ	91.9 FM	Elkins, West Virginia
WBIA	88.3 FM	Shelbyville, Tennessee
WBIB-FM	89.1 FM	Forsyth, Georgia
WBIE	91.5 FM	Delphos, Ohio
WBIG-FM	100.3 FM	Washington, D.C.
WBIJ	88.7 FM	Saluda, South Carolina
WBIK	92.1 FM	Pleasant City, Ohio
WBIM-FM	91.5 FM	Bridgewater, Massachusetts
WBIO	94.7 FM	Philpot, Kentucky
WBIY	88.3 FM	LaBelle, Florida
WBIZ-FM	100.7 FM	Eau Claire, Wisconsin
WBJB-FM	90.5 FM	Lincroft, New Jersey
WBJC	91.5 FM	Baltimore, Maryland
WBJD	91.5 FM	Atlantic Beach, North Carolina
WBJI	98.3 FM	Blackduck, Minnesota
WBJV	88.9 FM	Steubenville, Ohio
WBJW	91.7 FM	Albion, Illinois
WBJY	89.3 FM	Americus, Georgia
WBKA	107.7 FM	Bar Harbor, Maine
WBKC	90.9 FM	Morgantown, Indiana
WBKG	88.9 FM	Macon, Georgia
WBKL	92.7 FM	Clinton, Louisiana
WBKN	92.1 FM	Brookhaven, Mississippi
WBKQ	96.7 FM	Alexandria, Indiana
WBKR	92.5 FM	Owensboro, Kentucky
WBKS	93.9 FM	Columbus Grove, Ohio
WBKT	95.3 FM	Norwich, New York
WBKU	91.7 FM	Ahoskie, North Carolina
WBKV	102.5 FM	Buffalo, New York
WBKX	96.5 FM	Fredonia, New York
WBKY	95.9 FM	Stoughton, Wisconsin
WBKZ	105.1 FM	Havelock, North Carolina
WBLD	89.3 FM	Orchard Lake, Michigan
WBLE	100.5 FM	Batesville, Mississippi
WBLH	92.5 FM	Black River, New York
WBLI	106.1 FM	Patchogue, New York
WBLJ-FM	95.3 FM	Shamokin, Pennsylvania
WBLK	93.7 FM	Depew, New York
WBLM	102.9 FM	Portland, Maine
WBLS	107.5 FM	New York City
WBLU-FM	88.9 FM	Grand Rapids, Michigan
WBLV	90.3 FM	Twin Lake, Michigan
WBLW	88.1 FM	Gaylord, Michigan
WBLX-FM	92.9 FM	Mobile, Alabama
WBMF	88.1 FM	Crete, Illinois
WBMH	106.1 FM	Grove Hill, Alabama
WBMI	105.5 FM	West Branch, Michigan
WBMK	88.5 FM	Morehead, Kentucky
WBMQ	103.7 FM	Metter, Georgia
WBMR	91.7 FM	Telford, Pennsylvania
WBMT	88.3 FM	Boxford, Massachusetts
WBMV	89.7 FM	Mount Vernon, Illinois
WBMW	106.5 FM	Pawcatuck, Connecticut
WBMX	104.1 FM	Boston
WBNB	91.3 FM	Equality, Alabama
WBNH	88.5 FM	Pekin, Illinois
WBNJ	91.9 FM	Barnegat, New Jersey
WBNK	92.7 FM	Pine Knoll Shores, North Carolina
WBNO-FM	100.9 FM	Bryan, Ohio
WBNQ	101.5 FM	Bloomington, Illinois
WBNS-FM	97.1 FM	Columbus, Ohio
WBNT-FM	105.5 FM	Oneida, Tennessee
WBNV	93.5 FM	Barnesville, Ohio
WBNW-FM	105.7 FM	Endicott, New York
WBNY	91.3 FM	Buffalo, New York
WBNZ	92.3 FM	Frankfort, Michigan
WBOC-FM	102.5 FM	Princess Anne, Maryland
WBOI	89.1 FM	Fort Wayne, Indiana
WBON	98.5 FM	Westhampton, New York
WBOO	102.9 FM	Reedsburg, Wisconsin
WBOP	95.5 FM	Buffalo Gap, Virginia
WBOR	91.1 FM	Brunswick, Maine
WBOS	92.9 FM	Brookline, Massachusetts
WBOW	102.7 FM	Terre Haute, Indiana
WBOX-FM	92.9 FM	Varnado, Louisiana
WBOZ	104.9 FM	Woodbury, Tennessee
WBPC	95.1 FM	Ebro, Florida
WBPE	95.3 FM	Brookston, Indiana
WBPM	92.9 FM	Saugerties, New York
WBPR	91.9 FM	Worcester, Massachusetts
WBPT	106.9 FM	Homewood, Alabama
WBPW	96.9 FM	Presque Isle, Maine
WBQA	96.7 FM	Boothbay Harbor, Maine
WBQB	101.5 FM	Fredericksburg, Virginia
WBQE	93.7 FM	Milbridge, Maine
WBQF	91.7 FM	Fryeburg, Maine
WBQK	107.9 FM	West Point, Virginia
WBQO	93.7 FM	Darien, Georgia
WBQQ	99.3 FM	Kennebunk, Maine
WBQT	96.9 FM	Boston, Massachusetts
WBQX	106.9 FM	Thomaston, Maine
WBRB	101.3 FM	Buckhannon, West Virginia
WBRF	98.1 FM	Galax, Virginia
WBRH	90.3 FM	Baton Rouge, Louisiana
WBRK-FM	101.7 FM	Pittsfield, Massachusetts
WBRP	107.3 FM	Baker, Louisiana
WBRR	100.1 FM	Bradford, Pennsylvania
WBRS	100.1 FM	Waltham, Massachusetts
WBRV-FM	101.3 FM	Boonville, New York
WBRW	105.3 FM	Blacksburg, Virginia
WBRX	94.7 FM	Cresson, Pennsylvania
WBSB	89.5 FM	Anderson, Indiana
WBSD	89.1 FM	Burlington, Wisconsin
WBSH	91.1 FM	Hagerstown, Indiana
WBSL-FM	91.7 FM	Sheffield, Massachusetts
WBSN-FM	89.1 FM	New Orleans, Louisiana
WBST	92.1 FM	Muncie, Indiana
WBSU	89.1 FM	Brockport, New York
WBSW	90.9 FM	Marion, Indiana
WBSX	97.9 FM	Hazleton, Pennsylvania
WBSZ	93.3 FM	Ashland, Wisconsin
WBT-FM	107.9 FM	Charlotte, North Carolina
WBTF	107.9 FM	Midway, Kentucky
WBTG-FM	106.3 FM	Sheffield, Alabama
WBTI	96.9 FM	Lexington, Michigan
WBTJ	106.5 FM	Richmond, Virginia
WBTN-FM	93.5 FM	Bennington, Vermont
WBTO-FM	102.3 FM	Petersburg, Indiana
WBTP	106.5 FM	Sarasota, Florida
WBTQ	102.3 FM	Weston, West Virginia
WBTR-FM	92.1 FM	Carrollton, Georgia
WBTT	105.5 FM	Naples Park, Florida
WBTU	93.3 FM	Kendallville, Indiana
WBTY	98.7 FM	Homerville, Georgia
WBTZ	99.9 FM	Plattsburgh, New York
WBUA	92.7 FM	Tisbury, Massachusetts
WBUF	92.9 FM	Buffalo, New York
WBUG-FM	101.1 FM	Fort Plain, New York
WBUH	89.1 FM	Brewster, Massachusetts
WBUK	106.3 FM	Ottawa, Ohio
WBUL-FM	98.1 FM	Lexington, Kentucky
WBUR-FM	90.9 FM	Boston, Massachusetts
WBUS	99.5 FM	Centre Hall, Pennsylvania
WBUV	104.9 FM	Moss Point, Mississippi
WBUX	90.5 FM	Buxton, North Carolina
WBUZ	102.9 FM	La Vergne, Tennessee
WBVB	97.1 FM	Coal Grove, Ohio
WBVE	107.5 FM	Bedford, Pennsylvania
WBVI	96.7 FM	Fostoria, Ohio
WBVM	90.5 FM	Tampa, Florida
WBVN	104.5 FM	Carrier Mills, Illinois
WBVR-FM	106.3 FM	Horse cave, Kentucky
WBVX	92.1 FM	Carlisle, Kentucky
WBWA	89.9 FM	Buffalo, New York
WBWB	96.7 FM	Bloomington, Indiana
WBWC	88.3 FM	Berea, Ohio
WBWL	101.7 FM	Lynn, Massachusetts
WBWN	104.1 FM	Le Roy, Illinois
WBWV	88.7 FM	Beckley, West Virginia
WBWZ	93.3 FM	New Paltz, New York
WBXB	100.1 FM	Edenton, North Carolina
WBXE	93.7 FM	Baxter, Tennessee
WBXL	90.5 FM	Baldwinsville, New York
WBXQ	94.3 FM	Patton, Pennsylvania
WBXX	104.9 FM	Marshall, Michigan
WBYA	105.5 FM	Islesboro, Maine
WBYB	98.3 FM	Cleveland, Mississippi
WBYG	99.5 FM	Point Pleasant, West Virginia
WBYH	89.1 FM	Hawley, Pennsylvania
WBYL	95.5 FM	Salladasburg, Pennsylvania
WBYN-FM	107.5 FM	Boyertown, Pennsylvania
WBYO	88.9 FM	Sellersville, Pennsylvania
WBYP	107.1 FM	Belzoni, Mississippi
WBYR	98.9 FM	Woodburn, Indiana
WBYT	100.7 FM	Elkhart, Indiana
WBYX	88.7 FM	Stroudsburg, Pennsylvania
WBYY	98.7 FM	Somersworth, New Hampshire
WBYZ	94.5 FM	Baxley, Georgia
WBZ-FM	98.5 FM	Boston, Massachusetts
WBZA	98.9 FM	Rochester, New York
WBZC	88.9 FM	Pemberton, New Jersey
WBZD-FM	93.3 FM	Muncy, Pennsylvania
WBZE	98.9 FM	Tallahassee, Florida
WBZF	98.5 FM	Hartsville, South Carolina
WBZG	100.9 FM	Peru, Illinois
WBZK	94.7 FM	Taylor, Mississippi
WBZL	103.3 FM	Greenwood, Mississippi
WBZN	107.3 FM	Old Town, Maine
WBZR-FM	105.9 FM	Atmore, Alabama
WBZW	96.7 FM	Union City, Georgia
WBZX	103.9 FM	Big Rapids, Michigan
WBZY	105.7 FM	Canton, Georgia
WBZZ	100.7 FM	New Kensington, Pennsylvania

== WC-- ==
Callsign	Frequency	City of license
WCAI	90.1 FM	Woods Hole, Massachusetts
WCAL	91.9 FM	California, Pennsylvania
WCAN	93.3 FM	Canajoharie, New York
WCAT-FM	102.3 FM	Carlisle, Pennsylvania
WCBC-FM	107.1 FM	Keyser, West Virginia
WCBE	90.5 FM	Columbus, Ohio
WCBF	96.1 FM	Elmira, New York
WCBH	104.3 FM	Casey, Illinois
WCBJ	103.7 FM	Campton, Kentucky
WCBK-FM	102.3 FM	Martinsville, Indiana
WCBL-FM	99.1 FM	Grand Rivers, Kentucky
WCBN-FM	88.3 FM	Ann Arbor, Michigan
WCBS-FM	101.1 FM	New York City
WCBU	89.9 FM	Peoria, Illinois
WCBW-FM	89.7 FM	East St. Louis, Illinois
WCCC	106.9 FM	Hartford, Connecticut
WCCE	90.1 FM	Buies Creek, North Carolina
WCCG	104.5 FM	Hope Mills, North Carolina
WCCH	103.5 FM	Holyoke, Massachusetts
WCCI	100.3 FM	Savanna, Illinois
WCCK	95.7 FM	Calvert City, Kentucky
WCCN-FM	107.5 FM	Neillsville, Wisconsin
WCCP-FM	104.9 FM	Clemson, South Carolina
WCCQ	98.3 FM	Crest Hill, Illinois
WCCR-FM	92.7 FM	Clarion, Pennsylvania
WCCV	91.7 FM	Cartersville, Georgia
WCCW-FM	107.5 FM	Traverse City, Michigan
WCDA	106.3 FM	Versailles, Kentucky
WCDB	90.9 FM	Albany, New York
WCDE	89.9 FM	Elkins, West Virginia
WCDG	88.7 FM	Dahlonega, Georgia
WCDH	91.5 FM	Shenandoah, Pennsylvania
WCDJ	91.3 FM	Tunkhannock, Pennsylvania
WCDK	106.3 FM	Cadiz, Ohio
WCDN-FM	90.3 FM	Ridgebury, Pennsylvania
WCDO-FM	100.9 FM	Sidney, New York
WCDQ	106.3 FM	Crawfordsville, Indiana
WCDR	90.9 FM	Laporte, Pennsylvania
WCDV-FM	90.1 FM	Trout Run, Pennsylvania
WCDW	106.7 FM	Port Dickinson, New York
WCDX	92.1 FM	Mechanicsville, Virginia
WCDY	107.9 FM	McBain, Michigan
WCDZ	95.1 FM	Dresden, Tennessee
WCEB	94.7 FM	Deposit, New York
WCEF	98.3 FM	Ripley, West Virginia
WCEG	100.3 FM	Delhi, New York
WCEH-FM	98.3 FM	Pinehurst, Georgia
WCEI-FM	96.7 FM	Easton, Maryland
WCEL	91.9 FM	Plattsburgh, New York
WCEM-FM	106.3 FM	Cambridge, Maryland
WCEN-FM	94.5 FM	Hemlock, Michigan
WCER	97.5 FM	Delhi, New York
WCEZ	93.9 FM	Carthage, Illinois
WCFB	94.5 FM	Daytona Beach, Florida
WCFG	90.9 FM	Springfield, Michigan
WCFJ	92.1 FM	Irmo, South Carolina
WCFL	104.7 FM	Morris, Illinois
WCFM	91.9 FM	Williamstown, Massachusetts
WCFS-FM	105.9 FM	Elmwood Park, Illinois
WCFT-FM	106.5 FM	Bloomsburg, Pennsylvania
WCFW	105.7 FM	Chippewa Falls, Wisconsin
WCFX	95.3 FM	Clare, Michigan
WCGH	106.1 FM	Farmington Township, Pennsylvania
WCGN	90.9 FM	Tidioute, Pennsylvania
WCGP	89.3 FM	Silver Creek, New York
WCGQ	107.3 FM	Columbus, Georgia
WCGS	105.9 FM	Little Valley, New York
WCGT	88.7 FM	Clintonville, Pennsylvania
WCGV	89.9 FM	Cambridge Springs, Pennsylvania
WCGY-FM	97.3 FM	Jefferson, New Hampshire
WCHC	88.1 FM	Worcester, Massachusetts
WCHD	99.9 FM	Kettering, Ohio
WCHG	107.1 FM	Hot Springs, Virginia
WCHK-FM	101.3 FM	Milford, Delaware
WCHI-FM	95.5 FM	Chicago
WCHO-FM	105.5 FM	Washington Court House, Ohio
WCHR-FM	105.7 FM	Manahawkin, New Jersey
WCHV-FM	107.5 FM	Charlottesville, Virginia
WCHW-FM	91.3 FM	Bay City, Michigan
WCHX	105.5 FM	Lewistown, Pennsylvania
WCHY	97.7 FM	Cheboygan, Michigan
WCHZ-FM	93.1 FM	Warrenton, Georgia
WCIB	101.9 FM	Falmouth, Massachusetts
WCIC	91.5 FM	Pekin, Illinois
WCID	100.9 FM	Horseheads, New York
WCIE	91.5 FM	New Port Richey, Florida
WCIF	106.3 FM	Melbourne, Florida
WCIG	97.7 FM	Big Flats, New York
WCIH	94.3 FM	Elmira, New York
WCII	88.5 FM	Spencer, New York
WCIJ	88.9 FM	Unadilla, New York
WCIK	103.1 FM	Avoca, New York
WCIL-FM	101.5 FM	Carbondale, Illinois
WCIM	104.9 FM	Montour Falls, New York
WCIN	88.3 FM	Bath, New York
WCIO	96.7 FM	Oswego, New York
WCIP	93.7 FM	Clyde, New York
WCIR-FM	103.7 FM	Beckley, West Virginia
WCIS-FM	105.1 FM	DeRuyter, New York
WCIT-FM	106.3 FM	Oneida, New York
WCIY	88.9 FM	Canandaigua, New York
WCIZ-FM	93.3 FM	Watertown, New York
WCJC	99.3 FM	Van Buren, Indiana
WCJK	96.3 FM	Murfreesboro, Tennessee
WCJL	89.1 FM	Margaret, Alabama
WCJM-FM	100.9 FM	West Point, Georgia
WCJO	97.7 FM	Jackson, Ohio
WCJX	106.5 FM	Five Points, Florida
WCJZ	105.7 FM	Cannelton, Indiana
WCKC	107.1 FM	Cadillac, Michigan
WCKF	100.7 FM	Ashland, Alabama
WCKJ	90.5 FM	St. Johnsbury, Vermont
WCKK	96.7 FM	Walnut Grove, Mississippi
WCKL	97.9 FM	Chicago, Illinois
WCKM-FM	98.5 FM	Lake George, New York
WCKN	92.5 FM	Moncks Corner, South Carolina
WCKQ	104.1 FM	Campbellsville, Kentucky
WCKR	92.1 FM	Hornell, New York
WCKS	102.7 FM	Fruithurst, Alabama
WCKT	107.1 FM	Lehigh Acres, Florida
WCKX	107.5 FM	Columbus, Ohio
WCKY-FM	103.7 FM	Pemberville, Ohio
WCKZ	91.3 FM	Orland, Indiana
WCLC-FM	105.1 FM	Jamestown, Tennessee
WCLD-FM	103.9 FM	Cleveland, Mississippi
WCLE-FM	104.1 FM	Calhoun, Tennessee
WCLG-FM	100.1 FM	Morgantown, West Virginia
WCLH	90.7 FM	Wilkes-Barre, Pennsylvania
WCLI-FM	101.5 FM	Enon, Ohio
WCLK	91.9 FM	Atlanta
WCLN-FM	105.7 FM	Rennert, North Carolina
WCLQ	89.5 FM	Wausau, Wisconsin
WCLR	92.5 FM	DeKalb, Illinois
WCLS	97.7 FM	Spencer, Indiana
WCLT-FM	100.3 FM	Newark, Ohio
WCLV	90.3 FM	Cleveland, Ohio
WCLZ	98.9 FM	North Yarmouth, Maine
WCMB-FM	95.7 FM	Oscoda, Michigan
WCMC-FM	99.9 FM	Creedmoor, North Carolina
WCMD-FM	89.9 FM	Barre, Vermont
WCMF-FM	96.5 FM	Rochester, New York
WCMG	94.3 FM	Latta, South Carolina
WCMI-FM	92.7 FM	Catlettsburg, Kentucky
WCMJ	96.7 FM	Cambridge, Ohio
WCMK	91.9 FM	Putney, Vermont
WCML-FM	91.7 FM	Alpena, Michigan
WCMM	102.5 FM	Gulliver, Michigan
WCMN-FM	107.3 FM	Arecibo, Puerto Rico
WCMO	98.5 FM	Marietta, Ohio
WCMP-FM	100.9 FM	Pine City, Minnesota
WCMQ-FM	92.3 FM	Hialeah, Florida
WCMS-FM	94.5 FM	Hatteras, North Carolina
WCMT-FM	101.3 FM	South Fulton, Tennessee
WCMU-FM	89.5 FM	Mount Pleasant, Michigan
WCMV-FM	94.3 FM	Leland, Michigan
WCMW-FM	103.9 FM	Harbor Springs, Michigan
WCMZ-FM	98.3 FM	Sault Ste. Marie, Michigan
WCNA	95.9 FM	Potts Camp, Mississippi
WCNB	91.5 FM	Dayton, Indiana
WCNG	102.7 FM	Murphy, North Carolina
WCNH	90.5 FM	Concord, New Hampshire
WCNI	90.9 FM	New London, Connecticut
WCNK	98.7 FM	Key West, Florida
WCNM	103.9 FM	Hazlet, New Jersey
WCNO	89.9 FM	Palm City, Florida
WCNP	89.5 FM	Baraboo, Wisconsin
WCNR	106.1 FM	Keswick, Virginia
WCNV	89.1 FM	Heathsville, Virginia
WCNY-FM	91.3 FM	Syracuse, New York
WCOA-FM	88.5 FM	Johnstown, Pennsylvania
WCOB	88.3 FM	State College, Pennsylvania
WCOD-FM	106.1 FM	Hyannis, Massachusetts
WCOE	96.7 FM	La Porte, Indiana
WCOF	89.5 FM	Arcade, New York
WCOG-FM	100.7 FM	Galeton, Pennsylvania
WCOH	107.3 FM	Du Bois, Pennsylvania
WCOL-FM	92.3 FM	Columbus, Ohio
WCOM-FM	90.7 FM	Kendall, New York
WCON-FM	99.3 FM	Cornelia, Georgia
WCOO	105.5 FM	Kiawah Island, South Carolina
WCOP	103.9 FM	Eldred, Pennsylvania
WCOQ	101.9 FM	Alfred (village), New York
WCOR-FM	96.7 FM	Lewis Run, Pennsylvania
WCOS-FM	97.5 FM	Columbia, South Carolina
WCOU	88.3 FM	Attica, New York
WCOV-FM	89.1 FM	Friendship, New York
WCOW-FM	97.1 FM	Sparta, Wisconsin
WCOX	91.1 FM	Bedford, Pennsylvania
WCOY	99.5 FM	Quincy, Illinois
WCOZ	91.7 FM	New Albany, Pennsylvania
WCPE	89.7 FM	Raleigh, North Carolina
WCPI	91.3 FM	McMinnville, Tennessee
WCPN	104.9 FM	Lorain, Ohio
WCPR-FM	97.9 FM	Wiggins, Mississippi
WCPV	101.3 FM	Essex, New York
WCPY	92.7 FM	Arlington Heights, Illinois
WCPZ	102.7 FM	Sandusky, Ohio
WCQC	91.3 FM	Clarksdale, Mississippi
WCQL	95.9 FM	Queensbury, New York
WCQM	98.3 FM	Park Falls, Wisconsin
WCQR-FM	88.3 FM	Kingsport, Tennessee
WCQS	88.1 FM	Asheville, North Carolina
WCRB	99.5 FM	Lowell, Massachusetts
WCRC	95.7 FM	Effingham, Illinois
WCRD	91.3 FM	Muncie, Indiana
WCRF-FM	103.3 FM	Cleveland, Ohio
WCRG	90.7 FM	Williamsport, Pennsylvania
WCRH	90.5 FM	Williamsport, Maryland
WCRI-FM	95.9 FM	Block Island, Rhode Island
WCRJ	88.1 FM	Jacksonville, Florida
WCRP	88.1 FM	Guayama, Puerto Rico
WCRQ	102.9 FM	Dennysville, Maine
WCRR	88.9 FM	Manistique, Michigan
WCRT-FM	88.5 FM	Terre Haute, Indiana
WCRX	88.1 FM	Chicago
WCRZ	107.9 FM	Flint, Michigan
WCSB	89.3 FM	Cleveland, Ohio
WCSF	88.7 FM	Joliet, Illinois
WCSG	91.3 FM	Grand Rapids, Michigan
WCSJ-FM	103.1 FM	Morris, Illinois
WCSK	90.3 FM	Kingsport, Tennessee
WCSM-FM	96.7 FM	Celina, Ohio
WCSN-FM	105.7 FM	Orange Beach, Alabama
WCSO	90.5 FM	Columbus, Mississippi
WCSP-FM	90.1 FM	Washington, D.C.
WCSR-FM	92.1 FM	Hillsdale, Michigan
WCST-FM	98.7 FM	Pocatalico, West Virginia
WCSU-FM	88.9 FM	Wilberforce, Ohio
WCSW	88.1 FM	Arrowsmith, Illinois
WCSX	94.7 FM	Birmingham, Michigan
WCSY-FM	103.7 FM	Hartford, Michigan
WCTB	93.5 FM	Fairfield, Maine
WCTG	96.5 FM	West Pocomoke, Maryland
WCTH	100.3 FM	Plantation Key, Florida
WCTK	98.1 FM	New Bedford, Massachusetts
WCTL	106.3 FM	Erie, Pennsylvania
WCTO	96.1 FM	Easton, Pennsylvania
WCTP	88.5 FM	Gagetown, Michigan
WCTQ	92.1 FM	Venice, Florida
WCTT-FM	107.3 FM	Corbin, Kentucky
WCTW	98.5 FM	Catskill, New York
WCTY	97.7 FM	Norwich, Connecticut
WCUC-FM	91.7 FM	Clarion, Pennsylvania
WCUG	88.5 FM	Lumpkin, Georgia
WCUP	105.7 FM	L'Anse, Michigan
WCUR	91.7 FM	West Chester, Pennsylvania
WCUW	91.3 FM	Worcester, Massachusetts
WCVE-FM	88.9 FM	Richmond, Virginia
WCVF-FM	88.9 FM	Fredonia, New York
WCVH	90.5 FM	Flemington, New Jersey
WCVJ	90.9 FM	Jefferson, Ohio
WCVK	90.7 FM	Bowling Green, Kentucky
WCVL-FM	92.7 FM	Charlottesville, Virginia
WCVM	94.7 FM	Bronson, Michigan
WCVO	104.9 FM	Gahanna, Ohio
WCVP-FM	95.9 FM	Robbinsville, North Carolina
WCVQ	107.9 FM	Fort Campbell, Kentucky
WCVS-FM	96.7 FM	Virden, Illinois
WCVT	101.7 FM	Stowe, Vermont
WCVU	104.9 FM	Solana, Florida
WCVV	89.5 FM	Belpre, Ohio
WCVY	91.5 FM	Coventry, Rhode Island
WCWB	104.9 FM	Marathon, Wisconsin
WCWI	106.1 FM	Adams, Wisconsin
WCWM	90.9 FM	Williamsburg, Virginia
WCWP	88.1 FM	Brookville, New York
WCWT-FM	101.5 FM	Centerville, Ohio
WCWV	92.9 FM	Summersville, West Virginia
WCXB	89.9 FM	Benton Harbor, Michigan
WCXK	88.3 FM	Kalamazoo, Michigan
WCXL	104.1 FM	Kill Devil Hills, North Carolina
WCXO	96.7 FM	Carlyle, Illinois
WCXR	103.7 FM	Lewisburg, Pennsylvania
WCXT	98.3 FM	Hartford, Michigan
WCXU	97.7 FM	Caribou, Maine
WCXV	98.1 FM	Van Buren, Maine
WCXX	102.3 FM	Madawaska, Maine
WCYE	93.7 FM	Three Lakes, Wisconsin
WCYJ-FM	99.5 FM	Waynesburg, Pennsylvania
WCYK-FM	99.7 FM	Staunton, Virginia
WCYO	100.7 FM	Irvine, Kentucky
WCYQ	100.3 FM	Oak Ridge, Tennessee
WCYT	91.1 FM	Lafayette Township, Indiana
WCYY	94.3 FM	Biddeford, Maine
WCYZ	99.7 FM	Ocala, Florida
WCZE	103.7 FM	Harbor Beach, Michigan
WCZR	101.7 FM	Vero Beach, Florida
WCZT	98.7 FM	Villas, New Jersey
WCZX	97.7 FM	Hyde Park, New York
WCZY-FM	104.3 FM	Mount Pleasant, Michigan

== See also ==
- North American call sign
