= KNHS =

KNHS may refer to:

- Koninklijke Nederlandsche Hoogovens en Staalfabrieken, Netherlands based steelmaker
- Keystone National High School
- KNHS-LP, a low-power radio station (93.1 FM) licensed to serve Lafayette, Louisiana, United States
- KNHS (California), a former high school radio station in Torrance, California, United States; a defunct radio station
- Kingsgrove North High School, a high school in Sydney, Australia
- Koninklijke Nederlandse Hippische Sportfederatie (KNHS), Dutch National Equestrian Federation
