= WBVC =

WBVC may refer to:

- WBVC (The CW Plus), a cable/satellite television station in Traverse City, Michigan, United States
- WBVC (FM), a defunct radio station (91.1 FM) formerly licensed to Pomfret, Connecticut, United States
