= CHOP-FM =

Radio station in Newmarket, Ontario

Coordinates: 44.0470°N 79.4520°W

- Newmarket, Ontario; Canada
- Frequency: 102.7 MHz
- Branding: 102.7 CHOP-FM

Programming
- Format: High school

Ownership
- Owner: Pickering College

History
- First air date: September 28, 2007

Technical information
- Class: LP
- ERP: 5 watts

Links
- Website: pickeringcollege.on.ca/athletics-arts/1027-chop-fm

CHOP-FM is a high school radio station that operates at 102.7 FM in Newmarket, Ontario, Canada.

Owned by Pickering College, the station began broadcasting on September 28, 2007, after it was given approval by the Canadian Radio-television and Telecommunications Commission (CRTC) on February 1, 2007. The station was modelled after another high school radio station in the province called CKVI-FM located in Kingston.

On November 12, 2021, the CRTC issued a call for comments on market capacity to serve Newmarket, Ontario and call for applications to serve Newmarket. The station also submitted an application to increase CHOP-FM's effective radiated power (ERP) from 5 watts LP to 100 watts class A1.

On December 5, 2022, Pickering College Campus Radio submitted an application to operate an English language community FM radio station at Newmarket which would operate at 102.7 MHz (channel 274A1) with an average effective radiated power (ERP) of 33.5 watts (maximum ERP of 100 watts, and an effective height of the antenna above average terrain [EHAAT] of 9 metres). The CRTC approved Pickering College's application on August 7, 2023.
