= KMIH =

Radio station at Mercer Island High School in Mercer Island, Washington

Coordinates: 47.572°N 122.219°W

- Mercer Island, Washington; United States
- Broadcast area: Seattle, Washington
- Frequency: 88.9 MHz
- Branding: 88.9 The Bridge

Programming
- Format: AAA

Ownership
- Owner: Mercer Island School District #400

History
- First air date: 1978 (at 90.1)
- Call sign meaning: Mercer Island High School

Technical information
- Licensing authority: FCC
- Facility ID: 41205
- Class: D
- ERP: 30 watts
- HAAT: 69 meters

Links
- Public license information: Public file; LMS
- Webcast: Listen Live
- Website: https://889thebridge.org/

KMIH (88.9 FM) is a high school radio station broadcasting an adult album alternative format. Licensed to Mercer Island, Washington, United States, the station is owned by Mercer Island School District, with studios at Mercer Island High School.

This station is one of three high school radio stations in the Seattle Metro area, the other two being KNHC, and KASB. KMIH is the only FM service licensed to the City of Mercer Island and as such is used as one of the primary emergency communication methods for the city. KMIH 88.9 The Bridge is run by the student staff of Mercer Island High School.

== History ==
Prior to its move to 88.9, KMIH broadcast at 104.5, when through a series of FM realignments, KMCQ, a station licensed to The Dalles, Oregon, was relocated to nearby Covington, Washington. This resulted in KMIH being relocated to its current frequency because of its class-D status, but was allowed to stay at the 104.5 frequency as they worked out an arrangement that allowed KMCQ to do testing during KMIH's off-air hours until the transition was completed. On August 27, 2008, KMIH and KMCQ finalized the move. KMIH also has a translator at 94.5 transmitting from Capitol Hill to cover downtown Seattle, which is not covered by 88.9's 30-watt signal. The translator was sold to Bonneville International in late 2016, dropping its simulcast of KMIH to become a translator for Bonneville's KTTH. On January 31, 2017, after a period of stunting, KMIH dropped their rhythmic CHR format and flipped to AAA, branded as "The Bridge." In late December 2019, KMIH has partnered with Transistor.fm to bring their shows onto streaming services like Spotify and Apple Music.

== Sports ==
For the 2011–2012 season, Ryan Roulliard began calling play-by-play for his senior project. He received many positive reviews and was joined midseason by freshman radio student Luke Mounger, a color analyst. During the 2012–2013 season, Mounger took over for Rouillard's duties, as he began calling play-by-play being joined by Brady Baker, Sam Peterson, and Daniel Mayer as color analysts. During the 2013–2014 season, Mounger and Baker called over 30 games together, becoming the top pairing for Mercer Island Basketball on Hot Jamz Radio.
