= WFHS =

WFHS may refer to:

- WFHS-LP, a defunct radio station (92.7 FM) formerly licensed to serve Fern Creek, Kentucky, United States
- West Florida High School of Advanced Technology, Pensacola, Florida, United States
- West Forsyth High School (Georgia), Cumming, Georgia, United States
- West Forsyth High School (North Carolina), Clemens, North Carolina, United States
- West Franklin High School, Pomona, Kansas, United States
- Wichita Falls High School, Wichita Falls, Texas, United States
- William Floyd High School, Brookhaven, New York, United States
- William Fremd High School, Palatine, Illinois, United States
- Williams Field High School, Gilbert, Arizona, United States
- Windsor Forest High School, Savannah, Georgia, United States
- West Fargo High School, West Fargo, North Dakota, United States
