= WYAJ =

Radio station at Lincoln-Sudbury Regional High School

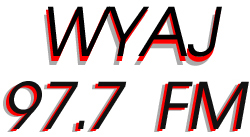
- Sudbury, Massachusetts; United States
- Frequency: 97.7 MHz
- Branding: WYAJ 97.7 FM

Programming
- Language: English
- Format: High school radio

Ownership
- Owner: Lincoln-Sudbury Regional High School; (Sudbury Valley Broadcasting Foundation)

History
- First air date: September 1980
- Last air date: June 16, 2020
- Former frequencies: 88.1 MHz

Technical information
- Licensing authority: FCC
- Facility ID: 63608
- Class: D
- ERP: 4 watts
- HAAT: 67 meters (220 ft)
- Transmitter coordinates: 42°22′30.3″N 71°24′26.2″W

Links
- Public license information: Public file; LMS

WYAJ (97.7 FM, "Over the Edge Radio") was a radio station licensed to serve Sudbury, Massachusetts. The station was last owned by Lincoln-Sudbury Regional High School and licensed to the Sudbury Valley Broadcasting Foundation. It aired a high school radio format.

Greg Hill, host of the Hill-man Morning Show on WAAF in Boston, got his start in radio on WYAJ when he was hired by student station manager Richard Lyons (host of the Megarock Show and one of the first on-air personalities in 1980).

Geoff Scott, former WBZ-FM traffic reporter in Boston and 20-year Northwest radio icon (Afternoons, Rock 94.5 KHTQ & Evenings, Rock106 KEZE Spokane, Washington) also got his start in broadcasting on WYAJ as host of "The Brainmelter Show" (1982–1988).

Other 1980s alumni of WYAJ include American music industry executive Gerard Cosloy; future Hüsker Dü manager David Savoy; Vermont Public Radio reporter Amy Kolb Noyes; WENY-TV sportscaster and Emmy award-winning Fox Sports producer Mike Isenberg.

Alumni from the 1990s include John Cavooto, well-known comic book writer; Jennifer Schandlemyer, fitness model; and Rob Marco local Boston comic and Internet personality.

The station was assigned the WYAJ call letters by the Federal Communications Commission.

The station had a very small reach due to WZRM, a much stronger signal from Brockton, Massachusetts, interfering with WYAJ even in some parts of Sudbury.

WYAJ went off the air June 16, 2020. Its license was cancelled on April 4, 2022, due to failing to file a renewal application.
