= WWTA =

Marion, Massachusetts; United States
- Broadcast area: New Bedford, Massachusetts
- Frequency: 88.5 MHz

Programming
- Format: High school radio

Ownership
- Owner: Tabor Academy

History
- First air date: 1993
- Last air date: April 1, 2014 (date of license expiration)

Technical information
- Facility ID: 64500
- Class: A
- ERP: 100 watts
- HAAT: 16 meters (52 ft)
- Transmitter coordinates: 41°42′32″N 70°45′57″W

WWTA (88.5 FM) was a high school radio station licensed to Marion, Massachusetts, United States. The station served the New Bedford-Fall River area. WWTA was owned by Tabor Academy. Its license expired April 1, 2014 after Tabor Academy did not renew it.
