= WPHP =

- Wheeling, West Virginia; United States
- Frequency: 91.9 MHz
- Branding: The All New 92

Programming
- Format: Contemporary Hit Radio

Ownership
- Owner: Ohio County Board Of Education

History
- Call sign meaning: Wheeling Park High Patriots

Technical information
- Licensing authority: FCC
- Facility ID: 50129
- Class: A
- ERP: 100 watts
- HAAT: 79 meters (259 feet)
- Transmitter coordinates: 40°04′07″N 80°39′04″W

Links
- Public license information: Public file; LMS
- Webcast: WPHP Webstream
- Website: WPHP Online

WPHP (91.9 FM) is a high school radio station broadcasting a Contemporary Hit Radio music format. Licensed to Wheeling, West Virginia, United States, it serves the greater Wheeling area. The station is currently owned by the Ohio County Board Of Education and is operated by the students of Wheeling Park High School.
