= WOVI =

Coordinates: 42.464°N 83.491°W

- Novi, Michigan; United States
- Frequency: 89.5 MHz
- Branding: Voice of the Wildcats

Programming
- Format: Variety; High school station

Ownership
- Owner: Novi Community Schools

History
- First air date: September 6, 1978
- Call sign meaning: Novi High School

Technical information
- Licensing authority: FCC
- Class: A
- Power: 100 watts

Links
- Public license information: Public file; LMS

WOVI (89.5 MHz) is a full-service high school radio station in Novi, Michigan. One of its slogans is "Real Radio."

The station broadcasts from Novi High School with 100 watts. It offers a variety of music hosted by students who are considering life in the radio market after high school.

The station was run by David Legg, former head of the broadcasting department at Novi High School. The stations signal can only be heard within the Novi city limits in parts of Northville and Wixom.
