= WGAG-FM =

High school radio station in Orlando, Florida (1977–1981)

Orlando, Florida; United States
- Frequency: 89.3 MHz
- Branding: FM 89

Programming
- Format: Variety

Ownership
- Owner: Oak Ridge High School

History
- First air date: November 3, 1977
- Last air date: 1981
- Call sign meaning: "Green and Gold"

Technical information
- Facility ID: 49924
- Class: D
- ERP: 10 watts
- Transmitter coordinates: 28°28′15″N 81°23′15″W

WGAG-FM was a high school radio station at Oak Ridge High School in Orlando, Florida. The station operated on 89.3 MHz between 1977 and 1981.

== History ==
On September 29, 1975, Oak Ridge applied for a construction permit for a new 10-watt noncommercial radio station to serve Orlando. The application, backed by faculty adviser and station manager Jack Howard, was approved in October 1976. WGAG-FM "FM 89", also known as "Green and Gold Radio" for the school's colors, began regular programming on November 3, 1977. Its regular programming included rock, beautiful music and easy listening programs, along with military-sponsored programs and political commentaries by the school's student body president as well as local and school news. Initially broadcasting from 6:30 a.m. to 6:30 p.m., its broadcast day was extended to 9 p.m. by 1979.

WGAG-FM operated with an array of equipment donated by seven local radio and television stations, as well as donated records and lumber for construction. Its transmitter had been manufactured in 1947, and the age of the donated equipment presented issues at times for staff. The station, operated by the school's radio club, ran on a shoestring budget: $200 a year, brought in by selling doughnuts and clearing lawns.

Oak Ridge's radio station, however, quickly found an insurmountable obstacle: a major change in Federal Communications Commission regulations relating to Class D 10-watt radio stations. In 1978, the FCC announced it would cease licensing new Class D stations and encouraged as many as possible to upgrade to "full-service" Class A operation, with an effective radiated power of at least 100 watts. The power increase was a financial impossibility for Oak Ridge High School, resulting in the closure of WGAG-FM in 1981 and the school instead pursuing the idea of creating a television production studio to be operated by students.
