= WNMH =

Radio station at Northfield Mount Hermon School

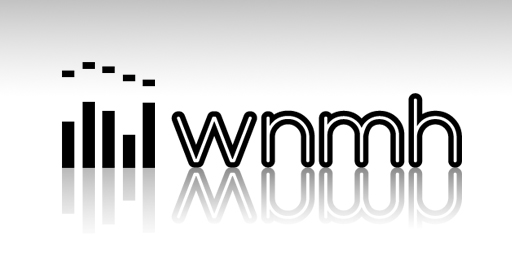
- Northfield, Massachusetts; United States
- Frequency: 91.5 MHz
- Branding: Hogger Radio

Programming
- Format: High school radio
- Affiliations: ABC Radio

Ownership
- Owner: Northfield Mount Hermon School

History
- First air date: September 10, 1984
- Last air date: September 28, 2010 (date of license cancellation)
- Call sign meaning: Northfield Mount Hermon

Technical information
- Facility ID: 49654
- Class: A
- ERP: 235 watts
- HAAT: −83 meters (−272 ft)
- Transmitter coordinates: 42°42′52.00″N 72°26′38.00″W

WNMH is a high school radio station broadcasting a Variety format. The station is owned by Northfield Mount Hermon School. From 1984 until 2010, the station was licensed to operate on 91.5 FM from Northfield, Massachusetts, United States and featured programming from ABC Radio. From 2014 until 2017, Northfield Mount Hermon School held a construction permit for a low-power FM station, WNMH-LP (106.7 FM) in Mount Hermon (a section of Gill), which would have restored WNMH's programming to the FM dial. As of April 2017, WNMH continues to operate as an Internet radio station on wnmh.live.

== History ==
previous logo

WNMH signed on September 10, 1984. The station's license at Northfield was cancelled by the Federal Communications Commission (FCC) on September 28, 2010 when the campus was sold.

The FCC granted a new construction permit on April 21, 2014, to broadcast FM from the NMH campus at Mount Hermon (in Gill, Massachusetts) from the studios in Crossley Hall. WNMH Radio has webcast its signal continuously over the years, beginning with Christmas Vespers in 2004. The construction permit expired on April 21, 2017; the FCC canceled the permit that day.
