= WEDM =

High school radio station in Indianapolis, Indiana

- Indianapolis, Indiana; United States
- Frequency: 91.1 MHz
- Branding: ED91

Programming
- Format: Variety

Ownership
- Owner: Warren Central High School; (Metropolitan School District of Warren Township)

History
- First air date: 1970; 56 years ago

Technical information
- Licensing authority: FCC
- Facility ID: 41402
- Class: A
- ERP: 180 watts
- HAAT: 66 meters
- Transmitter coordinates: 39°47′29″N 85°59′53″W

Links
- Public license information: Public file; LMS
- Website: www.wedmfm.com

WEDM (91.1 FM) is a high school radio station broadcasting from the Walker Career Center at Warren Central High School in Indianapolis, Indiana, United States. The station is currently owned by the Metropolitan School District of Warren Township. WEDM (Branded as "ED91") is operated by its students with faculty supervision. When students are on spring or summer break the station is operated by the faculty. The format of the station is Variety, mainly Pop rock and country.

== History ==
WEDM was one of the first high school radio stations in Marion County.
