= KUBS =

- Newport, Washington; United States
- Frequency: 91.5 MHz

Programming
- Format: Country

Ownership
- Owner: Newport Consolidated School District #56415

History
- First air date: September 10, 1973

Technical information
- Licensing authority: FCC
- Facility ID: 48751
- Class: A
- ERP: 150 watts
- HAAT: 224 meters (735 ft)
- Transmitter coordinates: 48°10′42.00″N 117°4′59.00″W

Links
- Public license information: Public file; LMS
- Webcast: Listen Live
- Website: kubsradio.com

KUBS (91.5 FM) is a high school radio station broadcasting a country music format. Licensed to Newport, Washington, United States, the station is currently owned by Newport Consolidated School District #56415.
