= WSHJ =

Coordinates: 42.470°N 83.264°W

- Southfield, Michigan; United States
- Broadcast area: Metro Detroit Area
- Frequency: 88.3 MHz
- Branding: 88.3 WSHJ, Southfield

Programming
- Format: Urban Contemporary; High school station

Ownership
- Owner: Southfield Public Schools

History
- First air date: February 28, 1967
- Call sign meaning: Southfield High BlueJays

Technical information
- Licensing authority: FCC
- Facility ID: 65449
- Class: A
- ERP: 105 watts
- HAAT: 21 meters

Links
- Public license information: Public file; LMS

WSHJ (88.3 FM) is a high school radio station broadcasting an Urban Contemporary format. Licensed to Southfield, Michigan it first began broadcasting in 1967.
