= WWPT =

- Westport, Connecticut; United States
- Frequency: 90.3 MHz
- Branding: Wrecker Radio

Programming
- Format: High School

Ownership
- Owner: Staples High School; (Westport Connecticut Board of Education)
- Sister stations: STN-The Staples Television Network

History
- First air date: 1973; 53 years ago
- Call sign meaning: WestPorT

Technical information
- Licensing authority: FCC
- Facility ID: 72035
- Class: A
- ERP: 330 watts
- HAAT: 39 meters (128 ft)
- Transmitter coordinates: 41°10′19″N 73°19′43″W

Links
- Public license information: Public file; LMS
- Webcast: Listen live
- Website: On school website: shs.westportps.org/departments/media/media-lab Radio site: wwptfm.org

WWPT (90.3 FM, "Wrecker Radio") is a high school radio station licensed to serve Westport, Connecticut. The station is owned by Staples High School and licensed to the Westport Board of Education. It airs a high school radio format.

The station was assigned the WWPT call letters by the Federal Communications Commission.

WWPT broadcasts all Staples football games, as well as most other Staples sporting events. There are also student DJ shows from 2:30pm to 9:30pm Monday through Friday and 12:00pm to 4:00pm on Saturdays during the school year.

In 2009, WWPT began broadcast via internet.

In 2011, WWPT was named the best high school radio station from the John Drury National High School Radio Awards.

In 2015, WWPT was named the number two high school radio station in the country from the John Drury National High School Radio Awards. For the first time in the program's history the station won the John Drury National High School Radio Award for best sports play by play, won by Cooper Boardman, Adam Kaplan, and Zach Edelman.

In 2016, members of WWPT placed as finalists in 14 categories in the national IBS high school radio awards. Cooper Boardman and Jack Caldwell won for Best Football Play-By-Play, with Cooper Boardman winning Best Use of YouTube and Best Basketball Play-By-Play.

Shortly after success at the 2016 IBS Awards, members of WWPT were nominated for a total 17 John Drury National High School Radio Awards, 6 more than any other station in the country. Nominations spanned several categories including Best Newscast, Best Sports Talk Program, and Best Play-By-Play. At the May Awards ceremonies in Naperville, Illinois, WWPT students won first place in every category they were nominated in, winning 6 total first-place awards. WWPT was also named the number one high school radio station in the country for the first time since 2011.

In 2017, WWPT was named the best high school radio station for the third time ever and second consecutive year from the John Drury National High School Radio Awards.

In 2019, again at the John Drury National High School Radio Awards, WWPT once again walked away with the number 1 station in the country. They also came home with multiple individual first place awards including - Best News Feature Story by Jake Gersh and Cameron Manna, best sports play by play by Greg Settos and Jake Gersh, and Best sportscast by Greg Settos.

In 2025, WWPT was once again named the best Radio Station in America by the John Drury National High School Radio Awards.
