= WQTQ =

Coordinates: 41.79639°N 72.69500°W

- Hartford, Connecticut; United States
- Broadcast area: Greater Hartford
- Frequency: 89.9 MHz
- Branding: Qute 89.9 FM

Programming
- Format: Urban contemporary

Ownership
- Owner: Hartford Public Schools; (Hartford Board of Education)

History
- First air date: October 15, 1973

Technical information
- Licensing authority: FCC
- Facility ID: 26311
- Class: A
- ERP: 115 watts
- HAAT: 26 meters (85 ft)

Links
- Public license information: Public file; LMS
- Webcast: Listen live
- Website: sites.google.com/hartfordschools.org/wqtq/home

WQTQ (89.9 FM) is a high school radio station licensed to the Hartford Board of Education and operates out of Weaver High School in Hartford, Connecticut. Operating with 112 watts from a tower on top of the Oak Hill School in Hartford, the station has thousands of listeners throughout Hartford County.

The station is unusual among high school radio stations for its urban contemporary format and the fact that the station is operated at an inner city (as opposed to suburban or rural) high school.

WQTQ provides a training ground for high school students interested in broadcasting and serves the community with unique programming.

== History ==
WQTQ was originally licensed in 1973, with 10 watts on 88.3 MHz with a small antenna on top of the Weaver High School building on Granby St. in Hartford. The low height of this antenna along with the low power and poor frequency (right between two other, more powerful stations) resulted in very limited coverage. In the mid seventies, Harold Dorschug, VP of Engineering for WTIC arranged for WQTQ's to move to 89.9 MHz, a much clearer frequency. He also moved transmitter to the roof of the Oak Hill School for the Blind on Holcomb Street in Hartford. The new frequency allowed the power to be increased to 63 watts and the new location, at one of the highest points in the city of Hartford, resulted in greatly expanded coverage. In 1998, the power was increased to 112 watts securing the future of the station by making it a "primary" Class A station in the eyes of the FCC.
