= WRFT =

- Indianapolis, Indiana; United States
- Broadcast area: Indianapolis area
- Frequency: 91.5 MHz
- Branding: 91.5 Flash FM

Programming
- Format: High school radio

Ownership
- Owner: Franklin Township Community School Corporation

History
- First air date: 1978
- Call sign meaning: "We R Franklin Township"; "Radio Franklin Township"

Technical information
- Licensing authority: FCC
- Facility ID: 22366
- Class: A
- ERP: 130 watts
- HAAT: 54 meters (177 ft)
- Transmitter coordinates: 39°40′33″N 86°00′56″W

Links
- Public license information: Public file; LMS

WRFT (91.5 FM) is a high school radio station broadcasting from Franklin Central High School in Indianapolis, Indiana, United States. The station is currently owned by Franklin Township Community School Corporation.

WRFT is a high school radio station operating at 91.5FM. It is located in the southern part of Indianapolis in Franklin Township and is housed in Franklin Central High School. The station has 130 watts of power and covers about two-thirds of Indianapolis. WRFT has always been operated by high school students with a general manager in charge of the overall operation. It is on the air 24 hours a day, every day of the year after going automated three years ago.

Generally, WRFT programs to serve Franklin Township and broadcasts programs and announcements pertaining to the immediate area. WRFT was the first station in the area, and one of the first in the state, to feature a regular remote broadcast during the high school football season. "The Friday Morning Sports Show," originates from the local Chick-fil-A every Friday morning from 6–7 o'clock.
