= KOHS =

Radio station of Orem High School in Orem, Utah

- Orem, Utah; United States
- Broadcast area: Salt Lake City
- Frequency: 91.7 MHz

Programming
- Format: Alternative rock

Ownership
- Owner: Orem High School; (Alpine School District Orem High School)

History
- First air date: November 1, 1974
- Former frequencies: 91.5 MHz (1974–1980)
- Call sign meaning: Orem High School

Technical information
- Licensing authority: FCC
- Facility ID: 1169
- Class: A
- ERP: 1,750 watts
- HAAT: −265 meters (−869 ft)
- Transmitter coordinates: 40°17′32″N 111°40′58″W

Links
- Public license information: Public file; LMS
- Website: kohsorem.org

KOHS (91.7 FM) is a non-profit non-commercial educational high school radio station broadcasting an alternative music format. The radio station is licensed by the Federal Communications Commission (FCC) to serve the community of Orem, Utah. The radio station is owned by the Alpine School District and operated by the students of Orem High School.
