= KPGR =

Radio station at Pleasant Grove High School in Pleasant Grove, Utah

- Pleasant Grove, Utah; United States
- Broadcast area: Salt Lake City, Utah
- Frequency: 88.1 MHz
- Branding: Voice of the Vikings

Programming
- Format: High school radio

Ownership
- Owner: Alpine School District

History
- First air date: 1982
- Call sign meaning: Pleasant Grove Radio

Technical information
- Facility ID: 1170
- Class: A
- ERP: 115 watts
- HAAT: −344.0 meters (−1,128.6 ft)
- Transmitter coordinates: 40°21′37.44″N 111°43′27.57″W

Links
- Website: KPGR website

KPGR (88.1 FM) is a radio station broadcasting a high school radio format. Licensed to Pleasant Grove, Utah, United States, the station is owned by Alpine School District. Students at Pleasant Grove High School take a beginning radio class as sophomores and juniors; those who pass the class try out for DJ positions on the radio, and only 26 students are chosen. KPGR is completely run by students from 6:45 a.m. to 9:30 p.m., Monday through Friday; on weekends and holidays the station is run by an automated system.
