= WLLO-LP =

- Londonderry, New Hampshire; United States
- Broadcast area: Manchester, New Hampshire
- Frequency: 102.9 MHz
- Branding: Leo 103

Programming
- Format: High school radio

Ownership
- Owner: Londonderry School District

Technical information
- Licensing authority: FCC
- Facility ID: 125532
- Class: L1
- ERP: 100 watts
- HAAT: 28.3 meters
- Transmitter coordinates: 42°55′8″N 71°23′51″W

Links
- Public license information: LMS
- Webcast: Listen Live (via Player); Listen Live (MP3 URL)
- Website: londonderry.org

WLLO-LP (102.9 FM, "Leo 103") is a high school radio station broadcasting a High school radio format. Programming includes rock, country, big band, and children's programming. Licensed to Londonderry, New Hampshire, United States, the station serves the Manchester area. Broadcasts can also be heard on cable FM channel 28 of the local cable TV system. The station is currently owned by Londonderry School District, School Administrative Unit 12 as an Educational-access television channel.

== See also ==
- High school radio
