= WWDS =

DWWDS
Muncie, Indiana; United States
- Broadcast area: Muncie-Marion
- Frequency: 90.5 MHz

Programming
- Format: Defunct (formerly Variety)

Ownership
- Owner: Delaware Community School Corp.

History
- First air date: April 3, 1979
- Former call signs: WWDS-FM (1979-?)

Technical information
- Licensing authority: FCC
- Facility ID: 16439
- Class: A
- ERP: 100 watts
- HAAT: 53.0 meters
- Transmitter coordinates: 40°16′42.00″N 85°20′52.00″W

Links
- Public license information: Public file; LMS

WWDS (90.5 FM) was a high school radio station broadcasting a variety music format. Formerly licensed to Muncie, Indiana, United States, the radio station served the Muncie-Marion area. The station was owned by Delaware Community School Corp.

== History ==
The station went on the air as WWDS-FM on May 3, 1979. However, a tape recording of this station testing prior to July 4, 1978, suggests that WWDS may have been on the air earlier. On July 18, 1979, the station's call sign was changed to WWDS.

On September 16, 2010, the station's license was cancelled by the Federal Communications Commission and its call sign deleted from its database.
