= WOAS =

Coordinates: 46.875°N 89.300°W

- Ontonagon, Michigan; United States
- Broadcast area: Ontonagon, Michigan
- Frequency: 91.5 MHz
- Branding: Community Radio

Programming
- Format: Variety; educational station

Ownership
- Owner: Ontonagon School District

History
- First air date: December 15, 1978
- Call sign meaning: Ontonagon Area Schools

Technical information
- Licensing authority: FCC
- Facility ID: 50373
- Class: D
- Power: 4 watts
- ERP: 4 watts

Links
- Public license information: Public file; LMS
- Webcast: Listen live
- Website: woas-fm.org

WOAS is an American educational high school radio station that broadcasts a variety style music format on 91.5 MHz. The studio and transmitter tower is located at the Ontonagon Area School building. The Ontonagon Area School District holds ownership and U.S. Federal Communications Commission (FCC) licensing for the station. Operation of the station is conducted by an all volunteer staff that includes students of the Ontonagon Area Schools and local community members.

== Hours ==
WOAS broadcasts on weekdays from 8 a.m. to 10 p.m. ET during the school year. The station also does selective broadcasting in August in conjunction with the Porcupine Mountains Music Festival, held at the Porcupine Mountains Wilderness State Park.

Station office hours are on weekdays from 9 a.m. to 3 p.m. ET during the school year. The station office is located within the Ontonagon Area School building.

== Programming ==
WOAS features on-air student disc jockey programs typically in one-hour blocks from 8 a.m. to 3:30 p.m. After 3:30 p.m., the station features an assortment of on-air disc jockey programs hosted by local community members and syndicated shows. Weekly syndicated shows include: "Beale Street Caravan", "Midnight Special", "PorkiesFest Radio", "Dr Duck's Rx for Guitar", "Woodsongs Old Time Radio Hour", "Acoustic Rainbow" and a variety of artists from the "Home Grown Music Network".

The variety format allows students and community staff to program their personal preference of genre during their respective on-air shows as long as it complies with the "terms-of-broadcast" concerning profanity and other points. Some local production of PSAs and promotional materials is also done by the station volunteers.

WOAS features a complete digital media system including three Compact Disc (CD) players, a Computerized Media Processor (CMP) and 3.5-mm headphone connectors input jacks for mobile media devices. The only exception to the digital system is a single cassette tape player that is used for select syndicate programs and legacy media.

== Live feed ==
The audio feed has been on and off the internet for the past 10 years due to web platform difficulties and lack of resources. In early 2014, the WOAS radio station completed implementation of its live internet audio stream. The audio stream broadcasts on the public internet in stereo at 128 KBps. As of March 2016, the main server has been replaced and it is now feeding the weather station on line (also to Weather Underground), video and audio.

== History ==
The first broadcast of WOAS started at 8:00 a.m. on Friday, December 15, 1978. The station was managed by the Ontonagon Area High School librarian, Thomas Graham Lee. At the time, the station featured two reel-to-reel players and a turntable as well as wiring for remote broadcasting in the cafeteria and gymnasium of the high school building.

Margaret Muskatt succeeded Thomas Lee as manager in 1985 and, in the years that followed, the appeal of the station began to dwindle due to under-funding and aging equipment (which was donated to begin with); this led to a lull in staff morale. In 1987, the Community Schools program took over daily operations under the leadership of Community School Director Mike Bennett. What followed was a decade of growth and operating income for the station and school district as many grants for programs and new equipment were secured.

Through the mid-1990s, the popularity of WOAS again bottomed out as the Community Schools budget took massive hits and their involvement in the radio station eventually folded. The Ontonagon Area School District continued to be the station's owner but operations continued with a skeleton crew of volunteers when the Community Schools program ceased to exist in 1994. In 1995, Bennett became the elementary school principal, which left the station without an acting manager. In 1997, the station hit its lowest point when a license renewal lapse was about to occur and the Ontonagon Area School District directors debated about whether or not to renew the station's FCC license.

Also in 1997, science teachers Ken Raisanen and Chuck Zelinski made a pitch to the school district superintendent John Peterson to take over station operations and save the nearly dead project. They renewed the broadcasting license and began refurbishing the station's infrastructure and equipment. With generous grants from the Ontonagon Area School District (OASD), the Upper Peninsula Power Company (UPPCO), community members and volunteers, the station underwent a major remodeling and equipment replacement. The station has encountered some difficulty with a stable web platform, but has managed to keep the station's audio stream intact at www.woas-fm.org. Assistance from REMC 1 has put the WOAS web presence on a stable footing after the initial server was not able to handle the multiple feeds and was replaced by a more capable unit.

Ken Raisanen assumed the Station Manager position in 1997 and he continues as the Station Manager today. Beginning in the 2013–14 school year, students from the Senior Service Project (SSP) class have developed their own daily program. The SSP classes developed the first talk format shows and pioneered the 'multiple DJ' format in several time slots. Beginning in the 2015–16 school year, nearly half of the day shift time slots are filled by SSP students.

== Community Outreach ==
The WOAS radio station is well known in the school and local community as having served as a catalyst for students to develop their communication skills and provide introductions into the broadcasting industry. Several students have used skills learned through the station to further develop their professional and personal careers.

Since 2015, student disc jockeys routinely create public service announcement (PSA) content in collaboration with multiple initiatives. Most notably campaigns include "Strive for a Safer Drive (S4SD)" through the State of Michigan Office of Highway Safety Planning. The local campaign is called 'Don't Be Distracted' or 'DbD' for short. WOAS placed 5th for their content created during the 2016 campaign.

WOAS marked another milestone in 2015-16 as one of the disc jockeys has featured a live, interactive broadcast with a fellow fan of the band Aviators each Friday via face to face computer networking from Germany.

The Ontonagon Herald local newspaper also features "From The Vaults" blog postings from the station.

== Frequency and Power Shift ==
In April 2023, the WOAS station manager was notified by The Gospel Opportunities Network (WHWL) that their request submitted to the FCC to take over local use of the 88.5-Mhz frequency was granted. As WOAS maintained a class-D license at the time, doing so was permitted by FCC code for class-A stations (a license which WHWL held) and WOAS was faced with either shifting frequencies or going off the air.

Public support for the station and its legacy was successful in raising enough funding to allow the station to upgrade its transmitter to a model capable of up to 100-watts and permit the station to apply for a class-A license with the FCC. Donations totaled in the range of $19,000.

The station will still be required to shift frequencies from its original 88.5-Mhz which it has held since first going on-air in 1978. The new frequency WOAS will broadcast at will be on 91.5 FM. On February 11, 2025, WOAS took the 88.5 FM signal off the air to prepare for a re-tuning of the transmitting antenna and equipment to work on 91.5 FM. The internet webcast of the station continued unimpacted. While clearing brush and overgrowth near the tower, it was observed that irreparable structural damage due to weathering had occurred to the base of the tower, and had to be dismantled. An additional fundraiser during the summer raised nearly $2,000 to go towards construction of a new tower. After plans were made regarding the scale and footprint of a new or used tower, Range Communications of Marquette has secured a used dismantled 100 foot guyed steel tower that they are willing to donate to the station. Plans will be discussed at an upcoming September School board meeting that will decide if construction on the station will be given the approval to go ahead or not.
