= KDHS-LP =

Radio station in Delta Junction, Alaska

- Delta Junction, Alaska; United States
- Frequency: 95.5 MHz
- Branding: "KDHS.fm"

Programming
- Format: Variety

Ownership
- Owner: Delta/Greely School District

History
- First air date: 2002
- Call sign meaning: Delta High School

Technical information
- Licensing authority: FCC
- Facility ID: 124904
- Class: LP1
- ERP: 100 watts
- HAAT: 23 meters (75 feet)
- Transmitter coordinates: 64°02′34″N 145°42′37″W

Links
- Public license information: LMS
- Website: https://sites.google.com/dgsd.us/kdhs

KDHS-LP (95.5 FM) is a high school radio station licensed to serve Delta Junction, Alaska. The station is owned by the Delta/Greely School District and operated by the staff and students of Delta High School. It airs a Variety format.

The station was assigned the KDHS-LP call letters by the Federal Communications Commission on June 27, 2002. The station began test broadcasts in September 2002 at the start of the 2002–2003 academic year. Live broadcasting continued through the fall of 2002 as computer problems prevented 24/7 service through use of the station's automation system. By early 2003, all the technical issues had been resolved and KDHS-LP began full-time service to the Delta Junction area with coverage of "community events and other civic happenings."
