= WWEB =

- Wallingford, Connecticut; United States
- Broadcast area: New Haven, Connecticut
- Frequency: 89.9 MHz

Ownership
- Owner: Choate Rosemary Hall Foundation

History
- First air date: September 1968
- Last air date: April 4, 2022
- Call sign meaning: Wallingford Educational Broadcasting

Technical information
- Facility ID: 10861
- Class: D
- ERP: 15 watts
- HAAT: −5.0 meters (−16.4 ft)
- Transmitter coordinates: 41°27′34″N 72°48′48″W

WWEB (89.9 FM) was a noncommercial educational radio station licensed to Wallingford, Connecticut, United States, that operated from 1968 to 2022 and served parts of the New Haven area. Last owned by Choate Rosemary Hall Foundation, it carried a high school radio and variety format. WWEB featured student and faculty programs supplemented with the programming of WWUH from the University of Hartford.

== History ==
WWEB's initial construction permit was applied for on November 20, 1965, and granted on November 10, 1966. The station was granted the callsign WWEB on February 14, 1967, and its license to cover was granted on April 10, 1968. In the early days, the station was on the third floor north attic of the building called the Science building (now Humanities). They used a Bauer 5-pot slide board. The transmitter was on a cabinet right behind the turntables, made by Granger. The transmitter fed a 7/8” line up to the roof where a 2-bay horizontal V only antenna was mounted on a pole or small tower section.

WWEB was one of the first National Public Radio distribution stations, in 1971, when it operated as a Class D educational station with a maximum Transmitter Power Output (TPO) of 10 watts, featuring weekly broadcasts of "Washington Week in Review" and "Firing Line" predating the later PBS television versions.

Its license was cancelled on April 4, 2022, for failing to file a renewal application.
