= WAES (FM) =

Radio station at Adlai E. Stevenson High School in Lincolnshire, Illinois

Lincolnshire, Illinois; United States
- Frequency: 88.1 MHz

Programming
- Format: Defunct (formerly high school radio)

Ownership
- Owner: Adlai E. Stevenson High School District 125

History
- Last air date: December 1, 2020
- Call sign meaning: Adlai E. Stevenson

Technical information
- Facility ID: 76042
- Class: A
- ERP: 150 watts
- HAAT: 15 meters (49 ft)
- Transmitter coordinates: 42°11′59.00″N 87°56′49.00″W

WAES (88.1 FM) was a high school radio station licensed to Lincolnshire, Illinois, United States. It was branded "Stevenson Patriot Radio," a name reflective of both the school's name and mascot. It was owned and operated by Adlai E. Stevenson High School and was run by students of the high school. Its license expired December 1, 2020.
