= WHSD =

High school radio station in Hinsdale, Illinois

- Hinsdale, Illinois; United States
- Frequency: 88.5 MHz

Programming
- Format: High school

Ownership
- Owner: Hinsdale Township High School District #86

History
- Call sign meaning: From "Hinsdale"

Technical information
- Licensing authority: FCC
- Facility ID: 27263
- Class: A
- ERP: 125 watts (horizontal); 80 watts (vertical)
- HAAT: 40 meters (130 ft)
- Transmitter coordinates: 41°47′18″N 87°56′02″W

Links
- Public license information: Public file; LMS
- Webcast: For Central days only
- Website: www.hcdevilsadvocate.com/ae/2011/10/04/central-students-are-on-air-starting-this-week/

WHSD (88.5 FM) is an American non-commercial educational radio station licensed to serve the community of Hinsdale, Illinois. The station's broadcast license is held by Hinsdale Township High School District #86. The station was assigned the call sign "WHSD" by the Federal Communications Commission.

WHSD broadcasts a high school radio format serving Hinsdale Central High School and Hinsdale South High School. Sunday through early Wednesday are run as "Hinsdale South Radio" and late Wednesday through Saturday as "Hinsdale Central Radio".
