= WRSG =

- Middlebourne, West Virginia; United States
- Broadcast area: Tyler County, West Virginia
- Frequency: 91.5 kHz
- Branding: Knights Radio 91.5

Programming
- Format: Variety

Ownership
- Owner: Tyler Consolidated High School; (Tyler County Board of Education)

History
- First air date: May 21, 2001
- Call sign meaning: Ruth Stealey Green Foundation

Technical information
- Licensing authority: FCC
- Facility ID: 94051
- Class: A
- ERP: 900 watts
- HAAT: 48 meters (158 feet)
- Transmitter coordinates: 39°30′59″N 80°54′00″W

Links
- Public license information: Public file; LMS
- Webcast: WRSG Webstream

WRSG (91.5 FM) is a non-commercial high school radio station licensed to serve Middlebourne, West Virginia. The station is owned by Tyler Consolidated High School and licensed to the Tyler County Board of Education. It airs a Variety format.

The station was assigned the callsign WRSG by the Federal Communications Commission on July 3, 2000.

The station began carrying the syndicated Pink Floyd program Floydian Slip with Craig Bailey on April 10, 2011.
