= CISD-FM =

Former radio station in Iroquois, Ontario

Defunct
- Iroquois, Ontario; Canada
- Frequency: 107.7 MHz (FM)

Programming
- Format: Community radio

Ownership
- Owner: Seaway Campus Community Radio Station

History
- First air date: October 2, 1999
- Last air date: October 30, 2003

CISD-FM was a community radio station in Iroquois, Ontario, Canada. The station was operated by Seaway Campus Community Radio Ltd., a division of the region's Seaway District High School.

== History ==
On December 2, 1998, the Canadian Radio-television and Telecommunications Commission (CRTC) approved Seaway Campus Community Radio Station's application to operate a new FM station at Iroquois on the frequency of 107.7 MHz, channel 299LP, with an effective radiated power of 50 watts. The station began on-air testing in the summer of 1999 until the station officially signed on the air on October 2, 1999.

CISD-FM known as The Storm 107.7 FM ceased operations on October 30, 2003.
