= WZZE =

Radio station in Glen Mills, Pennsylvania (1975–2014)

- Glen Mills, Pennsylvania; United States
- Broadcast area: Philadelphia metropolitan area
- Frequency: 97.3 MHz

Ownership
- Owner: Glen Mills Schools

History
- First air date: 1975
- Last air date: June 28, 2019

Technical information
- Facility ID: 24259
- Class: D
- ERP: 18 watts
- HAAT: 56 meters (184 ft)
- Transmitter coordinates: 39°55′15.3″N 75°29′56.7″W

WZZE (97.3 FM) was a non-commercial radio station licensed to Glen Mills, Pennsylvania, United States. Owned and operated by the Glen Mills Schools, it last broadcast a contemporary hit radio format with a transmitter located in Glen Mills.

The station ceased broadcasting in 2014 but did not inform the Federal Communications Commission of this until June 28, 2019, at which point its license was canceled on July 2, 2019.
