= KNHS-LP =

Radio station in Lafayette, Louisiana

Lafayette, Louisiana; United States
- Frequency: 93.1 MHz
- Branding: 93.1 The Viking

Programming
- Format: High school radio

Ownership
- Owner: Lafayette Parish School System

History
- First air date: August 27, 2015
- Call sign meaning: Northside High School

Technical information
- Licensing authority: FCC
- Facility ID: 196007
- Class: L1
- ERP: 29 watts
- HAAT: 54.33 m
- Transmitter coordinates: 30°13′6″N 92°2′19″W

Links
- Public license information: LMS
- Website: KNHS-LP on Facebook

KNHS-LP (93.1 FM) is an American low-power FM radio station broadcasting to the Lafayette, Louisiana, area. The station is based at Northside High School.

== History ==
On November 15, 2013, the Lafayette Parish School System applied to the Federal Communications Commission to build a new low-power FM radio station in Lafayette. The station was approved in February 2015 and immediately began broadcasting online. On August 27, KNHS-LP began transmitting. It aired a variety of student-produced programming during the day and jazz music overnight. Most music programming is centered around Cajun/zydeco music, pop, or jazz.
