= WCWT-FM =

Centerville, Ohio; United States
- Broadcast area: Centerville-Washington Township (CWT)
- Frequency: 107.3 MHz
- Branding: 107.3 The Voice of the Elks

Programming
- Format: Top 40 / We Play Everything

Ownership
- Owner: Centerville City Schools Board of Education; (Centerville High School)

History
- Call sign meaning: Centerville-Washington Township

Technical information
- Licensing authority: FCC
- Facility ID: 9780
- Class: D
- ERP: 23 watts
- HAAT: 58.0 meters
- Transmitter coordinates: 39°37′38.00″N 84°8′54.00″W

Links
- Public license information: Public file; LMS
- Webcast: WCWT Stream
- Website: WCWT Website

WCWT-FM (107.3 FM) is a non-commercial low-power non-commercial educational FM high school radio station licensed to Centerville, Ohio, United States. WCWT-FM was the brainchild of founders Ken Carper and Roy Grimes, the station started operations in the third-floor restroom of what is now Magsig Middle School. When the high school moved to its current location (Centerville High School) in 1975, new studios and a classroom were built in the West Unit where the station continues to operate today. The station is currently owned by Centerville City Board of Education. 2011 was the radio station's 40th anniversary. The station celebrated their 50th anniversary in 2021, which was recognized with a reunion dinner, calling alumni from throughout all of WCWT's history, at Centerville High School on November 4, 2022.
