= WBSL-FM =

- Sheffield, Massachusetts; United States
- Frequency: 91.7 MHz

Programming
- Format: Variety

Ownership
- Owner: Berkshire School; (The Berkshire School, Inc.)

History
- Call sign meaning: Berkshire School

Technical information
- Licensing authority: FCC
- Facility ID: 65455
- Class: A
- ERP: 230 watts
- HAAT: −23.0 meters (−75.5 ft)
- Transmitter coordinates: 42°6′57.3″N 73°24′58.4″W

Links
- Public license information: Public file; LMS
- Webcast: Listen live
- Website: www.berkshireschool.org/page.cfm?p=427

WBSL-FM (91.7 FM) is a high school radio station broadcasting a variety music format. Licensed to Sheffield, Massachusetts, United States. The station is owned by The Berkshire School, Inc.

WBSL, founded in 1973 by Berkshire School faculty member Tom Dixon, is on the air weekdays from 7 to 8:00 a.m. and weekday and Sunday evenings from 7:00 to 11:00 when school is in session. During those times when students and faculty are not on the air, WBSL transmits the signal of National Public Radio affiliate WHDD-FM in nearby Sharon, Connecticut, giving WBSL 24-hour airtime. Programs simulcast from WHDD include All Things Considered and the BBC World Service, as well as local coverage.

Notable broadcasters who began their career at WBSL include longtime San Francisco jazz programmer and morning host Roger Coryell.
