= CKVI-FM =

Radio station in Kingston, Ontario

Coordinates: 44°13′45″N 76°29′51″W

- Kingston, Ontario; Canada
- Frequency: 91.9 MHz
- Branding: The Cave

Programming
- Format: High school educational radio

Ownership
- Owner: KCVI Educational Radio Station Inc.

History
- First air date: 1997
- Call sign meaning: Kingston Collegiate and Vocational Institute

Technical information
- Class: LP
- ERP: 6.5 watts
- HAAT: 34.5 metres (113 ft)

Links
- Website: thecave.ca

CKVI-FM is a Canadian community radio station, owned and operated by Kingston Collegiate and Vocational Institute in Kingston, Ontario. The station broadcasts at 91.9 on the FM dial, and uses the on-air brand The Cave. CKVI was the first high school radio station to be granted a broadcasting license by the CRTC.

CKVI now broadcasts up to 52 hours a week. Its programming includes multiple styles, cultures, and genres of music.

== History ==
Initially licensed by the CRTC in 1996, it was the first licensed high school radio station in Canada. The station didn't go on air until the 1997–1998 school year because the station is run by high school students and had to wait until the start of the following year.

The station is run by students who are part of the Radio Broadcasting county-wide focus program which is open to any Grade 11, 12, and returning 12th year students in the Limestone District School Board.

On November 28, 2016, KCVI Educational Radio Station Incorporated (KCVI) applied to operate the station as a regular-powered radio station. The CRTC approved KCVI's application on May 5, 2017.

On April 5, 2022, the CRTC approved KCVI's application to increase CKVI's effective radiated power (ERP) from 7 to 30 watts, and decrease the effective height of the antenna above average terrain (HAAT) from 34.5 to 33 metres.

On July 16, 2026, KCVI Educational Radio Station Incorporated (KCVI) received CRTC approval to increase CKVI-FM's effective radiated power (ERP) from 30 to 1,772 watts, to replace the transmitter to accommodate the proposed increase in ERP, and to decrease the effective height of the antenna above average terrain (EHAAT) from 33.5 to 30.1 metres. All other technical parameters will remain unchanged. The station would convert its low-power non-protected station into a regular power, protected Class A station.
