= KASB =

Coordinates: 47.6045°N 122.1976°W

- Bellevue, Washington; United States
- Broadcast area: Seattle metropolitan area
- Frequency: 89.9 MHz FM

Programming
- Format: Freeform

Ownership
- Owner: Bellevue School District #405

Technical information
- Licensing authority: FCC
- Facility ID: 4631
- Class: D
- ERP: 60 watts
- HAAT: 10 meters

Links
- Public license information: Public file; LMS
- Website: www.kasbfm.com

KASB (89.9 FM) is a high school radio station broadcasting a Freeform radio format and provides high school student oriented music and news. Licensed to Bellevue, Washington, United States, it serves the Bellevue area. The station is currently owned by Bellevue School District #405.
