= KBPS (AM) =

Radio station in Portland, Oregon

- Portland, Oregon; United States
- Broadcast area: Portland metropolitan area
- Frequency: 1450 kHz C-QUAM AM stereo
- Branding: AM 1450 KBPS

Programming
- Language: English
- Format: Daytime (school days): Top 40, hot adult contemporary, contemporary hit radio; Nights/Weekends, Non-school days: oldies, adult standards, classic rock, holiday music (November–December), jam band (Specialty Programming)

Ownership
- Owner: Portland Public Schools; (School District No. 1, Multnomah County, Oregon)

History
- First air date: March 23, 1923
- Former call signs: KFIF (1923–1930)
- Call sign meaning: Benson Polytechnic School

Technical information
- Licensing authority: FCC
- Facility ID: 4782
- Class: C
- Power: 1,000 watts
- Transmitter coordinates: 45°31′38″N 122°39′3″W

Links
- Public license information: Public file; LMS
- Webcast: Listen live
- Website: kbps.am

KBPS (1450 kHz) is an AM high school radio station in Portland, Oregon, owned by Portland Public Schools, and run by Benson Polytechnic High School students enrolled in its radio broadcasting program. From its founding the station has been based on the Benson campus and staffed by its students.

As part of its standard transmission, KBPS broadcasts in AM stereo.

== History ==
In May 1921, the Benson Polytechnic School received a government license to operate a "Technical and Training School" station with the call sign 7YK. This station used a spark transmitter, which was limited to Morse code dot-and-dash transmissions. In the early 1920s, broadcasting was introduced, and arrangements were made to establish a school station. Equipment previously used by a short-lived station, KYG, was purchased by the student body in March 1923, and an application filed for a new broadcasting station to be operated by the students under the direction of teacher Fred Brainard.

The first broadcasting station license, with the call sign KFIF, was issued on March 23, to the Benson Polytechnic Institute. Equipment tests were begun in April, followed by an informal debut broadcast at 6 pm on May 4. A more formal station introduction, coinciding with the start of the fifth annual Benson Technical Show, was broadcast from 9:30 to 10:30 pm on May 9, with scheduled addresses by school director W. F. Woodward, Benson principal C. E. Cleveland, and student body president Bill Norvell, plus singing by Marguerite Carney.

KFIF's initial assignment was for broadcasting on a wavelength of 360 meters (833 kHz), a shared "entertainment" wavelength that required allocating timeslots to individual stations in order to avoid interference. In late 1924, KFIF was reassigned to 1210 kHz, which was followed by assignments to 1400 kHz in 1927, and to 1310 kHz in early 1928. On November 11, under the provision of the Federal Radio Commission's General Order 40, KFIF moved to a "local" frequency of 1420 kHz.

The school's original application requested reassignment of the KYG call letters, however the station was instead randomly assigned KFIF from an alphabetical roster of available call signs. In March 1930, the call sign was changed to KBPS (for Benson Polytechnic School), with the station's William Allingham explaining that "the letters KFIF were difficult to utter over the radio... and they were harder still to understand".

During the 1933-1934 school year, programming was added intended for local elementary school students. KBPS was transferred from the school to the School District in the fall of 1939. As of 1942, KBPS was on the air every school day from 11 am to 1 pm and from 3:15 to 5 pm. Several of the city schools had radio production instruction, and would prepare special broadcasts for the station.

In March 1941, with the implementation of the North American Regional Broadcasting Agreement, most of the stations on 1420 kHz, including KBPS, moved as a group to 1450 kHz. In 1929, KBPS had begun timesharing with another Portland station, KXL. After KXL moved to 750 kHz in October 1941, KBPS had unlimited broadcasting hours, but because it did not have enough programming to fill the available time, it was licensed with a reduced schedule as a "specified hours" station.

As of 1947, the station was broadcasting six hours each day. Patricia Green Swenson took over as general manager at this point, a post which she held until 1994. In early 1950, an offer to be given the FM transmitter previously used by the recently shuttered KGW-FM was turned down, because "too much expense would be involved in conversion of present AM receivers in the schools". By 1954, the station's schedule was 9 am to 9 pm. Monday to Friday, which was sometimes extended for late running sports events.

Beginning in 1994, a student group at Portland State University began leasing time on the station, to provide college radio-style programming over KBPS for 59 hours each week, from 5 pm until midnight on weekdays and noon to midnight on weekends. The contract arrangement was terminated on June 25, 2010, a week before its intended conclusion, due to KBPS management concerns that some of the programming was inappropriate for a high school station.

On July 1, 2012, KBPS suspended operations for the summer due to budget cuts, but returned to the air later that year.
