= WOSS =

Ossining, New York; United States
- Frequency: 91.1 MHz

Programming
- Format: Defunct (was variety)

Ownership
- Owner: Ossining Union Free School District; (Union Free School District # 1)

History
- First air date: 1972
- Last air date: June 2, 2022
- Call sign meaning: "Ossining"

Technical information
- Licensing authority: FCC
- Facility ID: 68811
- Class: D
- ERP: 15 watts
- HAAT: 21.0 meters (68.9 ft)
- Transmitter coordinates: 41°09′36″N 73°51′38″W

Links
- Public license information: Public file; LMS

WOSS (91.1 FM) was a radio station broadcasting a variety format. Licensed to Ossining, New York, United States, the station was last owned by the Ossining Union Free School District. Its license was cancelled on June 2, 2022, due to failing to file a license renewal application.
