= WBXL =

- Baldwinsville, New York; United States
- Broadcast area: Syracuse area
- Frequency: 90.5 MHz
- Branding: 90.5 The Buzz

Programming
- Format: Variety

Ownership
- Owner: Baldwinsville Central School District

Technical information
- Facility ID: 3639
- Class: A
- ERP: 175 watts
- HAAT: 63.0 meters
- Transmitter coordinates: 43°9′47.00″N 76°18′47.00″W

WBXL is a high school radio station located in Baldwinsville, New York. WBXL has been broadcasting since late 1975. Most of the student DJs shows occurred during the school day or in evenings before 11pm. Later on, the station started broadcasting 24/7 (since October 2012).

WBXL can be heard by listeners in the Syracuse, New York area. The station is housed inside Charles W. Baker High School in Baldwinsville and is student-operated.

WBXL was started by Al Jenner, a former teacher at Baker High and Mark Humphrey, a student. The station acquired its first transmitter from the Fayetteville-Manlius School District, after acquiring it from WAER-FM, Syracuse University. The transmitter was a low power unit (10–100 watts). Over the years the station grew and became an integral part of the school culture. Eventually, a class was created around the radio station. The class was centered on teaching students effective communication techniques as well as broadcasting history and the intricacies of radio broadcasting.

WBXL has a student administration consisting of: General Manager, Music Director, Mix Team, and Talk Show Hosts.

WBXL plays a large variety of musical genres and decades. Primarily from the 1970s, 1980s and 1990s and any style from jazz to metal. The station is on air 24 hours a day, everyday.
