= WBVC (FM) =

- Pomfret, Connecticut; United States
- Broadcast area: Quiet Corner
- Frequency: 91.1 MHz
- Branding: Eclectic Student Radio

Programming
- Format: Variety

Ownership
- Owner: Pomfret School

History
- First air date: 2001; 25 years ago
- Last air date: April 28, 2022; 4 years ago
- Call sign meaning: Bill and Virginia Cargill

Technical information
- Licensing authority: FCC
- Facility ID: 91189
- Class: A
- ERP: 100 watts
- HAAT: 88.0 meters (288.7 ft)
- Transmitter coordinates: 41°53′27″N 71°57′24″W

Links
- Public license information: Public file; LMS

WBVC was a freeform high school radio station located in Pomfret, Connecticut. Directly affiliated with Pomfret School, the station was funded through a gift from Bill and Virginia Cargill, whose initials, BVC, formed the station's call letters.

WBVC signed on in 2001. The station's license was surrendered to the Federal Communications Commission on April 28, 2022, and cancelled September 19, 2022.

The website and live stream were shut down by July 2026.
