= WAJM =

Coordinates: 39.365°N 74.475°W

WAJM-FM
Atlantic City, New Jersey; United States
- Broadcast area: Southern New Jersey
- Frequency: 88.9 MHz

Programming
- Format: Educational / Freeform

Ownership
- Owner: Atlantic City Board of Education

Technical information
- Licensing authority: FCC
- Class: A
- ERP: 150 watts
- HAAT: 31 meters

Links
- Public license information: Public file; LMS
- Website: Jammin' 88.9

WAJM, assigned to 88.9 FM and licensed to Atlantic City, New Jersey, is a high school radio station owned by the Atlantic City Board of Education and is operated by the students of Atlantic City High School. Currently, WAJM broadcasts live Monday thru Friday from 7:00am to 3:30pm and during after hours, on weekends, holidays and when Atlantic City High School is closed due to inclement weather the station operates on an automated system where music, station IDs and PSA are shuffled and broadcast on-air. Starting at its inception WAJM had been broadcasting with a jazz radio format until 2009 when it flipped to a freeform radio format using the moniker 88.9 The Jam. The studios, offices and transmitter are located on the campus of Atlantic City High School on North Albany Avenue in Atlantic City. In 2009 WAJM began simulcasting its live and automated broadcasts via the Internet in both an audio only feed and audio/video feed. The station was a creation of Mr.Norman Draper. The first school year of on air broadcasting was 1996–97. That year the students interviewed "Sugar" Ray Leonard, and did a live simulcast from the grand opening of the new Atlantic City Convention Center.

In 2005 the Atlantic City Board of Education entered into an agreement with In His Name Broadcasting which at the time owned 88.7 FM WXXY (Now WEHA) licensed to neighboring Port Republic to simulcast each other programming, WAJM would simulcast WXXY's religious programming when their live programming ended for the day and WXXY would broadcast Atlantic City Board of Education meetings and Atlantic City Public School sporting events, specifically the Atlantic City High School Vikings.
