= WLTL =

Radio station at Lyons Township High School in LaGrange, Illinois

- La Grange, Illinois; United States
- Broadcast area: Chicago
- Frequency: 88.1 MHz
- Branding: 88.1 FM LaGrange

Programming
- Format: Variety/rock
- Affiliations: None

Ownership
- Owner: Lyons Township High School
- Sister stations: LT-TV

History
- First air date: 1968
- Call sign meaning: Lyons Township, LaGrange

Technical information
- Licensing authority: FCC
- Facility ID: 39369
- Class: A
- ERP: 180 watts
- HAAT: 42 meters (138 ft)
- Transmitter coordinates: 41°48′38″N 87°52′47″W

Links
- Public license information: Public file; LMS
- Webcast: WLTL Stream
- Website: WLTL Online

WLTL Radio ("WLTL-FM"), is a nonprofit high school educational radio station located in LaGrange, Illinois, and run out of Lyons Township High School. WLTL has won several national and local awards.

== WLTL Background ==
WLTL launched in January 1968 as a 10 watt radio station on the third floor of the Vaughan Building at LTHS' North Campus, with a simple omnidirectional antenna. WLTL originally operated on an assigned frequency of 88.3 MHz, but by 1969 changed frequency to 88.1 to permit WHSD, Hinsdale to operate on 88.5 and avoid having the two relatively close stations operate on adjacent channels. While licensed to operate at 10 watts, with a transmitter capable only of 10 watts power output, and a single bay horizontally polarized antenna with inexpensive transmission line, it was estimated that the actual ERP of the station at that time was approximately 7 watts. The original studio furniture was donated by local La Grange station WTAQ. The station transmitted a monophonic signal until the mid-1980s.

After a license upgrade in the mid-1980s to permit higher power utilizing a new, higher, circularly polarized directional antenna, WLTL now broadcasts at 180 watts, with the transmitter and antenna still at the original location, though with a newer taller tower. The directional pattern places the strongest signal to the south and south-east, while maintaining a null in the direction of WETN, Wheaton College, also operating on 88.1, and to a lesser extent, limiting the signal somewhat to the west to protect WDGC at 88.3 (first adjacent) and WHSD on 88.5 (second adjacent). The power increase also made stereophonic transmission practical. WLTL also moved its studios into Room 10 of the North Campus main building, then later, into its current studios in Room 9.

During its early years, WLTL was entirely student run with only minimal faculty supervision. The station operated with limited broadcast hours, initially from 3pm to 6pm Monday to Thursday, and 3pm to 9pm on Friday and Saturday, later expanding to Noon to 7 Monday - Thursday, and Noon to 10pm Friday and Saturday. Early programming consisted of short student-produced recorded educational programs, educational programming supplied by several college stations, and student DJ programs featuring popular music. Student DJ programs dominated the evening and weekend hours, and many students strived to emulate local professional broadcasters both in style and content. There were even student-produced radio dramas featuring original scripts and sound effects. To commemorate the 80th Anniversary of Lyons Township High School in 1968, the student staff of WLTL produced a commemorative record presenting audio highlights of key events at the school. The record was a 33 rpm 10-inch disc titled "We Are L.T.", and was sold to students, alumni and faculty.

With encouragement from the staff at commercial station WTAQ La Grange (who also donated some older remote broadcast equipment), the station became involved with high-school sports broadcasting, and covered LTHS's winning of the Illinois State High School Basketball Championship in 1970, broadcasting live from Champaign, IL. Other early innovations included developing relationships with other area high school radio stations, who would on occasion exchange DJs to share in each other's radio experience. A relationship was also formed with WIND Chicago (Group W, Westinghouse Broadcasting) in order to supply news content to WLTL.

WLTL is licensed to the board of trustees-School District 204 and is operated by students of LTHS under the supervision of faculty advisers.

The music of WLTL is organized in a variety rock music radio format, airing various types of music including rock, alternative, pop, ska, emo, and others. The station operates 24 hours a day.

== Alumni ==
After graduation, alumni taking part in WLTL have moved on to various successful careers. Notable alumni include:

- Chris Thomas (General Manager at WLTL since 2005. President of the Intercollegiate Broadcasting System. Former Producer at ESPN Radio)
- Dave Juday (Radio instructor/faculty news and sports director at East Valley Institute of Technology in Arizona. Former sports anchor, ESPN Radio 1000, WMVP Chicago)
- Ryan Arnold (Former DJ at 93XRT])
- Emma Mac (DJ at 93XRT)
- Sean Leidigh (executive producer, WGN TV News)
- Phil Lebeau (Automotive and Airline Industry reporter at CNBC)
- Tyler Moody (Director of Digital Media, Radio - Cox Media Group; former vice president at CNN Radio)
- Andy Alcock (investigative reporter at KHSB-TV, Kansas City)
- Tucker Maloney (Television and film producer)
- Jim Toth (filmmaker)
- Tim Rozner (Concert and Music Producer)

== Images ==
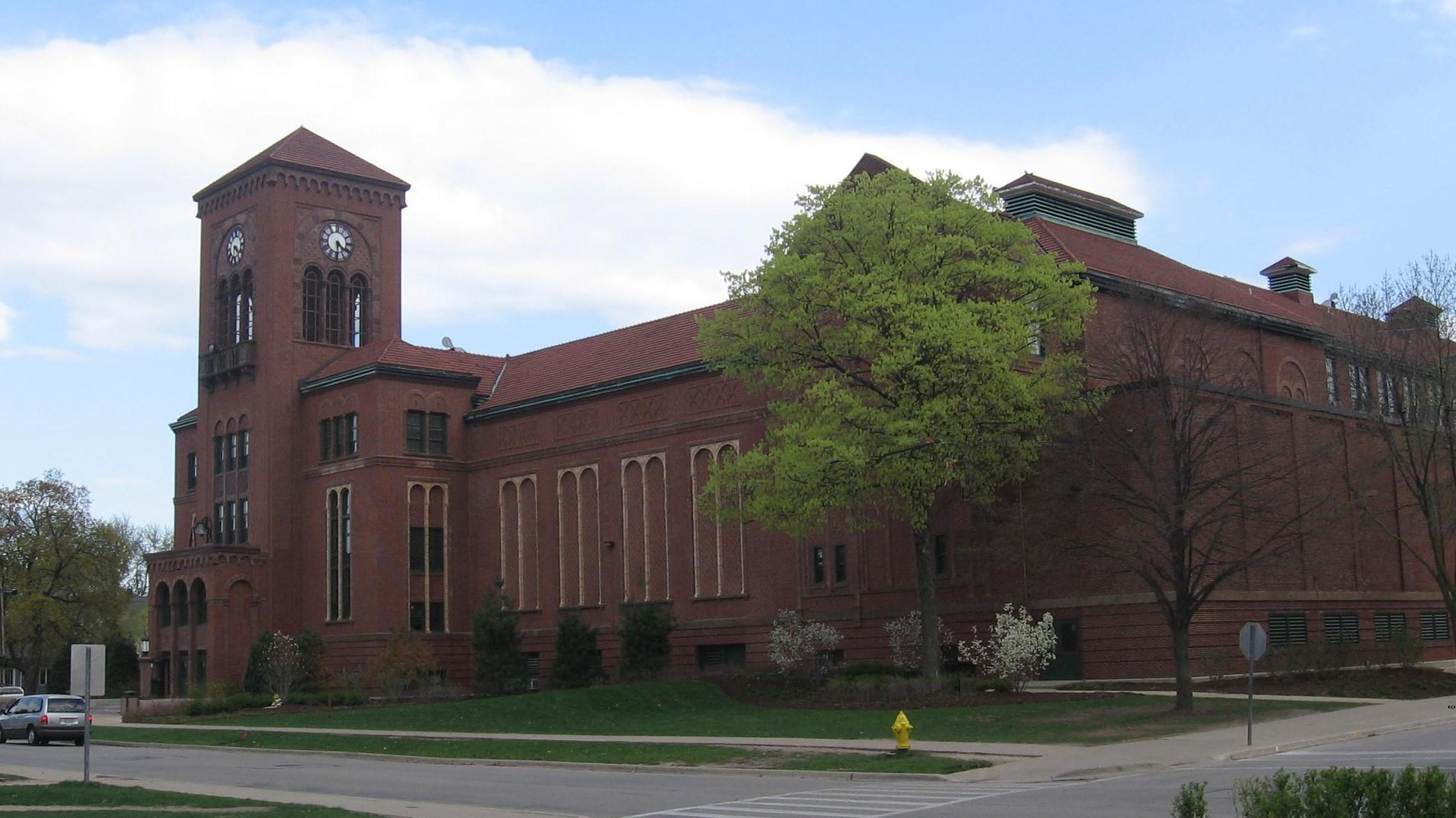
Lyons Township High School North Campus

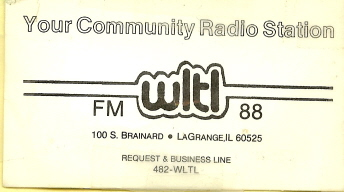
WLTL business card, circa 1987

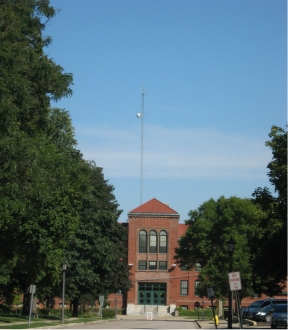
WLTL transmitter, 2010
