= KBPK =

Radio station in Buena Park, California

- Buena Park, California; United States
- Broadcast area: North Orange County, California
- Frequency: 90.1 MHz

Ownership
- Owner: Buena Park School District
- Operator: Fullerton College

History
- First air date: July 6, 1970
- Last air date: August 9, 2023
- Call sign meaning: Buena Park

Technical information
- Facility ID: 7742
- Class: D
- ERP: 19 watts
- HAAT: 3 meters (9.8 ft)
- Transmitter coordinates: 33°51′35″N 118°0′53″W

KBPK (90.1 FM) was a non-commercial radio station licensed to Buena Park, California, United States, that operated from 1970 to 2023. The station was owned by the Buena Park School District and operated by the Fullerton College Media Studies Department, the campus on which the KBPK studios were located. The station primarily broadcast an adult contemporary music format as well as various public service programs and special announcements.

== History ==
KBPK first signed on on July 6, 1970, by the Buena Park School District.

In May 1995, KBPK aired Cal State Fullerton Titans baseball games while the team competed in the NCAA postseason tournament.

KBPK broadcast games of the Fullerton Flyers, an independent professional baseball club, during the 2006 Golden Baseball League season.

On August 7, 2023, the Buena Park School District informed the Federal Communications Commission (FCC) that KBPK would shut down on August 9, and surrendered the station's license for cancellation. The FCC cancelled the station's license on August 10, 2023.

== See also ==
- List of community radio stations in the United States
