= WFHS-LP =

Radio station at Fern Creek High School in Louisville, Kentucky

- Fern Creek (Louisville); United States
- Broadcast area: Fern Creek Neighborhood
- Frequency: 92.7 MHz
- Branding: 92.7 The Tiger

Programming
- Format: Defunct (formerly High school radio)

Ownership
- Owner: Fern Creek Traditional High School Alumni Association, Inc.

History
- First air date: 2006
- Last air date: 2023
- Call sign meaning: Fern Creek High School

Technical information
- Licensing authority: FCC
- Facility ID: 135516
- Class: L1
- ERP: 29 watts
- HAAT: 54.4 meters
- Transmitter coordinates: 38°9′22.00″N 85°35′34.00″W

Links
- Public license information: LMS
- Website: www.927thetiger.com

WFHS-LP (92.7 The Tiger FM) was a radio station licensed to broadcast from Louisville, Kentucky's Fern Creek neighborhood. The station was owned by Fern Creek Traditional High School Alumni Association, Inc. The station was a student-run radio station that played all genres of music such as rock and country and broadcast Fern Creek High School's football and basketball games.

On September 27, 2023, the station's licensee surrendered WFHS-LP's license to the Federal Communications Commission, who cancelled it the same day.
