= WBLD =

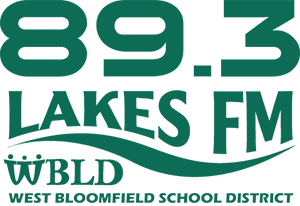

Orchard Lake, Michigan; United States
- Broadcast area: West Bloomfield, Michigan
- Frequency: 89.3 MHz
- Branding: 89.3 WBLD Lakes FM

Programming
- Format: Top 40; High school radio

Ownership
- Owner: West Bloomfield School District

History
- First air date: May 28, 1974; 51 years ago
- Call sign meaning: "West Bloomfield"

Technical information
- Licensing authority: FCC
- Facility ID: 71544
- Class: D
- ERP: 44 watts
- HAAT: 43.1 m (141 ft)
- Transmitter coordinates: 42°34′11.1″N 83°21′39.7″W

Links
- Public license information: Public file; LMS
- Webcast: TuneIn
- Website: Lakes FM

WBLD (89.3 FM), branded on-air as Lakes FM, is a high school radio station licensed to Orchard Lake, Michigan, United States, broadcasting a Top 40 format. Owned by the West Bloomfield School District, it first began broadcasting in 1974.

In the fall of 2014, WBLD operations were moved from West Bloomfield High School to the Green Media Center on the Sheiko Elementary School site. In December 2014, WBLD was rebranded as "Lakes FM". Lakes FM now plays Top 40 Hits with a mix of older songs. This launched the "Old School, New School, From Your School" Slogan. In April, the FCC granted WBLD more power and to relocate the antenna from West Bloomfield High School to West Bloomfield Fire Tower #1, which is just north on Orchard Lake Road. In the fall, Lakes FM broadcasts all WBHS varsity football and most basketball games.
