= KNHS (California) =

- Torrance, California; United States
- Frequency: 89.7 MHz

Programming
- Format: Defunct (was high school radio)

Ownership
- Owner: Torrance Unified School District

History
- First air date: March 1966; 60 years ago
- Last air date: 1991
- Call sign meaning: "North High School"

Technical information
- Facility ID: 67342
- Class: D

KNHS (89.7 FM) was a high school radio station at North High School in Torrance, California, United States.

== History ==
On August 16, 1965, the Torrance Unified School District received a construction permit for a new non-commercial educational radio station to broadcast with 10 watts from the North High School campus. The antenna and technical facilities were completed that fall. Broadcasting began in March 1966, making North High the second high school in the United States with its own radio station; KNHS initially operated for just one hour a day. A closed-circuit station on campus had operated as early as 1957. Two years later, a closed-circuit campus TV station was started. By 1982, it was airing six hours a day on weekdays.

In later years, new disc jockeys were juniors who learned from the previous year's students and, as the school year progressed, shifted away mid-year from music to begin writing public service announcements and conducting on-air interviews. Although it was against school rules for students to carry radios on campus, some students managed to listen with transistor radios and later Walkmans, or on tape recordings the student broadcasters' parents made. At this time, the station had no working tape deck, nor did it have a CD player, so all music came from vinyl. The station went off air by 1991.
