= WBFH =

Coordinates: 42.578°N 83.286°W

- Bloomfield Hills, Michigan; United States
- Broadcast area: Detroit, Michigan
- Frequency: 88.1 MHz
- Branding: The Biff

Programming
- Format: Hit Music, Hot Topics, Sports/Talk, High school station

Ownership
- Owner: Bloomfield Hills School District

History
- First air date: October 1, 1976
- Call sign meaning: Bloomfield Hills

Technical information
- Licensing authority: FCC
- Class: A
- ERP: 360 watts
- HAAT: 55 meters

Links
- Public license information: Public file; LMS
- Website: http://www.wbfh.fm/

WBFH, also known as The Biff, is a community radio station that has operated out of Bloomfield Hills High School (formerly Andover High School and since 2013, also merged with Lahser High School) in Bloomfield Hills, Michigan since October 1, 1976. WBFH now has new studios in a highly visible area off the Commons and Main Street. The new studios have one on air room (Studio A), three production studios (Studios B, C and D), a work room and a storage room. WBFH broadcasts with 360 watts of power at 88.1 MHz on the FM dial. The signal is directional and can be heard throughout mid-Oakland County. For a period until October 16, 2016, the station was simulcast on 89.5 FM, WAHS, owned by the Avondale School District. The two stations have since resumed separate programming.

WBFH is licensed to the Bloomfield Hills School District and is open to all high school students. Students who want to be on the radio station must first take the prerequisite class entitled Exploring Electronic Media which is a one-semester class. After that, they can apply to be on the WBFH Staff. Due to time and space limitations, not all applicants are selected to be on the Staff. WBFH was run by General Manager/Electronic Media Teacher Pete Bowers who supervised the station and taught the electronic media/radio classes since its inception in 1976. Bowers retired in June, 2017. He was inducted into the Michigan Broadcasting Hall of Fame August 13, 2018. The other management team member is Manager/Technical Director/Program Director Ron Wittebols who took over that position in January, 2013 but has a long relationship with the station. WBFH is on the air with live shows from 9 a.m.-9 p.m. school calendar days and 24/7/365 via the DADPro 32 automation system. The students use Adobe Audition for audio editing. Listeners can listen to WBFH online on the station's website www.wbfh.fm, on the Biff Radio app, the High School Radio app and the TuneIn app. WBFH is one of only a few high school radio stations with their own app.

WBFH has been named the High School Station of the Year in the State of Michigan by the Michigan Association of Broadcasters Foundation ten times: 2003, 2004*, 2005, 2006, 2008, 2010, 2011*, 2013, 2015 and 2016.

== See also ==
- Media in Detroit
