= 96.7 FM =

FM radio frequency

The following radio stations broadcast on FM frequency 96.7 MHz:

== Argentina ==
- Armonía in San Juan, San Juan
- Cadena Espacio in Córdoba, Córdoba
- LRI731 Centenario in Capitán Bermúdez, Santa Fe
- Expedito in Joaquin V. González, Salta
- Fortaleza de Jesús in Ingeniero Juárez, Formosa
- Glaciar Argentino in Rosario, Santa Fe
- Gol in Santa Fe de la Vera Cruz, Santa Fe
- Impacto in Miramar, Buenos Aires
- LA96.7 in La Plata, Buenos Aires
- Master in Colonia San Bartolomé, Córdoba
- Nacional Clásica in Buenos Aires
- OK in San Rafael, Mendoza
- Radio María in Los Juríes, Santiago del Estero
- Uno in Pergamino, Buenos Aires
- Vorterix Rock in Santa Rosa, La Pampa

== Australia ==
- Radio National in Bathurst, New South Wales
- Triple J in Latrobe Valley, Victoria
- 2GHR in Greater Hume, New South Wales
- 5ADD in Adelaide, South Australia

== Canada (Channel 244) ==
- CBAF-18-FM in Church Point, Nova Scotia
- CBRV-FM in Vanderhoof, British Columbia
- CBV-FM-1 in Ste-Anne-de-Beaupre, Quebec
- CBV-FM-7 in St-Georges-de-Beauce, Quebec
- CBYH-FM in Harrison Hot Springs, British Columbia
- CBYL-FM in Lumby, British Columbia
- CFNW-FM in Port Au Choix, Newfoundland
- CFZM-1-FM in Toronto, Ontario
- CFWE-FM-3 in Moose Hills, Alberta
- CFXW-FM in Whitecourt, Alberta
- CHVR-FM in Pembroke, Ontario
- CHYM-FM in Kitchener, Ontario
- CHYR-FM in Leamington, Ontario
- CIBM-FM-3 in Sully, Quebec
- CIGN-FM in Coaticook, Quebec
- CILT-FM in Steinbach, Manitoba
- CIMS-FM-1 in Dalhousie, New Brunswick
- CJWV-FM in Peterborough, Ontario
- CKGF-2-FM in Greenwood, British Columbia
- CKLU-FM in Sudbury, Ontario
- CKUA-FM-11 in Fort McMurray, Alberta
- VF2350 in Granisle, British Columbia
- VF2428 in Parson, British Columbia
- VF2528 in Creston, British Columbia
- VF2576 in Cawston, British Columbia

== China ==
- CNR The Voice of China in Hohhot, Shaoyang and Weifang
- CNR Business Radio in Zhengzhou
- Zhongshan General Radio in Zhongshan

== Greece ==
Melody 96.7 at Limnos

rastapank 96,7 from Heraklion, Crete

== India ==
- Vividh Bharati

== Indonesia ==
- IMI Radio in Jakarta, Indonesia

== Ireland ==
- RTE Lyric FM (Dublin transmitter)

== Malaysia ==
- Asyik FM in Gerik, Perak
- Minnal FM in Kedah, Perlis & Penang
- Sinar in Klang Valley and Eastern Pahang

== Mexico ==
- XHBY-FM in Tuxpan, Veracruz
- XHCSAQ-FM In Bolonchén de Rejón, Campeche
- XHESE-FM in Champotón, Campeche
- XHGNK-FM in Nuevo Laredo, Tamaulipas
- XHIK-FM in Piedras Negras, Coahuila
- XHNGS-FM in Nogales, Sonora
- XHPAZ-FM in La Paz, Baja California Sur
- XHPCPQ-FM in Felipe Carrillo Puerto, Quintana Roo
- XHPEBJ-FM in Léon, Guanajuato
- XHPZ-FM in Ciudad Guzmán, Jalisco
- XHRLF-FM in Mezcala, Guerrero
- XHSCHQ-FM in Zitácuaro, Michoacán
- XHSCKH-FM in San Antonio La Isla, Estado De Mexico
- XHSPH-FM in San Pedro Huamelula, Oaxaca
- XHY-FM in Celaya, Guanajuato
- XHZK-FM in Tepatitlán de Morelos, Jalisco

== Philippines ==
- DWSK in Baguio City
- DWSL in Olongapo City
- DWLM in Lucena City
- DWWV in Iriga City
- DYKR in Bacolod City
- DYEM in Dumaguete City
- DYCJ in Tacloban City
- DXRG in General Santos City
- DXFR in Kidapawan City
- DXWD in Pagadian City
- DXVA in Butuan City

== Romania ==
- Radio Boom in Ramnicu Sarat, Buzau (TVSat Media Group)

== Turkey ==
- TRT Radyo Haber in Adana
- Radyo 3 in Bursa

== United Arab Emirates ==
- Hit 96.7 FM launched by Arabian Radio Network

== United Kingdom ==
- Clyde 1 (Ayrshire) in Ayr, Ayrshire
- Greatest Hits Radio Derbyshire in the Peak District
- Greatest Hits Radio Lincolnshire in Grantham
- Hits Radio Herefordshire & Worcestershire in Kidderminster
- Hits Radio Liverpool in Liverpool
- MFR in Fraserburgh and Wick
- Q Radio in Belfast

== United States (Channel 244) ==
- KAHR in Poplar Bluff, Missouri
- KALZ in Fowler, California
- KBDB-FM in Forks, Washington
- KBEL-FM in Idabel, Oklahoma
- KCAL in Redlands, California
- KCCG-LP in Greenville, Texas
- KCIL in Morgan City, Louisiana
- KCMQ in Columbia, Missouri
- KCRF-FM in Lincoln City, Oregon
- KCRM-LP in Marshalltown, Iowa
- KDDE-LP in American Falls, Idaho
- KDOG in North Mankato, Minnesota
- KGAP-LP in Los Angeles, California
- KHFI in Georgetown, Texas
- KHIX in Carlin, Nevada
- KICN-LP in Portland, Oregon
- KIIC in Albia, Iowa
- KIMX in Laramie, Wyoming
- KISN (FM) in Belgrade, Montana
- KJBA in Craig, Alaska
- KKCQ-FM in Bagley, Minnesota
- KKEX in Preston, Idaho
- KLJR in Santa Paula, California
- KLXQ in Hot Springs, Arkansas
- KMDZ (FM) in Las Vegas, New Mexico
- KMMG in Benton City, Washington
- KMPK in McPherson, Kansas
- KMRQ in Manteca, California
- KNDH in Carbondale, Colorado
- KNMB in Capitan, New Mexico
- KNOB (FM) in Healdsburg, California
- KNUM-LP in Portland, Oregon
- KOKR in Newport, Arkansas
- KOYE in Frankston, Texas
- KQZZ in Crary, North Dakota
- KRAM-LP in Montevideo, Minnesota
- KRCY in Lake Havasu City, Arizona
- KRNK in Casper, Wyoming
- KSFE in Grants, New Mexico
- KSHF-LP in Espanola, New Mexico
- KSYV in Solvang, California
- KTCK-FM in Flower Mound, Texas
- KUNA in La Quinta, California
- KUTN in Levan, Utah
- KWCL-FM in Oak Grove, Louisiana
- KWIZ in Santa Ana, California
- KWMX in Williams, Arizona
- KWRA-LP in Waco, Texas
- KWWW-FM in Quincy, Washington
- KXOX in Sweetwater, Texas
- KXRD in Fayetteville, Arkansas
- KYLB in Turkey, Texas
- KYLI in Bunkerville, Nevada
- KZAP (FM) in Paradise, California
- KZIN in Shelby, Montana
- KZRV in Sartell, Minnesota
- KZZH-LP in Eureka, California
- WANV in Annville, Kentucky
- WARW in Port Chester, New York
- WBDK in Algoma, Wisconsin
- WBKQ in Alexandria, Indiana
- WBQA in Boothbay Harbor, Maine
- WBVI in Fostoria, Ohio
- WBWB in Bloomington, Indiana
- WBZW in Union City, Georgia
- WCEI in Easton, Maryland
- WCIO in Oswego, New York
- WCKK in Walnut Grove, Mississippi
- WCMJ in Cambridge, Ohio
- WCOE in La Porte, Indiana
- WCOR-FM in Lewis Run, Pennsylvania
- WCSM in Celina, Ohio
- WCVS in Virden, Illinois
- WCXO in Carlyle, Illinois
- WDLD in Halfway, Maryland
- WERA-LP in Arlington, Virginia
- WFFF-FM in Columbia, Mississippi
- WFML in Vincennes, Indiana
- WGBL in Gulfport, Mississippi
- WGNX in Colchester, Illinois
- WGOV-FM in Valdosta, Georgia
- WHTQ in Whiting, Wisconsin
- WIHN in Normal, Illinois
- WJJH in Ashland, Wisconsin
- WJNA in Westminster, South Carolina
- WJVG-LP in Columbus, Ohio
- WKGL-FM in Loves Park, Illinois
- WKJX in Elizabeth City, North Carolina
- WKMM in Kingwood, West Virginia
- WKOV in Wellston, Ohio
- WKRX in Roxboro, North Carolina
- WKXK in Pine Hill, Alabama
- WLLF in Mercer, Pennsylvania
- WLTN in Lisbon, New Hampshire
- WLTY in Cayce, South Carolina
- WLXV in Cadillac, Michigan
- WMHH in Clifton Park, New York
- WMJT in McMillan, Michigan
- WMOD in Bolivar, Tennessee
- WMTB-LP in St. Petersburg, Florida
- WMXA in Opelika, Alabama
- WMYL in Halls Crossroads, Tennessee
- WNKX-FM in Centerville, Tennessee
- WNNN-LP in Noxapater, Mississippi
- WNUC-LP in Detroit, Michigan
- WORX in Madison, Indiana
- WOVO in Auburn, Kentucky
- WPGM in Danville, Pennsylvania
- WQER-LP in Rockville, Maryland
- WQSO in Rochester, New Hampshire
- WRGZ in Rogers City, Michigan
- WSEJ-LP in Spartanburg, South Carolina
- WSEL in Pontotoc, Mississippi
- WSSR in Joliet, Illinois
- WTSA in Brattleboro, Vermont
- WUFN in Albion, Michigan
- WUPG in Republic, Michigan
- WVNW in Burnham, Pennsylvania
- WVPO in Lehman Township, Pennsylvania
- WVVY-LP in Tisbury, Massachusetts
- WWUC-LP in Union City, Pennsylvania
- WWZW in Buena Vista, Virginia
- WXOF in Yankeetown, Florida
- WXZO in Willsboro, New York
- WYSX in Morristown, New York
- WZPH-LP in Dade City, Florida
