= KLWN =

- Lawrence, Kansas; United States
- Broadcast area: Lawrence, Kansas
- Frequency: 1320 KHz
- Branding: 101.7 FM & 1320 AM KLWN

Programming
- Format: News Talk Information
- Affiliations: Fox News Radio; Fox Sports Radio; Compass Media Networks; Premiere Networks; Westwood One; Jayhawk IMG Sports Network; Kansas City Royals

Ownership
- Owner: Great Plains Media, Inc.
- Sister stations: KKSW, KMXN, WKSW, WGSQ, WHUB, WIBL, WPTN, WRPW, WZIM

History
- First air date: February 22, 1951
- Call sign meaning: K LaWreNce

Technical information
- Licensing authority: FCC
- Facility ID: 36744
- Class: B
- Power: 500 watts day 250 watts night
- Translator: 101.7 K269GP (Lawrence)

Links
- Public license information: Public file; LMS
- Website: klwn.com

KLWN (1320 AM) is a radio station broadcasting a News Talk Information format. It is licensed to Lawrence, Kansas, United States. The station is currently owned by Great Plains Media, Inc. and features programming from Fox News Radio, Fox Sports Radio, Compass Media Networks, Premiere Networks, and Westwood One.

The station also broadcasts University of Kansas football and basketball. KLWN is the flagship radio station of the Jayhawk IMG Sports Network. KLWN is also an affiliate of the Kansas City Royals and carries the entire NCAA Men's Division I Basketball Championship from Westwood One.

KLWN's FM counterpart is KKSW, which used to have the callsign KLWN-FM and identified itself as "The Music Station, 106."

The stations were owned for years by Arden Booth, who also served as a Kansas State Senator. Booth had a five-minute daily poetry program called "Poetic License." His son Hank served as general manager, morning news anchor and play-by-play voice of Lawrence High School football games.

Logo before translator sign on

== Personalities ==
- Ed Abels, newscaster (1952–1955) was also host of Comments on Local Affairs.
