= KMXN =

Radio station in Osage City, Kansas

Coordinates: 38.739°N 95.552°W

- Osage City, Kansas; United States
- Broadcast area: Topeka/Lawrence, KS
- Frequency: 92.9 MHz
- Branding: 92.9 The Bull

Programming
- Format: Country
- Affiliations: Compass Media Networks

Ownership
- Owner: Great Plains Media; (Great Plains Licensee, Inc.)
- Sister stations: KLWN, KKSW, WKSW, WGSQ, WHUB, WPTN, WZIM, WRPW, WIBL

History
- First air date: July 26, 1982
- Former call signs: KZOC (1982–1995); KANS (1995–2003); KKYD (2003–2005)
- Call sign meaning: "Max" (former branding)

Technical information
- Licensing authority: FCC
- Facility ID: 7946
- Class: C2
- ERP: 42,000 watts
- HAAT: 163 meters (535 ft)

Links
- Public license information: Public file; LMS
- Webcast: Listen live
- Website: www.bull929.com

KMXN (92.9 FM) is a commercial radio station licensed to Osage City, Kansas, United States, and serves the Topeka and Lawrence areas of Kansas with a country music format. It is owned by Great Plains Media with studios on West 6th Street in Lawrence.

The transmitter is off North 2100 Road in Grover.

== History ==
=== 1981-1995: Country ===
Originally, the station served Emporia at 92.7 FM, with a transmitter located north of the city near Admire. The earliest call letters are KZOC, first assigned in 1981, when the station was still a construction permit. KZOC signed on the air on July 26, 1982. It played country music using the name "KZ93." The station eventually moved to 92.9 FM and upgraded power to 36,000 watts in 1989.

=== 1995-2003: Oldies ===
In 1995, the station flipped to oldies. The station changed call letters to KANS-FM on April 1. The oldies format was satellite-fed. Owner C&C Consulting downgraded the transmitter to 7,900 watts in 2000.

=== 2003-2005: Rhythmic Top 40 ===
After a sale to 3 Point Communications in July 2003, the station relocated its transmitter to a location between Scranton and Carbondale; the purpose of this was to target Topeka. Along with the transmitter re-location, the station began stunting with a continuous loop of Tone Loc's "Wild Thing." On August 11, 2003, "Wild 92-9", Topeka's Hottest Jams, made its debut with a Rhythmic CHR format. On August 18, 2003, KANS-FM changed call letters to KKYD, with the KANS call letters being moved to KRWV (then located at 99.5 FM, now at 96.1 FM) in Emporia. The station was an affiliate for the Portland, Oregon-based morning show "The Playhouse" and "Pocos Pero Locos", a Hispanic-targeting hip hop show. Despite the new owners using the same playlist for several months, the station actually did well in the ratings, though advertising revenues were low.

=== 2005-2006: Adult Hits ===
Using the name Viking Media, and later becoming Great Plains Media, Jerome Zimmer bought the station in early 2005. Zimmer reportedly didn't want to be involved with an Urban-related format, so around the time KLZR flipped from Top 40 to Hot AC, KKYD pulled the plug on its Rhythmic format on July 18, 2005. After three days of stunting with a mix of children's music, polkas, and bagpipe tunes, KKYD flipped at Midnight on July 21 to adult hits, branded as "92-9 Max FM." KKYD changed call letters to KMXN on August 9. Throughout its tenure as "Max", the station had no on air DJs. Great Plains Media upgraded the wattage to 42,000 watts, moving the transmitter again, this time near Overbrook.

=== 2006-2009: Rock ===
On February 21, 2006, KMXN flipped to classic rock, branded as "X 92.9." This was done to compete more directly against KDVV and KWIC. KMXN added live air talent, plus the syndicated Bob & Tom Show. During this time, KMXN started to carry Lawrence High School sports.

On January 18, 2007, "X" transitioned from classic rock to a more current-based active rock format. The station began targeting Lawrence during this time period. KMXN kept "Bob & Tom" in morning drive for a while, before replacing them in 2008 with the Grand Rapids-based show Free Beer and Hot Wings.

=== 2009-present: Country ===
On October 7, 2009, KMXN began stunting again, this time with television theme songs. The following day at Noon, the station flipped to country, branded as "92.9 the Bull". The station affiliated with Big D and Bubba for its morning drive show. The flip made KMXN the fourth country station in the Topeka area, the others being 102.9 KTOP-FM, 94.5 WIBW-FM and 106.9 KTPK (which airs Classic Country).

Ottawa-licensed KOFO (1220 AM) simulcasted on 92.9's HD Radio digital subchannel from 2011 to 2013.

== Current on-air personalities ==
- Big D and Bubba - The Big D and Bubba Show 5-9A (Mon. thru Sat.)
