= WWHX =

Radio station in Normal, Illinois

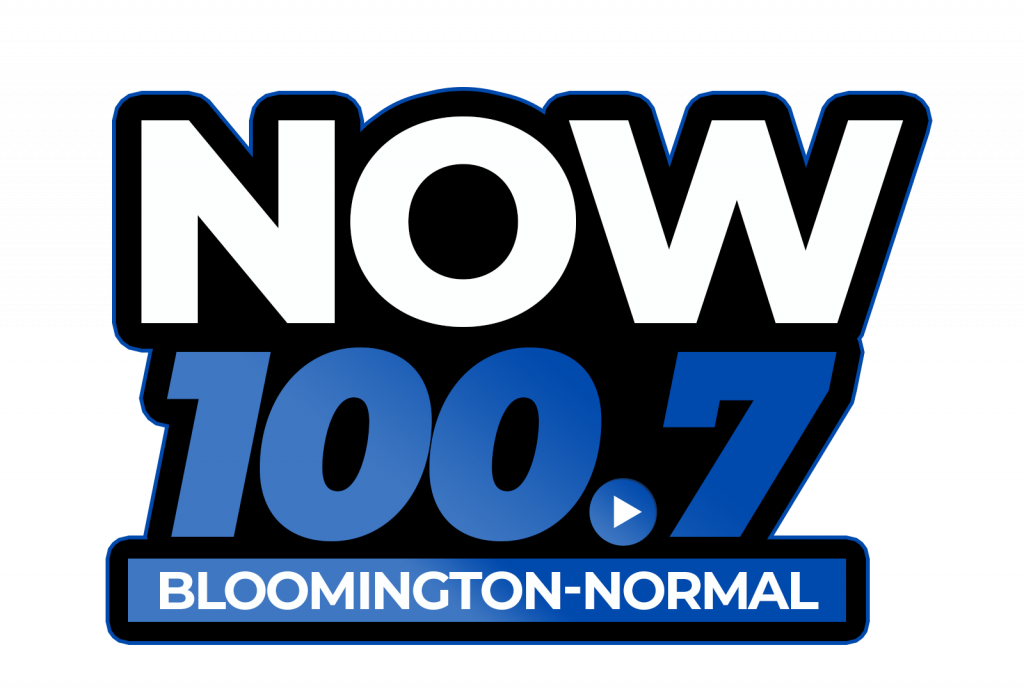
- Normal, Illinois; United States
- Broadcast area: Bloomington-Normal
- Frequency: 100.7 MHz
- Branding: Now 100.7

Programming
- Format: Hot adult contemporary

Ownership
- Owner: Woodward Community Media (sale to Northwestern Media pending); (Woodward Community Media Bloomington, LLC)
- Sister stations: WBBE, WIHN

History
- First air date: August 12, 2005
- Former call signs: WNDQ (2005, CP); WVMG (2005–2012)

Technical information
- Licensing authority: FCC
- Facility ID: 164105
- Class: A
- ERP: 4,200 watts
- HAAT: 105 meters (344 ft)
- Transmitter coordinates: 40°27′8.1″N 88°57′48.3″W

Links
- Public license information: Public file; LMS
- Webcast: Listen live
- Website: WWHX Online

WWHX (100.7 FM) is a commercial radio station in Normal, Illinois, serving the Bloomington-Normal radio market. It is owned by Woodward Community Media through licensee Woodward Community Media Bloomington, LLC. It airs a hot adult contemporary format. The studios are at 1 Brickyard Drive in Bloomington.

WWHX is a Class A FM station, with an effective radiated power (ERP) of 4,200 watts. The transmitter is off East Hamilton Road near Morrissey Drive (U.S. Route 150) in Normal.

== History ==
=== Adult contemporary as "Magic 100.7" (2005-2012) ===
The station signed on the air on August 12, 2005. The original call sign was WVMG and the moniker was "Magic 100.7." It received its FCC license on January 10, 2006. Magic was a direct competitor to Star 107.7 (now WIBL). But Magic 100.7 had a better signal within Bloomington/Normal. The station was able to eventually drive competitor Star 107.7 out of the format in 2007.

Throughout its years as an AC station, it flipped to Christmas music every November. The station hired Fasig, a known talent from WBNQ as a morning host.

=== Top 40 (2012-2018) and Rhythmic Contemporary (2018-2021) ===
In March 2012, then-owner Connoisseur Media pulled the plug on Magic. It flipped to a Top 40 (CHR) format as "Hits 100.7."

The station continued to air contemporary hit music until April 1, 2018. On that date, it shifted over to a Rhythmic Contemporary format with the branding "Hot 100.7: The Beat of BloNo." The first song was "Hot in Herre" by Nelly. It played the top rhythmic hits of the day mixed with titles from the past decade.

=== Hot AC (2022-present) ===
On November 1, 2021, WWHX dropped its Rhythmic Contemporary format and began stunting with Christmas music as "100.7 - Bloomington-Normal's Christmas Station".

After the holidays, on January 1, 2022, the station flipped to hot adult contemporary as "Now 100.7." The first song on "Now" was "Take Me to Church" by Hozier.

On Feb 6, 2025, Woodward announced a sale of WWHX to Northwestern Media, which owns stations such as KTIS-FM and WCIC. This sale concludes Woodward's sell off of Bloomington-Normal cluster shortly after buying Springfield IL stations from Mid-West Family Broadcasting in November 2024. The sale will result in the end of the hot AC format, as Northwestern does not run secular formats on their stations.

== Previous logo ==
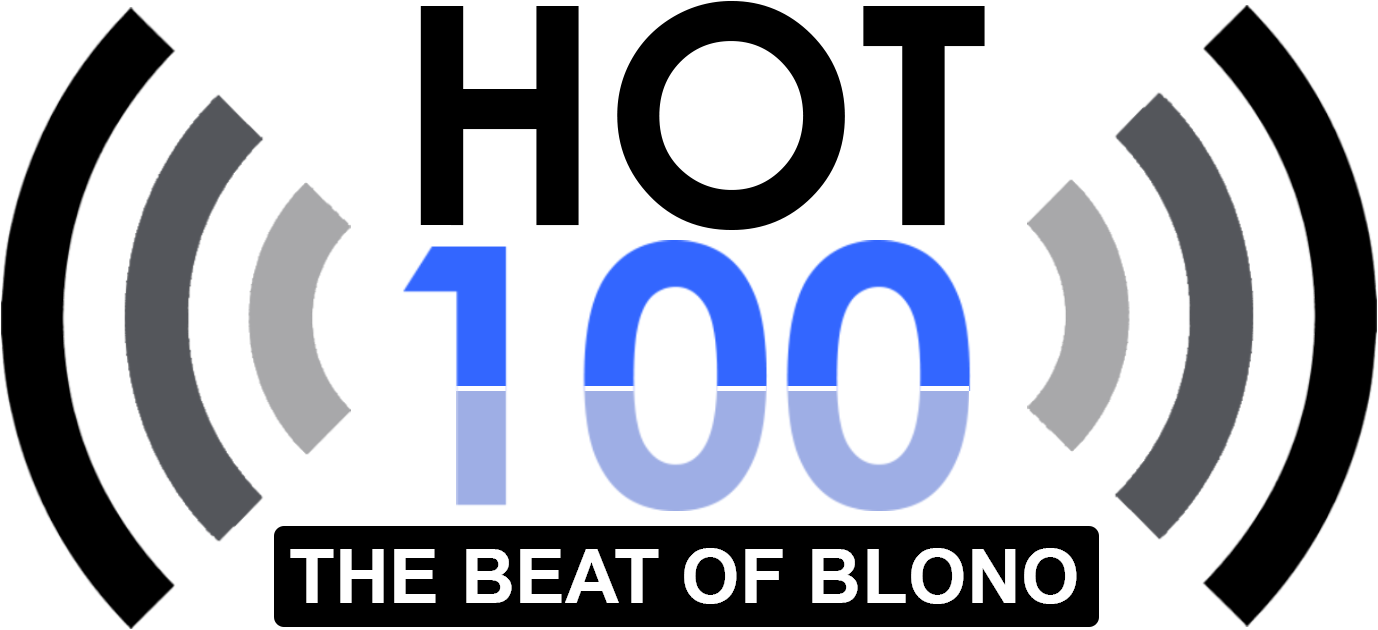
