= WGSQ =

- Cookeville, Tennessee; United States
- Broadcast area: Upper Cumberland Area
- Frequency: 94.7 MHz
- Branding: 94.7 The Giant

Programming
- Format: Country

Ownership
- Owner: Cookeville Communications, LLC
- Sister stations: KKSW, KMXN, WKSW, KLWN, WHUB, WPTN, WDQZ, WRPW, WYST

History
- Call sign meaning: WPTN-FM (1979–1981)

Technical information
- Licensing authority: FCC
- Facility ID: 13819
- Class: C
- ERP: 100,000 watts
- HAAT: 402 meters (1,319 ft)
- Transmitter coordinates: 36°10′26″N 85°20′37″W

Links
- Public license information: Public file; LMS
- Webcast: Listen Live
- Website: countrygiant.com

WGSQ (94.7 FM, "Country Giant 94.7") is a radio station licensed to serve Cookeville, Tennessee, United States. The station is owned by Cookeville Communications, LLC.

WGSQ broadcasts a country music format to the Upper Cumberland Area. Syndicated weekday programming includes Big D & Bubba and CMT After Midnite with Cody Alan.

WGSQ-FM signed on many years ago as WPTN-FM, then on 94.3. The station would change its call letters to WGSQ and would be known as "Q-94." The station, at the time, was owned by Drue Huffines and Bob Gallaher. Then in the late 1980s, WGSQ would from 94.3 to 94.7 and would be known as "The Country Giant" with 100,000 watts of power.

The station was assigned the call sign WGSQ by the Federal Communications Commission on December 21, 1981.
