= Mass media in Lawrence, Kansas =

Lawrence is a center of media in northeastern Kansas. The following is a list of media outlets based in the city.

== Print ==
=== Newspapers ===
The Lawrence Journal-World is the city's primary newspaper, published daily. In addition, the University of Kansas publishes a student newspaper, the University Daily Kansan, twice a week in print and continuously online at kansan.com during the school year and weekly during the summer.

== Radio ==
Due to Lawrence's proximity to both Topeka and Kansas City, local listeners can receive the signal of radio stations broadcasting from both cities' markets.

The following stations are licensed to and/or broadcast from Lawrence:

=== AM ===
Frequency	Callsign	Format	City of License	Notes
1320	KLWN	News/Talk	Lawrence, Kansas	-

=== FM ===
Frequency	Callsign	Format	City of License	Notes
90.7	KJHK	Variety	Lawrence, Kansas	University of Kansas college radio
91.1	KCIU	Religious	Lawrence, Kansas	
91.5	KANU	Public	Lawrence, Kansas	NPR
92.9	KMXN	Country	Osage City, Kansas	Broadcasts from Lawrence
96.1	K241AR	Christian Contemporary	Lawrence, Kansas	Translator of KHRI, Hollister, California
101.7	KLWN	News/Talk	Lawrence, Kansas	
105.9	KKSW	Top 40	Lawrence, Kansas	-

== Television ==
Lawrence lies within the Kansas City television market. Due to Lawrence's proximity to Topeka, local viewers can also receive the signal of several television stations broadcasting in the Topeka television market.

The following is a list of stations licensed to and/or broadcasting from Lawrence:

Display Channel	Network	Callsign	City of License	Notes
38.1	Ind.	KMCI-TV	Lawrence, Kansas	Broadcasts from studios in Kansas City, Missouri
38.2	Bounce TV	KMCI-TV	Lawrence, Kansas	Broadcasts from studios in Kansas City, Missouri
38.3	Escape			
38.4	Grit TV			
