= XHRLF-FM =

Radio station in Mezcala, Guerrero

- Carrizalillo, Guerrero; Mexico
- Frequency: 96.7 FM
- Branding: La Filosita

Programming
- Format: Full-service (mining)

Ownership
- Owner: Equinox Gold; (Radio La Filosita, A.C.)

History
- First air date: June 2009
- Former frequencies: 99.1 FM
- Call sign meaning: Radio La Filosita

Technical information
- Class: A
- ERP: 1.335 kW
- HAAT: 530 m
- Transmitter coordinates: 17°52′12.58″N 99°40′51.68″W

XHRLF-FM is a radio station on 96.7 FM, known as "Radio La Filosita", serving Carrizalillo in the Mexican state of Guerrero. Its operation is part of the Los Filos mine.

== History ==
On November 28, 2017, the Federal Telecommunications Institute approved the award of this station, but the operation of a radio station here predates the concession by a number of years. In June 2009, Goldcorp, which at the time owned the mine, put La Filosita on the air as part of the mine's safety program. The station won company awards for helping the mine improve its safety record.

The station transmits music, safety messages and information for the workers at the mine, as well as educational programming produced by the Instituto Nacional para la Educación de los Adultos and interviews with visitors to the mine.

As the application was on file with the IFT, Goldcorp sold the Los Filos mine to Leagold Mining Corporation as part of a divestiture of non-core assets. In approving the station's concession, IFT commissioners expressed concern that Goldcorp's shareholders and directors were still listed as stakeholders in Radio La Filosita, A.C., and that the employees and local residents did not have an ownership stake in it or the other station for which Goldcorp filed, XHESP-FM at the Peñasquito Polymetallic Mine in Zacatecas.
