= WJBC =

WJBC may refer to:

- WJBC (AM), a radio station (1230 AM) licensed to Bloomington, Illinois, United States
- WPOK (FM), a radio station (93.7 FM) licensed to Pontiac, Illinois, which held the call sign WJBC-FM from 2010 to 2026
- WTRJ-FM, a radio station (91.7 FM) licensed to Orange Park, Florida, United States, which held the call sign WJBC-FM from 2006 to 2010
- WBNQ, a radio station (101.5 FM) licensed to Bloomington, Illinois, which held the call sign WJBC-FM from 1947 to 1965
