= WPOK =

WPOK may refer to:

- 93.7 WPOK (FM) Pontiac, Illinois: a radio station (FCC facility ID 37818)
- 1080 WPOK (AM) Pontiac, Illinois: a defunct radio station (FCC facility ID 37822) on the air from 1966 to 1998

== See also ==
- Wikipedia:WikiProject Oklahoma
