= WBWN =

Country music radio station in Le Roy, Illinois, United States

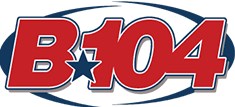
- Le Roy, Illinois; United States
- Broadcast area: Bloomington-Normal, Illinois
- Frequency: 104.1 MHz (HD Radio)
- Branding: B104

Programming
- Format: Country
- Affiliations: Westwood One

Ownership
- Owner: Cumulus Media; (Cumulus Licensing LLC)
- Sister stations: WBNQ; WJBC; WJEZ

History
- First air date: October 15, 1979 (as WMLA-FM at 92.7)
- Former call signs: WMLA-FM (1979–1990); WRXZ (1990–1992)
- Former frequencies: 92.7 MHz (1979–1994)

Technical information
- Licensing authority: FCC
- Facility ID: 40906
- Class: B1
- ERP: 47,000 watts
- HAAT: 100 meters (330 ft)
- Transmitter coordinates: 40°25′25″N 88°52′28″W

Links
- Public license information: Public file; LMS
- Webcast: Listen live
- Website: www.wbwn.com

WBWN (104.1 FM, "B104") is a radio station licensed to the community of Le Roy, Illinois, and serving the greater Bloomington, Illinois, area. The station is owned by Cumulus Media. It airs a country music format.

The station was assigned the WBWN call letters by the Federal Communications Commission on December 21, 1992.

The station was the lone country music station in the Bloomington area until the 2007 flipping of WIBL to a country format.
