= WJEZ (disambiguation) =

WJEZ is a radio station (98.9 FM) licensed to Dwight, Illinois.

WJEZ may also refer to:

- WSCR-FM, a radio station (104.3 FM) licensed to Chicago, Illinois, which held the call sign WJEZ from 1977 to 1984
- WPOK (FM), a radio station (93.7 FM) licensed to Pontiac, Illinois, which held the call sign WJEZ from 1984 to 2003
