= Stretch Miller =

American sportscaster and announcer (1910–1972)

Campbell A. "Stretch" Miller (March 15, 1910 – October 25, 1972) was an American sportscaster who worked for eight years as a play-by-play announcer for the St. Louis Cardinals. Earlier in his career, Miller broadcast Illinois State Normal University athletics and other local sports on WJBC radio in Bloomington-Normal, Illinois.

== Personal life ==
The 13th child and seventh son of James and Margaret McMillan Miller, “Stretch” Miller was born in St. Louis, but moved to Chicago with his family when he was five. Miller attended Hyde Park High School where he was given the nickname “Stretch” by Chicago Tribune sports writer Westbrook Pegler. When the Hyde Park boys' basketball team played before a Purdue-University of Chicago game, Pegler compared Miller’s 6'6", 220-pound frame to Purdue star “Stretch” Murphy.

After graduating from Hyde Park, Miller briefly attended the University of Illinois, before transferring to Illinois State Normal University (now known as Illinois State University). Miller became a standout player on ISNU’s men’s basketball team, and in 1931, he led the Cardinals (now known as the Redbirds) to the Little Nineteen Conference basketball championship. Miller also served as the editor of the Vidette, student newspaper, was class president, and was involved in drama and music at ISNU. Miller went on to marry Dorothy Nell Salzman in 1942, and they had a son, Robert.

== Early broadcasting career ==
Shortly after graduating from Illinois State Normal University in 1933, Miller was hired by newly established Bloomington-Normal, Illinois radio station, WJBC. Miller was expected to announce news and sports, plus handle recorded shows, do a man-on-the-street program, write commercials and help sell advertisements. Miller’s first sports play-by-play job consisted of broadcasting Bloomington Bloomers baseball games. The Bloomers were members of the Three-Eye, a Class B league, and served as a farm team for the St. Louis Cardinals. Miller also broadcast play-by-play of Illinois State Normal University, Illinois Wesleyan, and local high school basketball and football.

In 1940, Miller moved to Springfield, Illinois, where he was hired by WCBS radio. Miller worked in Springfield for two years, before he enlisted in the U.S. Navy from 1942-45. Miller and his crew were responsible for transporting Army and Marine personnel to various island invasions. Upon his return to Springfield in 1945, Miller continued at WCBS.

== St. Louis Cardinals ==
In the summer of 1946, Miller was contacted by Oscar Zahner, the head of Ruthrauff and Ryan advertising, which handled the account of Greisedieck Brothers Beer, the sponsors of the St. Louis Cardinals. Miller was asked to audition for an open Cardinals radio announcing position. Following his audition, Miller was hired to join the Cardinals broadcasting team of Harry Caray and Charles “Gabby” Street. Miller was given an eight-year contract, which was scheduled to be terminated when Busch bought the Cardinals in 1954, ending Greisedieck’s sponsorship.

During his time in St. Louis, Miller not only broadcast Cardinals games, but also other local sporting events, including professional St. Louis Bombers basketball, professional St. Louis Flyers hockey, Washington University in St. Louis and Saint Louis University college football and basketball, and some local high school sports. Miller remained with the Cardinals until his contract ended in 1954.

== Post-Cardinals Career ==
After leaving his play-by-play job with the Cardinals, Miller did freelance sports broadcasting work in St. Louis for a year, before he and his family moved to Peoria, Illinois. Miller was hired as the station manager and sports director at a yet-to-be-open television station, owned by radio station WIRL. Miller worked at WIRL until the television station was operational; however, when funding for the station fell through, Miller was forced to work elsewhere.

Miller was hired by the Peoria newspaper, the Journal Star, where he began working in the Community Relations Department in 1959. Additionally, Miller offered his services as a banquet and luncheon speaker. By the end of his career, Miller estimated that he made 2,000 speeches and worked on 25,000 sports broadcasts. Miller died from incurable Amyothrophic Lateral Sclerosis (Lou Gehrig’s disease) in 1972.

== Accolades ==
Following his eight-year stint with the St. Louis Cardinals, Miller was inducted into the Cardinals’ Hall of Fame, and honored with “Stretch Miller Weekend” in St. Louis in 1971. Miller was also inducted into the Illinois State University Athletics Hall of Fame in 1972. In his honor, the Stretch Miller Award is presented annually by Illinois State to an individual who has displayed commitment and dedicated service to the ISU athletics department.
