= WLIN =

WLIN may refer to:

- WLIN (AM), a radio station (1380 AM) licensed to serve Waynesboro, Pennsylvania, United States
- WLIN-FM, a radio station (103.7 FM) licensed to serve Durant, Mississippi, United States
