= WPOK (AM) =

- Pontiac, Illinois; United States
- Broadcast area: Bloomington-Normal
- Frequency: 1080 kHz

Programming
- Format: Adult standards
- Affiliations: CBS; Tribune

Ownership
- Sister stations: WPOK-FM; WLDC

History
- First air date: August 1, 1966
- Last air date: March 1998

Technical information
- Facility ID: 37822
- Power: 1,000 watts (daytime only)
- Transmitter coordinates: 40.87528°N 88.60306°W

WPOK was a daytime-only AM broadcasting station in Pontiac, Illinois, in the late 20th century. Owned by Collins Miller and Lane Lindstrom, it went on the air on August 1, 1966. In 1975 it was running a middle of the road (music) format, simulcast on its FM sister station 103.1 WPOK-FM. The FM changed its callsign to WJEZ in November 1984, and by 1989 AM and FM had separate formats: 1080 WPOK with oldies and 103.1 WJEZ with modern country music.

WPOK was silent by March 1998, last having an adult standards format. It surrendered its license on March 24, 1998, during its renewal process, and was deleted on June 18, 1998. The station's license was surrendered so that WNWI AM 1080 could move from Valparaiso, Indiana, to Oak Lawn, Illinois, and increase power from 250 watts to 1,900 watts. Its FM sister station, which had recently changed frequency to 93.7, survived to become WTRX-FM in 2003, then WJBC-FM in 2010; it retook the WPOK call sign in 2026 after Kent Casson, whose career started at WPOK, bought the FM station from Cumulus Media.
