= KRRC =

KRRC may refer to:

- KRRC-LP, a low-power radio station (94.3 FM) licensed to serve Rogue River, Oregon, United States
- KXRY, a radio station (91.1 FM) licensed to serve Portland, Oregon, which held the call sign KRRC from 1958 to 2013
- King's Royal Rifle Corps
