= XHESP-FM =

Two radio stations in Mexico hold the callsign XHESP-FM:

- XHESP-FM (Jalisco), 91.9 in San Pedro Tlaquepaque/Guadalajara
- XHESP-FM (Zacatecas), 98.9 in Mazapil
