= WGIC =

WGIC may refer to:

- WGIC-LP, a low-power radio station (94.9 FM) licensed to serve Clarksville, Tennessee, United States
- WKSW, a radio station (98.5 FM) licensed to serve Cookeville, Tennessee, which held the call sign WGIC from 1997 to 2013
