= WBBE =

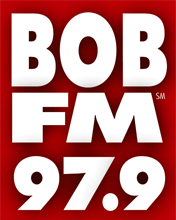
- Heyworth, Illinois; United States
- Broadcast area: Bloomington-Normal, Illinois
- Frequency: 97.9 MHz
- Branding: 97.9 Bob FM

Programming
- Format: Adult hits

Ownership
- Owner: Great Plains Media; (Great Plains Media)
- Sister stations: WWHX, WIHN

History
- First air date: 2005
- Call sign meaning: W BoB E

Technical information
- Licensing authority: FCC
- Facility ID: 164104
- Class: A
- ERP: 5,400 watts
- HAAT: 105 meters (344 ft)
- Transmitter coordinates: 40°20′55″N 88°58′56″W

Links
- Public license information: Public file; LMS
- Webcast: Listen live
- Website: bob979fm.com

WBBE (97.9 FM, "97.9 Bob FM") is an adult hits hybrid radio station licensed to Heyworth, Illinois, and residing in the Bloomington-Normal, Illinois, market. It is owned and operated by Elizabeth Neuhoff's Neuhoff Corp., through licensee Neuhoff Media Bloomington, LLC.
