= WBBE (disambiguation) =

WBBE may refer to:

- WBBE, a radio station (97.9 FM) licensed to Heyworth, Illinois
- WRDF, a radio station (106.3 FM) licensed to Columbia City, Indiana which held the call sign WBBE in 1990
- WWTF, a radio station (1580 AM) licensed to Georgetown, Kentucky, which held the call sign WBBE from 1992 to 1995
- WPHR-FM, a radio station (94.7 FM) licensed to Gifford, Florida which held the call sign WBBE from 1994 to 1998
- WCZR, a radio station (101.7 FM) licensed to Vero Beach, Florida which held the call sign WBBE from 1998 to 1999
