= Arlington Independent Media =

Nonprofit organization providing television production training

Arlington Independent Media (AIM), formerly Arlington Community Television, is a nonprofit membership organization providing television production training workshops and professional production facilities, as well as the public, educational, and government access (PEG) cable TV channel on Comcast channel 69, and Verizon FIOS channel 38 in Arlington County, Virginia, United States.

== History ==
The station was established in 1984 as Arlington Community Television offering residents of the county the chance to train in producing material for broadcast and to produce shows. In 2004, prompted by the approaching 2004 expiration of its contract with Comcast (formerly AT&T Broadband), the station began preparations to become a not for profit corporation, renaming itself Arlington Independent Media, and enabling a major expansion of its budget and offerings.

== Operation ==
The Arlington Independent Media production facility is equipped with a three-camera television studio, DV-Cam portable production equipment, the Final Cut Pro non-linear edit system, and a four-camera mobile production van. All equipment is available to members who have completed television production workshops and intend to create programming for the Public-access television channel, and is used in apprenticeship programs run by the station to train aspiring documentary filmmakers.

== WERA-LP ==
In December 2015, Arlington Independent Media launched WERA-LP, a radio station. An event was held at Arlington Independent Media where members and others celebrated the first airing of WERA-LP.
