= XHPZ-FM =

Radio station in Ciudad Guzmán, Jalisco, Mexico

- Ciudad Guzmán, Jalisco; Mexico
- Frequency: 96.7 FM
- Branding: Radio Sensación

Programming
- Format: Regional Mexican

Ownership
- Owner: XHPZ FM 96.7, S.A. de C.V.

History
- First air date: June 29, 1979 (concession)

Technical information
- Licensing authority: CRT
- Class: B
- ERP: 30.818 kW
- HAAT: 239.9 m (787 ft)

Links
- Website: www.radiosensacion.fm

XHPZ-FM is a radio station on 96.7 FM in Ciudad Guzmán, Jalisco. It is known as Radio Sensación and carries a Regional Mexican format.

== History ==
XHPZ received its concession on June 29, 1979. It was owned by Jorge Valdovinos López.
