= CIGN-FM =

Radio station in Coaticook, Quebec

Coordinates: 45°03′09″N 71°42′13″W

- Coaticook, Quebec, Canada; Canada
- Frequency: 96.7 MHz

Programming
- Language: French
- Format: community radio

Ownership
- Owner: Radio coopérative de Coaticook, Coop de solidarité

History
- First air date: October 27, 2009 (approval)

Technical information
- Class: B1
- ERP: 1.418 kWs average 2.92 kWs peak
- HAAT: 181.8 meters (596 ft)

Links
- Website: CIGN Website

CIGN-FM is a Canadian radio station, that broadcasts a French-language community radio format on the frequency 96.7 MHz (FM) in Coaticook, Quebec.

Owned by Radio coopérative de Coaticook, Coop de solidarité, the station received CRTC approval on October 27, 2009.

CIGN-FM started broadcasting over the Web on August 4, 2011 and on 96.7 FM May 2012.

The station is a member of the Association des radiodiffuseurs communautaires du Québec.
