= KNUM-LP =

Low-power FM radio station in Portland, Oregon

- Portland, Oregon; United States
- Frequency: 96.7 MHz
- Branding: 96.7 The Numberz

Programming
- Format: Mainstream urban

Ownership
- Owner: Community Alliance of Tenants

History
- First air date: July 14, 2017; 9 years ago
- Former call signs: KZRY-LP (2017–2018)
- Call sign meaning: Numberz

Technical information
- Licensing authority: FCC
- Facility ID: 196097
- Class: L1
- ERP: 11 watts
- HAAT: 90.8 meters (298 ft)
- Transmitter coordinates: 45°32′25.8″N 122°33′51″W

Links
- Public license information: LMS

KNUM-LP is a low-power FM radio station broadcasting on 96.7 FM in Portland, Oregon. It is owned by the Community Alliance of Tenants and is known as "96.7 The Numberz", airing a mainstream urban music format.

== History ==
On November 15, 2013, the Community Alliance of Tenants, a tenants rights organization, applied to build a new low-power FM radio station on 96.7 MHz in Portland. The Federal Communications Commission approved its application in September 2014 as two of the four applicants for the frequency dropped out and the other two—the Community Alliance and Opal Environmental Justice Oregon—moved their LP facilities to avoid interference with each other.

Sounds from KZRY-LP Portland playing on 96.7FM

The station filed for its license to cover on September 20, 2017, having gone on air under the call sign KZRY-LP. Behind the founding of the station were two graduates of Grant High School, one of which was a founder of KXRY (branded as "XRAY.FM"). In its initial months on air as KZRY-LP, it aired a loop featuring audio of speeches by Martin Luther King Jr. and John F. Kennedy and from the Apollo 11 mission, Sputnik 1, some music (Metal Machine Music and various versions of Run Through the Jungle), and programs from XRAY.

A year later, on August 29, 2018, the station began operating normally and changed its call sign to KNUM-LP.
