= WLIN-FM =

- Durant, Mississippi; United States
- Broadcast area: Durant-Kosciusko, Mississippi
- Frequency: 103.7 MHz
- Branding: Breezy 103

Programming
- Format: Adult contemporary

Ownership
- Owner: Boswell Media, LLC
- Sister stations: WCKK, WKOZ-FM

History
- First air date: 1997
- Former call signs: WKOZ-FM (1997)
- Former frequencies: 101.1 MHz (1997–2025)

Technical information
- Licensing authority: FCC
- Facility ID: 78151
- Class: C3
- ERP: 8,400 watts
- HAAT: 100 meters (328 feet)
- Transmitter coordinates: 33°03′51.00″N 89°36′12.00″W

Links
- Public license information: Public file; LMS
- Webcast: Listen Live
- Website: www.breezynews.com

WLIN-FM (103.7 FM, "Breezy 103") is a radio station licensed to serve the community of Durant, Mississippi. The station is owned by Boswell Media, LLC, and airs an adult contemporary format.

== History ==
The station was assigned the call sign WKOZ-FM by the Federal Communications Commission on January 9, 1997. The station changed its call sign to WLIN-FM on March 3, 1997.

In July 2025, WLIN-FM improved its signal by moving to 103.7 MHz and changing to a nondirectional antenna. The ERP was increased with a slight decrease in HAAT.
