= KXRW-LP =

Community radio station in Vancouver, Washington, United States

- Vancouver, Washington; United States
- Frequency: 99.9 MHz
- Branding: KXRW 99.9 FM Community Radio

Programming
- Format: community radio
- Affiliations: XRAY.FM

Ownership
- Owner: Media Institute for Social Change

History
- First air date: 2015

Technical information
- Licensing authority: FCC
- Facility ID: 197004
- Power: low-power FM station
- Transmitter coordinates: 45°39′6″N 122°36′1″W

Links
- Public license information: LMS
- Website: KXRW 99.9 FM Community Radio

KXRW-LP 99.9 FM Community Radio is a low-power FM non-commercial radio station broadcasting in Vancouver, Washington. The station is licensed to the Media Institute for Social Change, an Oregon-based nonprofit organization. As of March 2017, KXRW-LP relays programming from KXRY, branded as XRAY.FM in Portland, Oregon.
