= WPOK (FM) =

- Pontiac, Illinois; United States
- Broadcast area: Bloomington-Normal
- Frequency: 93.7 MHz
- Branding: Route 24 Radio

Programming
- Format: Full service; classic hits

Ownership
- Owner: Kent Casson; (Casson Media, LLC)

History
- First air date: July 1969 (as WPOK-FM at 103.1)
- Former call signs: WPOK-FM (1969–1984); WJEZ (1984–2003); WTRX-FM (2003–2010); WJBC-FM (2010–2026)
- Former frequencies: 103.1 MHz (1969–1990s)
- Call sign meaning: named for former sister station WPOK (1080 AM)

Technical information
- Licensing authority: FCC
- Facility ID: 37818
- Class: B1
- ERP: 12,000 watts
- HAAT: 144 meters (472 ft)
- Transmitter coordinates: 40°45′27.1″N 88°37′40.2″W (NAD83)

Links
- Public license information: Public file; LMS
- Webcast: Listen live
- Website: www.route24radio.com

WPOK (93.7 MHz) is a commercial FM radio station licensed to Pontiac, Illinois, in the Bloomington-Normal radio market. It is owned by Kent Casson's Casson Media and broadcasts a full service format featuring classic hits, calling itself "Route 24 Radio". The transmitter is on County Road 3200 North in Weston, Illinois.

WPOK-FM went on the air in 1969 as the FM sister station to WPOK (1080 AM). It became WJEZ in 1984, and by 1989 was a country music station. During the 2000s, it was WTRX-FM, playing classic rock and then oldies. In 2010, it became WJBC-FM, the FM simulcast to news/talk station WJBC (1230 AM); in 2014, the simulcast was replaced by the Nash Icon country network. Cumulus Media closed WJBC-FM in 2025 and sold it to Casson Media; in 2026, it retook the WPOK call sign and relaunched with the full service "Route 24 Radio" programming that Casson already operated as an Internet radio station.

== History ==
The station signed on the air in July 1969 as WPOK-FM. It had 3,000 watts and broadcast on 103.1 MHz. WPOK-FM served as an FM simulcast of its sister station, WPOK (1080 AM).

WPOK-FM changed its call sign to WJEZ in November 1984. WJEZ was a modern country station by 1989, and received authorization to move from 103.1 MHz to 93.7 MHz in the early 1990s. WPOK AM went off the air in 1998.

In 2003, the WJEZ callsign was moved to sister station 98.9 at Dwight, Illinois. Replacing WJEZ on 93.7 was WTRX-FM, a classic rock station with the nickname "Thunder 93.7 WTRX". It later became "WTRX, The Oldies Channel", from the name of the Westwood One's music network format it used; the music network was purchased by Dial Global and WTRX-FM began using Dial Global's Kool Gold format, except during mornings.

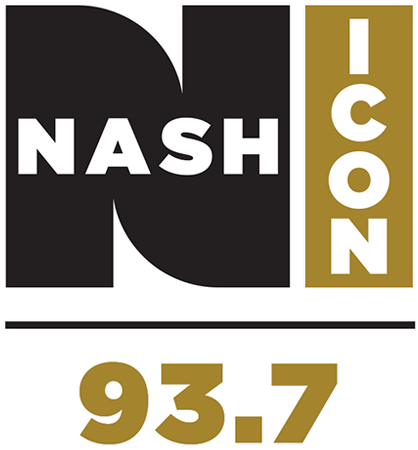
Logo as "93.7 Nash Icon"

In 2010, the station changed its call sign to WJBC-FM and began simulcasting the talk radio format on sister station WJBC (1230 AM) in Bloomington. On August 15, 2014, at 3 pm, WJBC-FM split from the simulcast and became one of the first stations to flip to the new "Nash Icon" country network as 93.7 Nash Icon.

WJBC-FM went silent in March 2025. It was one of 11 Cumulus stations to close the weekend of March 14, as part of a larger shutdown of underperforming Cumulus stations. On December 1, 2025, Cumulus sold WJBC-FM to Kent Casson's Casson Media for $90,000; the terms of the deal required the station to stop sharing the WJBC call sign. On March 16, 2026, the station returned to the air as "Route 24 Radio", with a full service classic hits format that Casson had already operated as an Internet radio station; the call sign was changed to WPOK, a nod to the original WPOK (1080 AM) and a partial return to the FM station's original call sign.
