= XHESE-FM =

Radio station in Champotón, Campeche, Mexico

- Champotón, Campeche, Mexico; Mexico
- Frequency: 96.7 MHz
- Branding: La Ke Buena

Programming
- Format: Grupera
- Affiliations: Radiópolis

Ownership
- Owner: Núcleo Comunicación del Sureste; (Radio Comercial de Campeche, S.A.)

History
- First air date: October 16, 1970 (concession)

Technical information
- ERP: 6 kW
- HAAT: 39.38 meters
- Transmitter coordinates: 19°21′19.75″N 90°43′20.43″W

Links
- Webcast: Listen live
- Website: ncscampeche.com/radiochannel/ke-buena-champoton/

XHESE-FM is a radio station on 96.7 FM in Champotón, Campeche, Mexico. The station is owned by Núcleo Comunicación del Sureste and carries La Ke Buena national grupera format.

== History ==
XESE-AM 1560 received its concession on October 16, 1970. It was owned by Manuel Rodríguez Escoffie and authorized as a daytimer with 5 kilowatts (though it actually operated with 250 watts). The station was sold to the current concessionaire in 1994.

In 2011, XESE was cleared to migrate to FM as XHESE-FM 96.7; it then moved its FM transmitter again in 2015.
