= PM2FGD =

South Jakarta, Jakarta Special Capital Region; Indonesia
- Broadcast area: Jabodetabek (Greater Jakarta) and surrounding regencies.
- Frequency: 96.7 FM
- Branding: 96.7 Hitz FM (spelled ninety six point seven or sembilan enam koma tujuh (Indonesian meaning ninety six comma seven since decimal separator is a comma in Indonesian)

Programming
- Languages: Indonesian, English
- Format: Contemporary hit radio

Ownership
- Owner: Indika Group (2014–2018); Indika Multimedia (2018–2022); Ikatan Motor Indonesia (2022–present)
- Sister stations: 91.6 Indika FM (2000–2022)

History
- First air date: as Radio A: 1993, as Hitz FM: 24 November 2014, first iteration of Hitz FM: April 2018, 96.7 FM 2022
- Last air date: 28 April 2017

Technical information
- ERP: 10 kW or less?

Links
- Website: http://967hitz.fm

PM2FGD (96.7 FM), former on-air name 96.7 Hitz FM, is a defunct radio station in Jakarta. Since April 2018, this station is reportedly on air with low power and using 96.7 Hitz FM station ID both in English and Indonesian spelling.

== History ==
This station was formerly Radio A, aimed to family audience. Radio A was sometimes known as business radio, just like 95.9 Smart FM and Brava Radio due to business program. However, the music played in Radio A resembles what is played in adult contemporary radio. In July 2014, Radio A ceased operation and leased the channel to Indika Group, owner of Indika FM and free-to-air TV station NET. After last day of Radio A, the channel reformatted into Top 40.

== Defunct ==
This station's last air was on 27 April 2017. Starts from 28 April, 96.7 FM played automated music without any DJ talks, station ID, and even national anthem Indonesia Raya. About July 2017, this station's power diminished and eventually shut down, so a scan from 96.3 FM would jump directly to 97.1 FM when there was no pirate or suburban stations. Hitz FM retained its live streaming. In December 2017, Hitz FM and Indika FM stated that the radio will return as soon as possible. In April 2018, 96.7 FM resumed its broadcasting with "96.7 Hitz FM" name, although Indika Group has not announced the exact relaunch date.
