= KXRY =

Community radio station in Portland, Oregon

- Portland, Oregon; United States
- Broadcast area: Portland, Oregon
- Frequency: 91.1 MHz
- Branding: XRAY.fm

Programming
- Format: Community radio

Ownership
- Owner: Cascade Educational Broadcast Service

History
- First air date: May 14, 1958 (as KRRC at 89.3)
- Former call signs: KRRC (1958–2013)
- Former frequencies: 89.3 MHz (1958–1981); 107.5 MHz (1981-1990?); 104.1 MHz (1990?-2001?); 97.9 MHz (2001?-2011)
- Call sign meaning: K X-RAY

Technical information
- Licensing authority: FCC
- Facility ID: 66303
- Class: D
- ERP: 90 watts
- HAAT: -20 meters
- Transmitter coordinates: 45°31′01″N 122°39′37″W
- Translators: (91.7 MHz) K219KU (Nehalem); 107.1 K296FT (West Haven)
- Repeater: 89.9-3 KQAC-HD3

Links
- Public license information: Public file; LMS
- Website: xray.fm

KXRY (91.1 FM) is a non-commercial class D radio station in Portland, Oregon, United States, operating under the name XRAY.fm. It is a mixed-format progressive, independent radio station which broadcasts progressive talk radio, cultural programs, and music of a wide variety of genres played by its disc jockeys. Its broadcast license is owned by Cascade Educational Broadcast Service. KXRY streams online at xray.fm.

As of August 28, 2014, KXRY began simulcasting on translator K296FT 107.1 FM. From June 15, 2016 through the end of 2020, KXRY would also simulcast on KQAC's HD3 subchannel. Beginning in July 2022, the station expanded to parts of the Oregon Coast with a translator on 91.7 FM in Nehalem, OR.

== History of the Reed College Radio Club ==
The Reed College Radio Club was founded in 1954 by a group of students with the goal of pursuing "the technical and programming aspects of radio broadcasting." The club was one of the most popular on campus, and launched KRCB-AM in October 1955, at 660 AM.

Reed students financed the station, and physics students built some of the equipment, including a 40-watt transmitter. The station used a system that transmitted the signal through area power lines, eliminating the need for antennae. The station carried programming atypical of radio in the area from its earliest days, as well as programming tied in with classes and campus activities.

The station moved to 89.3 FM on May 14, 1958, and became KRRC. When classes began the next fall, the station's inaugural broadcast featured messages from U.S. Senator Wayne Morse and other prominent Oregonians.

KRRC encountered numerous technical problems over the years, often dropping off the air, and its continued existence was sometimes doubted. In 1981 it moved to 107.5 FM. The station's signal was barely audible outside the Reed campus.

In the 1980s and '90s, college radio stations across the country had a heavy influence on the music industry, promoting "alternative rock" bands like R.E.M. and The Pixies; but KRRC took a more maverick approach, playing a wider variety of music.

In 1992 the station petitioned the Federal Communications Commission for permission to locate its transmitter on the KGON tower in the West Hills, to get a better range from its weak signal, but the request was declined. By 1994, the station was using a 10-watt transmitter, and its operating budget for one semester was $6,000. This station now airs online at krrc.fm.

In the early 2000s, a Christian radio station from Tillamook moved to Portland and took over the 104.1 frequency. Between 2000 and 2011, the station broadcast at 97.9 FM. A network stream of programming is available for those on the campus network.

Like the Quest, the school newspaper, KRRC was run entirely by students, although its early days involved cooperation among students, faculty, and staff.

In November 2011, KRRC ceased broadcasting at 97.9 FM and moved to an online-only format.

== XRAY.FM ==
On November 9, 2012, Portland progressive talk radio station KPOJ changed to a sports talk format. BlueOregon founder Kari Chisholm launched a petition to continue progressive talk radio in Portland.

In 2012, Cascade Educational Broadcast Service formed a board of directors and entered into a Local Management Agreement with Common Frequency, LLC, who had received the station from Reed College that year, to broadcast on KRRC. Common Frequency arranged to move the signal to 91.1 FM, thereby achieving better coverage of Portland. (By 2015, the frequency 107.1 had been added.)

The original intention of the group behind Cascade Educational Broadcast Service was to found an all-music station that focused on local DJs. On March 11, 2013, the station changed its call sign to KXRY. The new call sign invoked Portland's iconic X-Ray Cafe, a 1990s community music venue, and while there was no formal affiliation, the cafe's founders were supportive of the launch of the new radio station. A fundraiser held in June 2013 featured performers who had come up at the X-Ray Cafe.

An October 2013 announcement published on the blog BlueOregon noted that the previous demise of KPOJ, a local progressive talk station, had led to a popular effort to continue host Carl Wolfson's show, initially online, and later on KXRY. Nationally syndicated Thom Hartmann, also a KPOJ alumnus, was also part of the launch of progressive talk programming on the station.

KXRY launched a crowdfunding campaign on the website Kickstarter on December 16, 2013, with the goal of raising $40,000 to fund the launch of the station. The campaign saw unexpected success and reached over $100,000 during its month-long funding period.

On March 15, 2014, KXRY began broadcasting a full schedule of programming under the name XRAY.fm. The initial program included talk and music, and hosts Jefferson Smith and Adam Klugman joined the lineup. KXRY started broadcasts from a studio on SE 8th and Main Street in Portland, Oregon, and then built and moved into a new studio on N Killingsworth and N Albina.

As of 2017, Smith, a founder of the station, held the position of executive director, but intended to step down. XRAY.FM had an affiliation with the fledgling Vancouver, Washington station KXRW-LP and a role in the founding of KNUM-LP, also known as "The Numberz," a low-power FM station dedicated to Black music.

Effective June 7, 2018, Common Frequency sold KXRY 91.1 FM's license assets to Cascade Educational Broadcast Service (D/B/A XRAY.FM) for $16,000.

Early in the 2020 COVID-19 outbreak, XRAY.FM was noted as one of the few hubs of local music culture in Portland.

In late 2020, several XRAY.FM staffers went public with allegations of unprofessional behavior of then executive director, Jefferson Smith. On March 5, 2022, XRAY’s Board of Directors confirmed that they had severed ties with Smith. As of July 2021, the station has pivoted to cooperative management from a single executive model, with a group of longtime staff members leading as a collective as part of several changes approved by XRAY's Board of Directors.
