= WBNQ =

Coordinates: 40.450°N 89.012°W

- Bloomington, Illinois; United States
- Broadcast area: Bloomington-Normal
- Frequency: 101.5 MHz
- Branding: 101-5 WBNQ

Programming
- Format: Top 40 (CHR)
- Affiliations: Premiere Networks; Westwood One

Ownership
- Owner: Cumulus Media; (Cumulus Licensing LLC)
- Sister stations: WBWN; WJBC; WJEZ

History
- First air date: 1947 (as WJBC-FM)
- Former call signs: WJBC-FM (1947–1965)
- Call sign meaning: "We're Bloomington Normal Quality"

Technical information
- Licensing authority: FCC
- Facility ID: 68588
- Class: B
- ERP: 50,000 watts
- HAAT: 142 meters (466 ft)

Links
- Public license information: Public file; LMS
- Webcast: Listen live
- Website: www.wbnq.com

WBNQ (101.5 FM) is the most powerful FM radio station in McLean County, Illinois, United States, broadcasting on at 50,000 watts of effective radiated power. It has had a contemporary hit radio music format since 1975.

== History ==
WBNQ first signed on the air as WJBC-FM in 1947. It was the practice among the early FM stations to simply add FM to the "sister" AM call letters and simulcast programming. After the call letter change to WBNQ in the 1960s, the station aired a home-grown easy listening/beautiful music automated format recorded at the old studio site above the Castle Theater in downtown Bloomington. In August 1972 WBNQ became an oldies station using the Draper-Blore Olde Golde syndicated format, then changed to the Drake-Chenault Solid Gold format in 1974 and evolved Top 40 using Drake-Chenault's XT-40 format in late spring 1975. In the spring 1976 Arbitron, using Drake-Chenault's XT-40 format, WBNQ attained its highest ever 12+ share of 24.3%, making it one of the highest-rated FM stations in the U.S. at that time. In 1976 Denny Adkins, the operations director of WBNQ, joined Drake-Chenault as a programming consultant working with their client stations on format presentation, promotion and community involvement. Adkins rose through the ranks at Drake-Chenault, becoming president in 1985.

While WBNQ is reportedly an acronym for "We're Bloomington Normal Quality", the slogan was never used after the format change in 1972. In the early 1980s, WBNQ became a "live" operation with a contemporary hit radio station, a format that remains today. WBNQ began airing Casey Kasem's American Top 40 during the XT-40 era and continued to do so through the 1980s, while former America Top 40 station WIHN began airing Rick Dees Weekly Top 40.

WBNQ enjoyed #1 ratings in 2000 and had a run of consecutive number one ratings from 2001 to 2004. Despite increased competition in 2005 from WRPW which was then operating as a rhythmic, but has since changed to news/talk, WBNQ has remained a top rated station with #1 or #2 12+ Arbitron rankings. Currently, it is #1 overall in the Bloomington-Normal market.

On April 30, 2012, Townsquare Media announced the sale of its Bloomington-Normal radio cluster, which includes WBNQ, to Cumulus Media. The assignment of the station's license to Cumulus was consummated on July 31, 2012.
