= XHPAZ-FM =

Radio station in La Paz, Baja California Sur

- La Paz, Baja California Sur; Mexico
- Broadcast area: La Paz, BCS
- Frequency: 96.7 FM
- Branding: Super Stereo

Programming
- Format: Adult contemporary

Ownership
- Owner: Promomedios California; (Raúl Aréchiga Espinoza)

History
- First air date: March 4, 1980 (concession)
- Call sign meaning: XH (La) PAZ

Technical information
- Licensing authority: CRT
- Class: B1
- ERP: 9.77 kW
- HAAT: 103.1 m (338 ft)

Links
- Website: www.superstereo96.com/jp.html

XHPAZ-FM is a radio station in La Paz, Baja California Sur.
