= Growmark =

Agricultural cooperative in the U.S. and Canada

Growmark, Inc.
- Company type: agricultural supply cooperative
- Industry: Agriculture
- Predecessor: FS Services and Illinois Grain
- Founded: 1927
- Headquarters: Bloomington, Illinois, United States
- Website: www.growmark.com

Growmark, Inc. (stylized as GROWMARK), is a regional agricultural supply cooperative operating in more than 40 states and one operation in Ontario, Canada. Its local member cooperatives commonly use the trademark FS.

Growmark ranks 74th on the ICA Global 300 2008 list of mutuals and cooperatives (ranked by revenue).

== History ==
The organization now known as Growmark started in 1927 when nine of the local agricultural supply cooperatives in Illinois, which had started early in the 1920s, formed Illinois Farm Supply Company.

In 1955, the company adopted the FS trademark, which has remained in use by its member cooperatives since then. In the 1960s, the company moved from Chicago to Bloomington, Illinois, merged with Farm Bureau Service Company of Iowa to form FS Services, Inc., then merged Wisconsin Farmco Service Cooperative and Producers Seed Company into itself as well.

FS Services and Illinois Grain Corporation merged in 1980 to form Growmark.

Growmark gained the 37 member cooperatives in Ontario when it acquired United Co-operatives of Ontario in 1994.

It entered the northeastern U.S. market in 2002 by purchasing Agway's seed and agronomy businesses, including Seedway.

FAST STOP logo

Growmark cooperative members also operate the FAST STOP regional chain of convenience stores and fueling sites. The retail emphasis evolved due to reduced farmer fuel usage due to adoption of no-till and minimum-till farming methods that require fewer trips over crop fields.
