= WMOD =

Radio station in Bolivar, Tennessee

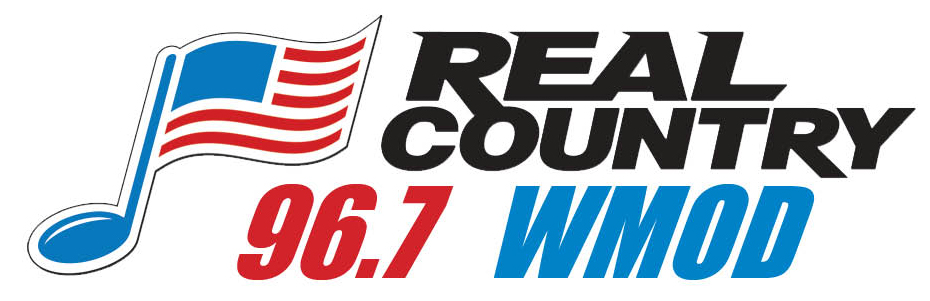
- Bolivar, Tennessee; United States
- Frequency: 96.7 MHz
- Branding: Real Country

Programming
- Format: Country
- Affiliations: Westwood One; TN Radio Network

Ownership
- Owner: WMOD, Inc.

History
- Former call signs: WQKZ (1983–1985); WQKZ-FM (1985–1988)

Technical information
- Licensing authority: FCC
- Facility ID: 71647
- Class: A
- ERP: 3,000 watts
- HAAT: 91.0 meters (298.6 ft)
- Transmitter coordinates: 35°15′0.00″N 88°53′28.00″W

Links
- Public license information: Public file; LMS
- Website: wmodradio.com

WMOD (96.7 FM, "Real Country") is a radio station broadcasting a country music format. Licensed to Bolivar, Tennessee, United States, the station is currently owned by WMOD, Inc. and features programming from Westwood One. WMOD broadcasts more than 150 sporting events involving Hardeman County teams each year, doing Bolivar Central High School and Middleton High School athletics, as well as middle school sports, and Dixie Youth and Dizzy Dean baseball. WMOD is live each day at noon for County Journal Live, which is a variety show with swap shop and a guest.
