= WZPH-LP =

Radio station in Dade City, Florida

WZPH
- Dade City, Florida; United States
- Broadcast area: Eastern Pasco County, Florida
- Frequency: 96.7 MHz
- Branding: The Zephyr

Programming
- Format: Oldies

Ownership
- Owner: Doc Thayer; (Pasco County Educational Corporation)

History
- First air date: March 5, 2005
- Former call signs: WRCP-LP (2002–2003)
- Call sign meaning: ZePHyrhills

Technical information
- Licensing authority: FCC
- Facility ID: 133204
- Class: L1
- ERP: 100 watts
- HAAT: 26.0 meters
- Transmitter coordinates: 28°12′52″N 82°13′34″W

Links
- Public license information: Public file; LMS
- Webcast: WZPH-LP Webstream
- Website: WZPH Online

WZPH (96.7 FM, "The Zephyr") is a low-power radio station broadcasting an oldies format. Licensed to Dade City, Florida, United States, and serving Zephyrhills and Dade City, Florida, the station is owned by Doctor Thayer.
