= WVNW =

Coordinates: 40.586°N 77.694°W

- Burnham, Pennsylvania; United States
- Broadcast area: Lewistown, Pennsylvania; Mifflintown, Pennsylvania
- Frequency: 96.7 MHz
- Branding: Star Country 96.7

Programming
- Format: Country

Ownership
- Owner: WVNW, Inc.

Technical information
- Licensing authority: FCC
- Facility ID: 74172
- Class: A
- ERP: 450 watts
- HAAT: 259 meters

Links
- Public license information: Public file; LMS
- Website: star967.com

WVNW is a country music formatted radio station in the Lewistown, Pennsylvania market. The station is owned by WVNW, Inc.

== Personalities ==
Current air personalities include:

- 'Insane' Erik Lane (Mornings - 6am until 10am)
- Kenzie McCarter (Middays - 10am until 3pm)
- Brett Thomas (Afternoons - 3pm until 7pm)
- Nights with Elaina (syndicated Evenings/Overnights)
- 'Cool Hand' Luke (Saturday 1-4 PM)
