= WZIM =

Coordinates: 40.575°N 88.838°W

Lexington, Illinois; United States
- Broadcast area: Bloomington-Normal
- Frequency: 99.5 MHz (HD Radio)
- Branding: Magic 99.5

Programming
- Format: Adult contemporary

Ownership
- Owner: Pilot Media, LLC
- Operator: Zimmer Media Group
- Sister stations: WRPW, WIBL

History
- First air date: 2001 (as WCSO)
- Former call signs: WMOS (5/2001-6/2001, CP); WCSO (6/2001-7/2001); WDQZ (2001-2010)
- Call sign meaning: For Zimmer Media Group CEO Jerry Zimmer

Technical information
- Licensing authority: FCC
- Facility ID: 88354
- Class: A
- ERP: 6,000 watts
- HAAT: 100 meters (330 ft)

Links
- Public license information: Public file; LMS
- Webcast: Listen Live
- Website: magic995fm.com

WZIM (99.5 FM) is a commercial radio station licensed to Lexington, Illinois, and serving the Bloomington-Normal radio market, carrying an adult contemporary format of music.

== History ==
The station signed on in late 2001 as WCSO, and the call letters were soon changed to WDQZ. It was a classic rock simulcast with WDQX in Peoria known as 99.5 and 102.3 The Eagle. In December 2005 WDQX was sold, and the simulcast with WDQZ was split. Following the sale to Great Plains Media in June of 2007, the station evolved into a more straight-ahead classic rock station. In September 2009, WDQZ stunted as an all-TV-themed station for a day and a half. On September 18, 2009, at noon, WDQZ changed back to a classic hits format, and switched to the new calls of WZIM on August 17, 2010.

On April 5, 2012, WZIM changed its format from classic hits to sports, branded as "The Ticket". The move meant that Bloomington-Normal had an all-sports radio station for the first time. Immediately after announcing the switch, 99.5 The Ticket became the B-N affiliate for the Chicago Cubs, taking over from WJEZ. WZIM was also the Bloomington-Normal affiliate for the Chicago White Sox, although the station gave first priority to the Cubs. The Ticket also aired Indianapolis Colts games in the fall. WJBC airs nearly all local sports teams.

On November 13, 2013, at 10 am, WZIM dropped its sports format and began stunting with automated classic rock songs. On November 15 at noon, it changed its format to AC as Magic 99.5, with the slogan, "80s, 90s, And Now!" and began promoting itself as the new home in Bloomington for the John Tesh Radio Show, which would move to its traditional evening berth when the station acquired the rights to Kidd Kraddick in the Morning.
