= WCMJ =

Coordinates: 40.040°N 81.647°W

- Cambridge, Ohio; United States
- Frequency: 96.7 MHz
- Branding: 96FM

Programming
- Format: Hot Adult Contemporary

Ownership
- Owner: AVC Communications, Inc.

History
- First air date: 1964

Technical information
- Licensing authority: FCC
- Facility ID: 3362
- Class: A
- ERP: 2,300 watts
- HAAT: 112 meters

Links
- Public license information: Public file; LMS
- Webcast: Listen Live
- Website: WCMJ Online

WCMJ (96.7 FM) is a Hot Adult Contemporary radio station in Cambridge, Ohio, owned locally by AVC Communications, Inc. The station broadcasts with a power of 2,300 Watts and is simply known as "96FM" to listeners. 96FM has been using the call sign WCMJ since May 1, 1984.
