= Carrizalillo, Guerrero =

City in Guerrero, Mexico

Coordinates: 16.6083°N 98.7637°W

Carrizalillo is a city in the state of Guerrero, Mexico. The height over sea level of Carrizalillo is 1,520 m (4,990 ft), located in the Municipality of Juchitán, Guerrero. In The region of the Costa Chica, one of the 7 regions of the state of Guerrero. With a population of about 1,000, it is located on the road of Acapulco-Salina Cruz, 113.63 km (70.61 mi) away from Acapulco.
