= WERA-LP =

- Arlington, Virginia; United States
- Broadcast area: Arlington, Virginia; Alexandria, Virginia; Washington, D.C.
- Frequency: 96.7 MHz
- Branding: WERA 96.7

Programming
- Format: Community radio

Ownership
- Owner: Radio Arlington

History
- First air date: December 6, 2015
- Call sign meaning: We Are ("R") Arlington

Technical information
- Licensing authority: FCC
- Facility ID: 195167
- Class: L1
- ERP: 20 watts
- HAAT: 66 meters (217 ft)
- Transmitter coordinates: 38°53′23.60″N 77°5′12.80″W

Links
- Public license information: LMS
- Website: https://www.radioarlington.org

WERA-LP is a community radio-formatted broadcast radio station licensed to Arlington, Virginia, serving Arlington and Alexandria in Virginia and Washington, D.C. WERA-LP is owned and operated by Radio Arlington.

== History ==
Arlington Independent Media (AIM) was founded in 1982, and received funding from the Arlington County government to operate its public-access television channels since that time. It also provided studio space, equipment, and training for local residents interested in audio and video production.

WERA-LP went on the air at 6 p.m. on December 6, 2015. The station carried free-form programming typical of college and community radio, staffed by volunteer disc jockeys who played what they wished. Members of Arlington Independent Media were allowed to host and create their own shows, live or recorded, provided they took the appropriate classes and follow certain guidelines.

=== Arlington Independent Media financial crisis and silence ===
Until 2018, AIM's agreement with the county called for it to receive one percent of revenue from taxes charged on cable subscriptions to fund operating expenses, eligibility to apply for public, educational, and government access (PEG) funds for capital expenses (also derived from a portion of cable-subscription taxes), and a studio in Clarendon provided for free by Comcast. It also received support grants directly from the county government. In 2016, the County renegotiated the franchise agreement with Comcast, removing the dedicated funding, and additionally required AIM to begin paying rent for its studio. Community protests led to the county government reversing proposed cuts to its support. These funding cuts, combined with dwindling cable subscriptions reducing the pool of PEG funds – which is shared with the county's own cable channel and fiber-optic network – led to the nonprofit consistently running an operational deficit.

In December 2023, WERA-LP began playing a loop of lofi hip-hop music because its studio-transmitter link failed. The station began efforts to move the studio to its county-owned transmitter site in Court House, but was once again held up by dependence on financial support from the county. In March 2024, a group of AIM members, including former board members, wrote an open letter accusing the current board and CEO Whytni Kernodle of gross financial mismanagement, as well as improperly spending public funds on payroll and office space. Arlington County began an audit of AIM's finances and accounting procedures and froze its access to any public funding. AIM was essentially forced to suspend operations and laid off its entire paid staff. Kernodle resigned as CEO but denied any misconduct in an interview with the Washington City Paper.

WERA-LP's signal and stream were concurrently shut off at 3:30 p.m. on March 22, 2024.

The audit of AIM concluded in the fall of 2024, and found much of AIM's spending was either poorly documented or could not be substantiated at all. Auditors were unable to determine how $536,210 of $1.05 million in PEG funds were spent, and concluded some or all of it was illegally spent on operating costs. Additionally, over $400,000 of operational spending was improperly documented. The audit found that 31 percent of AIM's overall expenditures went to 49 consultants, though the organization was only able to provide contracts for 12 of them. The audit also criticized other deficient financial practices, including a lack of annual reporting and placing public and non-public funds in the same bank account in violation of its agreement with the county. The report also faulted Arlington County for a lack of oversight of AIM's spending practices. The entire board of AIM was replaced with volunteers as a result. The case was referred to an outside special counsel, who declined to file criminal charges. Arlington County subsequently allowed AIM back into its transmitter space to restart operations of WERA-LP. On March 7, 2025, WERA-LP resumed broadcasting the same automated lo-fi music feed in order to preserve its license.

WERA-LP went silent again on July 28, 2025, and local media reported its wera.fm domain name had expired and Arlington Independent Media's main website also went offline. Nearly the entire board of directors had resigned in the interim. One of the two remaining board members was unable to answer when asked why the station and website were offline. A letter from one of the departing members indicated there were now efforts to find another organization to take over the license, but that "discussions are ongoing, and nothing is imminent." In late August, Arlington County seized all of AIM's property in an attempt to recover roughly $70,000 of unpaid taxes and rent via auction. In a filing with the FCC, station representatives claimed Arlington County locked them out of the radio transmission room without warning, called the tax delinquency "alleged", and stated it would reacquire the equipment necessary for broadcasting and construct the station elsewhere. County Board Chair Takis Karatonis stated in a September 2025 public hearing that there was nothing the county could do to save AIM if it was unable to repay its debt.

In a January 22, 2026 Audit Committee meeting, County Manager Mark Schwartz stated that the equipment auction brought proceeds of $59,000 and he would be ending efforts to recoup either the remaining delinquent taxes and rent or the undocumented and improperly spent public funding.

In a March 19 filing with the FCC, AIM's legal consultant stated there had been "substantial progress" in returning WERA-LP to the air. WERA-LP had until July 29, 2026 at 12:01 a.m. to resume operations or its license would be forfeited. On April 7, AIM filed to transfer the license and broadcasting equipment to a newly formed nonprofit, Radio Arlington, for no consideration. The transfer was approved by the FCC on May 12 and closed on May 26.

=== Return to air ===
On July 22, six days before the deadline, Radio Arlington applied to once again return WERA-LP to the air. The filing indicated that the dispute regarding access to the county-controlled part of the transmission building continued, and so it requested special temporary authority to broadcast from an antenna located elsewhere on the building's roof until the matter is resolved. In light of the deadline, the FCC granted the application later in the day. Arlington County released a statement that made no mention of a dispute with Radio Arlington, only that it had sent its contractor to work inside the country-controlled space without providing sufficient information about the proposed work.

After a second STA filing to reduce power to 6 watts, WERA-LP resumed operations on the last possible day, July 28, with a different loop of instrumental music.

On October 26, WERA-LP resumed full-power operation at 20 watts. It is broadcasting automated music and public-affairs programming from Public Radio Exchange until a base of volunteer staff is re-established. Unlike Arlington Independent Media, Radio Arlington plans to be entirely volunteer-run.

== See also ==
- List of community radio stations in the United States
