= WCXO =

- Carlyle, Illinois; United States
- Frequency: 96.7 MHz
- Branding: Max 96.7 FM

Programming
- Format: Variety hits
- Affiliations: ABC News Radio

Ownership
- Owner: Clinton County Broadcasting

History
- First air date: 1999

Technical information
- Licensing authority: FCC
- Facility ID: 12052
- Class: A
- ERP: 2,100 watts
- HAAT: 158 meters (518 ft)
- Transmitter coordinates: 38°38′24.17427″N 89°22′40.28551″W

Links
- Public license information: Public file; LMS
- Webcast: Listen live
- Website: max967.com

WCXO (96.7 FM) is a radio station licensed to Carlyle, Illinois, United States. The station is currently owned by Clinton County Broadcasting.
