= WNKX-FM =

- Centerville, Tennessee; United States
- Frequency: 96.7 MHz
- Branding: Country KiX96

Programming
- Format: Country

Ownership
- Owner: William Nunley; (Hickman Digital Media, Inc.)

History
- Former call signs: WCQT (1986–1989); WHLP-FM (1989–1991)

Technical information
- Licensing authority: FCC
- Facility ID: 27138
- Class: A
- ERP: 6,000 watts
- HAAT: 91.0 meters (298.6 ft)
- Transmitter coordinates: 35°49′39.00″N 87°34′2.00″W

Links
- Public license information: Public file; LMS
- Webcast: Listen Live
- Website: wnkxlive.com

WNKX-FM (96.7 FM, "Country KiX96") is a radio station broadcasting a country music format. Licensed to Centerville, Tennessee, United States, the station is currently owned by William Nunley, through licensee Hickman Digital Media, Inc.
