= Peñasquito Mine =

Silver mine in Coahuila, Mexico

Coordinates: 24°39′18.27″N 101°41′49.455″W

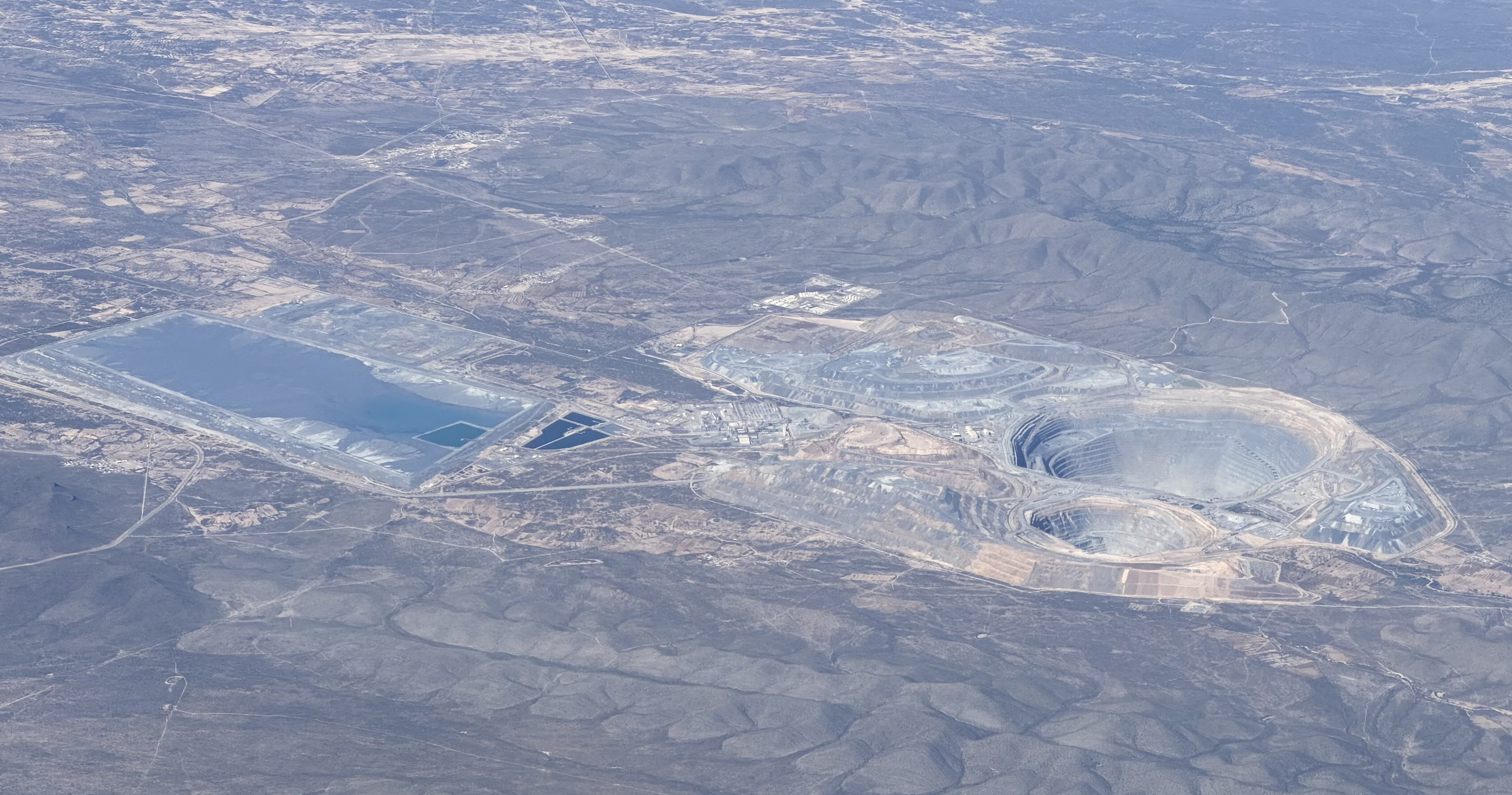
Aerial view of Peñasquito Mine

The Peñasquito Polymetallic Mine is the fifth largest silver mine in the world and the second largest in Mexico. It is located in north-eastern corner of the State of Zacatecas and is wholly owned by Newmont. It is an open pit operation which began commercial operations in March 2010, but still managed to produce 13,952,600 ounces of silver that year. Estimated reserves for the Peñasquito Mine are 17.82 million oz of gold, 1,070.1 million oz of silver, 3,214 tons of lead and 7,098 million tons of zinc.

The mine has its own radio station, XHESP-FM 98.9 "Radio Peñasco".

== Geology ==
The country rock consists of Mesozoic sediments that were deposited in the Basin of Mexico (Mexico Geosyncline). These sediments were intruded by quartz-feldspar porphyries, quartz monzonite porphyries, and other feldspar-phyric intrusives in the late Eocene to the mid-Oligocene, which form sills, dikes, and stocks. The primary ore for the Peñasquito Polymetallic Mine is in two diatreme breccias, named the Peñasco and the Brecha Azul. The mineralization contains gold, silver, lead and zinc. The diatremes flare upward, and are filled with brecciated country rock and intrusions. The rock surrounding the diatremes contain disseminated galena, sphalerite and sulfosalts within phyllic (sericite–pyrite–quartz) and proplytic (chlorite–epidote–pyrite) hydrothermal alteration envelopes. Where the diatremes intersect limestone units manto deposits of ore mineralization occur.

== History ==
The history of exploration of the Peñasquito project began in 1992 when Kencott recognized the area's potential for a significant mineral deposit and began exploration. The exploration was suspended in 1997 but resumed in 2002 when Western Silver took over. A significant polymetallic deposit was discovered in 2006 and construction of the mine began in 2007, the first concentrates were produced in October 2009, and commercial production began in 2010. In 2006, Western Silver sold the property to Glamis Gold Ltd. for $1.2 billion in exchange for Glamis stock. Goldcorp became the owner of the mine in 2006 when it purchased Glamis. In 2019, Newmont acquired Goldcorp, obtaining full ownership interest in Peñasquito, which consists of the Peñasco and Chile Colorado open pit mines.

== 2017 Protest ==
A week-long protest disrupted operations at the Peñasquito mine during the first week of October 2017. Goldcorp had been forced to "announce a temporary suspension of operations due to a blockade by truck drivers protesting a loss of contracts at the country’s biggest gold deposit."
