= KWRA-LP =

- Waco, Texas; United States
- Frequency: 96.7 MHz

Programming
- Format: Religious

Ownership
- Owner: Amistad Baptist Church

Technical information
- Licensing authority: FCC
- Facility ID: 135565
- Class: L1
- ERP: 80 watts
- HAAT: 33.5 meters
- Transmitter coordinates: 31°33′4.00″N 97°11′24.00″W

Links
- Public license information: LMS
- Website: amistadwaco.org/es/radio

KWRA-LP (96.7 FM) is a radio station broadcasting a religious radio format. Licensed to Waco, Texas, United States. The station is currently owned by Amistad Baptist Church.
