= Access Humboldt =

KZZH-LP
- Eureka, California; United States
- Broadcast area: Humboldt County
- Frequency: 96.7 MHz
- Branding: KZZH-LP 96.7

Programming
- Format: Community radio

Ownership
- Owner: Access Humboldt

History
- First air date: August 22, 2016

Technical information
- Licensing authority: FCC
- Facility ID: 195765
- Class: L1
- ERP: 100 watts
- HAAT: −29 meters (−95 ft)
- Transmitter coordinates: 40°47′47.6″N 124°9′55.7″W

Links
- Public license information: LMS
- Webcast: Listen live
- Website: kzzh.accesshumboldt.net

Access Humboldt is a non-profit, community media organization formed in April 2006. It is a provider of Public-access television and FM Radio, operating from Humboldt County, California. It was initially formed to manage local cable franchise benefits on behalf of the County of Humboldt, California and the Cities of Eureka, Arcata, Fortuna, Rio Dell, Ferndale and Blue Lake. The community media center is based at the College of the Redwoods campus in Eureka, California. Access Humboldt seeks to deliver local voices via community media and is an active advocate in issues of community debate.

In 2016 the station received an operating license from the Federal Communications Commission for a community radio station KZZH-LP.

== Public access TV ==
Access Humboldt's develops its own public access programming and is broadcast on the following channels:

- Educational programming, Suddenlink Communications - EDUC8
- Live and pre-recorded local government up to national government programming, Suddenlink Communications - CIVIC10
- Locally focused and innovative story telling, Suddenlink Communications - AH11
- Local and non-local programming, Suddenlink Communications - AH12
- Civic programming, Wave Broadband channel 7 in Southern Humboldt County

It also provides an online archive for its users.

== Advocacy ==
The station has been an active advocate for its community and audience, and has taken a position in a number of public debates, including:

- net neutrality
- concentration of media ownership.
- capping of the lifeline budget and budget reductions in other services.
- affordable access to high-speed internet

== KZZH-LP 96.7 FM ==
Access Humboldt includes its FCC-licensed and commercial-free FM radio broadcast. In addition to its FM radio broadcast, KZZH-LP provides its facility and equipment for community use in return for an annual subscription. Facilities include a studio equipped with green screen, stage platforms, lighting, cameras, control room and editing suite.
