= KIIC =

Radio station in Albia–Ottumwa, Iowa

- Albia, Iowa; United States
- Broadcast area: Ottumwa, Iowa
- Frequencies: 96.7 (MHz) (HD Radio)
- Branding: Thunder Country 96.7

Programming
- Format: Classic Country

Ownership
- Owner: Waveguide Communications Inc.

Technical information
- Licensing authority: FCC
- Facility ID: 25745
- Class: C3
- ERP: 10,000 watts
- HAAT: 155 m (509 ft)
- Transmitter coordinates: 41°01′47″N 92°47′12″W

Links
- Public license information: Public file; LMS
- Webcast: Listen LIVE!
- Website: www.kiicradio.com

KIIC (96.7 FM) is a commercial radio station that serves 19 counties in Southern Iowa. The station broadcasts a Real Country format. KIIC is licensed to Waveguide Communications Inc which is owned by Joe Milledge.

The station was originally licensed as KLBA-FM on November 18, 1992, but changed callsigns to KIIC on August 7, 2007.

The transmitter and broadcast tower are located 3 miles east of Albia.

KIIC specializes in local, regional and national sports, local news and weather - with an emphasis on Agriculture. KIIC is also known for its local events like BaconTown, The Farm Show, and Ottumwa's Bridgefest.
