= Kari Chisholm =

American political consultant

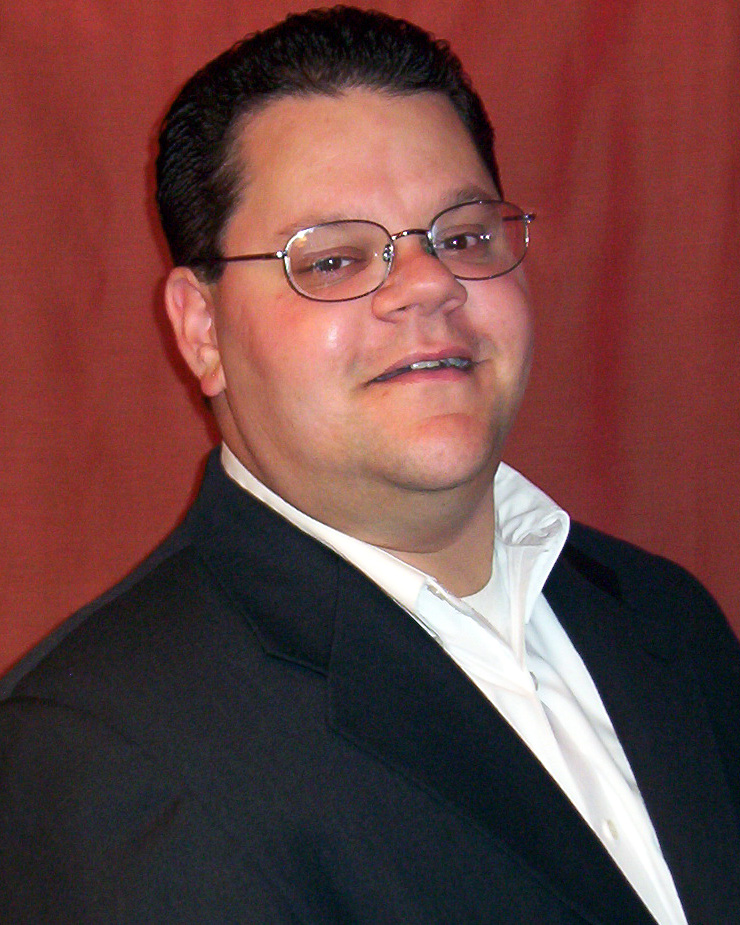
- Born: July 2, 1973 (age 53)
- Education: University of Southern California (BA)
- Known for: Founder of BlueOregon
- Political party: Democratic
- Spouse: Carrie Wynkoop
- Children: 1

Kari Chisholm (born July 2, 1973) is an American political consultant and sports commentator based in Portland, Oregon. He became known for commentary on the Heisman Trophy, and his now-defunct site StiffArmTrophy.com correctly predicted the winner of the trophy every year from 2002 to 2012. He is the co-founder and publisher of BlueOregon, a defunct blog.

== Career ==
=== Political consultancy and BlueOregon ===
In 2004, Chisholm, Jeff Alworth, and Jesse Cornett co-founded BlueOregon, a progressive blog that covered the politics of the U.S. state of Oregon. Chisholm was one of the site's three main editors and was described as the "den mother of the political blog" by the Willamette Week. Chisholm stated that he and other tech-savvy activists wanted smaller regional political blogs like BlueOregon to play as a prominent a role at the state level as large blogs already did at the national level.

By 2006 the site was the top-read Oregon political blog, with 3,000 to 4,000 readers a day around election season. An article in The Register-Guard stated that "[b]logs such as Chisholm's have been a place where Democratic activists have been able to find out where and how they can help their party's candidates. [...] And where those willing to get up from their computers can go to make phone calls or go door-knocking on behalf of candidates."

By 2008 the site was generating 9,000 page views a day and editors were credentialed for floor access to the 2008 Democratic National Convention in Denver, Colorado. By 2010, the site featured more than 30 regular contributors, and Chisholm and other editors were regularly quoted in local political stories by The Oregonian, the state's largest newspaper.

During this period of growth for BlueOregon, Chisholm served as a political consultant and operated website development company Mandate Media, which provided digital services to U.S. Senator Ron Wyden and Gov. Ted Kulongoski, and to the campaigns of then-U.S. Senate candidate Jeff Merkley, then-secretary of state candidate Kate Brown, then-congressional candidate Kurt Schrader, and then-Portland mayoral candidate Sam Adams. In 2008, Jake Weigler, a BlueOregon contributor and campaign manager for Senate candidate Steve Novick, published a post on the site alleging that BlueOregon's coverage of the race was biased towards the Merkley campaign and that Chisholm had a clear conflict of interest. "It's pretty transparent that [BlueOregon] is being used as window dressing and as a mouthpiece for the Merkley campaign," Weigler told The Oregonian.

Other campaigns expressed similar complaints about coverage, and reporting in the Willamette Week detailed "ample evidence" that BlueOregon has "posted pieces that portray Chisholm's paying clients favorably." "I'm not a journalist and don't pretend to be," Chisholm later told the paper, "but I work hard to get all voices out there."

Between 2006 and 2011, Chisholm was paid nearly $400,000 by state and local Democratic candidates.

Chisholm last posted on BlueOregon in 2020, and the site has not been updated since.

In 2023 Chisholm was selected to serve on a committee to draft the district lines which would form the geographic basis of Portland's new form of government.

== Personal life ==
He lives in Portland, Oregon with his wife and their son.
