= KKSW =

Radio station in Lawrence, Kansas

- Lawrence, Kansas; United States
- Broadcast area: Lawrence; Topeka; Kansas City
- Frequency: 105.9 MHz
- Branding: 105.9 Kiss FM

Programming
- Format: Contemporary hit radio

Ownership
- Owner: Great Plains Media

History
- First air date: August 20, 1963
- Former call signs: KLWN-FM (1963–1979); KLZR (1979–2012)

Technical information
- Licensing authority: FCC
- Facility ID: 36743
- Class: C1
- ERP: 100,000 watts
- HAAT: 236 meters (774 ft)
- Transmitter coordinates: 39°02′22″N 95°27′00″W

Links
- Public license information: Public file; LMS
- Webcast: Listen live
- Website: 1059kiss.com

KKSW (105.9 FM) is a radio station licensed to Lawrence, Kansas, United States. broadcasting to the Topeka and Kansas City areas. The station offers a contemporary hit radio format. Studios are located on West 6th Street in Lawrence, and its transmitter is located west of Lecompton.

== History ==
=== Early Years: 1963-1972 ===
On August 20, 1963, KLWN-FM first signed on as the FM adjunct of KLWN. Its original purpose was a full-time signal to broadcast weather, sports, and other information, including things like school closings. The FM station was originally run by a tape, at that time the station's most popular programming was University of Kansas or Lawrence High football games.

The station started with technical facilities of 17 kW on 105.9 MHz. From 1963 to 1974, both stations shared the same studio. KLWN-FM essentially simulcast the AM during daylight hours until 1972.

=== Rock: 1972-1980s ===
In 1972, the staff began a separate rock programming that was broadcast in the overnight hours, first after the AM sign-off, and then it was pre-taped and replayed the next day at 3 PM, later noon. On April 1, 1974, an addition to the station allowed the AM to move into a new studio (complete with an interview room) and the FM to have the old one. For several years, "The Music Station 106" was the FM on-air name. Then on July 31, 1979, KLWN-FM received the new calls of KLZR and was authorized to increase power to 100 kW. The new 550-foot tower was completed and the new transmitter was put in use in December.

=== New Wave: 1980s ===
Up through to the mid-1980s, KLZR (sometimes then referred to by on-air disk jockeys as "Lazer Rock") heavily featured a new wave music format, with artists such as Icehouse, Split Enz, Mi-Sex, and The Cure, as well as Elvis Costello, The Tubes, and Joe Jackson.

=== Modern Rock: 1990s ===
During the 1990s, KLZR carried a modern rock format, which was popular on the KU campus and in the college town atmosphere of Lawrence, as well as Kansas City; even garnering a mention in Rolling Stone magazine as one of the top ten "Stations that Didn't Suck" in 1998. The station was independently owned by the Booth family until they sold the station to the Zimmer Radio Group on September 1, 1998. (Zimmer member Jerry Zimmer separated the station from the group in 2005, returning KLZR to a local ownership status under the incorporated name "Great Plains Media").

=== Top 40: 1999-2003 ===
After the sale, KLZR morphed into a top 40 station. Booth wasn't aware of the change before he sold the station, and even told the media that there was no plan on changing formats. Weeks later, the station had shifted to playing boy bands from grunge rock. The change created a blowback from the local fans of the station that enjoyed the independent music choices and lead in the local music community. Groups protested the change, picketing outside the station and in local papers The Kansan and The Journal World, as well as petitions with thousands of signature and shirts with "The New Lazer Sucks" printed on them circled around. The change didn't affect just the community, but also some of the employees that worked hard at creating their unique playlists. The anger peaked one night when two windows were broken, the second one after Booth stated on the air that he hoped it had nothing to do with the change.

=== Hot AC: 2003-2012 ===
In 2003, the station shifted formats again, this time to a hot adult contemporary format, because of low ratings from the earlier format change.

=== Top 40: 2012-present ===
On January 20, 2012, KLZR began stunting with all-Lady Gaga music. Later that day, at 3 p.m., the station re-branded as "105.9 Kiss FM" and returned to a top 40 format. On February 7, 2012, KLZR changed its call letters to KKSW to match the new branding.

On September 13, 2024, Great Plains Media announced it would sell KKSW to Reyes Media Group for $2.25 million. Preparing for the sale, Kansas Jayhawks athletics moved to sister station KMXN. Due to financial disputes, the sale to Reyes was delayed several times. In July 2026, Great Plains withdrew the sale.
