= WHUB =

- Cookeville, Tennessee; United States
- Broadcast area: Cookeville, Tennessee
- Frequency: 1400 kHz
- Branding: 107.7 Grace FM

Programming
- Format: Contemporary Christian music

Ownership
- Owner: Cookeville Communications, LLC
- Sister stations: WGSQ, WKSW, WPTN

History
- First air date: 1940; 86 years ago
- Former call signs: WHUB (1940–2010); WPTN (January–March 2010)
- Call sign meaning: The station's longtime slogan promoted Cookesville as the "Hub of the Upper Cumberland Valley"

Technical information
- Licensing authority: FCC
- Facility ID: 70514
- Class: C
- Power: 1,000 watts unlimited
- Transmitter coordinates: 36°9′48.00″N 85°31′29.00″W
- Translator: 107.7 W299BY (Cookeville)

Links
- Public license information: Public file; LMS
- Webcast: Listen Live
- Website: 1077gracefm.com

WHUB (1400 AM) is a radio station broadcasting a Contemporary Christian music format. Licensed to Cookeville, Tennessee, United States, the station is owned by Cookeville Communications.

The station formerly broadcast a conservative talk radio format until April 18, 2024.
