= WPTN =

- Cookeville, Tennessee; United States
- Broadcast area: Cookeville, Tennessee
- Frequency: 780 kHz
- Branding: 106.1 The Eagle

Programming
- Format: Classic hits

Ownership
- Owner: Cookeville Communications, LLC
- Sister stations: WKSW, WGSQ, WHUB

History
- First air date: 1962
- Former call signs: WPTN (1962-January 2010); WHUB (January–March 2010)

Technical information
- Licensing authority: FCC
- Facility ID: 13820
- Class: D
- Power: 1,000 watts day
- Transmitter coordinates: 36°9′48″N 85°31′29″W
- Translator: 106.1 W291CA (Cookeville)

Links
- Public license information: Public file; LMS
- Webcast: Listen Live
- Website: 1061theeagle.com

WPTN (780 AM, "106.1 The Eagle") is a radio station broadcasting a classic hits format. Licensed to Cookeville, Tennessee, United States, the station serves the Cookeville area. The station is owned by Cookeville Communications, LLC. Because WPTN broadcasts on the same frequency as "clear–channel" station WBBM in Chicago, Illinois, it only broadcasts during the daytime hours and is required to sign off at sunset.

== History ==
WPTN is formerly a Top 40 station for the area in the 1980s. On November 3, 2017, WPTN changed their format from sports to classic hits, still branded as "106.1 The Eagle".
