= XHESP-FM (Zacatecas) =

Radio station in Mazapil, Zacatecas, Mexico

- Mazapil, Zacatecas; Mexico
- Frequency: 98.9 FM
- Branding: Radio Peñasco

Programming
- Format: Full-service (mining)
- Affiliations: Grupo B-15 (news programming)

Ownership
- Owner: Goldcorp; (Estéreo Peñasquito, A.C.)

History
- First air date: July 2011; November 28, 2017 (concession award)
- Former frequencies: 94.9 FM (as a pirate)
- Call sign meaning: EStereo Peñasquito

Technical information
- Licensing authority: CRT
- Class: A
- ERP: 15 watts
- HAAT: 301.1 m (988 ft)
- Transmitter coordinates: 24°40′35.13″N 101°40′52.18″W

XHESP-FM is a radio station on 98.9 FM at the Peñasquito Polymetallic Mine in Mazapil, Zacatecas, Mexico.

== History ==
Radio Peñasco went on the air in July 2011 as a pirate station on 94.9 MHz. On November 28, 2017, the Federal Telecommunications Institute approved the award of this station to serve the mining community of about 800 people. The concession is held by a civil association controlled by the mine's owner, Goldcorp. Radio Peñasco had previously operated as a pirate on 94.9 MHz; the concession moved the station to 98.9.
