= WRPW =

Coordinates: 40.491°N 88.721°W

- Colfax, Illinois; United States
- Broadcast area: Bloomington-Normal
- Frequency: 92.9 MHz
- Branding: Cities Talk FM 92.9

Programming
- Format: Talk radio
- Affiliations: Premiere Networks; Westwood One; Salem Radio Network; Compass Media Networks; Fox News Radio

Ownership
- Owner: Great Plains Media
- Sister stations: WZIM, WIBL

History
- First air date: May 5, 1996; 30 years ago
- Former call signs: WAPU (1996–1998); WSNI (1998–2001)
- Call sign meaning: PoWer (previous format)

Technical information
- Licensing authority: FCC
- Class: A
- ERP: 6,000 watts
- HAAT: 100 meters (330 ft)

Links
- Public license information: Public file; LMS
- Webcast: Listen Live
- Website: cities929.com

WRPW (92.9 MHz) is a commercial FM radio station licensed to Colfax, Illinois, in the Bloomington-Normal radio market. WRPW broadcasts a talk radio format known as "Cities Talk FM 92.9." It is owned by Pilot Media, a subsidiary of Great Plains Media. Great Plains' CEO is Jerry Zimmer, a longtime partner in the Zimmer Radio Group based in Cape Girardeau, Missouri.

WRPW has an effective radiated power (ERP) of 6,000 watts. The transmitter is on North 2850 East Road in Ellsworth, Illinois.

== Programming ==
Weekdays on WRPW begin with a local drive time show, "Conservative Cat with Cat Barker." The rest of the weekday line up is made up of nationally syndicated conservative talk shows: Glenn Beck, Dan Bongino, Sean Hannity, Mark Levin, "Markley, Van Camp and Robbins," Ben Shapiro, Larry Elder and "This Morning, America's First News with Gordon Deal."

Weekends feature shows on politics, home repair, law enforcement, money and health. Weekend syndicated hosts include Gary Sullivan, Joe Pags, Dennis Prager, Bill Handel, Mike Gallagher and Bill Cunningham. Most hours begin with an update from Fox News Radio. The weekend lineup also includes local hosts such as Kevin Phares, David Paul Blumenshine, Ty Smith, and El Donzo and Deez.

== History ==
WRPW made its debut in 1996 as WAPU. Soon after signing on, the call sign was changed to WSNI and the station became adult contemporary station "Sunny 92.9" with a satellite-fed format. In late 2001, call letters were switched to WRPW and the station became a simulcast of 92.3 WZPW in Peoria, Illinois, and the stations together used the name "Power 92".

In 2006, WZPW and WRPW stopped simulcasting after WZPW was sold to Regent Broadcasting, but both retained the same format. The brand name of WRPW was also changed from "Power 92" to "Power 92.9". On August 30, 2007, at 11:30PM the station flipped from Rhythmic CHR to Talk. The station seized the opportunity to pick up popular syndicated shows to compete with heritage news/talker 1230 WJBC's mostly local lineup. WRPW began airing The Rush Limbaugh Show after being dropped by WJBC in March 2007.

Prior to 1996, the call letters WRPW were used on Pace University's low-power college radio station at 630 AM in Pleasantville, New York, home of the Pete and Jim Show.
