= WIHN =

- Normal, Illinois; United States
- Broadcast area: Bloomington-Normal
- Frequency: 96.7 MHz
- Branding: K-Love

Programming
- Format: Active rock
- Affiliations: United Stations Radio Networks; Westwood One

Ownership
- Owner: Educational Media Foundation; (Educational Media Foundation)

History
- First air date: December 21, 1973; 52 years ago
- Call sign meaning: Win

Technical information
- Licensing authority: FCC
- Facility ID: 4617
- Class: A
- ERP: 3,900 watts
- HAAT: 125 meters (410 ft)

Links
- Public license information: Public file; LMS
- Webcast: Listen Live

WIHN (96.7 FM) is a commercial radio station in Normal, Illinois, United States, and serving the Bloomington-Normal radio market. It broadcasts an active rock radio format known as Rock 96.7. It is owned by Elizabeth Neuhoff's Neuhoff Corp., through licensee Neuhoff Media Bloomington, LLC, with studios on Brickyard Drive in Bloomington. On weekday mornings, WIHN carries the nationally syndicated "Bob & Tom Show," based at WFBQ Indianapolis.

== History ==
The station signed on the air Friday, December 21, 1973, from studios located on the second floor of the Castle Theater Building on Washington Street in Bloomington, Illinois. These studios were previously occupied by WJBC/WBNQ until their earlier move to the transmitter site on Greenwood Avenue.

The WIHN transmitter was located at Nord Farm on the West side of Bloomington/Normal. The antenna was side-mounted at the maximum allowable height of 300 feet (91 m) on an already existing communications tower owned by Dr. Stanley Nord with a studio/transmitter link from downtown. The Collins 3 kW transmitter was housed within an enclosure constructed inside one of the farm buildings.

The station was conceived by David S. Wolfenden who formed McLean Communications Corporation for the purpose of applying for the allocated channel 244A (96.7 MHz) at Normal, Illinois. Besides Wolfenden, who became President of the corporation and the station's general manager, other McLean principals included Andrew Rector, Wilbur Winn, William Brady, Bert Jackson and several other local businessmen. Prior to the formation of McLean, a local ministry had briefly pursued the channel and withdrawn.

At the same time as McLean's application, two Chicago individuals had formed a corporation and had applied for 244A as well. Ensuing negotiations over a number of months resulted in this group withdrawing their bid leaving McLean as the sole applicant.

With the idea of a modern, upbeat format in mind, Wolfenden looked for call letters depicting excitement phonetically: a phrase. Because on-air contests were envisioned as part of the format, the WIN theme came to mind. After much searching it appeared that WIHN was available — but it was not. WIHN belonged to "...the oil screw Oregon, sunk....", used for signal flag communications. With minimal arm-twisting by McLean's Washington FCC attorney, Tom Fletcher, the Coast Guard released the call.

Two well-known early station personalities were Doug Blair the program director, and Jerry Holtz. WIHN was one of the first stations nationally to air Casey Kasem's American Top 40 until WBNQ took it over in the early 1980's and was replaced by Rick Dees Weekly Top 40 a few years later.

In 2009, Wolfenden shipped a carton of historical documents from his home in Newport, Rhode Island to Andy Rector, President of ACC Electronix, 420 Wylie Drive in Normal, Illinois, to be included in the archives of the McLean County Historical Society as have been the records of WJBC/WBNQ. Rector was one of the original founders of McLean Communications and remains a resident of Normal. Wolfenden continues to be actively involved in radio and TV in the New England area.

WIHN flipped to its rock format in early 1995. It was known as "I97" with a logo designed to look like an Interstate designation shield. WIHN, along with then-sister station 92.9 WSNI was sold by Kelly Communications in the early 2000s to AAA Entertainment. AAA kept the rock format but rebranded the station as "96.7 I-Rock." In 2006, AAA sold the station to Connoisseur which had formed the previous year in Bloomington/Normal along with 100.7 and 97.9. Connoisseur retained the format and branding through its sale to Neuhoff Media in 2015. Neuhoff rebranded the station as "Rock 96.7".

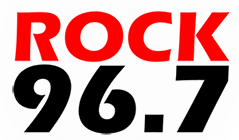
Previous logo

On November 22, 2024, Woodward announced the sale of WIHN and WIKC to Educational Media Foundation and it's expected to flip to K-Love after closing.
