= WCKK =

- Walnut Grove, Mississippi; United States
- Broadcast area: Choctaw/Philadelphia, Mississippi
- Frequency: 96.7 MHz
- Branding: "Kicks 96"

Programming
- Language: English
- Format: Country

Ownership
- Owner: Johnny Boswell Radio, LLC

History
- First air date: 2011
- Former frequencies: 98.3 MHz (2011–2019)

Technical information
- Licensing authority: FCC
- Facility ID: 183307
- Class: C2
- ERP: 44,000 watts
- HAAT: 150 meters (490 ft)
- Transmitter coordinates: 32°50′00″N 89°20′51″W

Links
- Public license information: Public file; LMS
- Website: kicks967.com

WCKK (96.7 FM, "Kicks 96") is an American radio station licensed to serve Walnut Grove, Mississippi and covering Carthage,. The station's broadcast license is held by Boswell Media, LLC.

== Programming ==
WCKK broadcasts a country music format. The morning show, "The Morning House Party," features Eric Matthews, Lora Beckham, and news with Dave Ingram. Kicks 96 can be heard from Starkville to Jackson and from Winona to Meridian. Eric Matthews left the Morning House Party after a successful 13 years with WCKK moving back to his hometown of Elyria, Ohio. Award winning Mississippi newscaster Dave Ingram died in 2016. Stance Bingham, a 30-year radio veteran, became the new host of "The Morning House Party" in July 2017. The new show line-up features news with Mina Mooney, "Minute with the Mayor" segment with Philadelphia, MS Mayor James Young, and live updates with WTOK-TV Philadelphia Bureau Reporter Ashleigh Fortenberry.

== History ==
In October 2009, Johnny Boswell Radio, LLC applied to the Federal Communications Commission (FCC) for a construction permit for a new broadcast radio station. The FCC granted this permit on November 16, 2010, with a scheduled expiration date of November 16, 2013. The new station was assigned call sign "WCKK" on December 3, 2010. After construction and testing were completed in June 2011, the station was granted its broadcast license on November 30, 2011.
