= WKSW =

Coordinates: 36.143°N 85.467°W

- Cookeville, Tennessee; United States
- Frequency: 98.5 MHz
- Branding: Classic Rock 98.5

Programming
- Format: Classic rock

Ownership
- Owner: Zimmer Broadcasting, LLC; (Cookeville Communications, LLC)
- Sister stations: WGSQ, WHUB, WPTN

History
- First air date: 1964 (as WHUB-FM)
- Former call signs: WHUB-FM (1964–1997); WGIC (1997–2013)

Technical information
- Licensing authority: FCC
- Facility ID: 72329
- Class: C2
- ERP: 50,000 watts
- HAAT: 150 meters (490 ft)

Links
- Public license information: Public file; LMS
- Webcast: Listen Live
- Website: 985.rocks

WKSW (98.5 FM) is a classic rock formatted radio station broadcasting from Cookeville, Tennessee. The station is owned by Zimmer Broadcasting, LLC.

== History ==
Logo as Kiss FM, 2013-2026

On February 14, 2013, the then-WGIC rebranded from "Magic 98.5" to "98.5 Kiss FM". On February 21, 2013, WGIC changed their call letters to WKSW, to go with the "Kiss FM" branding.

On May 1, 2026 at noon, after playing "Blinding Lights" by The Weeknd, WKSW flipped to classic rock as "Classic Rock 98.5". The first song was "For Those About to Rock (We Salute You)" by AC/DC.

== On-Air Staff ==
Under the Kiss format, the station aired a mostly local airstaff, led off by the "Freak Show In The Morning" with "Freak Dave", with Rae Rae hosting middays, Scooter hosting "Afternoons With The Scoot", Abbey hosting evening shifts, and Jeff MCartne hosting on weekends.

With the move from CHR to classic rock, the airstaff was similarly and unanimously switched, with Compass Media Networks' syndicated Dave & Mahoney set for mornings. General manager Jason Grider will follow in middays. Then-current WPTN afternoon and evening hosts Hoseppy and Troy Ameen were also listed in the same timeslots on WKSW.
