= WIBL =

Coordinates: 40.630°N 88.781°W

- Fairbury, Illinois; United States
- Broadcast area: Bloomington-Normal
- Frequency: 107.7 MHz
- Branding: 107-7 & 92-1 The Bull

Programming
- Format: Country
- Affiliations: Compass Media Networks

Ownership
- Owner: Pilot Media LLC
- Operator: Zimmer Media Group (through subsidiary Great Plains Media)
- Sister stations: WZIM, WRPW

History
- First air date: August 2000
- Former call signs: WBZM (2000–2003); WYST (2003–2010)
- Call sign meaning: Illinois' Bull

Technical information
- Licensing authority: FCC
- Facility ID: 86178
- Class: B1
- ERP: 14,000 watts
- HAAT: 135 meters (443 ft)
- Translator: 92.1 W221CY (Normal)

Links
- Public license information: Public file; LMS
- Webcast: Listen live
- Website: 1077thebull.com

WIBL (107.7 FM, "The Bull") is a commercial radio station licensed to Fairbury, Illinois, United States, and serves the Bloomington-Normal radio market in Central Illinois with a country music format. WIBL is owned by Pilot Media and operated by Zimmer Radio Group.

WIBL's transmitter is sited South Pine Street, south of Lexington. The station also has an FM translator covering Bloomington-Normal proper, W221CY (92.1), licensed to Normal.

== History ==
The station signed on in August 2000, as WBZM, "The Buzz". Owned by Cromwell Broadcasting, it was operated out of Peoria with an alternative rock format shared with WIXO in Peoria, featuring Bob and Tom, and sharing that station's personnel.

Cromwell sold off its Peoria stations in 2001, with WBZM not included. Operations were moved to Cromwell's Decatur facility while the station remained for sale. At the end of 2001, AAA Entertainment purchased the station, at first simulcasting WIHN, then WDQZ.

On March 28, 2003, the station switched to its own adult contemporary format as "Star 107.7", with the new calls WYST. Originally transmitting from Fairbury, the station's transmitter was moved three months later to Lexington, allowing it full coverage of the inner ring of the Bloomington-Normal metro for the first time.

In February 2007, the format was modified to what would be a placeholder urban contemporary format, branding as the "heart and soul" of Bloomington-Normal. Two months later, it was integrated into the Zimmer stations through Great Plains Media, with that entity taking control of the station through a local marketing agreement while the station was in the process of being sold to GPM. Zimmer would then wait until the sale was closed in late June 2007, and on June 29, the station became a country station as "107.7 The Bull", though it did not change its calls to reflect its new steer-specific branding for three years. The station finally switched to its current WIBL callsign on August 17, 2010.
