= WJEZ =

- Dwight, Illinois; United States
- Broadcast area: Pontiac, Illinois; Morris, Illinois; Wilmington, Illinois
- Frequency: 98.9 MHz
- Branding: Classic Hits 98.9

Programming
- Format: Classic hits

Ownership
- Owner: Cumulus Media; (Cumulus Licensing LLC)
- Sister stations: WBNQ; WBWN; WJBC

History
- First air date: 1998 (as WLDC)
- Former call signs: WDWT (1994–1997, CP); WLDC (1997–2003)
- Call sign meaning: "Easy"

Technical information
- Licensing authority: FCC
- Facility ID: 19211
- Class: A
- ERP: 1,300 watts
- HAAT: 149 meters (489 ft)
- Transmitter coordinates: 41°2′6″N 88°26′10″W

Links
- Public license information: Public file; LMS
- Webcast: Listen live
- Website: www.wjez.com

WJEZ (98.9 FM, "Classic Hits 98.9") is a radio station licensed to the community of Dwight, Illinois, United States, and serving the greater Livingston County, Illinois, area. The station is owned by Cumulus Media and licensed to Cumulus Licensing LLC, which purchased the station from Townsquare Media. It airs a classic hits music format. In addition, the station superserves the area with news and information.

The station was assigned the WJEZ call letters by the Federal Communications Commission on May 16, 2003.

On November 29, 2012, WJEZ changed its format from adult contemporary to classic hits.
