= WJBC (AM) =

- Bloomington, Illinois; United States
- Broadcast area: Bloomington-Normal
- Frequency: 1230 kHz

Programming
- Format: News/talk
- Affiliations: ABC News Radio; NBC News Radio; Premiere Networks; Radio America; Westwood One

Ownership
- Owner: Cumulus Media; (Cumulus Licensing LLC)
- Sister stations: WBNQ; WBWN; WJEZ

History
- First air date: May 1925
- Former frequencies: 1200 kHz (LaSalle/Normal, 1928–1941); 1320 kHz (LaSalle, 1927–1928); 1280 kHz (LaSalle, 1925–1927)
- Call sign meaning: "Where Jazz Becomes Classic" (old mnemonic for sequentially assigned callsign)

Technical information
- Licensing authority: FCC
- Facility ID: 5876
- Class: C
- Power: 1,000 watts unlimited
- Transmitter coordinates: 40°27′1.1″N 89°0′42.3″W (NAD83)
- Translator: 102.1 W271DC (Bloomington)

Links
- Public license information: Public file; LMS
- Webcast: Listen live
- Website: www.wjbc.com

WJBC (1230 kHz) is a commercial AM radio station licensed to Bloomington, Illinois, and serving the Bloomington-Normal region. It broadcasts a news/talk radio format and is owned by Cumulus Media, part of a five-station cluster. It has two full-time show hosts. The station calls itself "The Voice of Central Illinois".

WJBC is powered at 1,000 watts, using a non-directional antenna. The transmitter is on Greenwood Avenue at West Hamilton Road in Bloomington. Programming is also heard on 50-watt FM translator W271DC at 102.1 MHz.

== Programming ==
=== Talk ===
In morning drive time, Scott Miller is heard. In afternoon drive, Blake Haas hosts. Syndicated programming on the station includes The Ramsey Show, The Rich Eisen Show, CBS Eye on the World with John Batchelor, Our American Stories, Coast to Coast AM with George Noory, and America in the Morning.

On weekends, WJBC has shows on home repair, real estate, technology and travel. Weekend hosts include Kim Komando and Chris Plante. Most hours begin with CBS News Radio. A station staff supplies local news, sports and agricultural reports.

=== Sports ===
WJBC has been the longtime home to the Illinois State Redbirds, as well as local high school sports. It also carries Chicago Bears football and St. Louis Cardinals baseball. On occasion, WJBC has also broadcast the Central Illinois Flying Aces and the Bloomington Edge.

== History ==
=== Early years ===
The station was first licensed on April 17, 1925, to the Hummer Furniture Store at Second and Joliet streets in La Salle, Illinois. It was initially powered at 100 watts on 1280 kHz. The WJBC call sign was randomly assigned from a sequential roster of available call letters. However, for a while the station adopted the mnemonic slogan "Where Jazz Becomes Classic". The station later moved from the Hummer store to the Kaskaskia Hotel. During the years in La Salle, it moved to 1320 kHz, then 1200 kHz.

=== Move to Bloomington ===
The Great Depression eventually closed both the companies backing the station in LaSalle, and the owner of Hummer Furniture owner moved the station to Bloomington-Normal.

Malcolm Magregor bought WJBC from Kaskaskia Broadcasting Company effective April 1, 1933. At that time, WJBC was still a 100-watt station, sharing time with WJBL in Decatur, Illinois.

=== New facilities ===
On September 11, 1934, WJBC began transmitting from its new facilities, making it the first radio station in Bloomington. The transmitter was in Normal and its main studio was at Illinois Wesleyan University in Bloomington. Other studios were at Illinois State Normal School and the Illinois Farm Bureau. At first it was only on the air a few hours a day, with eight daily newscasts, weather twice a day, and the Western Union time announced at the top of each hour.

For much of the 1940s and 1950s, WJBC was affiliated with the NBC Blue Network and its successor, the ABC Radio Network. It carried a line up of dramas, comedies, news, sports and other programs during the "Golden Age of Radio". It was owned by the Bloomington Broadcasting Company, which also put an FM station on the air in 1947, 101.5 WJBC-FM (now WBNQ). The two stations mostly simulcast for the FM station's first two decades on the air.

=== Rev. R.J. Zehr ===
On the morning of August 25, 1971, the station broadcast the last radio program of the Reverend R.J. Zehr, who died later that morning. Zehr's first broadcast on the station was on a Sunday in October 1934; shortly thereafter, he was given a daily slot, which he continued - without missing a day - until the mid-1960s.

Almost all of Zehr's broadcasts were live, not prerecorded. In 1949, he began doing the program from his house, via telephone. His program's time slot varied over the years, but normally aired between 5:00 a.m. and 6:30 a.m., and lasted 15 to 30 minutes.

The audio tape cartridge machine, which fundamentally changed the way radio stations played commercials and music on air, was developed at WJBC in 1959. Ted Bailey (then Chief Engineer of WJBC) and staff engineer Jack Jenkins developed the ATC (Automatic Tape Control) machine. A joint patent was granted to Bailey, Jenkins and Nolte (station manager of WJBC) as inventors.

=== Cumulus Media ===
On April 30, 2012, Townsquare Media announced that it was selling the station to Cumulus Media. The assignment of the station's license to Cumulus was consummated on July 31, 2012.

In 2005, and again in 2009, the station won the Marconi Award from the National Association of Broadcasters for Best Small Market Radio Station in the United States. WJBC has won several Edward R. Murrow Awards for its local news coverage, as well as several Illinois Silver Dome Awards.

== Personalities ==
=== Current ===
- Scott Miller

=== Former ===
- Denny Adkins
- Bob Arya
- Bones Bach
- Marla Behrends
- Ken Behrens
- Nancy Blair
- Keith Blankenship
- Mike Bradd
- Chris Brathwaite
- Dara Brockmeier
- Jim Browne
- Adam "Cha-Cha" Chandler
- Jim Cheney
- Craig Collins
- Elizabeth Estes Cooper
- Sarah Curtis
- L.A. Decker
- Ryan Denham
- Mark Dennis
- Zach Dietmeier
- Neil Doyle
- Paul Dunn
- Jim Durham
- Karen Erks
- John Fitzgerald
- Jim Fitzpatrick
- Jake Fogal
- Keith Gottschalk
- Lee Hall
- TJ Hart
- Cameron D. James
- Terry James
- Mark Johnson
- Rob Kass
- Willis Kern
- Art Kimball
- Scott Laughlin
- Tim Lewis
- Dick Luedke
- Gene Lyle
- Stacy Marshall
- R.C. McBride
- Nick McClintock
- Amy Meyer
- Paul Morello
- Don Munson
- Katherine Murphy
- Lori Nelson
- Don Newberg
- Adam Nielsen
- Royal Norman
- Don Norton
- Howard Packowitz
- Zach Parcell
- Stephanie Pawlowski
- Patti Penn
- L.P. Phillips
- Red Pitcher
- Joe Ragusa
- Colleen Reynolds
- Scott Robbins
- Daune Robinson
- Chris Rongey
- Ron Ross
- Scott Ross
- Stew Salowitz
- Jim Sauers
- J.D. Scott
- Art Sechrest
- Alan Sender
- Harvey J. Steele
- Adam Studzinski
- Dan Swaney
- Dick Templeton
- Steve Vogel
- Bill Walberg
- Beth Whisman
- Larry Whittaker
- Todd Wineburner
- Lyle Wood
- Sean Copeland
