= Bloomington–Normal =

Bloomington–Normal Bloomington–Normal, IL MSA
- Metropolitan Statistical Area
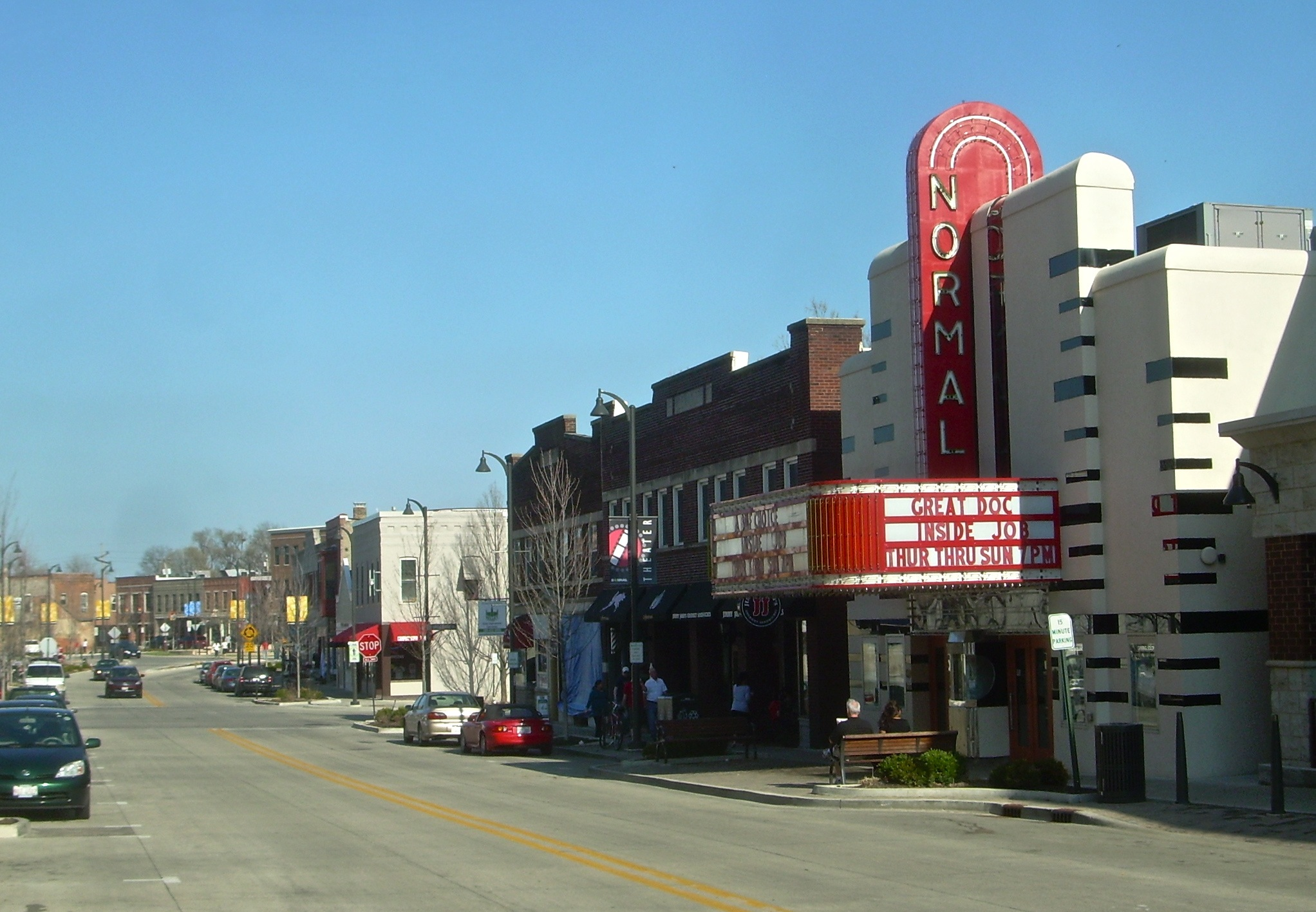
- Uptown Normal, looking east on North Street, 2011
Map of Bloomington–Normal–Pontiac, IL CSA
Bloomington–Normal, IL MSA
Pontiac, IL µSA
City of Bloomington
Town of Normal
- Country: United States
- State: Illinois
- Principal cities: Bloomington; Normal

Area
  - Urban: 49.2 sq mi (127 km^{2})
  - Metro: 1,601 sq mi (4,150 km^{2})

Population (2010)
  - Urban: 132,600 (243rd)
  - MSA: 190,345 (225th)
  - CSA: 229,253 (130th)
- Time zone: UTC−6 (CST)
  - Summer (DST): UTC−5 (CDT)

The Bloomington–Normal Metropolitan Statistical Area, commonly known as the Bloomington Metropolitan Statistical Area or Bloomington–Normal, is a metropolitan statistical area in Central Illinois anchored by the twin municipalities of Bloomington and Normal. At the 2020 U.S. census, the municipalities of Bloomington and Normal had a combined urban population of 131,416, while the metropolitan area had a population of 171,210.

Prior to 2013, the metropolitan area consisted of only McLean County. In 2013, the Office of Management and Budget revised the delineations of the metropolitan area to include all of DeWitt and McLean counties. Additionally, the Bloomington–Pontiac Combined Statistical Area was created to combine the Bloomington MSA with the Pontiac, Illinois micropolitan statistical area. The CSA includes McLean, DeWitt, and Livingston counties.

The McLean County Regional Planning Commission (MCRPC) serves as the designated metropolitan planning organization (MPO) for Bloomington–Normal. The metropolitan planning area (MPA) of MCRPC includes Bloomington, Normal, Downs, and Towanda.

== Economy ==
The Bloomington–Normal metropolitan area had a gross domestic product (GDP) of around $15 billion in 2023. The largest industries include finance and insurance, educational services, manufacturing, and health care.

The Bloomington–Normal area is home to the headquarters of major companies and organizations such as State Farm, COUNTRY Financial, FS Growmark, Illinois Farm Bureau, Beer Nuts, and the Illinois High School Association (IHSA).

The area hosts three higher educational institutions. Normal hosts Illinois State University and Heartland Community College. Bloomington hosts Illinois Wesleyan University.

Carle BroMenn Medical Center in Normal and OSF St. Joseph Medical Center in Bloomington provide health services and health industry jobs to the area.

In recent years, the Bloomington–Normal area has seen a resurgence of its manufacturing center. In 2017, Rivian purchased the old Mitsubishi Motors manufacturing plant for $16 million in northwest Normal. Since 2021, the company has employed nearly 8,000 workers producing electric-vehicle products such as the R1T pick-up truck, the R2 SUV, and electric delivery vans for Amazon.

In 2024, Rivian announced plans to invest over $1.2 billion in its Normal facility in order to assist with the production of the R2. The company will receive financial assistance from the Illinois Department of Commerce and Economic Opportunity. In 2025, Rivian announced plans to build a new $120 million supplier park.

Ferrero USA announced in 2020 plans for a $75 million expansion of its Bloomington plant. In May 2024, Ferrero officially opened its first-ever chocolate factory in North America located in Bloomington as part of a $214 million investment.

== Transportation ==
Due to its centralized location in Illinois, the Bloomington–Normal metropolitan area hosts a variety of transportation networks and services such as three interstates, an Amtrak station, two freight railroads, and an airport with commercial air service.

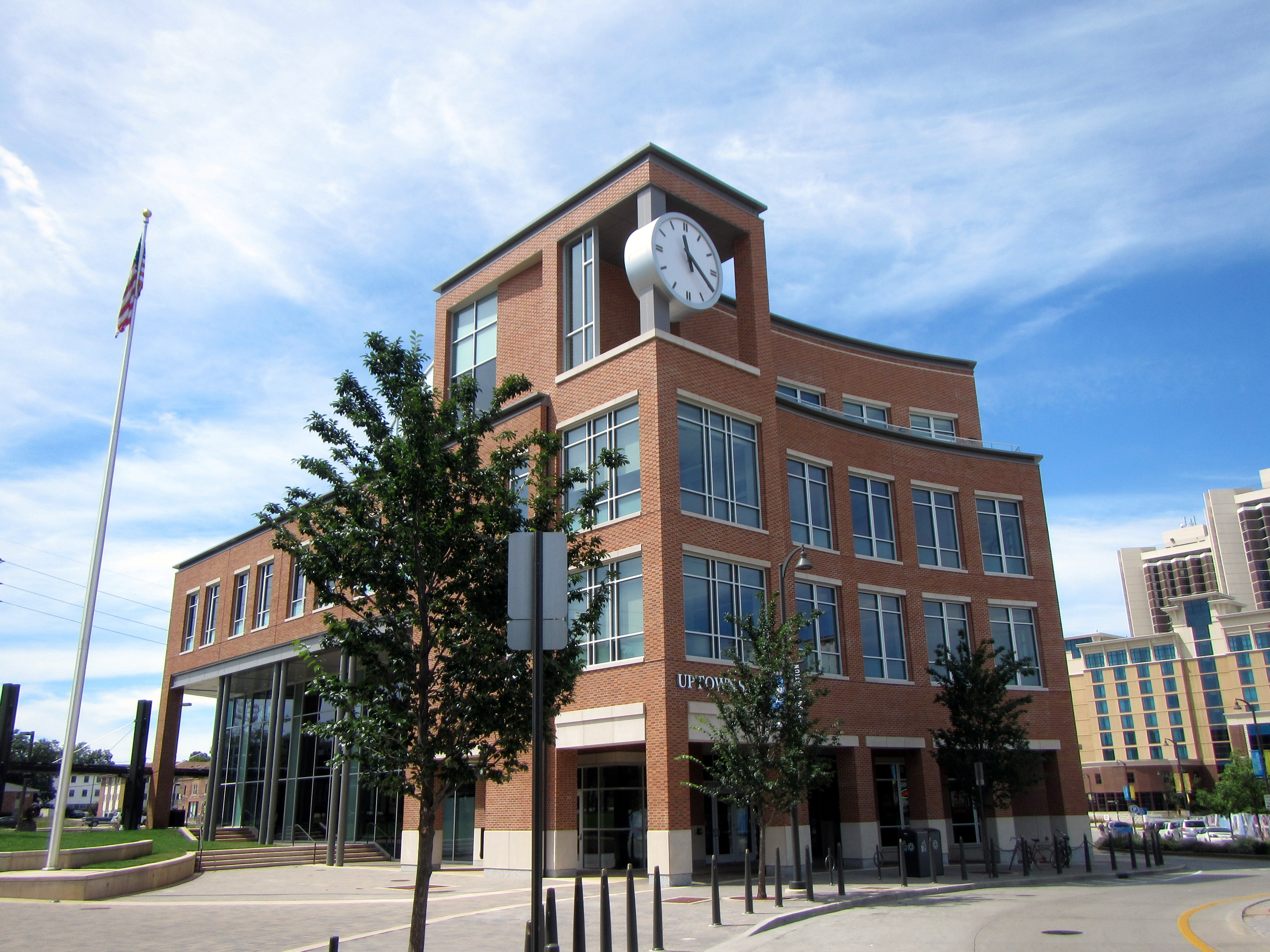
Uptown Station

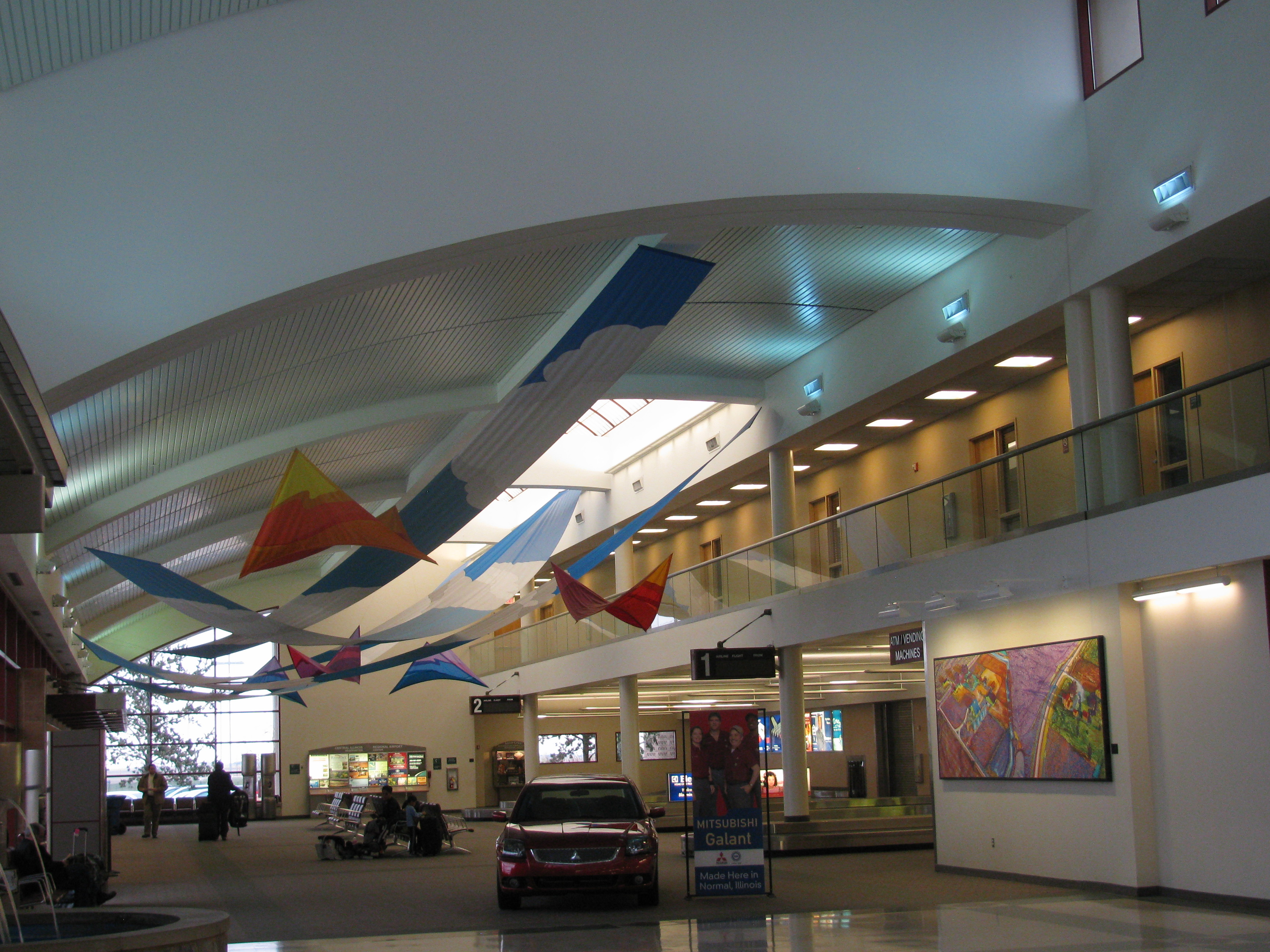
Central Illinois Regional Airport

Interstate 55 runs north–south through Bloomington and Normal, connecting the area north to Chicago and south to St. Louis. Interstate 74 runs northwest–southeast through Bloomington and Normal, connecting the area to Peoria and Indianapolis. The southern terminus of Interstate 39 is in Normal and connects the area north to Rockford and Madison. U.S. Route 51 bisects Bloomington and Normal, and connects to area south to Decatur. Veterans Parkway (I-55 BUS) is a major arterial that runs on the east side of Bloomington–Normal that hosts most of the area's commercial shopping centers and corporate headquarters such as State Farm and COUNTRY Financial. Other major highways in the area include U.S. Route 150 and Illinois Route 9. McLean County is located in Region 3, District 5 of the Illinois Department of Transportation (IDOT).

Uptown Station serves as Bloomington–Normal's primary intermodal transportation center. Located in the Uptown Normal business district, it is served by Amtrak's Lincoln Service inter-city rail line and Texas Eagle long-distance service. Both services provide five daily round-trips to Chicago and St. Louis. One Lincoln Service round-trip continues on to Kansas City as a combined train with the Missouri River Runner. The Texas Eagle provides one daily train in each direction and connects south to Little Rock, Dallas, Fort Worth, Austin, and San Antonio. Three times a week, a portion of the train continues further to Los Angeles. Since 2023, trains run at a top speed of 110-mph. The station is also served by Connect Transit buses, Peoria Charter, Greyhound, and Jefferson Lines.

Two Class I freight railroads serve Bloomington–Normal: Union Pacific (UP) and Norfolk Southern (NS). UP has a rail yard in Bloomington and NS has a rail yard in Normal next to the Rivian facility.

Connect Transit is the primary urban public transit provider in Bloomington–Normal. It operates 16 fixed-routes with hubs at Uptown Station and Downtown Bloomington. Buses run every 15, 30, or 60 minutes, depending on the route, time of day, and day of the week. It also operates a paratransit service branded as Connect Mobility and a micotransit service in southwest Bloomington branded as Connect FLEX. In July 2025, Connect Transit began operating a new demand-response service for rural McLean County branded as Connect GO. McLean County is located in Region 6 of IDOT's Human Services Transportation Program (HSTP).

Central Illinois Regional Airport (BMI), located in Bloomington and commonly referred to as "CIRA", provides commercial air service to the area. American Eagle provides daily service to Chicago–O'Hare and Dallas/Fort Worth. Delta Connection provides daily service to Atlanta. Allegiant Air provides service to Orlando/Sanford and St. Petersburg/Clearwater. Allegiant Air will begin new service to Phoenix/Mesa on February 13, 2026. Beginning May 7, 2026, United Express will provide service to Chicago–O'Hare.

== See also ==
- Illinois statistical areas
