= List of FM radio stations in the United States by call sign (initial letters WQ–WS) =

This is a list of FM radio stations in the United States having call signs beginning with the letters WQ through WS. Low-power FM radio stations, those with designations such as WQAR-LP, have not been included in this list.

== WQ ==
Callsign	Frequency	City of license
WQAH-FM	105.7 FM	Addison, Alabama
WQAI	89.5 FM	Thomson, Georgia
WQAK	105.7 FM	Union City, Tennessee
WQAL	104.1 FM	Cleveland, Ohio
WQAM-FM	104.3 FM	Miramar, Florida
WQAQ	98.1 FM	Hamden, Connecticut
WQBE-FM	97.5 FM	Charleston, West Virginia
WQBG	100.5 FM	Elizabethville, Pennsylvania
WQBK-FM	105.7 FM	Malta, New York
WQBR	99.9 FM	Avis, Pennsylvania
WQBS-FM	107.7 FM	Carolina, Puerto Rico
WQBT	94.1 FM	Savannah, Georgia
WQBX	104.9 FM	Alma, Michigan
WQBZ	106.3 FM	Fort Valley, Georgia
WQCB	106.5 FM	Brewer, Maine
WQCC	106.3 FM	La Crosse, Wisconsin
WQCM	94.3 FM	Greencastle, Pennsylvania
WQCP	88.5 FM	Clewiston, Florida
WQCS	88.9 FM	Fort Pierce, Florida
WQCY	103.9 FM	Quincy, Illinois
WQDC	97.7 FM	Sturgeon Bay, Wisconsin
WQDK	99.3 FM	Gatesville, North Carolina
WQDR-FM	94.7 FM	Raleigh, North Carolina
WQDY-FM	92.7 FM	Calais, Maine
WQED-FM	89.3 FM	Pittsburgh, Pennsylvania
WQEJ	89.7 FM	Johnstown, Pennsylvania
WQEL	92.7 FM	Bucyrus, Ohio
WQEM	101.5 FM	Columbiana, Alabama
WQEN	103.7 FM	Trussville, Alabama
WQFL	100.9 FM	Rockford, Illinois
WQFM	92.1 FM	Nanticoke, Pennsylvania
WQFN	100.1 FM	Forest City, Pennsylvania
WQFS	90.9 FM	Greensboro, North Carolina
WQFX-FM	103.1 FM	Russell, Pennsylvania
WQGA	103.3 FM	Waycross, Georgia
WQGN-FM	105.5 FM	Groton, Connecticut
WQGR	93.7 FM	North Madison, Ohio
WQHE	88.3 FM	Oil City, Pennsylvania
WQHH	96.5 FM	Dewitt, Michigan
WQHK-FM	105.1 FM	Huntertown, Indiana
WQHL-FM	98.1 FM	Live Oak, Florida
WQHN	100.9 FM	East Jordan, Michigan
WQHQ	104.7 FM	Ocean City/Salisbury, Maryland
WQHR	96.1 FM	Presque Isle, Maine
WQHT	97.1 FM	New York City
WQHY	95.5 FM	Prestonburg, Kentucky
WQHZ	102.3 FM	Erie, Pennsylvania
WQIK-FM	99.1 FM	Jacksonville, Florida
WQIL	101.3 FM	Chauncey, Georgia
WQIO	93.7 FM	Mount Vernon, Ohio
WQIQ	88.3 FM	Spotsylvania, Virginia
WQJU	107.1 FM	Mifflintown, Pennsylvania
WQKI-FM	95.7 FM	Orangeburg, South Carolina
WQKL	107.1 FM	Ann Arbor, Michigan
WQKO	91.9 FM	Howe, Indiana
WQKQ	92.1 FM	Dallas City, Illinois
WQKS-FM	96.1 FM	Montgomery, Alabama
WQKT	104.5 FM	Wooster, Ohio
WQKV	88.7 FM	Warsaw, Indiana
WQKX	94.1 FM	Sunbury, Pennsylvania
WQKY	98.9 FM	Emporium, Pennsylvania
WQKZ	98.5 FM	Ferdinand, Indiana
WQLB	103.3 FM	Tawas City, Michigan
WQLC	102.1 FM	Watertown, Florida
WQLF	102.1 FM	Lena, Illinois
WQLH	98.5 FM	Green Bay, Wisconsin
WQLI	92.3 FM	Meigs, Georgia
WQLJ	105.5 FM	Water Valley, Mississippi
WQLK	96.1 FM	Richmond, Indiana
WQLN-FM	91.3 FM	Erie, Pennsylvania
WQLR	94.7 FM	Chateaugay, New York
WQLT-FM	107.3 FM	Florence, Alabama
WQLV	98.9 FM	Millersburg, Pennsylvania
WQLX	106.5 FM	Chillicothe, Ohio
WQLZ	97.7 FM	Petersburg, Illinois
WQME	98.7 FM	Anderson, Indiana
WQMF	95.7 FM	Jeffersonville, Indiana
WQMG	97.1 FM	Greensboro, North Carolina
WQMJ	100.1 FM	Forsyth, Georgia
WQML	101.5 FM	Ceiba, Puerto Rico
WQMN	88.7 FM	Minocqua, Wisconsin
WQMT	93.9 FM	Hopewell, Tennessee
WQMU	92.5 FM	Indiana, Pennsylvania
WQMX	94.9 FM	Medina, Ohio
WQMZ	95.1 FM	Charlottesville, Virginia
WQNQ	104.3 FM	Fletcher, North Carolina
WQNR	99.9 FM	Tallassee, Alabama
WQNS	105.1 FM	Woodfin, North Carolina
WQNU	103.1 FM	Lyndon, Kentucky
WQNY	103.7 FM	Ithaca, New York
WQNZ	95.1 FM	Natchez, Mississippi
WQOH-FM	88.7 FM	Springville, Alabama
WQOK	97.5 FM	Carrboro, North Carolina
WQOL	103.7 FM	Vero Beach, Florida
WQON	100.3 FM	Grayling, Michigan
WQOR	90.5 FM	Laceyville, Pennsylvania
WQOX	88.5 FM	Memphis, Tennessee
WQPC	94.3 FM	Prairie du Chien, Wisconsin
WQPD	100.1 FM	Lake City, South Carolina
WQPH	89.3 FM	Shirley, Massachusetts
WQPO	100.7 FM	Harrisonburg, Virginia
WQPR	88.7 FM	Muscle Shoals, Alabama
WQPW	95.7 FM	Valdosta, Georgia
WQQA	91.7 FM	Forestville, Wisconsin
WQQB	96.1 FM	Rantoul, Illinois
WQQK	92.1 FM	Goodlettsville, Tennessee
WQQO	105.5 FM	Sylvania, Ohio
WQQP	95.9 FM	Sykesville, Pennsylvania
WQQQ	103.3 FM	Sharon, Connecticut
WQRA	90.5 FM	Greencastle, Indiana
WQRB	95.1 FM	Bloomer, Wisconsin
WQRC	99.9 FM	Barnstable, Massachusetts
WQRI	88.3 FM	Bristol, Rhode Island
WQRK	105.5 FM	Bedford, Indiana
WQRL	106.3 FM	Benton, Illinois
WQRN	88.9 FM	Cook, Minnesota
WQRP	89.5 FM	Dayton, Ohio
WQRR	101.7 FM	Reform, Alabama
WQRS	98.3 FM	Salamanca, New York
WQRV	100.3 FM	Meridianville, Alabama
WQRW	93.5 FM	Wellsville, New York
WQSB	105.1 FM	Albertville, Alabama
WQSG	90.7 FM	Lafayette, Indiana
WQSH	103.5 FM	Cobleskill, New York
WQSI	93.9 FM	Union Springs, Alabama
WQSK	97.5 FM	Madison, Maine
WQSL	92.3 FM	Jacksonville, North Carolina
WQSM	98.1 FM	Fayetteville, North Carolina
WQSN	106.3 FM	Norton, Virginia
WQSO	96.7 FM	Rochester, New Hampshire
WQSR	102.7 FM	Baltimore, Maryland
WQSS	102.5 FM	Camden, Maine
WQST-FM	92.5 FM	Forest, Mississippi
WQSU	88.9 FM	Selinsgrove, Pennsylvania
WQTC-FM	102.3 FM	Manitowoc, Wisconsin
WQTE	95.3 FM	Adrian, Michigan
WQTK	92.7 FM	Ogdensburg, New York
WQTL	106.1 FM	Tallahassee, Florida
WQTQ	89.9 FM	Hartford, Connecticut
WQTS	102.9 FM	Statesboro, Georgia
WQTU	102.3 FM	Rome, Georgia
WQTX	92.1 FM	St. Johns, Michigan
WQTY	93.3 FM	Linton, Indiana
WQUA	102.1 FM	Citronelle, Alabama
WQUB	90.3 FM	Quincy, Illinois
WQUD	107.7 FM	Erie, Illinois
WQUE-FM	93.3 FM	New Orleans, Louisiana
WQUS	103.1 FM	Lapeer, Michigan
WQUT	101.5 FM	Johnson City, Tennessee
WQVE	101.7 FM	Albany, Georgia
WQVI	90.5 FM	Madison, Mississippi
WQWK	105.9 FM	Philipsburg, Pennsylvania
WQWV	103.7 FM	Fisher, West Virginia
WQWY	103.9 FM	Bellwood, Pennsylvania
WQXA-FM	105.7 FM	York, Pennsylvania
WQXB	100.1 FM	Grenada, Mississippi
WQXC-FM	100.9 FM	Allegan, Michigan
WQXE	98.3 FM	Elizabethtown, Kentucky
WQXK	105.1 FM	Salem, Ohio
WQXR-FM	105.9 FM	Newark, New Jersey
WQXW	90.3 FM	Ossining, New York
WQYK-FM	99.5 FM	St. Petersburg, Florida
WQYZ	92.5 FM	Ocean Springs, Mississippi
WQZK-FM	94.1 FM	Keyser, West Virginia
WQZL	101.1 FM	Belhaven, North Carolina
WQZS	93.3 FM	Meyersdale, Pennsylvania
WQZX	94.3 FM	Greenville, Alabama
WQZY	95.9 FM	Dublin, Georgia
WQZZ	107.3 FM	Boligee, Alabama

== WR ==
Callsign	Frequency	City of license
WRAC	103.1 FM	Georgetown, Ohio
WRAD-FM	101.7 FM	Radford, Virginia
WRAE	88.7 FM	Raeford, North Carolina
WRAF	90.9 FM	Toccoa Falls, Georgia
WRAL	101.5 FM	Raleigh, North Carolina
WRAN	97.3 FM	Taylorville, Illinois
WRAO	91.7 FM	Wisconsin Rapids, Wisconsin
WRAR-FM	105.5 FM	Tappahannock, Virginia
WRAS	88.5 FM	Atlanta
WRAT	95.9 FM	Point Pleasant, New Jersey
WRAY-FM	98.1 FM	Princeton, Indiana
WRAZ-FM	106.3 FM	Leisure City, Florida
WRBA	95.9 FM	Springfield, Florida
WRBB	104.9 FM	Boston, Massachusetts
WRBC	91.5 FM	Lewiston, Maine
WRBE-FM	106.9 FM	Lucedale, Mississippi
WRBF	104.9 FM	Plainville, Georgia
WRBG	98.3 FM	Mifflinburg, Pennsylvania
WRBH	88.3 FM	New Orleans, Louisiana
WRBI	103.9 FM	Batesville, Indiana
WRBJ-FM	97.7 FM	Brandon, Mississippi
WRBK	90.3 FM	Richburg, South Carolina
WRBO	103.5 FM	Como, Mississippi
WRBQ-FM	104.7 FM	Tampa, Florida
WRBR-FM	103.9 FM	South Bend, Indiana
WRBS-FM	95.1 FM	Baltimore, Maryland
WRBT	94.9 FM	Harrisburg, Pennsylvania
WRBV	101.7 FM	Warner Robins, Georgia
WRBX	104.1 FM	Reidsville, Georgia
WRCC	88.3 FM	Dibrell, Tennessee
WRCD	101.5 FM	Canton, New York
WRCH	100.5 FM	New Britain, Connecticut
WRCJ-FM	90.9 FM	Detroit, Michigan
WRCL	93.7 FM	Frankenmuth, Michigan
WRCM	91.9 FM	Wingate, North Carolina
WRCN-FM	103.9 FM	Riverhead, New York
WRCO-FM	100.9 FM	Richland Center, Wisconsin
WRCQ	103.5 FM	Dunn, North Carolina
WRCT	88.3 FM	Pittsburgh, Pennsylvania
WRCU-FM	90.1 FM	Hamilton, New York
WRCV	101.7 FM	Dixon, Illinois
WRDE-FM	103.9 FM	Berlin, Maryland
WRDF	106.3 FM	Columbia City, Indiana
WRDG	96.1 FM	Atlanta
WRDI	95.7 FM	Nappanee, Indiana
WRDL	88.9 FM	Ashland, Ohio
WRDO	96.9 FM	Fitzgerald, Georgia
WRDR	89.7 FM	Freehold Township, New Jersey
WRDU	100.7 FM	Wake Forest, North Carolina
WRDV	89.3 FM	Warminster, Pennsylvania
WRDX	92.9 FM	Smyrna, Delaware
WREB	94.3 FM	Greencastle, Indiana
WREE	92.5 FM	Urbana, Illinois
WREF	97.7 FM	Sebree, Kentucky
WREK	91.1 FM	Atlanta
WREM	88.7 FM	Canton, New York
WREO-FM	97.1 FM	Ashtabula, Ohio
WREW	94.9 FM	Fairfield, Ohio
WREZ	105.5 FM	Metropolis, Illinois
WRFE	89.3 FM	Chesterfield, South Carolina
WRFF	104.5 FM	Philadelphia
WRFG	89.3 FM	Atlanta
WRFI	89.7 FM	Odessa, New York
WRFJ	91.5 FM	Fort Mill, South Carolina
WRFK	107.1 FM	Barre, Vermont
WRFL	88.1 FM	Lexington, Kentucky
WRFM	103.9 FM	Drakesboro, Kentucky
WRFQ	104.5 FM	Mount Pleasant, South Carolina
WRFS	105.1 FM	Rockford, Alabama
WRFT	91.5 FM	Indianapolis, Indiana
WRFW	88.7 FM	River Falls, Wisconsin
WRFX	99.7 FM	Kannapolis, North Carolina
WRFY-FM	102.5 FM	Reading, Pennsylvania
WRGC-FM	88.3 FM	Milledgeville, Georgia
WRGF	89.7 FM	Greenfield, Indiana
WRGN	88.1 FM	Sweet Valley, Pennsylvania
WRGP	88.1 FM	Homestead, Florida
WRGR	102.1 FM	Tupper Lake, New York
WRGV	107.3 FM	Pensacola, Florida
WRGY	90.5 FM	Rangeley, Maine
WRGZ	96.7 FM	Rogers City, Michigan
WRHD	94.3 FM	Farmville, North Carolina
WRHK	94.9 FM	Danville, Illinois
WRHM	107.1 FM	Lancaster, South Carolina
WRHN	100.1 FM	Rhinelander, Wisconsin
WRHO	89.7 FM	Oneonta, New York
WRHP	100.1 FM	Anniston, Alabama
WRHQ	105.3 FM	Richmond Hill, Georgia
WRHS	103.1 FM	Grasonville, Maryland
WRHT	96.3 FM	Morehead City, North Carolina
WRHU	88.7 FM	Hempstead, New York
WRHV	88.7 FM	Poughkeepsie, New York
WRIC-FM	97.7 FM	Richlands, Virginia
WRIF	101.1 FM	Detroit, Michigan
WRIH	88.1 FM	Richmond, Virginia
WRIL	106.3 FM	Pineville, Kentucky
WRIM	89.9 FM	Cookeville, Tennessee
WRIO	101.1 FM	Ponce, Puerto Rico
WRIP	97.9 FM	Windham, New York
WRIQ	89.7 FM	Charles City, Virginia
WRIS-FM	106.7 FM	Mount Horeb, Wisconsin
WRIT-FM	95.7 FM	Milwaukee, Wisconsin
WRIU	90.3 FM	Kingston, Rhode Island
WRJA-FM	88.1 FM	Sumter, South Carolina
WRJB	95.9 FM	Camden, Tennessee
WRJC-FM	92.1 FM	Mauston, Wisconsin
WRJJ	104.3 FM	La Center, Kentucky
WRJL-FM	99.9 FM	Eva, Alabama
WRJO	94.5 FM	Eagle River, Wisconsin
WRJS	88.1 FM	Soperton, Georgia
WRJY	104.1 FM	Brunswick, Georgia
WRKA	103.9 FM	Louisville, Kentucky
WRKC	88.5 FM	Wilkes-Barre, Pennsylvania
WRKF	89.3 FM	Baton Rouge, Louisiana
WRKH	96.1 FM	Mobile, Alabama
WRKI	95.1 FM	Brookfield, Connecticut
WRKJ	88.5 FM	Westbrook, Maine
WRKN	106.1 FM	Picayune, Mississippi
WRKR	107.7 FM	Portage, Michigan
WRKS	105.9 FM	Pickens, Mississippi
WRKT	104.9 FM	North East, Pennsylvania
WRKU	102.1 FM	Forestville, Wisconsin
WRKV	88.9 FM	Raleigh, North Carolina
WRKW	99.1 FM	Ebensburg, Pennsylvania
WRKX	95.3 FM	Ottawa, Illinois
WRKY-FM	104.9 FM	Hollidaysburg, Pennsylvania
WRKZ	99.7 FM	Columbus, Ohio
WRLB	95.3 FM	Rainelle, West Virginia
WRLC	91.7 FM	Williamsport, Pennsylvania
WRLF-FM	94.3 FM	Fairmont, West Virginia
WRLI-FM	91.3 FM	Southampton, New York
WRLJ	88.3 FM	White Hall, Illinois
WRLN	105.3 FM	Red Lake, Minnesota
WRLO-FM	105.3 FM	Antigo, Wisconsin
WRLP	89.1 FM	Orange, Virginia
WRLS-FM	92.3 FM	Hayward, Wisconsin
WRLT	100.1 FM	Franklin, Tennessee
WRLU	104.1 FM	Algoma, Wisconsin
WRLV-FM	106.5 FM	Salyersville, Kentucky
WRLX	94.3 FM	Riviera Beach, Florida
WRMA	95.7 FM	North Miami Beach, Florida
WRMB	89.3 FM	Boynton Beach, Florida
WRMC-FM	91.1 FM	Middlebury, Vermont
WRMF	97.9 FM	Palm Beach, Florida
WRMJ	102.3 FM	Aledo, Illinois
WRMM-FM	101.3 FM	Rochester, New York
WRMR	98.7 FM	Jacksonville, North Carolina
WRMS-FM	94.3 FM	Beardstown, Illinois
WRMU-FM	91.1 FM	Alliance, Ohio
WRMW	91.3 FM	Peshtigo, Wisconsin
WRNB	100.3 FM	Media, Pennsylvania
WRND	94.3 FM	Oak Grove, Kentucky
WRNF	89.5 FM	Selma, Alabama
WRNM	91.7 FM	Ellsworth, Maine
WRNN-FM	99.5 FM	Socastee, South Carolina
WRNO-FM	99.5 FM	New Orleans, Louisiana
WRNP	94.1 FM	Roanoke, Indiana
WRNQ	92.1 FM	Poughkeepsie, New York
WRNS-FM	95.1 FM	Kinston, North Carolina
WRNV	91.1 FM	Norco, Louisiana
WRNW	97.3 FM	Milwaukee, Wisconsin
WRNX	100.9 FM	Amherst, Massachusetts
WRNZ	105.1 FM	Lancaster, Kentucky
WROI	92.1 FM	Rochester, Indiana
WROK-FM	95.9 FM	Sebastian, Florida
WRON-FM	103.1 FM	Lewisburg, West Virginia
WROO	104.9 FM	Mauldin, South Carolina
WROQ	101.1 FM	Anderson, South Carolina
WROR-FM	105.7 FM	Framingham, Massachusetts
WROU-FM	92.1 FM	West Carrollton, Ohio
WROV-FM	96.3 FM	Martinsville, Virginia
WROX-FM	96.1 FM	Exmore, Virginia
WROZ	101.3 FM	Lancaster, Pennsylvania
WRPB	89.1 FM	Benedicta, Maine
WRPI	91.5 FM	Troy, New York
WRPJ	88.9 FM	Port Jervis, New York
WRPP	92.7 FM	Manistique, Michigan
WRPR	90.3 FM	Mahwah, New Jersey
WRPS	88.3 FM	Rockland, Massachusetts
WRPV	91.1 FM	Ridgway, Pennsylvania
WRPW	92.9 FM	Colfax, Illinois
WRQE	106.1 FM	Cumberland, Maryland
WRQI	94.3 FM	Saegertown, Pennsylvania
WRQK-FM	106.9 FM	Canton, Ohio
WRQM	90.9 FM	Rocky Mount, North Carolina
WRQN	93.5 FM	Bowling Green, Ohio
WRQO	102.1 FM	Monticello, Mississippi
WRQQ	103.3 FM	Hammond, Louisiana
WRQR-FM	105.5 FM	Paris, Tennessee
WRQT	95.7 FM	La Crosse, Wisconsin
WRQV	88.1 FM	Ridgway, Pennsylvania
WRQW	107.7 FM	Cooperstown, Pennsylvania
WRQY	96.5 FM	Moundsville, West Virginia
WRR	101.1 FM	Dallas, Texas
WRRA-FM	97.5 FM	Bridgman, Michigan
WRRB	96.9 FM	Arlington, New York
WRRC	107.7 FM	Lawrenceville, New Jersey
WRRD	89.9 FM	Greensboro, Georgia
WRRG	88.9 FM	River Grove, Illinois
WRRH	106.1 FM	Hormigueros, Puerto Rico
WRRJ	89.7 FM	Cocoa Beach, Florida
WRRK	96.9 FM	Braddock, Pennsylvania
WRRM	98.5 FM	Cincinnati
WRRN	92.3 FM	Warren, Pennsylvania
WRRO	89.9 FM	Edon, Ohio
WRRR-FM	93.9 FM	St. Marys, West Virginia
WRRS	88.5 FM	Bayview, Massachusetts
WRRV	92.7 FM	Middletown, New York
WRRX	106.1 FM	Gulf Breeze, Florida
WRSA-FM	96.9 FM	Holly Pond, Alabama
WRSC-FM	95.3 FM	Bellefonte, Pennsylvania
WRSD	94.9 FM	Folsom, Pennsylvania
WRSF	105.7 FM	Columbia, North Carolina
WRSG	91.5 FM	Middlebourne, West Virginia
WRSH	91.1 FM	Rockingham, North Carolina
WRSI	93.9 FM	Turners Falls, Massachusetts
WRSM	89.1 FM	Rising Sun, Maryland
WRSN	88.1 FM	Lebanon, Tennessee
WRSR	103.9 FM	Owosso, Michigan
WRST-FM	90.3 FM	Oshkosh, Wisconsin
WRSU-FM	88.7 FM	New Brunswick, New Jersey
WRSV	92.1 FM	Elm City, North Carolina
WRSW-FM	107.3 FM	Warsaw, Indiana
WRSX	91.3 FM	Port Huron, Michigan
WRSY	101.5 FM	Marlboro, Vermont
WRTB	95.3 FM	Winnebago, Illinois
WRTC-FM	89.3 FM	Hartford, Connecticut
WRTE	90.7 FM	Chicago
WRTI	90.1 FM	Philadelphia
WRTJ	89.3 FM	Coatesville, Pennsylvania
WRTK	90.5 FM	Paxton, Illinois
WRTL	90.7 FM	Ephrata, Pennsylvania
WRTM-FM	100.5 FM	Sharon, Mississippi
WRTO-FM	98.3 FM	Goulds, Florida
WRTP	88.5 FM	Franklinton, North Carolina
WRTQ	91.3 FM	Ocean City, New Jersey
WRTR	105.9 FM	Brookwood, Alabama
WRTS	103.7 FM	Erie, Pennsylvania
WRTT-FM	95.1 FM	Huntsville, Alabama
WRTU	89.7 FM	San Juan, Puerto Rico
WRTW	90.5 FM	Crown Point, Indiana
WRTX	91.7 FM	Dover, Delaware
WRTY	91.1 FM	Jackson Township, Pennsylvania
WRUC	89.7 FM	Schenectady, New York
WRUF-FM	103.7 FM	Gainesville, Florida
WRUL	97.3 FM	Carmi, Illinois
WRUM	100.3 FM	Orlando, Florida
WRUN	90.3 FM	Remsen, New York
WRUO	88.3 FM	Mayagüez, Puerto Rico
WRUP	98.3 FM	Palmer, Michigan
WRUR-FM	88.5 FM	Rochester, New York
WRUV	90.1 FM	Burlington, Vermont
WRUW-FM	91.1 FM	Cleveland, Ohio
WRVB	102.1 FM	Marietta, Ohio
WRVD	90.3 FM	Syracuse, New York
WRVE	99.5 FM	Schenectady, New York
WRVF	101.5 FM	Toledo, Ohio
WRVH	89.3 FM	Clayton, New York
WRVI	90.5 FM	Allport, Pennsylvania
WRVJ	91.7 FM	Watertown, New York
WRVL	88.3 FM	Lynchburg, Virginia
WRVM	102.7 FM	Suring, Wisconsin
WRVN	91.9 FM	Utica, New York
WRVO	89.9 FM	Oswego, New York
WRVQ	94.5 FM	Richmond, Virginia
WRVR	104.5 FM	Memphis, Tennessee
WRVS-FM	89.9 FM	Elizabeth City, North Carolina
WRVT	88.7 FM	Rutland, Vermont
WRVV	97.3 FM	Harrisburg, Pennsylvania
WRVW	107.5 FM	Lebanon, Tennessee
WRVY-FM	100.5 FM	Henry, Illinois
WRVZ	107.3 FM	Miami, West Virginia
WRWA	88.7 FM	Dothan, Alabama
WRWB-FM	99.3 FM	Ellenville, New York
WRWD-FM	107.3 FM	Highland, New York
WRWN	107.9 FM	Port Royal, South Carolina
WRWR	107.5 FM	Cochran, Georgia
WRWX	91.1 FM	Winchendon, Massachusetts
WRXC	90.1 FM	Shelton, Connecticut
WRXD	96.5 FM	Fajardo, Puerto Rico
WRXK-FM	96.1 FM	Bonita Springs, Florida
WRXL	102.1 FM	Richmond, Virginia
WRXQ	100.7 FM	Coal City, Illinois
WRXR-FM	105.5 FM	Rossville, Georgia
WRXS	106.9 FM	Brookfield, Wisconsin
WRXT	90.3 FM	Roanoke, Virginia
WRXV	89.1 FM	State College, Pennsylvania
WRXX	95.3 FM	Centralia, Illinois
WRXZ	107.1 FM	Briarcliff Acres, South Carolina
WRYC	92.5 FM	Frisco City, Alabama
WRYD	97.7 FM	Jemison, Alabama
WRYN	89.1 FM	Hickory, North Carolina
WRYP	90.1 FM	Wellfleet, Massachusetts
WRYV	88.7 FM	Milroy, Pennsylvania
WRZE	94.1 FM	Kingstree, South Carolina
WRZI	107.3 FM	Hodgenville, Kentucky
WRZK	95.9 FM	Colonial Heights, Tennessee
WRZQ-FM	107.3 FM	Greensburg, Indiana
WRZR	94.5 FM	Loogootee, Indiana
WRZZ	106.1 FM	Parkersburg, West Virginia

== WS ==
Callsign	Frequency	City of license
WSAA	93.1 FM	Benton, Tennessee
WSAE	106.9 FM	Spring Arbor, Michigan
WSAG	104.1 FM	Linwood, Michigan
WSAJ-FM	91.1 FM	Grove City, Pennsylvania
WSAK	102.1 FM	Hampton, New Hampshire
WSAQ	107.1 FM	Port Huron, Michigan
WSAU-FM	99.9 FM	Rudolph, Wisconsin
WSB-FM	98.5 FM	Atlanta
WSBB-FM	95.5 FM	Doraville, Georgia
WSBF-FM	88.1 FM	Clemson, South Carolina
WSBG	93.5 FM	Stroudsburg, Pennsylvania
WSBH	98.5 FM	Satellite Beach, Florida
WSBU	88.3 FM	St. Bonaventure, New York
WSBW	105.1 FM	Ephraim, Wisconsin
WSBX	94.5 FM	Mackinaw City, Michigan
WSBY-FM	98.9 FM	Salisbury, Maryland
WSBZ	106.3 FM	Miramar Beach, Florida
WSCB	89.9 FM	Springfield, Massachusetts
WSCC-FM	94.3 FM	Goose Creek, South Carolina
WSCD-FM	92.9 FM	Duluth, Minnesota
WSCF-FM	91.9 FM	Vero Beach, Florida
WSCH	99.3 FM	Aurora, Indiana
WSCI	89.3 FM	Charleston, South Carolina
WSCL	89.5 FM	Salisbury, Maryland
WSCM	95.7 FM	Baldwin, Wisconsin
WSCN	100.5 FM	Cloquet, Minnesota
WSCR-FM	104.3 FM	Chicago
WSCS	90.9 FM	New London, New Hampshire
WSCT	90.5 FM	Springfield, Illinois
WSCY	106.9 FM	Moultonborough, New Hampshire
WSCZ	93.9 FM	Winnsboro, South Carolina
WSDC	88.5 FM	Sneedville, Tennessee
WSDF	100.5 FM	Louisville, Kentucky
WSDH	91.5 FM	Sandwich, Massachusetts
WSDL	90.7 FM	Ocean City, Maryland
WSDM	90.1 FM	Wadesville, Indiana
WSDP	88.1 FM	Plymouth, Michigan
WSEA	100.3 FM	Atlantic Beach, South Carolina
WSEB	91.3 FM	Englewood, Florida
WSEI	92.9 FM	Olney, Illinois
WSEK-FM	93.9 FM	Burnside, Kentucky
WSEL-FM	96.7 FM	Pontotoc, Mississippi
WSEN	103.9 FM	Mexico, New York
WSEO	107.7 FM	Nelsonville, Ohio
WSEV-FM	105.5 FM	Gatlinburg, Tennessee
WSEW	88.5 FM	Sanford, Maine
WSEY	95.7 FM	Oregon, Illinois
WSFI	88.5 FM	Antioch, Illinois
WSFL-FM	106.5 FM	New Bern, North Carolina
WSFP	88.5 FM	Harrisville, Michigan
WSFQ	96.3 FM	Peshtigo, Wisconsin
WSFR	107.7 FM	Corydon, Indiana
WSFX	89.1 FM	Nanticoke, Pennsylvania
WSGA	92.3 FM	Hinesville, Georgia
WSGC	105.3 FM	Tignall, Georgia
WSGE	91.7 FM	Dallas, North Carolina
WSGG	89.3 FM	Norfolk, Connecticut
WSGL	104.7 FM	Naples, Florida
WSGM	104.7 FM	Coalmont, Tennessee
WSGN	98.3 FM	Stewartville, Alabama
WSGP	88.3 FM	Glasgow, Kentucky
WSGR	88.3 FM	New Boston, Ohio
WSGS	101.1 FM	Hazard, Kentucky
WSGT	107.1 FM	Patterson, Georgia
WSGW-FM	100.5 FM	Carrollton, Michigan
WSHA	89.3 FM	South Charleston, West Virginia
WSHB	90.9 FM	Willard, Ohio
WSHC	89.7 FM	Shepherdstown, West Virginia
WSHD	91.7 FM	Eastport, Maine
WSHF	92.7 FM	Haleyville, Alabama
WSHH	99.7 FM	Pittsburgh, Pennsylvania
WSHJ	88.3 FM	Southfield, Michigan
WSHK	105.3 FM	Kittery, Maine
WSHL-FM	91.3 FM	Easton, Massachusetts
WSHN	89.3 FM	Munising, Michigan
WSHP-FM	103.9 FM	Easley, South Carolina
WSHR	91.9 FM	Lake Ronkonkoma, New York
WSHS	91.7 FM	Sheboygan, Wisconsin
WSHU-FM	91.1 FM	Fairfield, Connecticut
WSHW	99.7 FM	Frankfort, Indiana
WSIA	88.9 FM	Staten Island, New York
WSIE	88.7 FM	Edwardsville, Illinois
WSIF	90.9 FM	Wilkesboro, North Carolina
WSIG	96.9 FM	Mount Jackson, Virginia
WSIM	93.7 FM	Lamar, South Carolina
WSIP-FM	98.9 FM	Paintsville, Kentucky
WSIS	88.7 FM	Riverside, Michigan
WSIU	91.9 FM	Carbondale, Illinois
WSIX-FM	97.9 FM	Nashville, Tennessee
WSIZ-FM	102.3 FM	Jacksonville, Georgia
WSJA	91.3 FM	York, Alabama
WSJD	100.5 FM	Princeton, Indiana
WSJE	91.3 FM	Summersville, West Virginia
WSJH	103.7 FM	Hubbardston, Michigan
WSJK	93.5 FM	Tuscola, Illinois
WSJL	88.1 FM	Bessemer, Alabama
WSJM-FM	94.9 FM	Benton Harbor, Michigan
WSJO	104.9 FM	Egg Harbor City, New Jersey
WSJP-FM	100.1 FM	Port Washington, Wisconsin
WSJQ	91.5 FM	Pascoag, Rhode Island
WSJR	93.7 FM	Dallas, Pennsylvania
WSJY	107.3 FM	Fort Atkinson, Wisconsin
WSKB	89.5 FM	Westfield, Massachusetts
WSKE	104.3 FM	Everett, Pennsylvania
WSKG-FM	89.3 FM	Binghamton, New York
WSKK	102.3 FM	Ripley, Mississippi
WSKL	92.9 FM	Veedersburg, Indiana
WSKQ-FM	97.9 FM	New York City
WSKS	97.9 FM	Whitesboro, New York
WSKU	105.5 FM	Little Falls, New York
WSKV-FM	104.9 FM	Stanton, Kentucky
WSKX	90.7 FM	Christiansted, United States Virgin Islands
WSKY-FM	97.3 FM	Micanopy, Florida
WSKZ	106.5 FM	Chattanooga, Tennessee
WSLC-FM	94.9 FM	Roanoke, Virginia
WSLD	104.5 FM	Whitewater, Wisconsin
WSLE	91.3 FM	Salem, Illinois
WSLG	90.5 FM	Gouverneur, New York
WSLI-FM	90.9 FM	Belding, Michigan
WSLJ	88.9 FM	Watertown, New York
WSLL	90.5 FM	Saranac Lake, New York
WSLM-FM	97.9 FM	Salem, Indiana
WSLO	90.9 FM	Malone, New York
WSLP	93.3 FM	Ray Brook, New York
WSLQ	99.1 FM	Roanoke, Virginia
WSLT	88.5 FM	Statesboro, Georgia
WSLU	89.5 FM	Canton, New York
WSLX	91.9 FM	New Canaan, Connecticut
WSLZ	88.1 FM	Cape Vincent, New York
WSM-FM	95.5 FM	Nashville, Tennessee
WSMA	90.5 FM	Scituate, Massachusetts
WSMB	89.3 FM	Harbor Beach, Michigan
WSMC-FM	90.5 FM	Collegedale, Tennessee
WSMD-FM	98.3 FM	Mechanicsville, Maryland
WSMF	88.1 FM	Monroe, Michigan
WSMI-FM	106.1 FM	Litchfield, Illinois
WSMJ	91.9 FM	North Wildwood, New Jersey
WSMK	99.1 FM	Buchanan, Michigan
WSMO	91.9 FM	Mount Forest, Michigan
WSMR	89.1 FM	Sarasota, Florida
WSMS	99.9 FM	Artesia, Mississippi
WSMW	98.7 FM	Greensboro, North Carolina
WSMX-FM	100.3 FM	Goshen, Alabama
WSMZ-FM	88.3 FM	Crystal Valley, Michigan
WSNC	90.5 FM	Winston-Salem, North Carolina
WSND-FM	88.9 FM	Notre Dame, Indiana
WSNE-FM	93.3 FM	Taunton, Massachusetts
WSNI	97.7 FM	Keene, New Hampshire
WSNN	99.3 FM	Potsdam, New York
WSNO-FM	97.9 FM	Au Sable, New York
WSNT-FM	99.9 FM	Sandersville, Georgia
WSNX-FM	104.5 FM	Muskegon, Michigan
WSNY	94.7 FM	Columbus, Ohio
WSOC-FM	103.7 FM	Charlotte, North Carolina
WSOE	89.3 FM	Elon, North Carolina
WSOF	89.9 FM	Madisonville, Kentucky
WSOG	88.1 FM	Spring Valley, Illinois
WSOH	88.9 FM	Zanesfield, Ohio
WSOL-FM	101.5 FM	Yulee, Florida
WSOM	89.5 FM	Franklin, Indiana
WSOR	90.9 FM	Naples, Florida
WSOS-FM	94.1 FM	Fruit Cove, Florida
WSOU	89.5 FM	South Orange, New Jersey
WSOX	96.1 FM	Red Lion, Pennsylvania
WSOY-FM	102.9 FM	Decatur, Illinois
WSPA-FM	106.3 FM	Simpsonville, South Carolina
WSPB	89.7 FM	Bedford, Michigan
WSPI	89.5 FM	Ellsworth, Illinois
WSPK	104.7 FM	Poughkeepsie, New York
WSPM	89.1 FM	Cloverdale, Indiana
WSPN	91.1 FM	Saratoga Springs, New York
WSPT	97.9 FM	Stevens Point, Wisconsin
WSPX	94.5 FM	Bowman, South Carolina
WSPY-FM	107.1 FM	Plano, Illinois
WSQA	88.7 FM	Hornell, New York
WSQC-FM	91.7 FM	Oneonta, New York
WSQE	91.1 FM	Corning, New York
WSQG-FM	90.9 FM	Ithaca, New York
WSQH	91.7 FM	Decatur, Mississippi
WSQM	90.9 FM	Noblesville, Indiana
WSQN	88.1 FM	Greene, New York
WSQV	92.1 FM	Lock Haven, Pennsylvania
WSQX-FM	91.5 FM	Binghamton, New York
WSRB	106.3 FM	Lansing, Illinois
WSRC	88.1 FM	Waynetown, Indiana
WSRI	88.7 FM	Sugar Grove, Illinois
WSRJ	105.5 FM	Honor, Michigan
WSRK	103.9 FM	Oneonta, New York
WSRM	93.5 FM	Coosa, Georgia
WSRN-FM	91.5 FM	Swarthmore, Pennsylvania
WSRQ-FM	106.9 FM	Zolfo Springs, Florida
WSRS	96.1 FM	Worcester, Massachusetts
WSRT	106.7 FM	Gaylord, Michigan
WSRU	88.1 FM	Slippery Rock, Pennsylvania
WSRV	97.1 FM	Gainesville, Georgia
WSRW-FM	105.7 FM	Grand Rapids, Michigan
WSRZ-FM	107.9 FM	Coral Cove, Florida
WSSB-FM	90.3 FM	Orangeburg, South Carolina
WSSH	89.7 FM	Lisbon, New Hampshire
WSSI	92.7 FM	St. Simons Island, Georgia
WSSK	89.7 FM	Saratoga Springs, New York
WSSL-FM	100.5 FM	Gray Court, South Carolina
WSSM	104.9 FM	Prentiss, Mississippi
WSSQ	105.5 FM	Sterling, Illinois
WSSR	96.7 FM	Joliet, Illinois
WSSU	88.5 FM	Superior, Wisconsin
WSSW	89.1 FM	Platteville, Wisconsin
WSSX-FM	95.1 FM	Charleston, South Carolina
WSTB	88.9 FM	Streetsboro, Ohio
WSTF	91.5 FM	Andalusia, Alabama
WSTG	95.9 FM	Princeton, West Virginia
WSTH-FM	106.1 FM	Alexander City, Alabama
WSTI-FM	105.3 FM	Quitman, Georgia
WSTK	104.5 FM	Aurora, North Carolina
WSTM	91.3 FM	Kiel, Wisconsin
WSTO	96.1 FM	Owensboro, Kentucky
WSTQ	97.7 FM	Streator, Illinois
WSTR	94.1 FM	Smyrna, Georgia
WSTS	100.9 FM	Fairmont, North Carolina
WSTV	104.9 FM	Roanoke, Virginia
WSTW	93.7 FM	Wilmington, Delaware
WSTX-FM	100.3 FM	Christiansted, United States Virgin Islands
WSTZ-FM	106.7 FM	Vicksburg, Mississippi
WSUC-FM	90.5 FM	Cortland, New York
WSUE	101.3 FM	Sault Ste. Marie, Michigan
WSUF	89.9 FM	Noyack, New York
WSUL	98.3 FM	Monticello, New York
WSUM	91.7 FM	Madison, Wisconsin
WSUN	97.1 FM	Holiday, Florida
WSUP	90.5 FM	Platteville, Wisconsin
WSUS	102.3 FM	Franklin, New Jersey
WSUW	91.7 FM	Whitewater, Wisconsin
WSVH	91.1 FM	Savannah, Georgia
WSVO	93.1 FM	Staunton, Virginia
WSVV	101.7 FM	Searsport, Maine
WSVZ	98.3 FM	Tower Hill, Illinois
WSWR	100.1 FM	Shelby, Ohio
WSWS	89.9 FM	Smithboro, Illinois
WSWT	106.9 FM	Peoria, Illinois
WSWW-FM	95.7 FM	Craigsville, West Virginia
WSYC-FM	88.7 FM	Shippensburg, Pennsylvania
WSYE	93.3 FM	Houston, Mississippi
WSYN	103.1 FM	Surfside Beach, South Carolina
WSYR-FM	106.9 FM	Solvay, New York
WSYY-FM	94.9 FM	Millinocket, Maine

== See also ==
- North American call sign
