= U102 =

U102 may refer to:

- German submarine U-102, various vessels
- Small nucleolar RNA SNORD102
- WRKU, a radio station serving Sturgeon Bay, Wisconsin
