= WRVI =

WRVI may refer to:

- WRVI (FM), a radio station (90.5 FM) licensed to serve Allport, Pennsylvania, United States
- WRPV, a radio station (91.1 FM) licensed to serve Saint Mary's, Pennsylvania, which held the call sign WRVI from 2011 to 2019
- WAYK, a radio station (105.9 FM) licensed to serve Valley Station, Kentucky, United States, which held the call sign WRVI from 1987 to 2010
