= WRVN =

Satellite of WRVO, Oswego
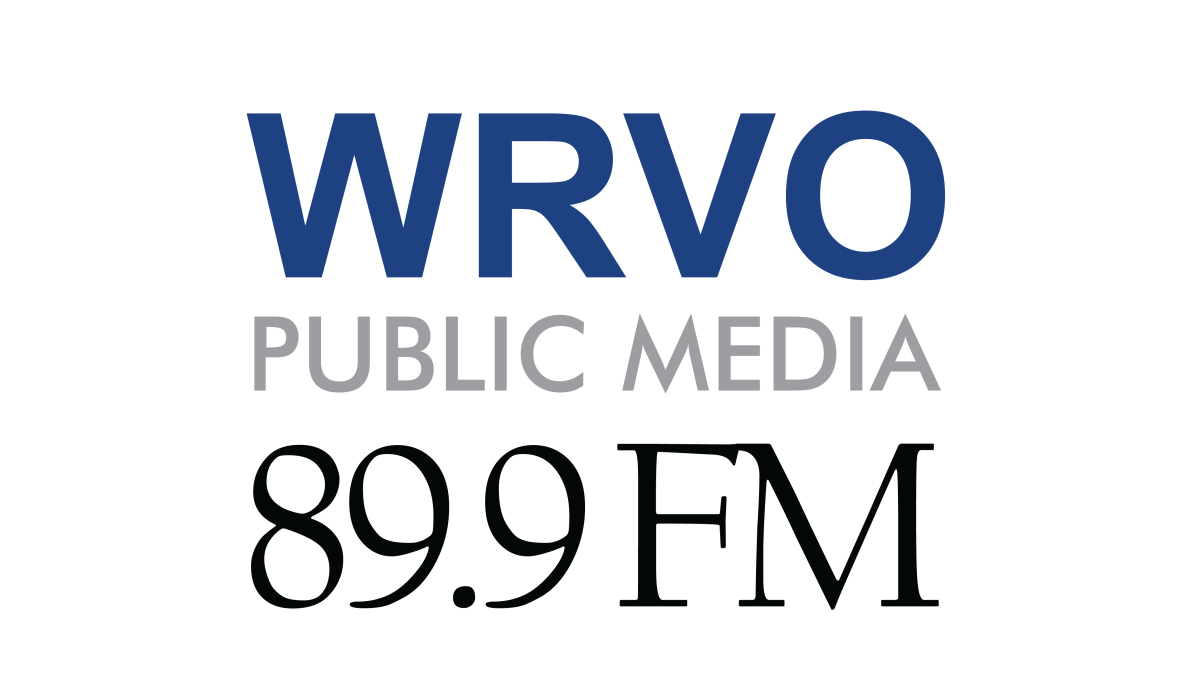
- Utica, New York; United States
- Frequency: 91.9 MHz

Programming
- Format: Public radio

Ownership
- Owner: State University of New York at Oswego; (State University of New York)
- Sister stations: WRVD 90.3, Syracuse; WRVH 89.3 Clayton; WRVJ 91.7, Watertown; WRCU 90.1, Hamilton; WSUC-FM 90.5, Cortland

History
- First air date: 1988
- Former call signs: "WRVO Oneida"

Technical information
- Licensing authority: FCC
- Facility ID: 63130
- Class: A
- ERP: 1,900 watts
- HAAT: −19 metres (−62 feet)
- Transmitter coordinates: 43°08′31″N 75°13′36″W
- Translators: 92.3 W222AT (Hamilton); 99.9 W260BE (Watertown); 106.3 W292DQ (Geneva); 106.5 W293BE (Norwich)

Links
- Public license information: Public file; LMS
- Webcast: Listen Live; DTFX
- Website: www.wrvo.fm

WRVN (91.9 FM) is a member-supported public radio station in Utica, New York. Owned by the State University of New York at Oswego, the station simulcasts the programming of WRVO in Oswego, New York.

Former logo
