= WSUC =

WSUC may refer to:

- WSUC-FM, a radio station (90.5 FM) licensed to Cortland, New York, United States
- New York University College of Arts and Science, formerly Washington Square and University College
- Wisconsin State University Conference, former intercollegiate college athletic conference
