= WRVD =

Satellite of WRVO, Oswego
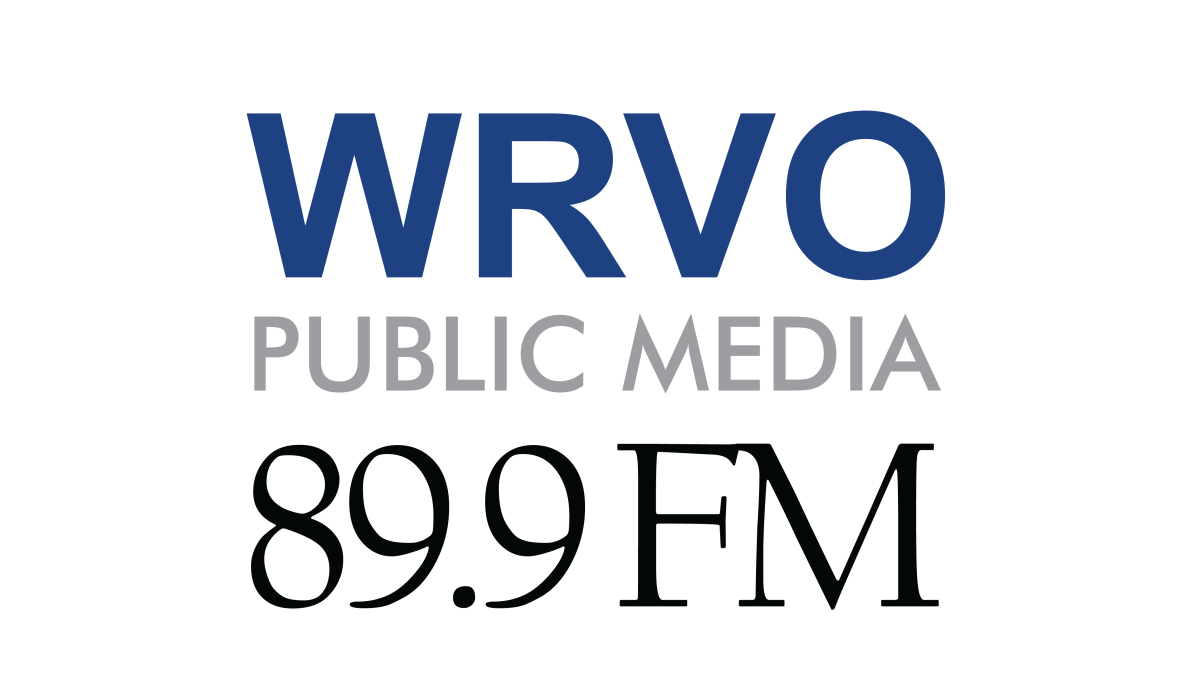
- Syracuse, New York; United States
- Frequency: 90.3 MHz

Programming
- Format: Public radio

Ownership
- Owner: State University of New York at Oswego; (State University of New York)
- Sister stations: WRVO 89.9, Oswego; WRVH 89.3 Clayton; WRVJ 91.7, Watertown; WRVN 91.9, Utica; WRCU 90.1, Hamilton; WSUC-FM 90.5, Cortland

Technical information
- Licensing authority: FCC
- Facility ID: 63131
- Class: A
- ERP: 280 watts
- HAAT: 13 metres (43 feet)
- Transmitter coordinates: 43°02′27″N 76°08′22″W

Links
- Public license information: Public file; LMS
- Webcast: Listen Live; DTFX
- Website: wrvo.fm

WRVD (90.3 FM) is a member-supported public radio station in Syracuse, New York. Owned by the State University of New York at Oswego, the station simulcasts the programming of WRVO in Oswego, New York.

Former logo
