= Maplewood, Wisconsin =

- Unincorporated community
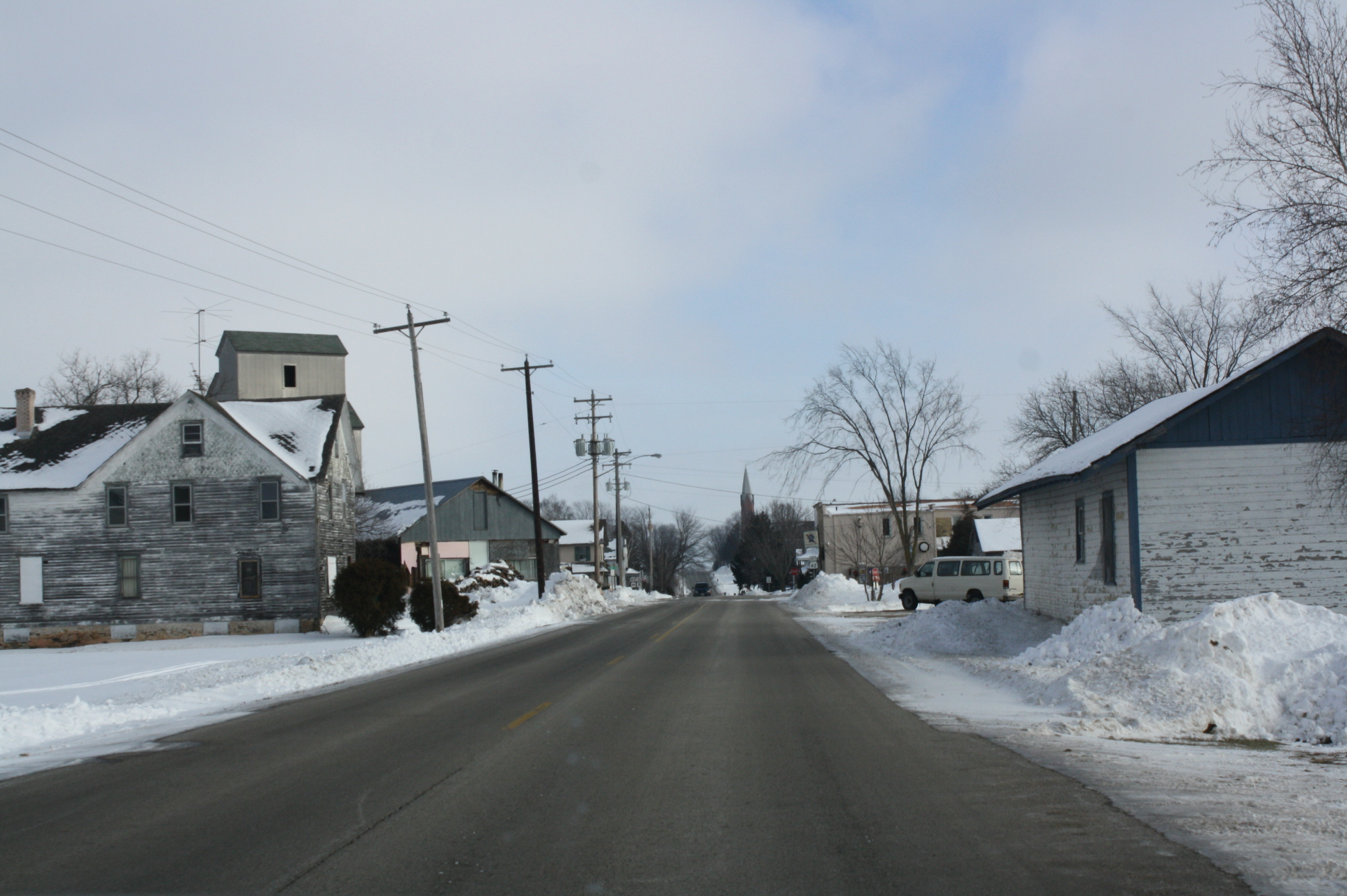
- Looking east in Maplewood

- Location within the state of Wisconsin
- Coordinates: 44°44′51″N 87°28′45″W
- Country: United States
- State: Wisconsin
- County: Door
- Town: Forestville
- Elevation: 702 ft (214 m)
- Time zone: UTC-6 (Central (CST))
  - Summer (DST): UTC-5 (CDT)
- ZIP code: 54226
- Area code: 920
- GNIS feature ID: 1569010

Maplewood is an unincorporated community in Door County, in the town of Forestville, Wisconsin, United States. The nearest city to Maplewood is Sturgeon Bay. Maplewood is located along Wisconsin Highway 42, approximately three miles (5 km) south of its junction with Wisconsin Highway 57. A small county park in the center of Maplewood provides an eating area and restrooms for users of the Ahnapee State Trail.

== Images ==
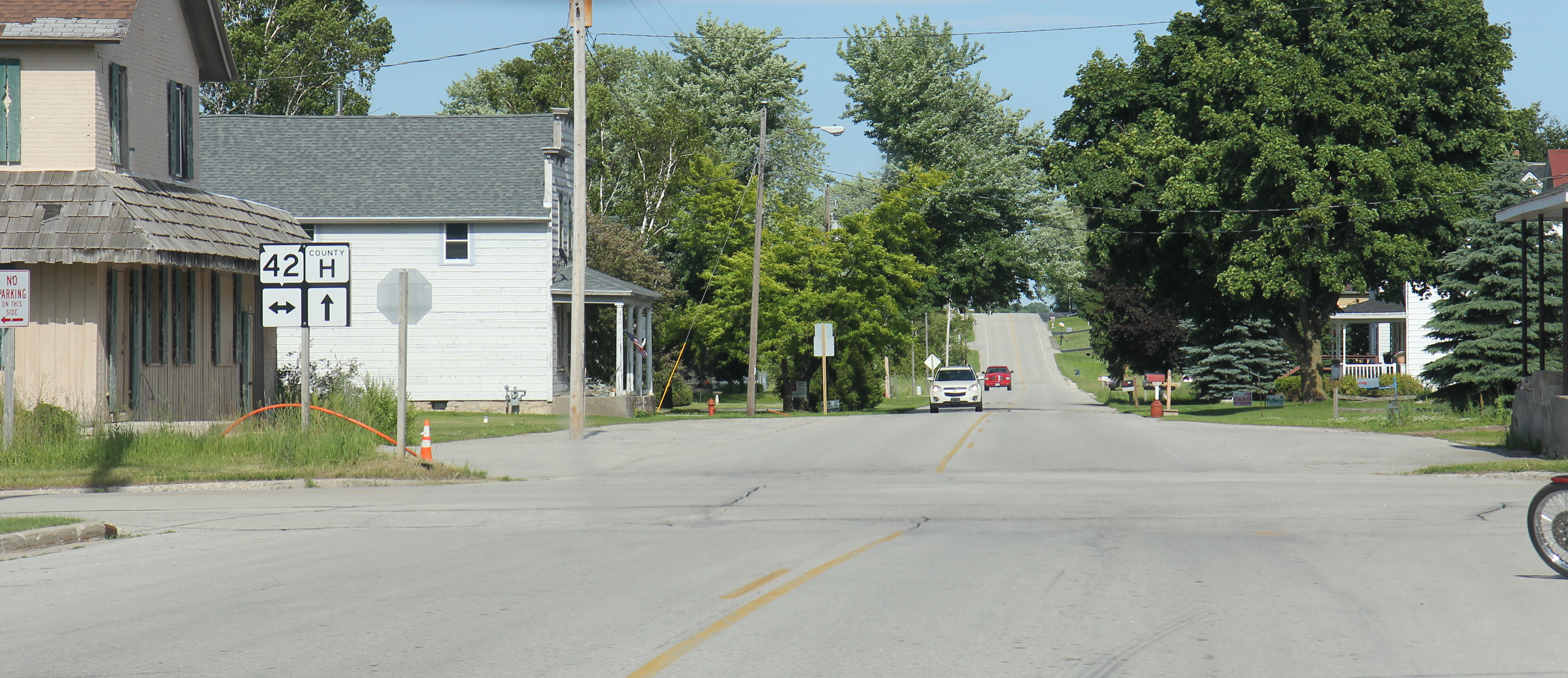
Looking east the main intersection in Maplewood

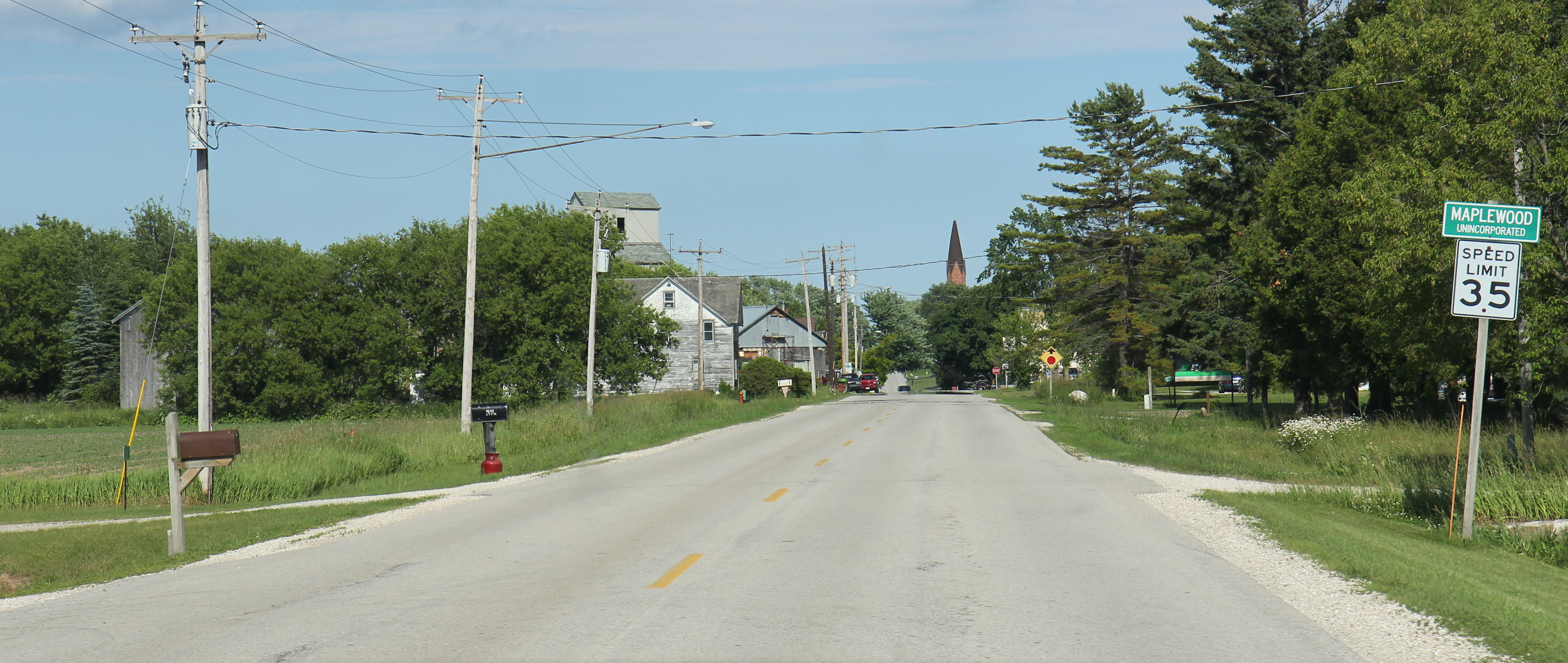
Looking east at the sign for Maplewood

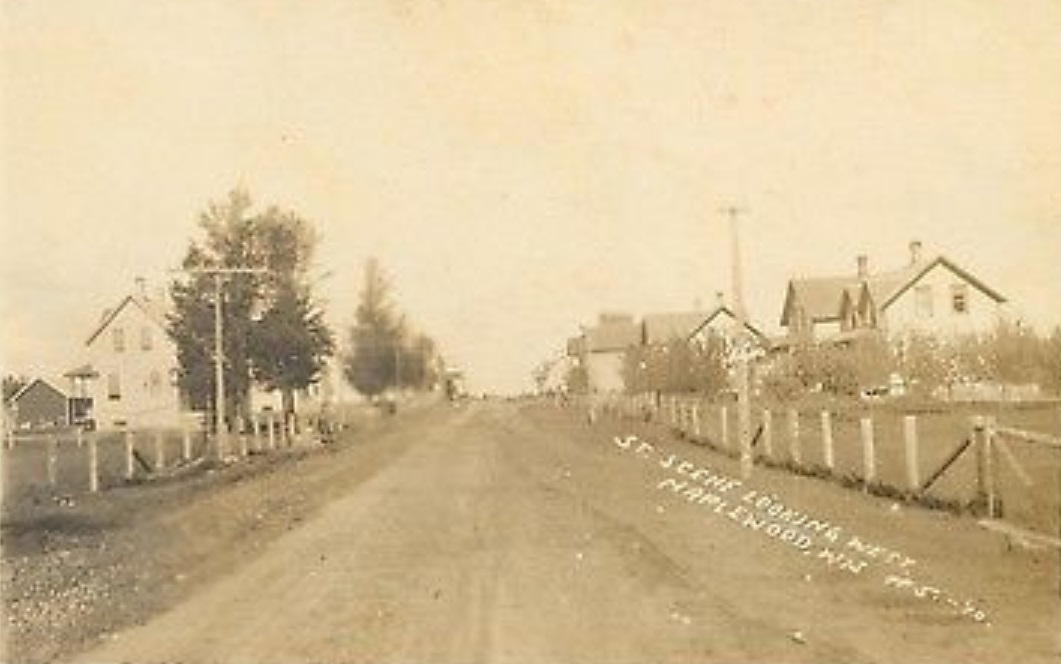
Looking west; postcard dated 1910

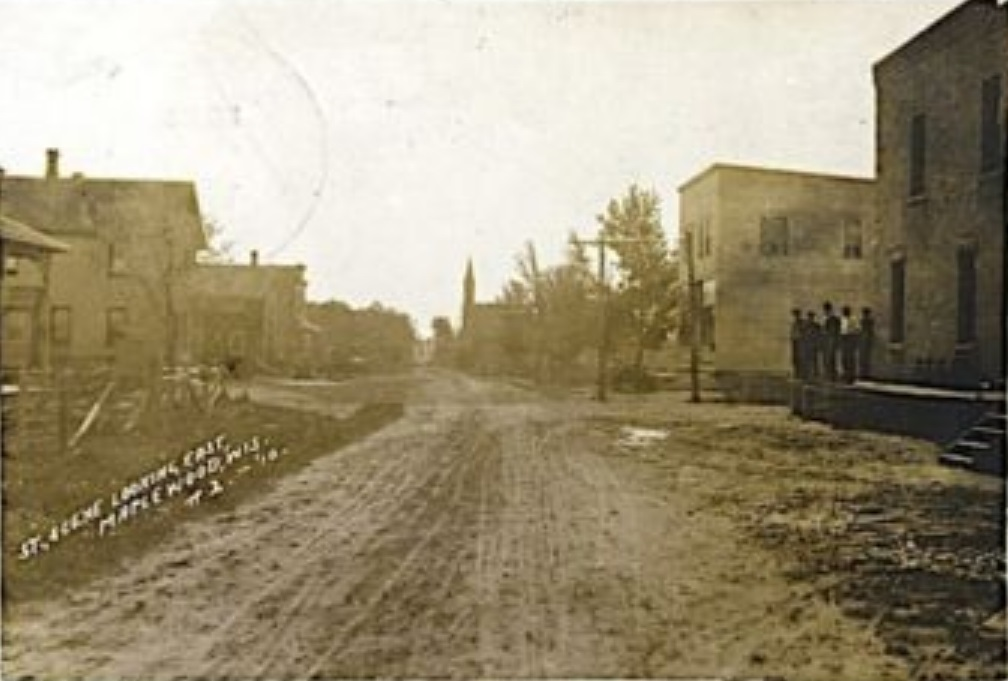
Looking east; postcard dated 1913
