= WMCG =

Coordinates: 32.121°N 83.268°W

- Milan, Georgia; United States
- Frequency: 104.9 MHz
- Branding: Pure Country 104.9

Programming
- Format: Classic Country

Ownership
- Owner: Tel-Dodge Broadcasting Co.
- Sister stations: WDBN; WMLT; WQIL; WQZY

History
- First air date: October 12, 1982

Technical information
- Licensing authority: FCC
- Facility ID: 64757
- Class: C2
- ERP: 36,000 watts
- HAAT: 172 meters

Links
- Public license information: Public file; LMS
- Website: 1049wmcg.com

WMCG (104.9 FM) is a radio station licensed to Milan, Georgia, United States.

Studios for Country 105 were located in Milan, Georgia until being moved to Rochelle, Georgia. At the same time, the station changed its branding to "Power Country 104.9."

Several prominent broadcasters have been associated with the station over the years, notably Jim Ball, Greg Grantham, Hank Brigmond (currently Owner/Agent with The Brigmond Agency, affiliated with Tarkenton Financial), and Rick Knight.
