= Forestville (town), Wisconsin =

Forestville, Wisconsin
- Town
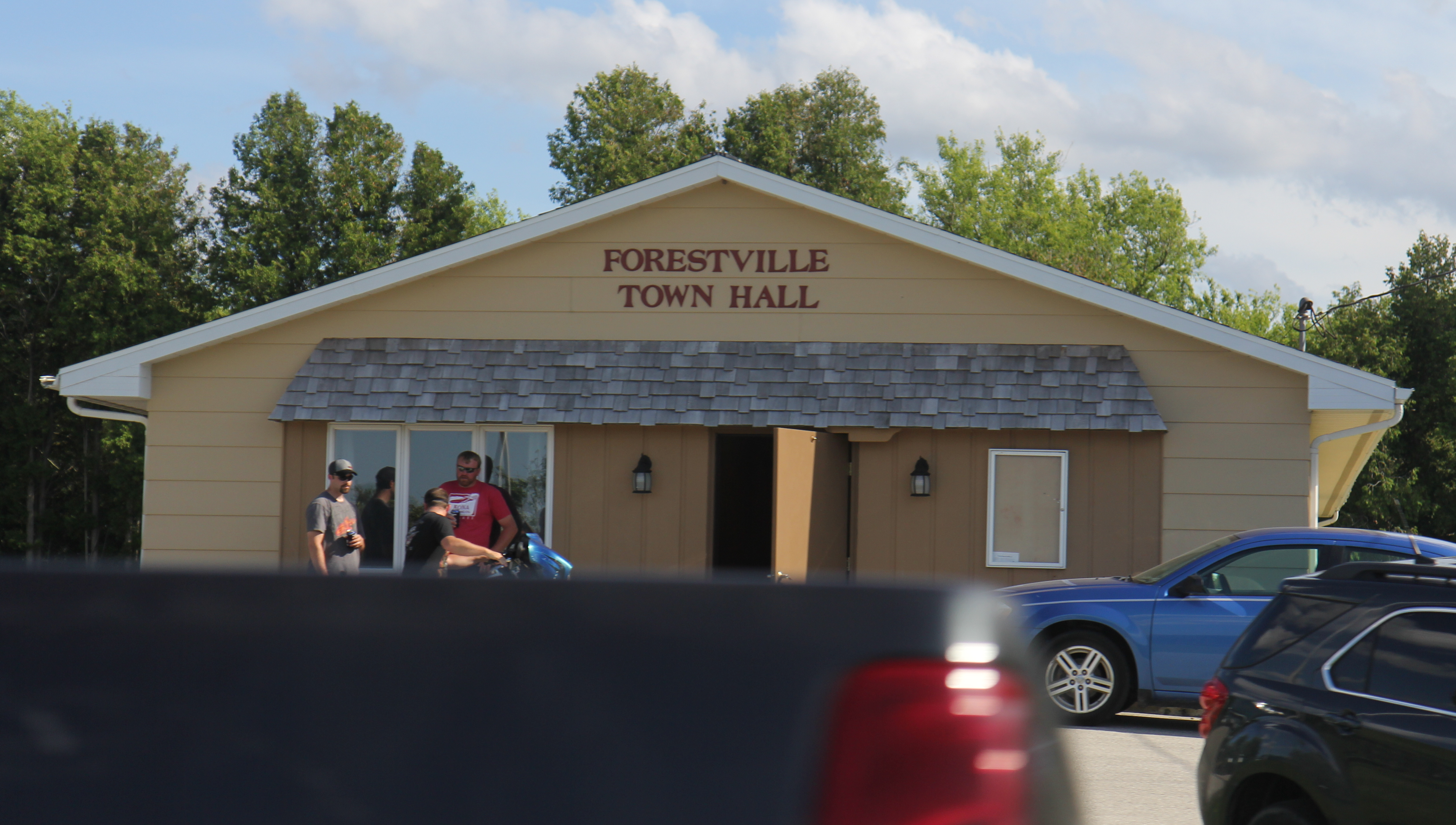
- Town hall

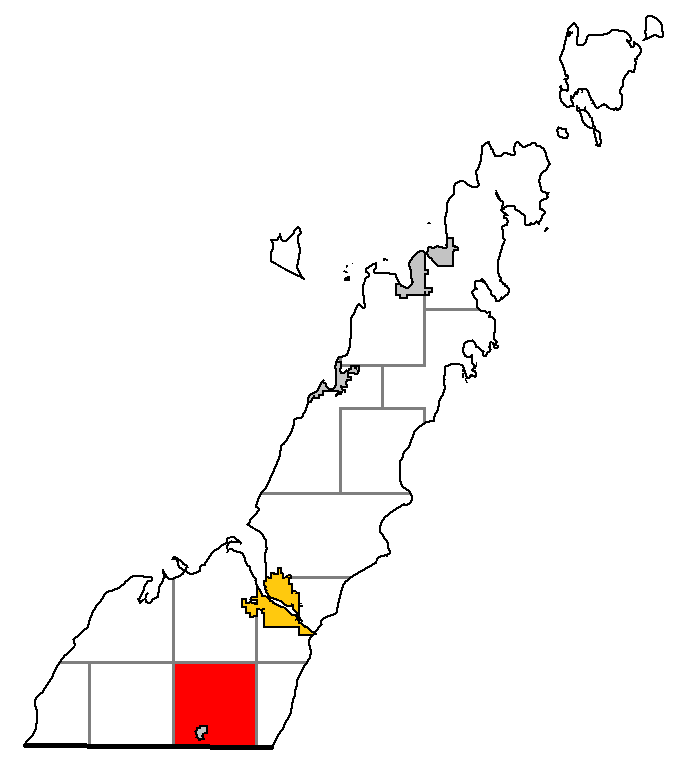
- Location of Forestville, within Door County
- Coordinates: 44°42′55″N 87°28′9″W
- Country: United States
- State: Wisconsin
- County: Door

Area
  - Total: 36 sq mi (92 km^{2})
  - Land: 35.4 sq mi (91.7 km^{2})
  - Water: 0.15 sq mi (0.4 km^{2})
- Elevation: 719 ft (219 m)

Population (2020)
  - Total: 1,063
  - Density: 30.0/sq mi (11.6/km^{2})
- Time zone: UTC-6 (Central (CST))
  - Summer (DST): UTC-5 (CDT)
- Area code: 920
- FIPS code: 55-26650
- GNIS feature ID: 1583218
- Website: https://forestvilletown.wi.gov/

Forestville is a town in Door County, Wisconsin, United States. The population was 1,063 at the 2020 census. The Village of Forestville is located within the town, but the two entities are politically independent.

== Communities ==
- Carnot (/ˈkɑːrnət/ KAR-nət) is an unincorporated community located along Carnot Road about a mile northwest of the County Road S/J intersection.
- Maplewood is an unincorporated community located at the intersection of WIS 42 and County Road H.

== Geography ==
According to the United States Census Bureau, the town has a total area of 35.5 square miles (92 km^{2}), of which 35.4 square miles (91.7 km^{2}) is land and 0.1 square miles (0.4 km^{2}) (0.39%) is water.

== Transportation ==
- Ahnapee State Trail
- Wisconsin Highway 42

== Demographics ==
As of the census of 2000, there were 1,086 people, 387 households, and 313 families residing in the town. The population density was 30.7 people per square mile (11.8/km^{2}). There were 432 housing units at an average density of 12.2 per square mile (4.7/km^{2}). The racial makeup of the town was 97.97% White, 0.18% Black or African American, 0.28% Native American, 0.18% Asian, and 1.38% from two or more races. 0.18% of the population were Hispanic or Latino of any race.

There were 387 households, out of which 40.3% had children under the age of 18 living with them, 68.2% were married couples living together, 5.9% had a female householder with no husband present, and 19.1% were non-families. 16.5% of all households were made up of individuals, and 6.7% had someone living alone who was 65 years of age or older. The average household size was 2.81 and the average family size was 3.14.

In the town, the population was spread out, with 27.7% under the age of 18, 7.9% from 18 to 24, 29.6% from 25 to 44, 23.1% from 45 to 64, and 11.7% who were 65 years of age or older. The median age was 37 years. For every 100 females, there were 110.5 males. For every 100 females age 18 and over, there were 110.5 males.

The median income for a household in the town was $46,818, and the median income for a family was $53,571. Males had a median income of $30,560 versus $21,488 for females. The per capita income for the town was $19,174. About 3.7% of families and 4.5% of the population were below the poverty line, including 3.9% of those under age 18 and 5.6% of those age 65 or over.

== Gallery ==
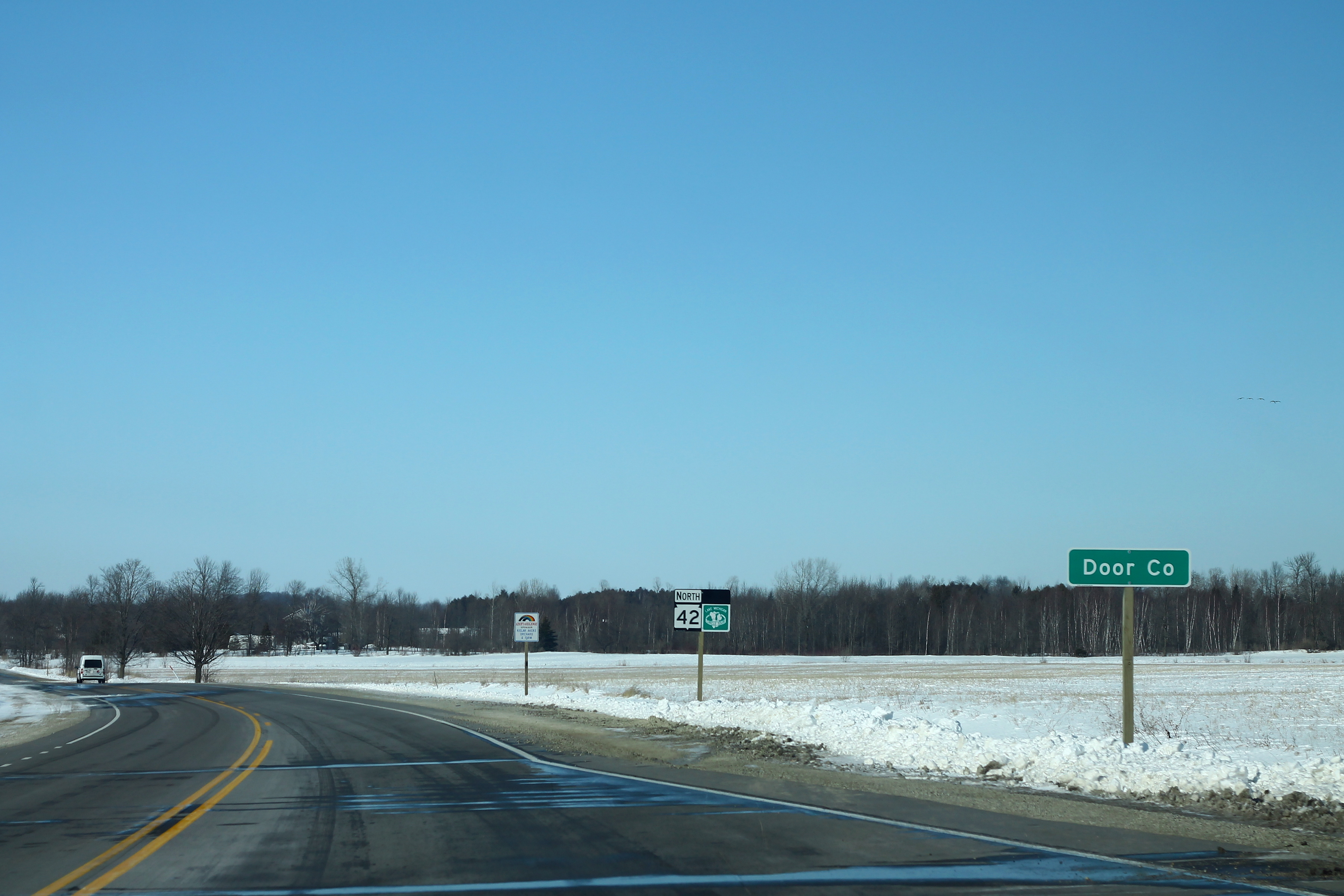
Entering the town from the south on Highway 42

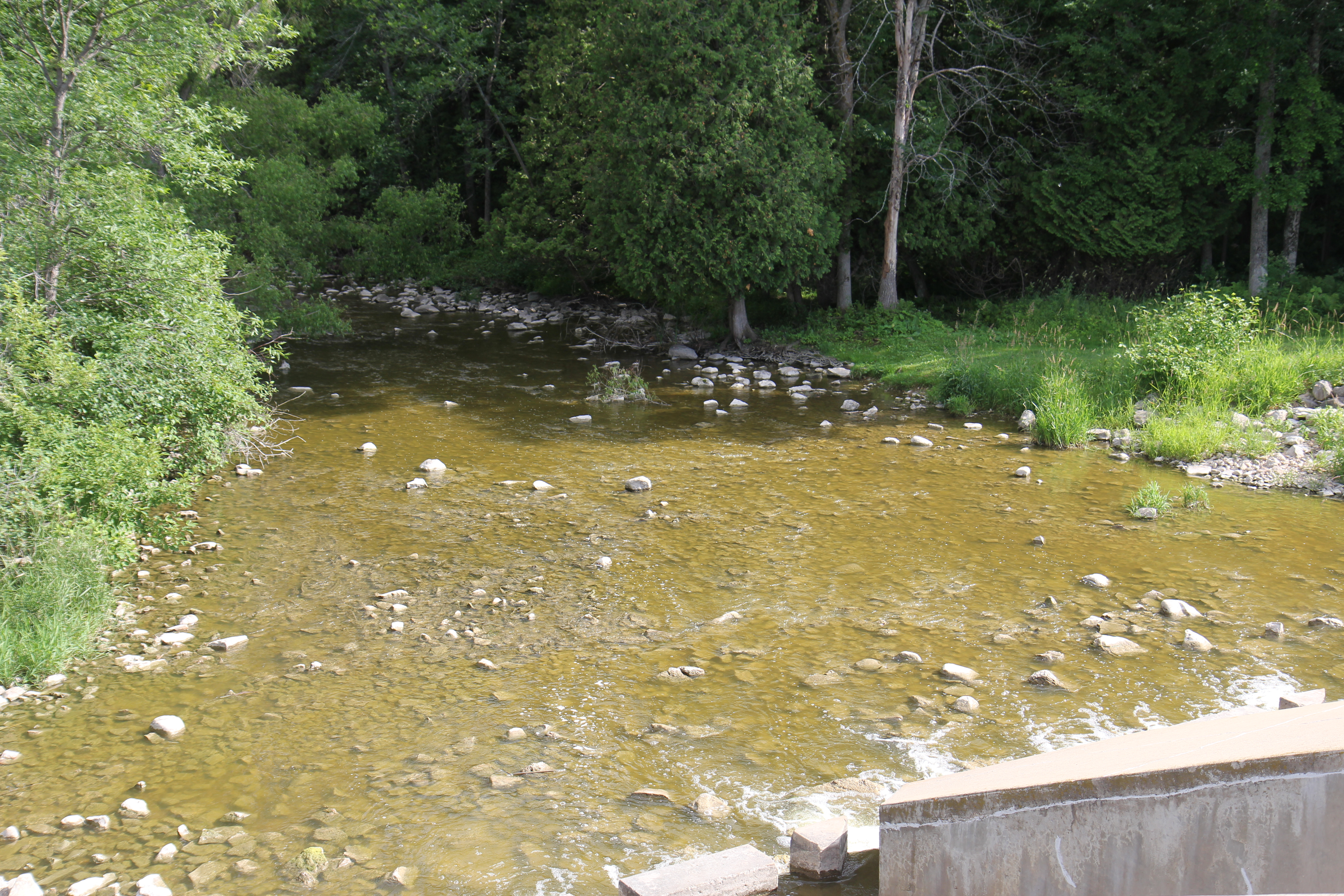
The Ahnapee River below the dam

1914 plat map of the Town of Forestville
