= WMLT =

- Dublin, Georgia; United States
- Frequency: 1330 kHz
- Branding: Faith 96

Programming
- Format: Contemporary Christian

Ownership
- Owner: State Radio License, Inc.
- Sister stations: WDBN; WMCG; WQIL; WQZY

History
- First air date: 1945

Technical information
- Licensing authority: FCC
- Facility ID: 62475
- Class: B
- Power: 1,000 watts day 12 watts night
- Transmitter coordinates: 32°33′49.6″N 82°52′17.5″W
- Translator: 96.9 W245BT (Dublin)

Links
- Public license information: Public file; LMS
- Webcast: Listen Live

WMLT (1330 AM, "Faith 96") is a radio station broadcasting a Contemporary Christian format. Licensed to Dublin, Georgia, United States. The station is currently owned by State Radio License, Inc.

Currently they are branded as Faith 96, probably changed at the same time as WQIL, which changed from Today's Hits Q101.3 to classic rock labeled as "The Buzz".
