= WMVQ =

Fenner, New York; United States
- Broadcast area: Syracuse, New York
- Frequency: 90.5 MHz

Programming
- Format: Public radio

Ownership
- Owner: State University of New York at Oswego; (State University of New York)
- Sister stations: WRVO

History
- First air date: December 21, 1998
- Former call signs: WXXE (1998–2016)

Technical information
- Licensing authority: FCC
- Facility ID: 87460
- Class: A
- ERP: 49 watts
- HAAT: 126.0 meters (413.4 ft)
- Transmitter coordinates: 42°58′12.00″N 75°47′7.00″W

Links
- Public license information: Public file; LMS
- Website: Official website

WMVQ (90.5 FM) is a radio station licensed to State University of New York as part of the WRVO network. WMVQ is licensed to Fenner, New York, which is a rural community in Madison County, in-between the communities of Cazenovia, Chittenango and Canastota, in the Syracuse metropolitan area.

== History ==
WMVQ was originally WXXE, owned by Syracuse Community Radio (SCR), which put the station on the air December 21, 1998, and first licensed the station with the Federal Communications Commission (FCC) on February 11, 2000. SCR had been founded in 1994 to apply for a license to bring community radio to Syracuse's FM dial. The project grew out of organizing by the Westcott Nation Music Association that included micro-radio in the Westcott neighborhood (1990–91) and a community television audio feed on Time Warner Cable. The organization was active for two years before incorporating in 1994.

Effective December 28, 2015, SCR sold WXXE to the State University of New York so they could instead operate WSPJ-LP (103.3 FM), which puts a listenable signal over central and northern Onondaga County, unlike WXXE. Syracuse Community Radio, Inc., was not allowed by FCC regulations to own both stations. WSPJ-LP broadcasts local news and commentary, local music, youth programming and other content. "SCR has consistently provided this programming in the past," it told the FCC, "but over a very limited signal area at the outer fringe of the Syracuse area, resulting in greatly hampered listenership and participation." Because the 103.3 FM signal primarily covers the northern suburbs of Onondaga County, WSPJ-LP is rebroadcast for listeners in the City of Syracuse on 93.7 FM from a translator, W229CU, atop the Westcott Community Center in Syracuse.

WXXE changed its call sign to WMVQ on June 13, 2016.

== See also ==
- List of community radio stations in the United States
