= WBDK =

- Algoma, Wisconsin; United States
- Broadcast area: Green Bay, Wisconsin
- Frequency: 96.7 MHz (HD Radio)
- Branding: 96.7 WBDK

Programming
- Format: Adult contemporary
- Subchannels: HD2: Classic rock

Ownership
- Owner: Bryan Mazur; (Mazur, LLC)
- Sister stations: WRKU, WRLU, WSBW

History
- First air date: November 5, 1986
- Former call signs: WOMA (1986–1992)
- Former frequencies: 96.5 MHz (1986–1992)
- Call sign meaning: Brown, Door, and Kewaunee Counties

Technical information
- Licensing authority: FCC
- Facility ID: 48848
- Class: C3
- ERP: 8,000 watts
- HAAT: 164 meters (538 ft)
- Transmitter coordinates: 44°42′26″N 87°24′26″W
- Translator: HD2: 103.3 W277BP (Sturgeon Bay)

Links
- Public license information: Public file; LMS
- Webcast: Listen live; Listen live (HD2)
- Website: doorcountydailynews.com/wbdk; doorcountydailynews.com/pirate (HD2)

WBDK (96.7 FM) is a radio station broadcasting an adult contemporary format. Licensed to Algoma, Wisconsin, United States, the station serves Brown, Door, and Kewaunee counties. The station is owned by Bryan Mazur, through licensee Mazur, LLC.

WBDK broadcasts in HD Radio and features a classic rock format on its secondary HD2 channel. The HD2 programming is relayed on translator W277BP 103.3 FM, licensed to Sturgeon Bay. W277BP was formerly a translator of religious broadcaster WRVM in Suring, Wisconsin.

== History ==
The station went on the air as WOMA on November 5, 1986, on the 96.5 MHz frequency by D & M Broadcasting. The Docket 80-90 station and was probably the first one of these stations to go on the air. The station struggled for years and was sold in 1989 to Wheeler Broadcasting in Shawano, Wisconsin, who slowly introduced country music format by mixing it with its then-oldies format and progressed to make it all-country. Due to the large distance of other Wheeler Broadcasting holdings in relation to WOMA, Wheeler unloaded it to Nicolet Broadcasting in 1992 for $150,000.

Shortly after the sale, offices were moved to Luxemburg, Wisconsin, to be closer to Green Bay. The format changed to a "soft oldies" (big bands/adult standards of the 1940s through the 1960s). The frequency was later changed to 96.7 MHz in order to increase their broadcast range and call sign changed to the current WBDK.

Nicolet Broadcasting sold WBDK, its translator, and three sister stations to Mazur, LLC effective December 2, 2019, for $1.5 million.
