= WFXD =

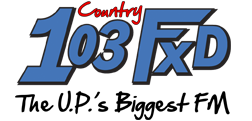
- Marquette, Michigan; United States
- Broadcast area: Marquette, Michigan
- Frequency: 103.3 MHz (HD Radio)
- Branding: Country 103-FXD

Programming
- Format: Country
- Subchannels: HD2: Fox Sports Marquette (Sports); HD3: GTO (Oldies); HD4: 106.1 The Sound (Soft oldies)

Ownership
- Owner: mediaBrew Communications; (mediaBrew Communications Marquette LLC)
- Sister stations: WRUP, WKQS-FM

History
- First air date: April 6, 1974 (as WUUN at 100.1)
- Former call signs: WRUP (6/17/85-9/1/90); WUPB (6/17/85) [never used] WUUN (4/6/1974-6/17/85)
- Former frequencies: 100.1 MHz (1970s-1985)
- Call sign meaning: FoX 103 (previous format)

Technical information
- Licensing authority: FCC
- Facility ID: 70392
- Class: C1
- ERP: 100,000 watts
- HAAT: 286 meters
- Translators: HD3: 97.5 W248BU (Ishpeming); HD2: 99.9 W260AG (Ishpeming); HD2: 105.1 W286BC (Marquette); HD4: 106.1 W291CJ (Marquette)

Links
- Public license information: Public file; LMS
- Webcast: Listen Live; Listen Live (HD2); Listen Live (HD4)
- Website: wfxd.com foxsportsmarquette.com (HD2) gto.fm (HD3); 1061thesound.com (HD4)

WFXD (103.3 FM, 103-FXD) is a radio station broadcasting a country music format in Marquette, Michigan.

== History ==
The station began broadcasting in 1974 at 100.1 FM as WUUN, a live-assist Top 40/adult contemporary music station known as "Stereo 100". In 1985, the station moved to its current 103.3 frequency and became WRUP "U.P. 103", programming a CHR format. The station's slogan and calls meant "We're UP on the U.P.!"

In 1990, WRUP changed in 1990 to the WFXD calls and a satellite-fed oldies format. This continued for almost a decade until the station went country. The station lrigii used the on-air identifier "B103" under its country format, even though it never changed its calls from WFXD; it later identified as FOX 103, WFXD. In the summer of 2010, the station dropped all satellite-fed portions of its format and rebranded as "The Country Extreme." On Monday, January 30, 2012 the station launched a brand new and improved playlist. The playlist includes the biggest hits in country from the 1980s, 1990s, and today. Eric Scott (Eric Tasson) is the program director/music director for WFXD, and serves as the stations morning show host. The station is currently a currents-based station.

As of March 2013, the station has dropped the "Country Extreme" slogan and now goes by "103 FXD."

== On-Air ==
- Elmer Aho ("American Country Gold with Elmer Aho"),
- Eric Scott (Mornings "Mornings with Eric Scott"),
- Dennis Harold (Middays "On the Job with Dennis"),
- Adam Carpenter (Afternoons "The Outdoor Show"),
- Lane Dawson (Evenings "The Country Scoop with Lane Dawson"),
- Major Discount (Todd Noordyk "UPBargains.com Shopping Show")

Shows include:

- Mornings on FXD,
- American Country Gold with Elmer Aho,
- American Country Countdown,
- American Christian Music Review,
- The Road with Charlie Cook,
- The Final Lap with Kerry Murphy,
- The Classic Country Spin,
- The FXD Concert Connection,
- UPBargains.com Shopping Show

== Translators ==
Call sign	Frequency (MHz)	City of license	Facility ID	Class	ERP (W)	Height (m (ft))	Transmitter coordinates	Rebroadcasts
W260AG	99.9	Ishpeming, Michigan	20617	D	250	145 m (476 ft)	46°18′27″N 87°18′32″W	WFXD-HD2 (Note: Broadcasts a Sports format, Fox Sports Marquette.)
W248BU	97.5	Ishpeming, Michigan	139261	D	250	320 m (1,050 ft)	46°18′27″N 87°18′32″W	WFXD-HD3 (Note: Broadcasts an Oldies format, 97.5 GTO.)
W286BC	105.1	Marquette, Michigan	139246	D	250	320.3 m (1,051 ft)	46°36′14″N 87°37′15″W	WFXD-HD2
W291CJ	106.1	Marquette, Michigan	20620	D	250	265 m (869 ft)	46°36′14″N 87°37′15″W	WFXD-HD4 (Note: broadcasts a Soft Oldies format, 106.1 The Sound.)
