= WKQS-FM =

Coordinates: 46.604°N 87.621°W

- Negaunee, Michigan; United States
- Broadcast area: Marquette, Michigan
- Frequency: 101.9 MHz (HD Radio)
- Branding: Sunny.FM; Fox Sports (HD2); GTO (HD3); 106.1 The Sound (HD4)

Programming
- Format: Adult contemporary
- Affiliations: Compass Media Networks; Westwood One

Ownership
- Owner: mediaBrew Communications; (mediaBrew Communications Marquette LLC)
- Sister stations: WRUP, WFXD

History
- First air date: January 5, 1998; 28 years ago

Technical information
- Licensing authority: FCC
- Facility ID: 78161
- Class: C2
- ERP: 13,000 watts
- HAAT: 286 meters

Links
- Public license information: Public file; LMS
- Website: sunny.fm

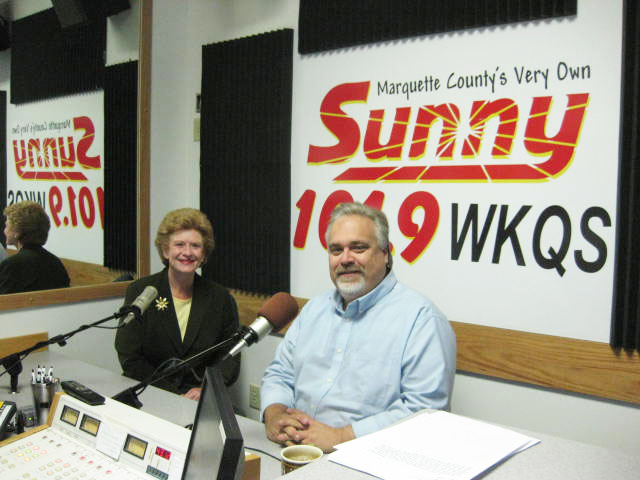
Senator Debbie Stabenow on WKQS-FM

WKQS-FM (101.9 MHz) is a radio station broadcasting a bright mainstream hot adult contemporary format in the Upper Peninsula of Michigan. Licensed to Negaunee, Michigan, and serving the Marquette, Michigan area, it first began broadcasting in 1998.

WKQS is an affiliate of the syndicated "Pop Crush Nights" hosted by Nicole Murray weeknights from 7:00PM - MID.

WKQS was also the home of Mark & Walt in the Morning for 13 years. The duo split up in early February 2012 when Mark accepted an opportunity in Duluth, Minnesota. Mark suggested that Mike Plourde (host of Ishpeming Hematite Sports on sister 98.3 WRUP) could be a potential replacement for mornings on WKQS. Mike Plourde and Walt Lindala joined forces in March 2012 to bring a new morning duo to WKQS called the Sunny Morning Show with Walt and Mike. Evans returned to the station in March 2018 taking over Afternoon Drive, returning to Morning Drive in September 2019. Mark and Walt in The Morning has been recognized four consecutive years for excellence by The Michigan Association of Broadcasters (2019 - 2022) since its return.

WKQS has also been named Station Of The Year 6 times since 2003, including three of the past four years by The MAB.

Recently, Sunny.FM has transitioned into a hot AC outlet under program director Eric Tasson. Most 1980s songs have been dropped during the week; and are now played during the weekend. Sunny.FM is the home for Weekends in the '80s where the station plays all 1980s music all weekend; hence dropping the majority of 1980s songs during the week. The American Top 40 the '80s, hosted by Casey Kasem, airs every Sunday evening at 19:00, to wrap up the 1980s weekends.

WKQS is locally programmed and has local talent around the clock except for Pop Crush Nights and certain syndicated weekend shows. Eric Tasson serves as the program director and music director.

On-air talent includes: Mark Evans, Walt Lindala, Dawn Evans, Tyler Young, Michael J and Nicole Murray. The Daly Download with Carson Daly airs Saturday evenings; John Tesh on Sunday evening.

On March 3, 2020, mediaBrew Communications launched, and 106.1 The Sound on W291CJ and WKQS-FM-HD4 had relaunched with a Soft Oldies format right after stunting with a heartbeat sound effect for a few weeks.

== Sources ==
- Michiguide.com – WKQS-FM History
- Sunny.fm – WKQS-FM
