= WDBN =

Radio station in Wrightsville, Georgia, United States

- Wrightsville, Georgia; United States
- Broadcast area: Dublin, Georgia
- Frequency: 107.9 MHz
- Branding: 107.9 Jamz

Programming
- Format: Urban contemporary
- Affiliations: Premiere Networks

Ownership
- Owner: Dowdy Partners
- Sister stations: WMCG; WMLT; WQIL; WQZY

History
- First air date: August 19, 1985 (as WIML at 107.5)
- Former call signs: WIML (1985–1991)
- Former frequencies: 107.5 MHz (1985–2008)
- Call sign meaning: DuBliN

Technical information
- Licensing authority: FCC
- Facility ID: 15025
- Class: C3
- ERP: 25,000 watts
- HAAT: 100 meters
- Transmitter coordinates: 32°37′5.00″N 82°46′5.00″W

Links
- Public license information: Public file; LMS
- Webcast: Listen Live
- Website: jamz1079.com

WDBN (107.9 FM) is a radio station broadcasting an urban contemporary format. Licensed to Wrightsville, Georgia, United States, it serves the Dublin, Georgia area. The station is currently owned by Dowdy Partners.

(Until 1988, WDBN was the call sign of 94.9 FM based in Medina, Ohio, superseded by WQMX.)

== History ==
The call letters were first used on WDBN "The Quiet Island" broadcasting from Medina, Ohio (originally under license to Barberton, Ohio from 1960-1965) to the Cleveland/Akron/Toledo markets with an ERP of 188 kW at 94.9 FM from 1960 to 1988. The station later went on the air in Dublin, Georgia as WIML at 106.3 MHz on August 19, 1985, as a southern gospel format. On October 20, 1991, the station changed its call sign to the current WDBN and moved to 107.5. On December 8, 2008, the station changed frequencies to 107.9 and increased its power to 25 kW.

On May 6, 2013, WDBN changed their format to urban, branded as "107.9 Jamz", while "The Buzz" classic rock format moved to WMLT AM 1330 and translator W245BT 96.9 FM in Dublin, Georgia.

The classic rock format is now owned by WQIL, who changed from (Today's Hits Q101.3) to (Rock 101.3)
