= WQZY =

- Dublin, Georgia; United States
- Broadcast area: Macon, GA, Augusta, GA
- Frequency: 95.9 MHz
- Branding: Y-96

Programming
- Format: Modern Country music

Ownership
- Owner: State Broadcasting Corporation
- Sister stations: WDBN; WMCG; WMLT; WQIL

History
- First air date: 1976

Technical information
- Licensing authority: FCC
- Facility ID: 62474
- Class: C0
- ERP: 100,000 watts
- HAAT: 312 meters
- Transmitter coordinates: 32°40′42.00″N 82°33′26.00″W

Links
- Public license information: Public file; LMS
- Webcast: Listen Live
- Website: wqzy.com

WQZY (95.9 FM) is a radio station broadcasting a country music format. Licensed to Dublin, Georgia, United States. The station is currently owned by State Broadcasting Corporation and features programming from CNN Radio.
