= WRVO =

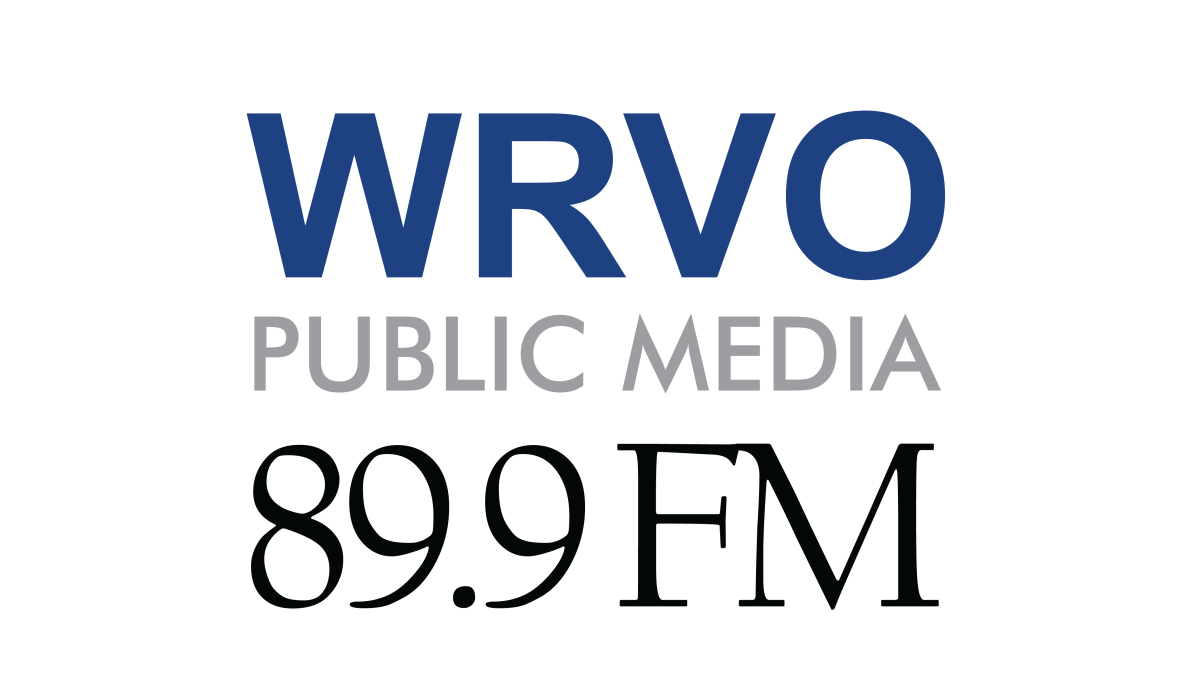
- Oswego, New York; United States
- Frequency: 89.9 MHz
- Branding: WRVO

Programming
- Format: Public radio

Ownership
- Owner: State University of New York at Oswego; (State University of New York)
- Sister stations: WRVD 90.3, Syracuse; WRVH 89.3, Clayton; WRVJ 91.7, Watertown; WRVN 91.9, Utica; WMVQ 90.5, Fenner; WRCU 90.1, Hamilton; WSUC-FM 90.5, Cortland

History
- First air date: 1969
- Call sign meaning: "Radio Voice of Oswego"

Technical information
- Licensing authority: FCC
- Facility ID: 63115
- Class: B
- ERP: 50,000 watts horizontal 49,010 watts vertical
- HAAT: 134 metres (440 feet)
- Transmitter coordinates: 43°25′14.00″N 76°32′39.00″W
- Translators: 88.9 W205CB (Ithaca); 89.9 W210BL (Norwich); 90.7 W214BR (Geneva); 91.5 W219DY (Rome); 104.5 W283BQ (Ithaca)

Links
- Public license information: Public file; LMS
- Webcast: Listen Live
- Website: wrvo.org

WRVO (89.9 FM) is a non-profit public radio network in Oswego, New York, licensed to the State University of New York at Oswego, operating from studios on the bottom floor of the Penfield Library on the SUNY Oswego campus on SR 104 off Rudolph Road. Its multi-station network serves more than 20 counties in central and northern New York from flagship WRVO in Oswego, repeaters WRVD in Syracuse, WRVH in Clayton, WRVN in Utica, and WRVJ in Watertown. Low-power translators serve Geneva, Hamilton, Ithaca, Norwich and Watertown.

Former logo

== Programming ==
WRVO programming includes regional news and public affairs and programming from NPR, American Public Media, Public Radio Exchange, the BBC World Service and other networks. WRVO currently broadcasts Morning Edition, 1A, Fresh Air, Here & Now, All Things Considered, As It Happens, The Capitol Pressroom weeknights. and their old-time radio program, Tuned to Yesterday every night. On the weekend, WRVO broadcasts Travel with Rick Steves, Weekend Edition, Hidden Brain, Wait Wait... Don't Tell Me!, This American Life, On The Media, All Things Considered, The Moth Radio Hour, New Yorker Radio Hour, TED Radio Hour, Campbell Conversations, HealthLink On Air, and more.

From 10:00 pm to midnight every day, WRVO broadcasts Tuned to Yesterday, which consists of radio dramas from the 1930s onward. BirdNote, a two-minute show about the lives of birds, airs on weekdays at 9:58 a.m. StarDate, a two-minute segment with a focus of astronomy and the night sky is heard weekdays at 6:32 p.m.

== Affiliates ==
Location	Frequency	Call sign
Syracuse	90.3 FM	WRVD
Clayton	89.3 FM	WRVH
Watertown	91.7 FM	WRVJ
Utica	91.9 FM	WRVN
Fenner	90.5 FM	WMVQ
Hamilton	90.1 FM	WRCU-FM
Cortland	90.5 FM	WSUC-FM

== Translators ==
Broadcast translators for WRVO
Call sign	Frequency	City of license	FID	ERP (W)	FCC info
W210BL	89.9 FM	Norwich, New York	92871	19	LMS
W214BR	90.7 FM	Geneva, New York	93939	10	LMS
W205CB	88.9 FM	Ithaca, New York	121884	10	LMS
W283BQ	104.5 FM	Ithaca, New York	157181	19	LMS
W219DY	91.5 FM	Rome, New York	138843	150	LMS

Programming may also be heard on WRCU 90.1 FM in Hamilton and WSUC-FM 90.5 FM in Cortland during drive time, off-hours, and during school breaks.

These stations are collectively known as the WRVO Stations.
