= WRPP =

Coordinates: 45.967°N 86.488°W

Simulcasting WHWL Marquette
- Manistique, Michigan; United States
- Broadcast area: Escanaba, Michigan and Manistique, Michigan
- Frequency: 92.7 MHz

Programming
- Format: Religious broadcasting; Christian Talk and Music

Ownership
- Owner: Gospel Opportunities Radio Network

History
- First air date: 2004 (as WPIQ at 99.9)
- Former call signs: WPIQ (2001–2013)
- Former frequencies: 99.9 MHz (2004–2007)

Technical information
- Licensing authority: FCC
- Facility ID: 88444
- Class: C1
- ERP: 51,000 watts
- HAAT: 243 meters (797 ft)
- Translators: W254AG (98.7 MHz, Escanaba)

Links
- Public license information: Public file; LMS
- Website: The Gospel Opportunities Radio Network

WRPP (92.7 FM) is a radio station broadcasting a Christian talk and music format. Licensed to Manistique, Michigan, it first began broadcasting in 2004. WRPP's transmitter is located off of County Road 442 just north of the town of Cooks, Michigan in the southwestern corner of Schoolcraft County. The station transmits its signal from an antenna 772 feet high with an effective radiated power of 24,500 watts and can be heard from St. Ignace all the way to Escanaba and Marquette in Michigan's Upper Peninsula.

WPIQ first began broadcasting in 2004 under the frequency of 99.9 FM. In November 2007, the frequency was changed to 92.7 FM. In 2010 the station raised its power, enabling it to be heard over much more of the Upper Peninsula and across the lake in northern Lower Michigan.

In June 2013, after changing its call sign from WPIQ to WRPP, the station changed format from talk to classic rock, simulcasting WRUP 98.3 FM Palmer, Michigan. Programming was derived from Cumulus Media's The Classic Rock Experience format.

In August 2026, Gospel Opportunities Radio Network purchased the frequency and its tower from former owners Aurora Media, LLC.

As of November 2026, WHWL serves the Marquette area while WRPP provides a strong signal to the Escanaba area.

== Previous Logos ==
As WPIQ

As WRUP Classic Rock
