= WRSN =

- Lebanon, Tennessee; United States
- Frequencies: 88.1 MHz; Channel 201
- Branding: Risen Radio

Programming
- Format: Roman Catholic
- Affiliations: EWTN

Ownership
- Owner: Risen Radio, Inc.
- Sister stations: WRIM (Cookeville)

History
- Call sign meaning: W RiSeN

Technical information
- Licensing authority: FCC
- Facility ID: 176028
- Class: A
- ERP: 185 watts
- HAAT: 92.4 meters
- Transmitter coordinates: 36°17′36.3″N 86°15′27″W
- Repeaters: WRIM 89.9: Cookeville, Tennessee

Links
- Public license information: Public file; LMS
- Website: risenradio.org

WRSN/88.1 is an FM radio station licensed to Lebanon, Tennessee. It airs a Catholic religious format. It was assigned the WRSN callsign on November 20, 2008.

== Repeater ==
- 89.9
