= German submarine U-102 =

U-102 may refer to one of the following German submarines:

- SM U-102, a Type U 57 submarine launched in 1917 and that served in the First World War until sunk between 28 and 30 September 1918
  - During the First World War, Germany also had these submarines with similar names:
    - SM UB-102, a Type UB III submarine launched in 1918 and surrendered on 22 November 1918; broken up at La Spezia in July 1919
    - SM UC-102, a Type UC III submarine launched in 1918 and surrendered on 22 November 1918; broken up at Dordrecht in 1922
- German submarine U-102 (1940), a Type VIIB submarine that served in the Second World War until sunk on 1 July 1940
