= WRUP =

Coordinates: 46.604°N 87.621°W

- Palmer, Michigan; United States
- Broadcast area: Marquette, Michigan
- Frequencies: 98.3 MHz; 92.7 MHz (WRPP)
- Branding: 98.3 WRUP Real Classic Rock

Programming
- Format: Classic rock

Ownership
- Owner: mediaBrew Communications; (mediaBrew Communications Marquette LLC)
- Sister stations: WKQS-FM, WFXD

History
- First air date: June 21, 1974 (as WQXO-FM)
- Former call signs: WQXO (1974-6/15/1979); WQXO-FM (6/15/1979-2/7/1992); WHCH (2/7/1992-1/5/2005)
- Call sign meaning: Classic Rock Upper Peninsula

Technical information
- Licensing authority: FCC
- Facility ID: 41825
- Class: C3
- ERP: 2,600 watts
- HAAT: 310.2 meters

Links
- Public license information: Public file; LMS
- Website: wrup.com

WRUP (98.3 FM) is a radio station licensed to Palmer, Michigan in Northern Upper Peninsula broadcasting a satellite-fed classic rock format from Jones Radio Networks. The station was previously a country and then an oldies station (as WHCH "Hot Country Hits" and then "Oldies 98") before changing over to the current format. The station transmits its signal from an antenna 1,018 feet in height atop a hill located northwest of Marquette and broadcasts with an effective radiated power of 2,600 watts. WRUP's transmitter was moved in October 2008 to Marquette County from Munising where it had been located since the station first went on the air in 1974.

As WQXO-FM, the station in the early 1970s simulcast the MOR/adult contemporary format of AM sister WGON (later and now WQXO) during the day, and aired beautiful music during non-simulcast dayparts. By the early 1980s, WQXO-AM/FM were simulcast 24/7 with an adult contemporary format. This was followed in the early 1990s by the WHCH calls and country and then oldies music, and then the current calls and format.

The WRUP calls were previously used in Marquette, Michigan in the 1980s on 103.3 FM as "UP 103"; the station is now WFXD.

WRUP broadcasts Ishpeming Hematites high school sports and Michigan State University college sports. WRUP was the Marquette affiliate for the Packers Radio Network, broadcasting all Green Bay Packers games. That affiliation now resides with WUPZ.

WRUP Previous Logo

== Sources ==
- Great Lakes Radio - WRUP-FM
