= WRXV =

Coordinates: 40.732°N 78.326°W

RevFM Flagship Station

State College, Pennsylvania; United States
- Frequency: 89.1 MHz
- Branding: "Central PA's Rev FM"

Programming
- Format: Christian contemporary
- Affiliations: RevFM

Ownership
- Owner: Invisible Allies Ministries

Technical information
- Licensing authority: FCC
- Facility ID: 91941
- Class: B1
- ERP: 600 watts
- HAAT: 332 meters
- Translator: See § Translators

Links
- Public license information: Public file; LMS
- Website: revfm.net

WRXV in State College, Pennsylvania is a Christian contemporary music formatted radio station owned by Invisible Allies Ministries. It serves the State College and Altoona markets. It is branded as "Central PA's own Rev FM". WRXV is the flagship station of the Pennsylvania Christian contemporary network RevFM.

== Translators ==
Broadcast translators for WRXV
Call sign	Frequency	City of license	FID	ERP (W)	HAAT	Class	FCC info
W274BE	102.7 FM	Altoona, Pennsylvania	10960	9	397.3 m (1,303 ft)	D	LMS
W207CN	89.3 FM	Tyrone, Pennsylvania	154681	250	327 m (1,073 ft)	D	LMS
