= WRKU =

- Forestville, Wisconsin; United States
- Broadcast area: Sturgeon Bay, Wisconsin
- Frequency: 102.1 MHz
- Branding: U102.1

Programming
- Format: Hot adult contemporary

Ownership
- Owner: Bryan Mazur; (Mazur, LLC)
- Sister stations: WBDK, WRLU, WSBW

History
- First air date: 1999

Technical information
- Licensing authority: FCC
- Facility ID: 85794
- Class: A
- ERP: 2,600 watts
- HAAT: 152 meters (499 ft)
- Transmitter coordinates: 44°42′26″N 87°24′26″W

Links
- Public license information: Public file; LMS
- Webcast: Listen live
- Website: doorcountydailynews.com/u1021

WRKU (102.1 FM, "U102.1") is a radio station broadcasting a hot adult contemporary format. Licensed to Forestville, Wisconsin, United States, the station serves Door and Kewaunee counties. The station is currently owned by Bryan Mazur, through licensee Mazur, LLC.

In September 2021, WRKU rebranded as "U102.1".
