= WRLU =

- Algoma, Wisconsin; United States
- Broadcast area: Sturgeon Bay, Wisconsin
- Frequency: 104.1 MHz
- Branding: 104.1 WRLU

Programming
- Format: Country
- Affiliations: Green Bay Gamblers

Ownership
- Owner: Bryan Mazur; (Mazur, LLC)
- Sister stations: WRKU, WBDK, WSBW

History
- First air date: August 1, 1999

Technical information
- Licensing authority: FCC
- Facility ID: 85829
- Class: A
- ERP: 2,400 watts
- HAAT: 158.0 meters (518.4 ft)
- Transmitter coordinates: 44°42′26″N 87°24′26″W

Links
- Public license information: Public file; LMS
- Webcast: Listen live
- Website: doorcountydailynews.com/wrlu

WRLU (104.1 FM) is a radio station broadcasting a mainstream country format. Licensed to serve Algoma, Wisconsin, United States, the station serves Door and Kewaunee counties. The station is owned by Bryan Mazur, through licensee Mazur, LLC.
