= WSBW =

- Ephraim, Wisconsin; United States
- Broadcast area: Sturgeon Bay, Wisconsin
- Frequency: 105.1 MHz
- Branding: 105.1 The Goat

Programming
- Format: Variety hits

Ownership
- Owner: Bryan Mazur; (Mazur, LLC)
- Sister stations: WRKU, WRLU, WBDK

History
- First air date: 2007

Technical information
- Licensing authority: FCC
- Facility ID: 165986
- Class: A
- ERP: 3,100 watts
- HAAT: 142 meters (466 ft)
- Transmitter coordinates: 45°14′5″N 87°5′27″W

Links
- Public license information: Public file; LMS
- Webcast: Listen live
- Website: doorcountydailynews.com/thegoat

WSBW (105.1 FM; "The Goat") is a radio station broadcasting a locally programmed variety hits format. Licensed to Ephraim, Wisconsin, United States, the station is owned by Bryan Mazur, through licensee Mazur, LLC.

The WSBW call letters were formerly used by 99.7 FM in Sturgeon Bay, Wisconsin.

On March 12, 2020, WSBW changed its format from classic country to variety hits, branded as "105.1 The Goat".
