= WQIL =

- Chauncey, Georgia; United States
- Frequency: 101.3 MHz
- Branding: Rock 101.3

Programming
- Format: Mainstream rock

Ownership
- Owner: GSW, Inc.
- Sister stations: WDBN; WMCG; WMLT; WQZY

History
- First air date: 1992

Technical information
- Licensing authority: FCC
- Facility ID: 25477
- Class: C2
- ERP: 50,000 watts
- HAAT: 150 meters
- Transmitter coordinates: 32°22′59.00″N 83°7′8.00″W

Links
- Public license information: Public file; LMS
- Webcast: Listen Live

WQIL (101.3 FM) is a radio station broadcasting a mainstream rock format. Licensed to Chauncey, Georgia, United States, the station is currently owned by GSW, Inc.

On September 9, 2016, WQIL changed their format from contemporary Christian (branded as "Faith FM") to adult hits, branded as "Smash Hits 101.3", catering to Smash Hits from the 80s and 90s.

On November 16, 2017, WQIL changed their format from adult hits to top 40/CHR, branded as "Q101.3".

It appears that at midnight March 3, 2023, they have changed to The Buzz which plays eighties rock music.

A few days later they changed their name back to Q101.3, yet still use the rock genre.

They have again changed their name to Rock 101.3.
