= Forestville, Wisconsin =

- Village
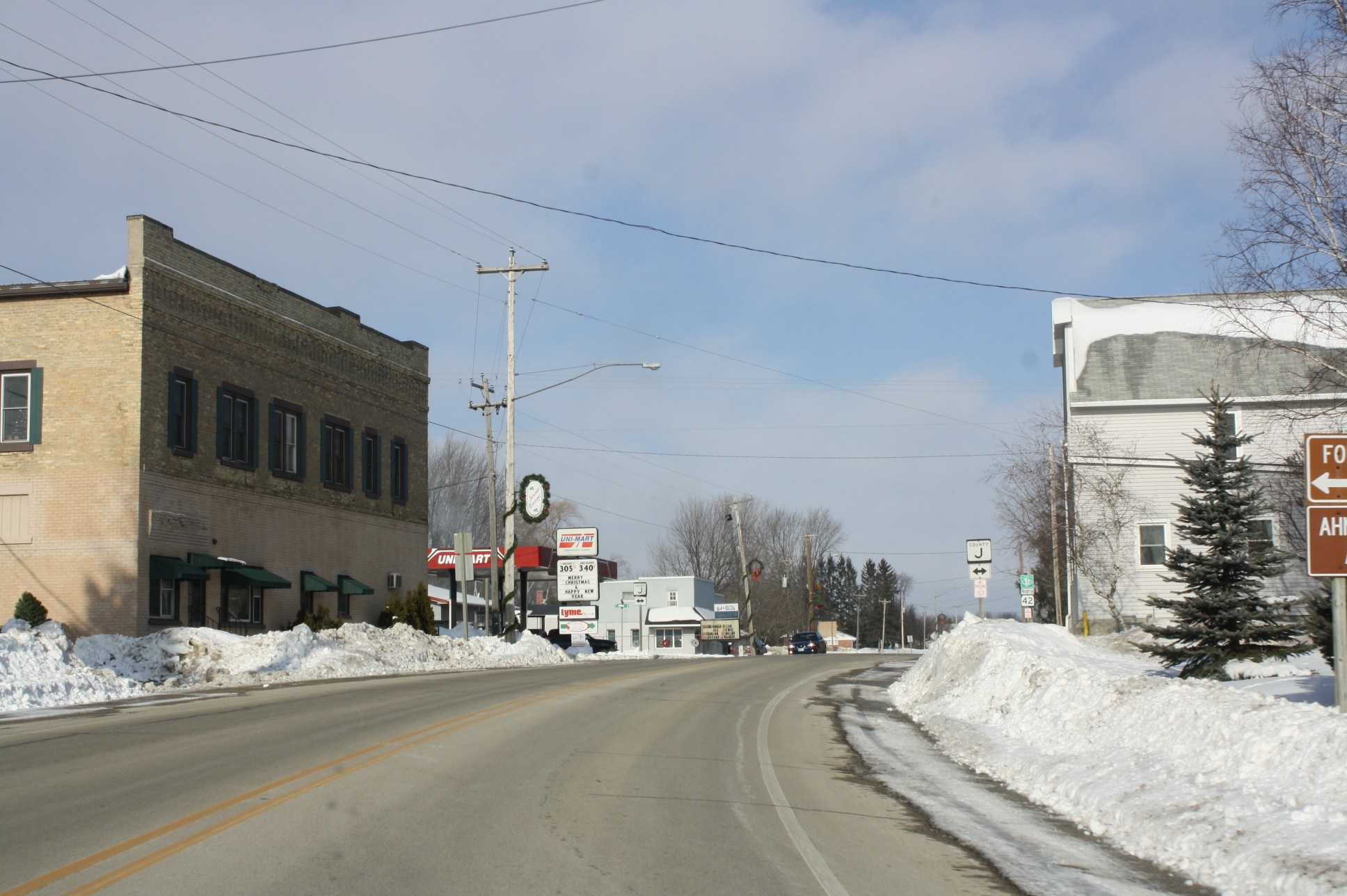
- Looking north at downtown Forestville

- Location of Forestville in Door County, Wisconsin.
- Coordinates: 44°41′22″N 87°28′50″W
- Country: United States
- State: Wisconsin
- County: Door

Area
  - Total: 0.52 sq mi (1.35 km^{2})
  - Land: 0.52 sq mi (1.35 km^{2})
  - Water: 0 sq mi (0.00 km^{2})
- Elevation: 719 ft (219 m)

Population (2020)
  - Total: 482
  - Density: 925/sq mi (357/km^{2})
- Time zone: UTC-6 (Central (CST))
  - Summer (DST): UTC-5 (CDT)
- ZIP code: 54213
- Area code: 920
- FIPS code: 55-26625
- Website: Village of Forestville

Forestville is a village in Door County, Wisconsin, United States, along the Ahnapee River. The population was 482 at the 2020 census. The village is located within the Town of Forestville. The village uses the 54213 ZIP code. The Ahnapee State Trail passes through the village on the southwest.

== History ==
Major Joseph McCormick was the first white man to settle in Forestville. He was of Scotch-Irish descent. He won his military title in the Mexican War. He discovered what he thought was a layer of marble. McCormick is responsible for bringing a great many settlers to Forestville. He spoke persuasively of the marble quarries, the water power, and the timber resources.

== Geography ==
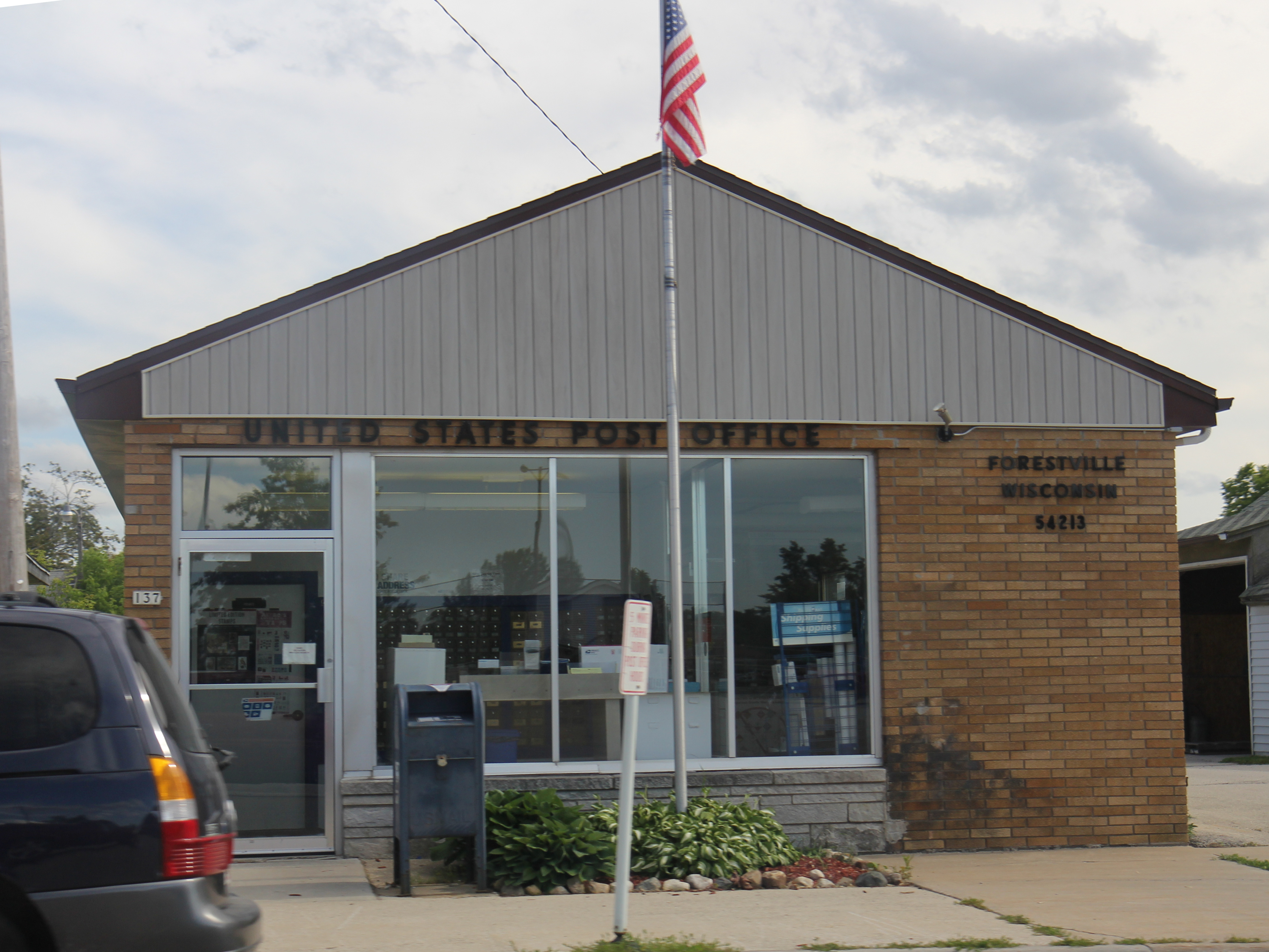
Post office

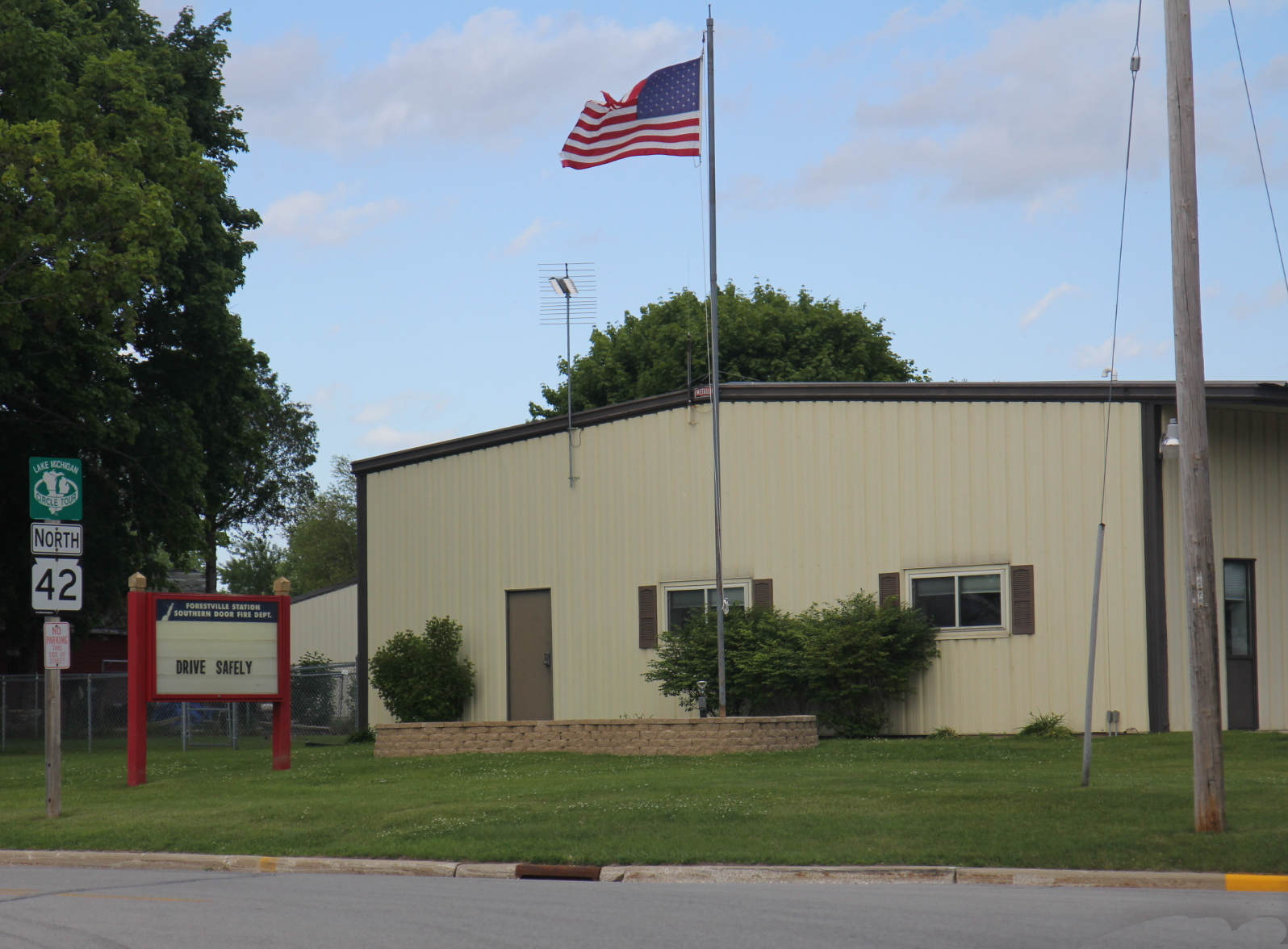
Southern Door fire department station in Forestville

Forestville is located at 44°41′22″N 87°28′50″W (44.689462, -87.480758).

According to the United States Census Bureau, the village has a total area of 0.52 square miles (1.35 km^{2}), all land.

== Demographics ==
Historical population
Census	Pop.	Note	%±
1970	349		—
1980	455		30.4%
1990	470		3.3%
2000	429		−8.7%
2010	430		0.2%
2020	482		12.1%
U.S. Decennial Census

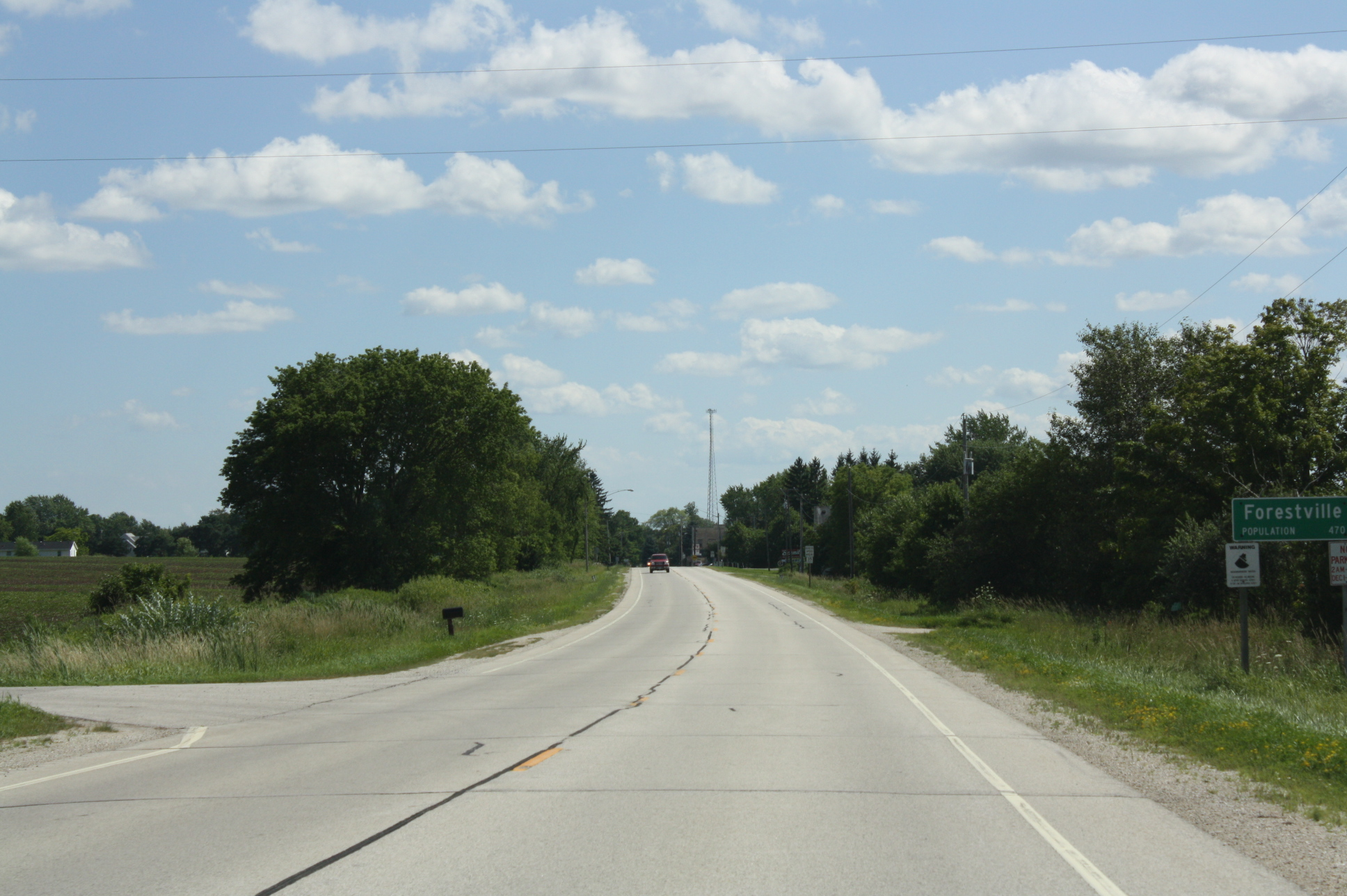
Looking south at the sign for Forestville

=== 2010 census ===
As of the census of 2010, there were 430 people, 183 households, and 129 families living in the village. The population density was 826.9 inhabitants per square mile (319.3/km^{2}). There were 206 housing units at an average density of 396.2 per square mile (153.0/km^{2}). The racial makeup of the village was 98.1% White, 0.7% Native American, and 1.2% from two or more races. Hispanic or Latino of any race were 1.9% of the population.

There were 183 households, of which 33.9% had children under the age of 18 living with them, 56.8% were married couples living together, 9.3% had a female householder with no husband present, 4.4% had a male householder with no wife present, and 29.5% were non-families. 24.0% of all households were made up of individuals, and 9.8% had someone living alone who was 65 years of age or older. The average household size was 2.35 and the average family size was 2.78.

The median age in the village was 43.6 years. 20.7% of residents were under the age of 18; 6.8% were between the ages of 18 and 24; 25.4% were from 25 to 44; 29.1% were from 45 to 64; and 18.1% were 65 years of age or older. The gender makeup of the village was 49.3% male and 50.7% female.

=== 2000 census ===
As of the census of 2000, there were 429 people, 181 households, and 120 families living in the village. The population density was 823.7 people per square mile (318.5/km^{2}). There were 202 housing units at an average density of 387.8 per square mile (150.0/km^{2}). The racial makeup of the village was 99.07% White, 0.70% Black or African American, and 0.23% from two or more races. 0.00% of the population were Hispanic or Latino of any race.

There were 181 households, out of which 29.3% had children under the age of 18 living with them, 55.8% were married couples living together, 7.7% had a female householder with no husband present, and 33.7% were non-families. 30.9% of all households were made up of individuals, and 17.1% had someone living alone who was 65 years of age or older. The average household size was 2.37 and the average family size was 2.92.

In the village, the population was spread out, with 22.6% under the age of 18, 7.0% from 18 to 24, 28.7% from 25 to 44, 24.5% from 45 to 64, and 17.2% who were 65 years of age or older. The median age was 41 years. For every 100 females, there were 96.8 males. For every 100 females age 18 and over, there were 94.2 males.

The median income for a household in the village was $39,167, and the median income for a family was $50,313. Males had a median income of $31,146 versus $19,688 for females. The per capita income for the village was $16,521. About 1.7% of families and 7.4% of the population were below the poverty line, including 1.0% of those under age 18 and 23.0% of those age 65 or over.

== Climate ==
Forestville, WI

Climate chart (precipitation, max. and min. temperature)
J	F	M	A	M	J	J	A	S	O	N	D
40 −4 −12	28 −2 −11	43 4 −6	76 10 0	83 17 7	94 23 12	88 26 15	86 25 14	79 21 10	77 14 4	53 6 −2	44 −1 −8
- █ Average max. and min. temperatures in °C
- █ Precipitation totals in mm
Imperial conversion
J	F	M	A	M	J	J	A	S	O	N	D
1.6 26 10	1.1 28 12	1.7 39 21	3 51 33	3.3 63 44	3.7 73 54	3.5 79 59	3.4 78 58	3.1 70 50	3 56 39	2.1 43 29	1.7 31 18
- █ Average max. and min. temperatures in °F
- █ Precipitation totals in inches
