= RevFM =

Network of Christian radio stations in Pennsylvania

- Type: Radio network
- Country: United States

Programming
- Format: Contemporary Christian music / Christian adult contemporary

Ownership
- Owner: Invisible Allies Ministries

Coverage
- Availability: Pennsylvania

Links
- Website: revfm.net

RevFM is a network of Christian radio stations in Pennsylvania, broadcasting contemporary Christian music and Christian adult contemporary.

RevFM is currently heard on five full powered stations and a few low powered translators.

== Stations ==
Call sign	Frequency	City of license	Facility ID	Class	ERP (W)	Height (m (ft))	Notes
WRVI	90.5 FM	Allport, Pennsylvania	175137	B1	1,600	270 m (890 ft)	—
WRYV	88.7 FM	Milroy, Pennsylvania	172732	B1	2,200	265 m (869 ft)	—
WRPV	91.1 FM	Ridgway, Pennsylvania	176200	A	240	92 m (302 ft)	—
WRQV	88.1 FM	Ridgway, Pennsylvania	175421	B1	2,100	249 m (817 ft)	—
WRXV (Note: Flagship station; for this station's translators, see WRXV § Translators)	89.1 FM	State College, Pennsylvania	91941	B1	600	332 m (1,089 ft)	—
WRYV-FM1	88.7 FM	State College, Pennsylvania	189706	D	23	294 m (965 ft)	Booster for WRYV
