= WRCU-FM =

Coordinates: 42.811°N 75.532°W

- Hamilton, New York; United States
- Broadcast area: Central New York
- Frequency: 90.1 FM

Programming
- Format: Multi-format, freeform
- Affiliations: WRVO

Ownership
- Owner: Colgate University

History
- First air date: 1951
- Call sign meaning: "Radio Colgate University"

Technical information
- Licensing authority: FCC
- Class: A
- ERP: 1,900 watts
- HAAT: 47 meters

Links
- Public license information: Public file; LMS
- Webcast: Listen live
- Website: wrcufm.org

WRCU-FM (90.1 FM) is Colgate University's student-run radio station. It is located in Hamilton, New York, and broadcasts a wide variety of music to the central New York region.

== Format ==
Like many college radio stations, WRCU's main format is freeform, specializing in independent rock music, jazz, hip-hop, and world music. However, the station also has a large variety of specialty show formats, covering genres from metal to Celtic music. WRCU also has a handful of talk shows, covering sports and politics.

When the station is not on the air, late at night and during school breaks, it simulcasts WRVO, the local NPR affiliate.

== History ==
According to alumni, the first movement for radio at Colgate was in 1913, where the "Radio Club of Colgate" was formed by students who were interested in communications. The station started in the 1950s by a handful of students who were merely tinkering with random parts. They began broadcasting on AM (600 & 640 kHz) using carrier current on the campus under the call letters WCU. The call sign was changed to WRCU in 1958 and coverage was expanded over the Hamilton community by broadcasting over the town's power lines. The station acquired a license from the Federal Communications Commission (FCC) to broadcast as an FM station, with the call letters WRCU-FM in 1970.

== Famous alumni ==
- Joe Castiglione
- Lin Brehmer

== Executive Board ==
WRCU is managed by an executive board which consists of current students. The current board members are: Maxwell Walker, Sam Chittick, Maya Khadem, Taylor Crabtree, Eli Senzel, Eleanor Nguyen, Ben Yanni, Helen Reichert, Wyatt Thompson, and Ama Nkrumah.
