= WSUC-FM =

- Cortland, New York; United States
- Frequency: 90.5 MHz
- Branding: 90.5 WSUC The Dragon

Programming
- Format: Variety
- Affiliations: WRVO

Ownership
- Owner: State University of New York at Cortland

History
- First air date: November 29, 1976
- Former call signs: WCSU-AM
- Call sign meaning: State University of New York at Cortland

Technical information
- Licensing authority: FCC
- Facility ID: 63111
- Class: A
- ERP: 210 watts
- HAAT: −18 m (−59 ft)
- Transmitter coordinates: 42°35′48″N 76°11′23″W

Links
- Public license information: Public file; LMS
- Webcast: Listen Live
- Website: web.cortland.edu/wsuc/

WSUC-FM (90.5 FM) is a college radio station broadcasting a variety format from the State University of New York at Cortland (SUNY Cortland). The station is owned and licensed by the State University of New York at Cortland in Cortland, New York, United States.

== History ==
WSUC-FM went on the air officially on November 29, 1976. Prior to becoming WSUC-FM, the university radio station broadcast in AM with the call sign WCSU. The station had expected to retain the WCSU call sign but the FCC's FM license application required 5 potential call sign choices.

The five choices given on the application were WCSU, WMLF (Station Manager Michael Flaster's initials), WCJL (Corey Leibow, the Program Director's initials), WRTC (the Chief Engineer, Dick Crozier's initials), and as a joke, WSUC. It turned out the first 4 had already been assigned so the station was assigned WSUC for its FM license.

Shortly after the negative exposure garnered by record fines levied against the station by the F.C.C. in 1993, the station underwent a major restructure and overhaul. Following the FCC fine, an inspection of the broadcast studios found the station to be in a state of disrepair and neglect. Crozier was soon ousted as Chief Engineer. Tim Backer, current Director of Engineering for Galaxy Communications, was brought into oversee redesign and repairs to the station's broadcasting infrastructure as well both broadcast and production studios. Repairs and upgrades to the station were completed in 1994.

== FCC Notice of Apparent Liability ==
On January 7, 1993, the radio station was fined $23,750 by the FCC for a June 21, 1992, mid-afternoon broadcast which included the uncensored version of the lead single "Yo-Da-Lin in the Valley" from the Kid Rock album Grits Sandwiches for Breakfast and the explicit lyrics version of "I'm Not Your Puppet" from the Hi-C album Skanless.

At the time, this was the largest fine the FCC had ever levied against a non-commercial radio station for a violation of the commission's "obscenity, indecency, and profanity" regulations.

The university appealed the $23,750 fine stating that the fine was excessive and that due to a lack of a playlist and with no identifying announcements on the recording submitted to the FCC, SUNY was unable to ascertain if the alleged broadcast had actually aired on WSUC.

SUNY also argued that it had been discovered shortly after the alleged broadcast that the student DJ who was logged on the transmitter at the date and time of the alleged broadcast had also stolen station equipment and forged purchase orders.

According to a certified arrest report provided to the FCC, the student was criminally convicted, sentenced and later officially banned from the SUNY Cortland campus on threat of criminal trespass.

On July 28, 1998, the FCC fine was reduced to $4,200.

== See also ==
- College radio
- List of college radio stations in the United States
