= WCSJ =

WCSJ may refer to:

- WCSJ-FM, a radio station (103.1 FM) licensed to Morris, Illinois, United States
- WAUR (AM), a radio station (1550 AM) licensed to Somonauk, Illinois, which held the call sign WCSJ from 1963 to 2022
- Willard Carroll Smith Jr., American actor and rapper (born 1968)
