= WBTA =

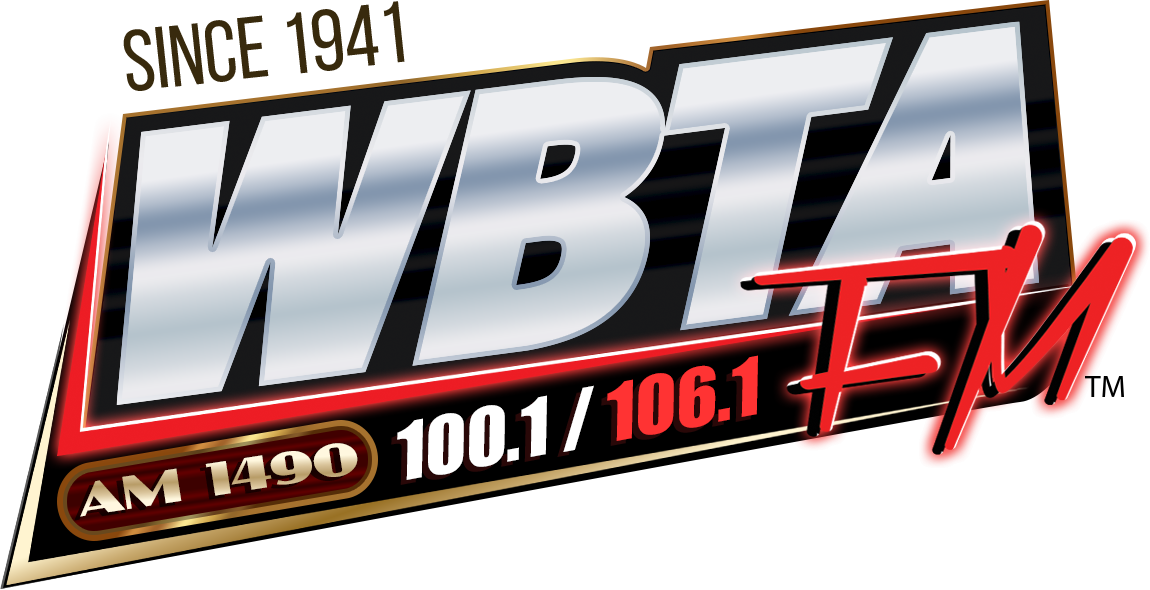
- Batavia, New York; United States
- Broadcast area: Rochester area
- Frequency: 1490 kHz
- Branding: WBTA 100.1 FM, 1490 AM, and 106.1 FM in Le Roy

Programming
- Format: Soft adult contemporary

Ownership
- Owner: James Ernst; (Majic Tones Communications, LLC)

History
- First air date: February 6, 1941
- Call sign meaning: What Batavia Talks About (1960's), Batavia

Technical information
- Licensing authority: FCC
- Facility ID: 31811
- Class: C
- Power: 1,000 watts day; 710 watts night
- Transmitter coordinates: 42°58′35″N 78°11′12″W
- Translators: 100.1 W261CR (Batavia); 106.1 W291DI (Le Roy)

Links
- Public license information: Public file; LMS
- Webcast: Listen live
- Website: wbtai.com

WBTA (1490 AM) is a radio station broadcasting a soft adult contemporary format. Licensed to Batavia, New York, United States, the station is the only one directly serving Genesee County and in general serves the area between Rochester and Buffalo. The station is owned by James Ernst, through licensee Majic Tones Communications, LLC. It was broadcasting ABC Music Radio's "Timeless" format (and, before 2006, its predecessor "Unforgettable Favorites"), but as of February 13, 2010; the current format is aired locally.

Wayne Fuller was a longtime personality at the station, working there from 1967 until shortly before his death in 2018. Morning host Jerry Warner died a few months later.
