= WSPY =

WSPY may refer to:

- WSPY-FM, a radio station (107.1 FM) licensed to serve Plano, Illinois, United States
- WSPY-LD, a low-power television station (channel 30, virtual 31) licensed to serve Earlville, Illinois
- WDYS (AM), a radio station (1480 AM) licensed to serve Somonauk, Illinois, United States, which held the call sign WSPY from 2002 to 2021
- WLPD-LP, a low-power television station (channel 30) licensed to serve Plano, Illinois, which held the call sign WSPY-LP from 1997 to 2013
- WLPD-CD, a low-power television station (channel 32, virtual 30) licensed to serve Plano, Illinois, which held the call signs WSPY-LD or WSPY-CD from 2011 to 2013
