= WSQR =

Radio station in Sycamore, Illinois

Coordinates: 42°00′24″N 88°40′40″W

- Sycamore, Illinois; United States
- Broadcast area: DeKalb County–Northern Illinois
- Frequency: 1180 kHz
- Branding: 92.9 The Q

Programming
- Format: Classic hits

Ownership
- Owner: Nelson Multimedia Inc.
- Sister stations: WDYS, WSPY-FM, WAUR

History
- First air date: June 11, 1981 (at 1560)
- Former frequencies: 1560 kHz (1981–2006)
- Call sign meaning: Approximate abbreviation for its city of license of Sycamore

Technical information
- Licensing authority: FCC
- Facility ID: 16409
- Class: D
- Power: 900 watts day; 1 watt night
- Translators: (92.9 MHz) W225CC (Sycamore); (100.5 MHz) W263BM (DeKalb); (102.5 MHz) W273CZ (Plano)

Links
- Public license information: Public file; LMS
- Website: www.wlbkradio.com

WSQR (1180 AM) is a radio station broadcasting a classic hits format. Licensed to Sycamore, Illinois, the station is owned by Nelson Multimedia Inc. WSQR also broadcasts on FM translators W225CC 92.9 Sycamore, W263BM 100.5 DeKalb, and W273CZ 102.5 Plano.

== History ==
WSQR began broadcasting on June 11, 1981, and was owned by Hometown Communications. The station originally broadcast at 1560 kHz, running 250 watts during daytime hours only. The station originally aired a MOR-adult contemporary format, with the slogan "Welcome to Our Sunshine". A year later, the station began airing a country music format. In spring 1989, the station began airing an oldies format. In late 1990, the station switched back to a country music format.

In 1993, after being silent, the station adopted a modern rock format, while temporarily being run by Northern Illinois University students. The station again went silent in January 1994.

In 1994, the station was sold to Larry and Pamela Nelson. The station returned to the air at 6 AM on December 5, 1994, airing soft adult contemporary music from Jones Radio Networks, along with local news and information. The station was branded "The Spirit of DeKalb County". The station added nighttime operations in 1996, running 17 watts. In August 1999, the station's format was changed to adult standards, carrying Timeless Favorites programming from ABC.

WSQR moved to 1180 kHz in late 2006. WSQR continued carrying Timeless network programming from Citadel Broadcasting until the network's shutdown in February 2010 when it adopted a classic hits format (from Citadel's Classic Hits network). WSQR returned to the adult standards format in late summer of 2011, airing Dial Global's America's Best Music, but in November 2012 switched back to classic hits from the Dial Global network.

February 2025 - WSQR studios has moved to the station's owners main studio in Plano Illinois.
