= KKOA =

- Volcano, Hawaii; United States
- Broadcast area: Hilo, Hawaii
- Frequency: 102.7 MHz

Programming
- Format: Country
- Affiliations: Today's Best Country (ABC Radio)

Ownership
- Owner: Hawai'i Island Radio; (Hawai'i Island Radio Corporation)
- Sister stations: KOPI, KHNU

History
- First air date: 1979

Technical information
- Licensing authority: FCC
- Repeaters: 102.7 KKOA-FM1 (Hilo); 106.9 KKOA-FM3 (Kailua-Kona)

Links
- Public license information: Public file; LMS
- Website: www.hawaiiradio.com

KKOA (102.7 FM) is a radio station broadcasting a country music format. Licensed to Volcano, Hawaii, United States, the station serves the Hilo area. The station is owned by Hawai'i Island Radio and features programming from ABC Radio's "Today's Best Country" satellite feed.

In January 2024, the station moved from 107.7 FM to 102.7 FM.
