= WCFL (FM) =

Christian radio station in Morris, Illinois, United States

Coordinates: 41.3547541°N 88.4986806°W

Simulcasts WBGL, Champaign
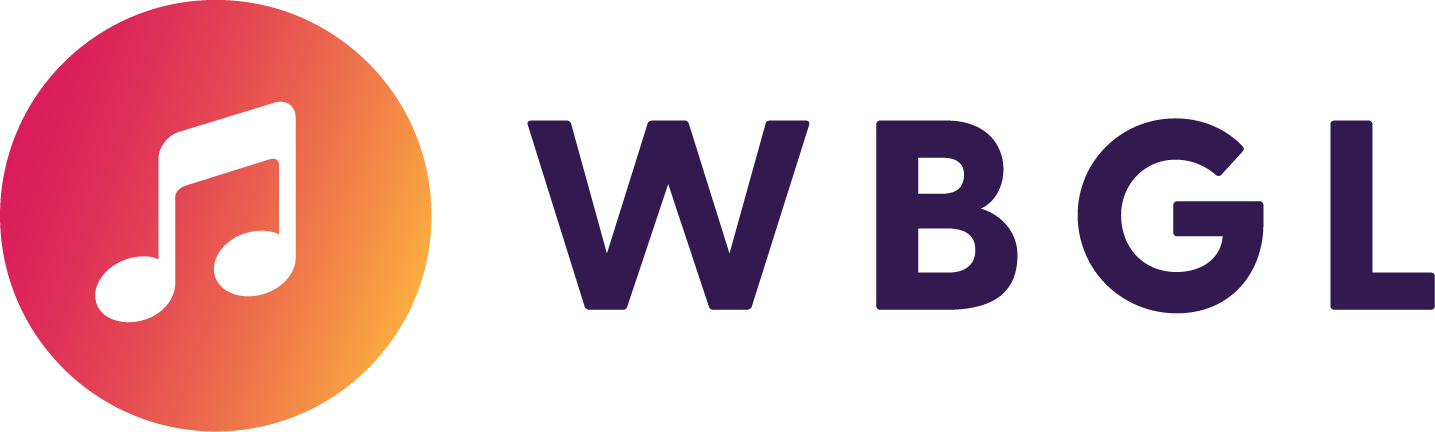
- Morris, Illinois; United States
- Broadcast area: South and West Suburban Chicago; LaSalle, Illinois; Pontiac, Illinois; Kankakee, Illinois
- Frequency: 104.7 MHz

Programming
- Format: Christian AC

Ownership
- Owner: Northwestern Media; (University of Northwestern – St. Paul)
- Sister stations: WBGL; WCIC; WIBI

History
- First air date: May 24, 1962
- Former call signs: WRMI-FM (1962–1977); WCSJ-FM (1977–1988); WUEZ-FM (1988–1990)

Technical information
- Licensing authority: FCC
- Class: B
- ERP: 50,000 watts
- HAAT: 137 meters (449 ft)

Links
- Public license information: Public file; LMS
- Webcast: Listen live
- Website: wbgl.org

WCFL (104.7 MHz) is a non-commercial FM radio station licensed to Morris, Illinois, and serving the Western suburbs of the Chicago metropolitan area. It airs a Christian adult contemporary format and is owned by the University of Northwestern – St. Paul. WCFL simulcasts the programming of WBGL in Champaign, Illinois. It is listener-supported and holds periodic on-the-air fundraisers to pay for station expenses.

WCFL has an effective radiated power (ERP) of 50,000 watts, the maximum for most stations in Illinois. The transmitter is off Stockdale Road in Morris.

== History ==
=== WRMI, WCSJ-FM, WUEZ ===
The station was first licensed May 24, 1962. Its original call sign was WRMI-FM, which stood for Radio Morris Illinois.

WRMI was a stand-alone FM station started by Ottila E. Greiner, an employee of a vending machine manufacturing firm and who also owned a cattle breeding ranch. The studio and transmitter were located at the Rocking Horse Ranch, outside of Morris.

In 1972, the station was sold to Grundy County Broadcasters, owners of crosstown WCSJ (1550 AM), and became a sister station, and were primarily simulcasting.

In the 1970s, WRMI-FM and WCSJ had a middle of the road (MOR) format. In 1977 the station's call sign was changed to WCSJ-FM to match 1550 AM; the two stations continued to simulcast.

By 1983, the stations were airing a country music format. In 1988, 104.7 FM separated its programming from 1550 AM and changed its call letters to WUEZ-FM. As WUEZ-FM, the station aired an easy listening format. The station was automated, playing quarter-hour sweeps of mostly instrumental cover versions of popular adult songs along with some soft vocals.

=== WCFL ===
In 1990, the station changed its call sign to WCFL and adopted an oldies format with the branding "Super CFL". It used slogans and jingles which harkened back to the Top 40 days of WCFL (1000 AM), when it was popular among teens. The original WCFL-FM air staff included Gary Rivers, Bob Zak, Tom Kapsalis, Don Beno, and Jeff Andrews. WCFL played the hits of 1965 to 1979, with the goal of capturing the sound of the original WCFL.

The oldies format lasted until January 1994, when the station began simulcasting the soft AC programming of WCSJ. At that point, its owners were looking to sell WCFL.

=== Christian radio ===
In late 1993, the station was sold to the Illinois District Council of the Assemblies of God. In February 1994, the station went silent while the sale was being finalized. WCFL adopted its present contemporary Christian music format in May 1994. By 2003, the station was simulcasting WBGL full-time.

In a complaint filed with the Federal Communications Commission in 2017, WCFL claimed that its signal has been subjected to co-channel interference from translator W284DA, which relays WRDZ. The translator is operated by Polnet Communications Ltd. of Chicago.

In August 2019, the Illinois Bible Institute reached an agreement to sell the entire WBGL/WCIC New Life Media Network (including WCFL) to the University of Northwestern – St. Paul. The university owns and operates Northwestern Media, a network of Contemporary Christian stations and another network of Christian talk and teaching stations. The sale price was $9,901,558.34. While the station remains Contemporary Christian, the format and programming are overseen by the University of Northwestern - St. Paul, based in Minneapolis.
