= Family Classics =

- The set of Family Classics and host Frazier Thomas.
- Genre: Classic Films
- Created by: Fred Silverman; Frazier Thomas
- Presented by: Frazier Thomas; Roy Leonard; Dean Richards; Steve Sanders
- Theme music composer: Dennis Berry
- Opening theme: "Moviescope"
- Ending theme: "Moviescope"
- Country of origin: United States
- Original language: English
- No. of seasons: 40
- No. of episodes: 1001

Original release
- Network: WGN-TV
- Release: September 14, 1962 – December 25, 2000
- Release: December 8, 2017 – January 5, 2020

Family Classics is a Chicago television series which began in 1962 when Frazier Thomas was added to another program at WGN-TV. Thomas not only hosted classic films, but also selected the titles and personally edited them to remove those scenes which he thought were not fit for family viewing. After Thomas' death in 1985, Roy Leonard took over the program. The series continued sporadically until its initial cancellation in 2000.

On November 10, 2017, WGN announced that Family Classics would be returning after a 17-year hiatus with a presentation of the 1951 version of Scrooge to air on Friday, December 8, 2017, and announced that its longtime entertainment reporter, Dean Richards, would be the new host. Since then, it would continue to air each holiday season.

== History ==
In 1962, Fred Silverman, then a WGN-TV executive, conceived the idea of the show by scheduling classic family films at a prime time Friday night position rather than a late show slot where children wouldn't see them. The show was a huge ratings success and inspired the networks to schedule recently released films in prime time. When the networks began showing first-run films in prime time, the show was rescheduled to Sunday afternoons.

For the series' December 2019 airing of the 1942 film Holiday Inn, and New Year's Eve airings of the Marx Brothers' Monkey Business & Animal Crackers, WGN veteran anchor, Steve Sanders, filled in as host as current host Dean Richards was recovering from a fractured wrist and facial abrasions before the episode's taping.

== The set ==
The theme music was a piece of library music recorded on the Berry/Conroy label, entitled Moviescope, and was written by Dennis Berry. The camera would slowly zoom in on the set designed by Thomas that resembled a study with a painting on the wall of Garfield Goose done by Roy Brown, a model sailing ship sitting on top of a shelf of books with the titles of the films to be shown that were repainted encyclopedias and dictionaries also done by Anthony M Sulla as credited in the final credits, that Frazier would introduce.

== List of titles ==
- The Absent-Minded Professor (1961 film) (Fred MacMurray)
- The Adventures of Frontier Fremont (1976 film) (Dan Haggerty)
- The Adventures of Huckleberry Finn (1939 film) (Mickey Rooney)
- The Adventures of Robinson Crusoe (1954 film) (Dan O'Herlihy)
- The Adventures of Robin Hood (1938 film) (Errol Flynn, Olivia de Havilland, Claude Rains)
- The Adventures of Tom Sawyer (1938 film)
- Air Bud (1997 film)
- Aladdin (1992 animated film) (Scott Weinger, Robin Williams, Gilbert Gottfried)
- Aladdin's Magic Lamp (1966 film)
- Ali Baba and the Forty Thieves (1944 film)
- All Dogs Go to Heaven (1989 animated film) (Burt Reynolds, Dom DeLuise)
- An American Tail (1986 animated film) (Phillip Glasser, Dom DeLuise)
- An Elephant Called Slowly (1969 film)
- Angels in the Outfield (1951 film) (Janet Leigh)
- The Angry Birds Movie (2016 animated film)
- Animal Crackers (1930 film) (Marx Brothers)
- Annie Get Your Gun (1950 film)
- Apache (1954 film) (Burt Lancaster)
- The Apple Dumpling Gang (1975 film) (Bill Bixby, Tim Conway, Don Knotts)
- Arabian Adventure (1979 film) (Christopher Lee)
- Atlantis, the Lost Continent (1961 film)
- Babes in Toyland (1934 film) (Stan Laurel, Oliver Hardy)
- Babes in Toyland (1961 film)
- Baby Huey's Great Easter Adventure (1999 film)
- The Bad News Bears in Breaking Training (1977 film)
- The Bandit of Sherwood Forest (1946 film)
- The Bear (1988 film)
- Belles on Their Toes (1952 film)
- The Bells of St. Mary's (1945 film) (Bing Crosby, Ingrid Bergman)
- Bend of the River (1952 film) (James Stewart, Rock Hudson)
- Benji (1974 film) (Peter Breck)
- Benji the Hunted (1987 film)
- Beau Geste (1939 film) (Gary Cooper, Susan Hayward)
- Big (1988 film) (Tom Hanks)
- The Big Circus (1959 film)
- Bill and Coo (1948 live action film)
- Billy Rose's Jumbo (1962 film)
- The Bishop's Wife (1947 film) (Cary Grant, Loretta Young)
- The Black Rose (1950 film) (Tyrone Power)
- The Black Shield of Falworth (1954 film) (Tony Curtis, Janet Leigh)
- The Black Stallion (1979 film)
- The Black Stallion Returns (1983)
- The Black Swan (1942 film) (Tyrone Power, Maureen O'Hara)
- The Blind Bird (1963 film)
- The Blob (1958) (Steve McQueen)
- Born Free (1966 film)
- A Boy Named Charlie Brown (1969 animated film)
- The Boy and the Pirates (1960 film)
- The Boy Who Caught a Crook (1961 film)
- The Boy with Green Hair (1948 film) (Dean Stockwell, Robert Ryan)
- Boys Town (1938 film) (Spencer Tracy, Mickey Rooney)
- Brigadoon (1954 film) (Gene Kelly)
- Broken Arrow (1950 film) (James Stewart)
- Brigham Young (1940 film) (Tyrone Power)
- Buffalo Bill (1944 film) (Maureen O'Hara, Anthony Quinn)
- Calamity Jane (1953 film) (Doris Day)
- The Canterville Ghost (1944 film) (Charles Laughton, Robert Young, Margaret O'Brien)
- Captain Blood (1935 film) (Errol Flynn, Olivia de Havilland)
- Captain from Castile (1947 film) (Tyrone Power)
- Captain Horatio Hornblower (1951 film) (Gregory Peck)
- Captain January (1936 film) (Shirley Temple)
- Captains Courageous (1937 film) (Spencer Tracy, Freddie Bartholomew, Mickey Rooney)
- The Care Bears Movie (1985 animated film) (Mickey Rooney)
- Chad Hanna (1940 film) (Henry Fonda)
- The Charge of the Light Brigade (1936 film) (Errol Flynn)
- Chitty Chitty Bang Bang (1968 film) (Dick Van Dyke, Sally Ann Howes)
- Christmas in Connecticut (1945 film) (Barbara Stanwyck)
- Challenge to Lassie (1949 film) (Lassie)
- Cheaper by the Dozen (1950 film)
- A Child Called Jesus (1987 film)
- A Christmas Carol (1938 film) (Reginald Owen)
- A Christmas Carol (1984 film) (George C. Scott)
- A Christmas Story (1983 film) (Peter Billingsley, Melinda Dillon)
- Circus World (1964 film) (John Wayne, Rita Hayworth)
- City Beneath the Sea (1971 film) (Robert Wagner, Richard Basehart)
- Come to the Stable (1949 film) (Loretta Young)
- A Connecticut Yankee in King Arthur's Court (1949 film) (Bing Crosby)
- Conrack (1974 film) (Jon Voight)
- The Corsican Brothers (1941 film) (Douglas Fairbanks Jr.)
- The Count of Monte Cristo (1934 film)
- The Count of Monte Cristo (1975 film) (Richard Chamberlain, Tony Curtis)
- Cougar Country (1971 film)
- The Courage of Black Beauty (1958 film)
- Courage of Lassie (1946 film) (Elizabeth Taylor)
- Courage Mountain (1990 film) (Charlie Sheen)
- Crack in the World (1965 film) (Dana Andrews)
- The Crimson Pirate (1952 film) (Burt Lancaster)
- David Copperfield (1935 film) (W. C. Fields, Freddie Bartholomew, Basil Rathbone)
- The Day the Earth Stood Still (1951 film) (Patricia Neal)
- The Daydreamer (1966 live action film)
- The Desert Fox: The Story of Rommel (1951 film) (James Mason)
- The Desert Rats (1953 film) (Richard Burton, James Mason)
- Destination Moon (1950 film)
- A Dispatch from Reuter's (1940 film) (Edward G Robinson)
- Doctor Dolittle (1967 film) (Rex Harrison)
- The Drum (1938 film)
- Drums Along the Mohawk (1939 film) (Henry Fonda, Claudette Colbert)
- Duck Soup (1933 film) (Marx Brothers)
- Dumbo (1941 animated film)
- The Easy Way (1952 film) (Cary Grant)
- Edison, the Man (1940 film) (Spencer Tracy)
- Elephant Boy (1937 film) (Sabu)
- The Enemy Below (1957 film) (Robert Mitchum)
- Everything's Ducky (1961 film) (Buddy Hackett, Mickey Rooney)
- The Fabulous World of Jules Verne (1958 film)
- Fantasia 2000 (1999 animated film)
- Father Goose (1964 film) (Cary Grant)
- Fearless Fagan (1952 film)
- The Flame and the Arrow (1950 film) (Burt Lancaster)
- The Flame and the Sword (1962 film)
- Flipper (1963 film) (Luke Halpin, Chuck Connors)
- Flipper's New Adventure (1964 film) (Luke Halpin)
- For the Love of Benji (1977 film) (Peter Bowles)
- For the Love of Rusty (1947 film)
- Forbidden Planet (1956 film) (Leslie Nielsen)
- Francis of Assisi (1961 film)
- Friendly Persuasion (1956 film) (Gary Cooper)
- Gallant Bess (1946 film)
- The Gallant Hours (1960 film) (James Cagney)
- Gay Purr-ee (1962 animated film) (Judy Garland, Robert Goulet, Red Buttons)
- General Spanky (1936 film)
- Gentle Giant (1967 film) (Dennis Weaver)
- The Ghost and Mrs. Muir (1947 film) (Gene Tierney, Rex Harrison)
- The Glass Slipper (1955 film) (Leslie Caron, Michael Wilding)
- The Golden Age of Comedy (1957 film) (Stan Laurel, Oliver Hardy)
- Great Expectations (1946 film)
- Great Expectations (1974 film)
- The Great Muppet Caper (1981 film) (Jim Henson, Frank Oz, Jerry Nelson, Charles Grodin)
- The Greatest Show on Earth (1952 film) (Cecil B. DeMille)
- Green Grass of Wyoming (1948 film)
- Gulliver's Travels (1939 animated film)
- Hans Brinker (1969 film)
- Hans Christian Andersen (1952 film) (Danny Kaye)
- Harry and the Hendersons (1987 film) (John Lithgow)
- Heidi (1937 film) (Shirley Temple)
- Heidi's Song (1983 animated film) (Lorne Greene, Sammy Davis Jr.)
- Here Come the Tigers (1978 film)
- Hiawatha (1952 film)
- High Noon (1952 film) (Gary Cooper, Grace Kelly, Lloyd Bridges)
- Hills of Home (1948 film) (Edmund Gwenn, Janet Leigh)
- Holiday Inn (1942 film) (Bing Crosby, Fred Astaire)
- Home for the Holidays (1995 film) (Holly Hunter)
- Homeward Bound: The Incredible Journey (1993 film) (Sally Field, Michael J Fox, Don Ameche)
- Homeward Bound II: Lost in San Francisco (1996 film)
- Honey, I Blew Up the Kid (1992 film) (Rick Moranis)
- Honey, I Shrunk the Kids (1989 film) (Rick Moranis)
- Hoppity Goes To Town (1941 animated film)
- Horse Feathers (1932 film) (Marx Brothers)
- The Horse Soldiers (1959 film) (John Wayne)
- Houdini (1953 film) (Tony Curtis, Janet Leigh)
- How the Grinch Stole Christmas (2000 film) (Jim Carrey)
- How the Toys Saved Christmas (1996 film)
- The Human Comedy (1943 film) (Mickey Rooney)
- The Incredible Mr. Limpet (1964 live-action animated film) (Don Knotts)
- Ice Age (2002 animated film)
- Inside Out (2015 animated film)
- Island of the Blue Dolphins (1964 film)
- Iron Will (1994 film)
- It's a Dog's Life (1955 film)
- It's a Mad, Mad, Mad, Mad World (1963 Film) (Spencer Tracy)
- It's a Wonderful Life (1946 film)
- It Happens Every Spring (1949 film)
- It Nearly Wasn't Christmas (1989 film)
- Jack Frost (1964 film) (English dubbed Soviet film Morozko)
- John Paul Jones (1959 film) (Robert Stack)
- Journey Back to Oz (1974 animated film)
- Journey to the Center of the Earth (1959 film)
- Jungle Book (1942 film)
- The Jungle Book (1967 animated film)
- The Kentuckian (1955 film) (Burt Lancaster)
- Kidnapped (1938 film)
- King of the Khyber Rifles (1953 film) (Tyrone Power)
- King of the Wild Stallions (1959 film)
- King Richard and the Crusaders (1954 film) (Rex Harrison, Virginia Mayo)
- Kingdom of the Clouds (1968 film)
- Kit Carson (1940 film)
- Knute Rockne, All American (1940 film) (Pat O'Brien, Ronald Reagan)
- Lad, A Dog (1962 film)
- Lassie Come Home (1943 film) (Roddy McDowall, Elizabeth Taylor, Donald Crisp, Edmund Gwenn, Nigel Bruce)
- Lassie's Great Adventure (1963 film)
- The Last of the Mohicans (1936 film)
- The Last of the Mohicans (Steve Forrest) (1977 TV film)
- Life with Father (1947 film)
- Lili (1953 film) (Leslie Caron, Mel Ferrer)
- Lilies of the Field (Sidney Poitier)
- The Lion and the Horse (1952 film)
- The Little Colonel (1935 film) (Shirley Temple)
- Little Lord Fauntleroy (1980 film) (Rick Schroder)
- A Little Princess (1973 TV film)
- The Little Princess (1939 film) (Shirley Temple)
- Little Women (1933 film)
- Little Women (1949 film)
- The Littlest Hobo (1958 film)
- The Lives of a Bengal Lancer (1935 film) (Gary Cooper)
- Living Free (1972 film)
- The Lone Ranger (1956 film) (Clayton Moore)
- The Lone Ranger and the Lost City of Gold (1958 film) (Clayton Moore)
- Long John Silver (1954 film)
- Lost Angel (1943 film)
- The Lost World (1960 film) (Jill St. John, Claude Rains)
- The Macahans (1976 film)
- Made in Heaven (1987 film) (Timothy Hutton, Kelly McGillis)
- The Magic of Lassie (1978 film) (James Stewart, Lassie, Mickey Rooney)
- The Magic Sword (1962 film) (Basil Rathbone)
- The Man in the Iron Mask (1939 film)
- The Man in the Iron Mask (1977 film) (Richard Chamberlain)
- The Mark of Zorro (1940 film) (Tyrone Power)
- The Mark of Zorro (1974 film)
- The Master of Ballantrae (1953 film) (Errol Flynn)
- Matilda (1978 film) (Elliott Gould, Robert Mitchum)
- Maya (1966 film) (Clint Walker)
- The McConnell Story (1955 film)
- Meet Me in St. Louis (1944 film) (Judy Garland, Margaret O'Brien)
- Merry Andrew (1958 film) (Danny Kaye)
- Mickey's Christmas Carol (1983 animated film)
- The Mighty Ducks (1992 film) (Emilio Estevez)
- Mighty Morphin Power Rangers: The Movie (1995 film)
- A Minor Miracle (1983 film) (Pele)
- The Miracle of Our Lady of Fatima (1952 film)
- Miracle on 34th Street (1947 film) (Maureen O'Hara, Edmund Gwenn, Natalie Wood, John Payne)
- Mission of the Seahawk (1962 film)
- Mister 880 (1950 film) (Burt Lancaster)
- Mister Scoutmaster (1953 film)
- Moby Dick (1956 film) (Gregory Peck)
- Monkey Business (1931 film) (Marx Brothers)
- Mother Goose Rock 'n' Rhyme (1990 film)
- Mountain Man (1976 film)
- Mr. Hobbs Takes a Vacation (1962 film) (James Stewart, Maureen O'Hara)
- The Muppet Movie (1979 live action film) (Jim Henson)
- The Music Man (1962 film) (Robert Preston, Shirley Jones, Buddy Hackett)
- The Mudlark (1950 film)
- Mutiny on the Bounty (1935 film) (Charles Laughton, Clark Gable)
- My Brother Talks to Horses (1947 film)
- My Fair Lady (1964 film) (Audrey Hepburn, Rex Harrison)
- My Friend Flicka (1943 film) (Roddy McDowall)
- My Side of the Mountain (1969 film)
- Mysterious Island (1961 film)
- Namu, My Best Friend (1966 film)
- National Velvet (1944 film)
- Northwest Mounted Police (1940 film) (Gary Cooper)
- Northwest Passage (1940 film) (Spencer Tracy, Robert Young)
- Oh Heavenly Dog (1980 film) (Chevy Chase, Benji)
- Oklahoma (1955 film) (Shirley Jones, Gordon MacRae)
- One Magic Christmas (1985 film) (Mary Steenburgen)
- Operation Petticoat (1959 film) (Cary Grant, Tony Curtis)
- The Palomino (1950 film)
- Penrod and Sam (1931 film)
- Penrod's Double Trouble (1938 film)
- Pete's Dragon (1977 live action animated film) (Mickey Rooney, Red Buttons, Shelley Winters)
- The Pied Piper (1942 film) (Roddy McDowall)
- The Plainsman (1936 film) (Gary Cooper, Jean Arthur)
- Pony Soldier (1951 film) (Tyrone Power)
- Prancer (1989 film) (Sam Elliott, Cloris Leachman)
- The President's Lady (1953 film) (Charlton Heston, Susan Hayward)
- The Pride and the Passion (1957 film) (Cary Grant, Frank Sinatra, Sophia Loren)
- Pride of the Blue Grass (1939 film)
- The Pride of the Yankees (1942 film) (Gary Cooper)
- The Prince and the Pauper (1937 film) (Errol Flynn, Claude Rains)
- Prince Valiant (1954 film) (Robert Wagner, Janet Leigh)
- The Princess and the Pirate (1944 film) (Bob Hope, Virginia Mayo)
- The Private War of Major Benson (1955 film)
- The Proud Rebel (1958 film) (Alan Ladd, Olivia de Havilland)
- The Prisoner of Zenda (1937 film) (Ronald Colman, David Niven, Douglas Fairbanks Jr.)
- PT 109 (1963 film) (Cliff Robertson)
- Raymie (1960 film) (David Ladd)
- Rebecca of Sunnybrook Farm (1938 film)
- Red Skies of Montana (1952 film)
- Return to Oz (1985 film)
- Ring of Bright Water (1969 film)
- Rio Grande (1950 film) (John Wayne, Maureen O'Hara)
- Rip Van Winkle (1962 film)
- Robin Hood (1973 animated film)
- Robin Hood:Prince of Thieves (1991 film) (Kevin Costner)
- Rudolph the Red-Nosed Reindeer: The Movie (1998 animated film)
- Rusty (Rusty Saves a Life) (1949 film)
- Safe at Home! (1962 film)
- Sammy Going South (a.k.a. A Boy Ten Feet Tall) (1963 film) (Edward G Robinson)
- Santa Claus The Movie (1985 film) (Dudley Moore, John Lithgow)
- Saskatchewan (1954 film) (Alan Ladd), Shelley Winters)
- The Scarlet Pimpernel (1934)
- Scott of the Antarctic (1948 film)
- Scrooge (1951 film) (Alastair Sim)
- Scrooge (1970 film)
- The Sea Hawk (1940 film) (Errol Flynn, Claude Rains)
- The Secret Garden (1949 film) (Margaret O'Brien, Dean Stockwell, Herbert Marshall)
- The Secret of Monte Cristo (1961 film)
- The Secret of NIMH (1982 animated film)
- Seminole (1953 film) (Rock Hudson, Anthony Quinn)
- Sergeant York (1941 film) (Gary Cooper)
- Seven Cities of Gold (1955 film) (Anthony Quinn)
- Seven Seas to Calais (1962 film)
- The Sheepman (1958 film) (Glenn Ford, Shirley MacLaine, Leslie Nielsen)
- Shenandoah (1965 film) (James Stewart)
- The Singing Nun (1966 film)
- Sink the Bismarck (1960 film) (Kenneth More)
- Sitting Pretty (1948 film) (Clifton Webb, Robert Young, Maureen O'Hara)
- Sleeping Beauty (1965 film)
- Terms of Endearment (1983 film)
- The Slipper and the Rose (1976 film)
- The Small Miracle (1974 TV film)
- Smoky (1966 live action film) (Fess Parker)
- Snoopy Come Home (1972 animated film)
- Snowfire (1958 film)
- Son of Lassie (1945 film) (Peter Lawford)
- The Son of Monte Cristo (1940 film)
- The Song of Bernadette (1943 film) (Vincent Price)
- The Spanish Main (1945 film) (Maureen O'Hara)
- Stanley and Livingstone (1939 film) (Spencer Tracy)
- Stars and Stripes Forever (1952 film) (Clifton Webb, Robert Wagner)
- The Story of Alexander Graham Bell (1939 film)
- The Story of Louis Pasteur (1936 film)
- The Story of Seabiscuit (1949 film) (Shirley Temple)
- Stowaway to the Moon (1975 film) (Lloyd Bridges)
- The Sun Comes Up (1949 film)
- Susannah of the Mounties (1939 film) (Shirley Temple)
- Swiss Family Robinson (1960 film) (John Mills)
- The Sword in the Stone (film) (1963 animated film)
- A Tale of Two Cities (1980 TV film) (Peter Cushing)
- The Rescuers (1977 animated film) (Bob Newhart, Eva Gabor)
- The Rescuers Down Under (1990 film) (Bob Newhart, Eva Gabor, George G. Scott, John Candy)
- The Red Pony (1949 film) (Robert Mitchum, Myrna Loy)
- The Remarkable Mr. Pennypacker (1959 film)
- The Return of Monte Cristo (1946 film)
- The Rocketeer (1991 film)
- The Tender Years (1948 film)
- The Thief of Bagdad (1940 film)
- The Three Musketeers (1948) (Gene Kelly, Vincent Price, Lana Turner)
- The Time Machine (1960 film) (Directed George Pal) (Starring Rod Taylor)
- The Time Machine (1978 film)
- The Unfinished Dance (1947 film)
- The Wacky World of Mother Goose (1967 animated film)
- The War of the Worlds (1953 film)
- The Wild and the Free (1980 film)
- The Yearling (1946 film) (Gregory Peck, Jane Wyman, Claude Jarman Jr.)
- They Died with Their Boots On (1941 film) (Errol Flynn, Olivia de Havilland)
- Thoroughbreds Don't Cry (1937 film) (Mickey Rooney, Judy Garland)
- Those Magnificent Men in Their Flying Machines (1965 film)
- Thundercloud (1950 film) (Lloyd Bridges)
- Thunderhead, Son of Flicka (1945 film) (Roddy McDowall)
- A Time for Every Season (1972 film)
- Tobor the Great (1954 film)
- To Find a Rainbow (1971 film)
- Treasure Galleons (1973 film)
- Treasure Island (Wallace Beery, Jackie Cooper)
- Treasure Island (1990 film) (Charlton Heston, Christopher Lee)
- Treasure of the Golden Condor (1955 film)
- Two Years Before the Mast (1946 film)
- Uncle Sam Magoo (1970 TV film)
- Union Pacific (1939 film) (Barbara Stanwyck)
- Voyage to the Bottom of the Sea (1961 film) (Barbara Eden, Robert Sterling)
- Wee Willie Winkie (1937 film) (Shirley Temple, Cesar Romero)
- Wells Fargo (1937 film)
- Western Union (1941 film) (Robert Young)
- When the North Wind Blows (1974 film)
- When Worlds Collide (1951 film)
- Who Framed Roger Rabbit (1988 live action/animated film)
- Wilderness Journey (1970 film)
- White Christmas (1954 film) (Bing Crosby, Danny Kaye)
- White Fang (1991 film) (Ethan Hawke)
- White Fang 2: Myth of the White Wolf (1994 film) (Ethan Hawke)
- White Feather (1955 film) (Robert Wagner)
- Willy McBean and his Magic Machine (1965 animated film)
- Yankee Doodle Dandy (1942 film) (James Cagney)
- Yellow Jack (1938 film)
- Young Mr. Lincoln (1939 film) (Henry Fonda)
- Young People (1940 film) (Shirley Temple)
- Young Tom Edison (1940) (Mickey Rooney)

== Bibliography ==
- Okuda, Ted; Mulqueen, Jack (2004). The Golden Age of Chicago Children's Television. Lake Claremont Press. ISBN 978-1-893-12117-1.
