= Eddie Hubbard =

American radio personality

ABC Radio Stardust Publicity Photo

Charles Edward Hubbard (August 29, 1917 – March 26, 2007) was an American easy-listening/MOR disc jockey and radio personality in Chicago, at such radio stations as WIND and WGN. At WGN he co-hosted a popular show with Jack Brickhouse.

== Early years ==
Born in Baltimore, Maryland, Hubbard attended the University of Baltimore, following his father's advice to prepare for a secure profession. While there, he found participating in shows to be more appealing. During his sophomore year in college, he began working at radio station WITH as a disk jockey. During his years in Baltimore, he also worked at WCAO and entertained in theaters, night clubs and on a vaudeville circuit.

== Career in Chicago ==
Hubbard moved to Chicago in the mid-1940s. He worked at WIND-AM and hosted stage shows at the big Loop theaters. He also played the ukulele, performing at lounges around Chicago on weekends. In 1956, he joined WGN as a personality. In addition to his regular duties, that included hosting the morning drive time show until 1965, he appeared on the Saturday night "Barn Dance" show. He wrote some of TV scripts for Hawaiian Eye and Love, American Style.

Some sources give Hubbard partial credit for the success of Jerry Murad's Harmonicats' recording of Peg o' My Heart in 1947. An article in the Chicago Sunday Tribune noted, "His way of plugging the tune was the subject of articles in national magazines."

In the early 1980s, Hubbard was host of a daily talk program on WVVX-FM. Hubbard joined WJJD in March 1982, when the station adopted an adult standards format. In 1983, he left WJJD and joined WAIT.

=== Television ===
Hubbard supplemented his work in radio by venturing into television. In the late 1940s, he was master of ceremonies for Dollars and Sense on Monday nights and Vaudeo Varieties on Friday nights. Both were on Chicago's WENR-TV, which became WLS-TV. In 1956, he was selected to be host of Dance Party on WBKB-TV in Chicago.

=== Disc jockey organization ===
In 1947, Hubbard was elected the first president of the Chicago Disc Jockeys Association.

== Dallas ==
In 1990, he moved from Chicago to Dallas, the new home of the Satellite Music Network, known later as ABC Radio Networks, where he was the afternoon host on the Stardust format and was heard on hundreds of stations. While with ABC, Hubbard teamed with Dallas radio legend Bud Buschardt. Prior to his move to Dallas, Hubbard broadcast at WJJD, again playing popular recordings of the 1940s/1950s.

== Jackie Smith ==
Hubbard was married to Jackie Smith (née Alice Jacqueline Hartman) (died 1987), first publicity director of Mercury Records. Smith was the mother of Conrad Robert Falk, who would later, as an actor, adopt the stage name Robert Conrad. Hubbard thus was Conrad's stepfather for approximately a decade until he and Smith divorced around 1958.

== Death ==
Hubbard died, aged 89, on March 26, 2007 in a Fort Worth, Texas hospital from injuries sustained in an automobile accident in Grand Prairie, Texas.
