= WMST =

Coordinates: 38°02′41″N 83°54′05″W

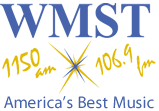
- Mount Sterling, Kentucky; United States
- Broadcast area: Lexington-Fayette
- Frequency: 1150 kHz
- Branding: 1150 am & 106.9 fm WMST

Programming
- Format: Adult standards and soft AC
- Affiliations: NBC News Radio; America's Best Music (Westwood One)

Ownership
- Owner: Gateway Radio Works, Inc.
- Sister stations: WKYN, WWKY, WKCA, WIVY

History
- First air date: October 17, 1957
- Call sign meaning: Mount Sterling

Technical information
- Licensing authority: FCC
- Class: D
- Power: 2,500 watts (day); 53 watts (night)
- Translator: 106.9 W295BD (Mount Sterling)

Links
- Public license information: Public file; LMS
- Webcast: Listen live
- Website: wmstradio.com

WMST (1150 AM) is a commercial radio station licensed to Mount Sterling, Kentucky, United States, and serving the Lexington-Fayette metropolitan area. It is owned by Gateway Radio Works and airs a soft oldies and adult standards format.

Programming is also heard on 250-watt FM translator W295BD at 106.9 MHz.

== History ==
WMST signed on the air on October 22, 1957, as a 500-watt daytimer station, required to go off the air at night. It was owned by the Mount Sterling Broadcasting Company.

WMST was the originating station of the nationwide syndicated show, The Sunday Morning Wake-up with Chris from August 2003 until December 2008 and was produced in the studios of WMST.

Local air talent Chris Conkright won the "Edward R. Murrow Award" in 2009 for "Best Newscast" in Small Market Radio for his entry, "Gateway Regional News at Five."

== Programming ==
Programming includes newscasts from NBC News Radio and the Kentucky News Network, along with five local newscasts ("Gateway Regional News") every weekday. Live talk shows and Christian talk and teaching programs are also heard. The weekday line-up begins with a locally produced show, "Mornings on Main" with music, news and talk. Nights and weekends feature Westwood One's "America's Best Music".

== Translators ==
In addition to the main station, WMST is relayed by an FM translator to widen its broadcast area.

Call sign	Frequency	City of license	FID	ERP (W)	Class	FCC info
W295BD	106.9 FM	Mount Sterling, Kentucky	153992	250	D	LMS
