= WWKY =

WWKY may refer to:

- WWKY (AM), a radio station (980 AM) licensed to serve London, Kentucky, United States
- WWKY-FM, a radio station (104.9 FM) licensed to serve Providence, Kentucky
- WREF (FM), a radio station (97.7 FM) licensed to serve Sebree, Kentucky, which held the call sign WWKY from 2004 to 2017
