= WGWM =

WGWM may refer to:

- WGWM (FM), a radio station (91.5 FM) licensed to serve Trevett, Maine, United States; see List of radio stations in Maine
- WWKY (AM), a radio station (990 AM) licensed to serve Winchester, Kentucky, United States, which held the call sign WGWM from 1996 to 2017
