= Hits & Favorites =

Adult Contemporary
- Type: Radio network
- Country: United States
- Availability: National; also distributed in Canada, Europe, Armed Forces Radio
- Owner: Westwood One
- Key people: Peter Stewart, Tom Kennedy, Carl Anderson
- Launch date: 1981
- Former names: Starstation
- Official website: Westwood One information page

Adult Contemporary, billed on-air with the slogan Today's Hits and Yesterday's Favorites (or Hits & Favorites for short), is a 24-hour music format produced by Cumulus Media Networks (now Westwood One).

== History ==
Starstation, as it was formerly known, was part of the original Satellite Music Network, with studios in Mokena, Illinois, outside of Chicago. After being acquired by ABC/Capital Cities, the format moved to studios in Dallas, Texas, along with many of the other SMN formats and was internally billed as ABC AC but using the on-air branding of "Today's Hits and Yesterday's Favorites." ABC AC combined a highly researched Adult Contemporary music mix targeted to women aged 25–49.

Citadel Broadcasting purchased ABC Radio Networks (now Cumulus Media Networks) and the ABC owned-and-operated radio stations from The Walt Disney Company in February 2006. The Citadel acquisition has been completed and did not include Radio Disney or the ESPN Stations. Citadel merged with Cumulus Media on September 16, 2011.

As of 2025, Westwood One continues to offer the Adult Contemporary format using the "Today's Hits and Yesterday's Favorites" slogan.

== Weekday hosts ==
- Frank Welch (also hosted Saturday 80's Show)
- Richard Stevens
- Mike Wade
- Mary Rose
- Donny Osmond (midday)

== Weekend hosts ==
- Milli Mills
- Steve Eberhart
- Sheryl Shannon
- Scott Reese
- Debbie Douglass
- Areka Spencer

== Former hosts ==
- Citadel Media Networks had a mass firing on November 12, 2009. Those let go from the AC format include: Peter Stewart – the 20-year program director of the format, Tom Kennedy – assistant program director, Brian Kane – night time host and webmaster, and Lori St. James – longtime morning show co-host. St. James's co-host Richard Stevens now hosts a solo show on the format.
- John McCarty hosted the Saturday 70's (later changed to 80's) Show for about a decade on the format. He died suddenly at the age of 55 on May 26, 2008, due to complications with diabetes. John was concurrently employed as the local operations manager for Traffic.com in Dallas, and had worked in local Dallas-Fort Worth radio since 1979. McCarty began his radio career in his hometown of Hopkinsville, KY in 1968.
- Bob Leonard was the original morning man on the format, and spent nearly 25 years with the ABC Radio Networks. Leonard did many of the smooth-voiced promos for The Star Station as well. Next, Leonard became a host on the short-lived financial online talk radio site mn1.com, then afternoon news anchor at WBAP-AM in Fort Worth-Dallas before relocating to Miami, Florida, where he worked as a traffic reporter. He has since retired for health reasons.

The format officially ceased broadcasting in mid-July 2014, after a final merger with Westwood One. No personalities were retained from this format. Affiliates now carry Westwood One's AC Total format.

Other former hosts have included:

- Tom Rodman
- Ron Britain
- John Calhoun
- Steve Eberhart
- John Lacy
- Karen Williams
- Rocky Martini
- Robert G. Hall
- Dean Richards
- Tim Spencer
- "VLJ"

== Trivia ==
Richard Stevens is a former Hollywood Squares announcer and is the brother of another Squares announcer and American Top 40 host, Shadoe Stevens.

== Sample hour of programming ==
- "Dancing In The Dark" – Bruce Springsteen
- "Home" – Michael Bublé
- "This I Promise You" – 'N Sync
- "Dream Weaver" – Gary Wright
- "Kokomo" – The Beach Boys
- "This Love" – Maroon 5
- "The Long and Winding Road" – The Beatles
- "Because Of You" – Kelly Clarkson
- "Without You" – Harry Nilsson
- "Bad Day" – Daniel Powter
- "Dreams" – Fleetwood Mac
- "Takes a Little Time" – Amy Grant
- "We've Only Just Begun" – The Carpenters
- "Live Like You Were Dying" – Tim McGraw
- "Another Day in Paradise" – Phil Collins

== See also ==
Satellite Music Network
