= Timeless (radio network) =

Syndicated radio format

- Country: United States

Ownership
- Owner: Citadel Media (through Citadel Broadcasting)

History
- Launch date: 1981
- Closed: February 15, 2010
- Former names: Stardust, Unforgettable Favorites, Timeless Classics, Timeless Favorites

Links
- Website: timelessfavorites.com

Timeless was a 24-hour satellite music service of Citadel Media (through Citadel Broadcasting). It has distributed a mix of soft oldies and adult standards to radio stations around the United States. It was a combination of two former formats: gold-based adult contemporary Unforgettable Favorites (also known as "Memories") and adult standards Timeless Classics/Timeless Favorites (originally known as "Stardust"). Since 2007, it was simply known as "Timeless", still using the "Timeless Favorites" branding sparingly.

The lineup of DJs included Steve Gunn (DJ), Laurie Bandemir, Scott Reese, Debbie Douglas, Vic Thomas, and Mike Matthews on weekdays, and Steve Cumming, Frank Welch, Angie Michaels and Bob Lawrence on weekends, as well as Jack Grady.

Classic artists that were heard on Timeless include The Carpenters, Frank Sinatra, The Beatles, Barry Manilow, James Taylor, Neil Diamond, Anne Murray, Billy Joel, The Beach Boys, Linda Ronstadt, Tony Bennett, Louis Armstrong, Dionne Warwick, Elvis Presley, Carly Simon, The Bee Gees, Glen Campbell, Paul Simon and a dozen more.

== History ==
Satellite Music Network (later taken over by ABC) started the Stardust format in 1981 in the Chicago area, and Eddie Hubbard was one of its first DJs. Past personalities include Jack Davis, Joe Lacina, Jerry Mitchell, Ted Ostrem, Dave Rafferty, Patty Pratt, Larry Carolla, Ron Baxley and Bud Buschardt. The name "Stardust" was taken from a 1927 song called "Stardust" composed by Hoagy Carmichael and performed by Mitchell Parish. For most of its history Stardust was an adult standards format, focusing on the big band era in its early years and evolving over the years to include more oldies and adult contemporary music. The format was called "Unforgettable Favorites" on the air for a while until ABC's Memories, another satellite format from the same company, began using the term. Stardust became "Timeless Classics" and continued to use the term until early in 2007. Among the artists who have recorded standards in recent years that were included in the format: Paul Anka, Michael Bublé, Ray Charles, Manilow, Bette Midler, Ronnie Milsap, Ronstadt, Carly Simon, John Stevens, Rod Stewart, B. J. Thomas, Jamie Cullum, Debby Boone, and Steve Tyrell.

In Summer 2006, Stardust changed to a new sound with the end of Memories, adding a number of that format's songs. The "Unforgettable Favorites" feed was still active as The Christmas Channel on a seasonal basis until 2014.

== Closedown ==
On November 12, 2009, the staff at parent company Citadel Media says that "Timeless" was losing affiliates and became less attractive to advertisers. Citadel Media President John Rosso said it would be discontinued as of February 13, 2010.

This satellite format signed off 2 days after its scheduled date of February 13. The network signed off at 12AM Central Time on February 15, 2010. The last song played on the network was "Kind of a Drag" by The Buckinghams

Former affiliates (listed below) had the option to switch to similar services by Citadel Media, or stay on the current Oldies/Standards format provided locally or by other radio networks, or change their radio formats altogether.

== Sample Hour of Programming (Stardust era, date unknown) ==
- "I've Got You Under My Skin" – Frank Sinatra
- "Georgia on My Mind" – Ray Charles
- "You Light Up My Life" – Debby Boone
- "The Girl From Ipanema" – Stan Getz featuring João and Astrud Gilberto
- "Chances Are" – Johnny Mathis
- "Hello It's Me" – Todd Rundgren
- "Unforgettable" – Nat King Cole & Natalie Cole
- "Copacabana" – Barry Manilow
- "Cherish" – The Association
- "(They Long to Be) Close to You" – The Carpenters
- "How Can I Be Sure?" – The Rascals
- "Mack the Knife" – Bobby Darin
- "Moon River" – Andy Williams
- "To Love Somebody" – The Bee Gees
- "Can't Help Falling in Love" – Elvis Presley
- "She's Always a Woman" – Billy Joel
- "Summer Rain" – Johnny Rivers

== Sample Hour of Programming (Timeless era) ==
- "Please Baby Don't" – Sérgio Mendes with John Legend
- "Only the Lonely" – Roy Orbison
- "We've Only Just Begun" – The Carpenters
- "I Hear a Symphony" – The Supremes
- "Hello It's Me" – Todd Rundgren
- "Suspicious Minds" – Elvis Presley
- "Bridge over Troubled Water" – Simon & Garfunkel
- "For Once in My Life" – Stevie Wonder
- "Behind Closed Doors" – Charlie Rich
- "Do You Know the Way to San Jose" – Dionne Warwick
- "Theme from 'Love Story'" – Henry Mancini
- "Rocky Mountain High" – John Denver
- "Sugar, Sugar" – The Archies

== Former Affiliates (prior to shut down) ==
- Ashland, Ohio – WNCO
- Batavia, New York – WBTA
- Beaverton, Michigan – WMRX-FM
- Burlington, Vermont – WJOY
- Cape Vincent, New York (Kingston, Ontario, Canada) – WLYK
- Cedar Rapids, Iowa – KMRY
- Crescent City, California – KPOD
- Dunedin, Florida – WHBO (new affiliate)
- Ellsworth, Maine – WDEA
- Fairfield Bay, Arkansas – KFFB
- Flint, Michigan – WFNT
- Gloucester, Virginia – WXGM
- Grafton, West Virginia – WVUS
- Hesperia, California – KRAK
- Henderson, Kentucky - WSON
- Hendersonville, North Carolina – WTZQ
- Jackson, Mississippi – WLEZ-LP
- Lakeland, Florida – WONN
- Lansing, Michigan – WXLA
- Mayfield, Kentucky – WYMC
- Midland, Michigan – WMPX
- Minden, Louisiana – KASO
- Monroeville, Alabama – WMFC
- Morehead, Kentucky – WIVY
- Morris, Illinois - WCSJ/WCSJ-FM
- Mount Sterling, Kentucky – WMST
- Mount Vernon, Ohio – WMVO
- Oakland, Maryland – WMSG
- Oneonta, Alabama – WCRL
- Owensboro, Kentucky – WVJS
- Penn Yan, New York – WYLF
- Quincy, Massachusetts - WJDA
- Radford, Virginia – WRAD (new affiliate)
- Red Bluff, California – KBLF
- Robbins, North Carolina – WLHC
- Sandusky, Ohio – WLEC
- Sister Bay, Wisconsin – WSBW
- Somerset, Kentucky – WTLO
- Sulphur Springs, Texas – KSST
- Sycamore, Illinois - WSQR
- Troy, Alabama – WTBF-FM (nighttime hours only)
- Van Wert, Ohio – WERT
- Washington, Indiana – WAMW
- Waterloo, Iowa – KWLO
- Waupun, Wisconsin - WFDL
- Wildwood, New Jersey – WCMC
- Wolfeboro, New Hampshire – WASR
- Owensboro, Kentucky - WVJS (AM)
- Cannelton, Indiana - WTCJ

== Competitor Networks ==
- Music of Your Life by Planet Halo, Inc.
- America's Best Music by Westwood One/Dial Global
- The Lounge by Waitt Radio Networks
