= WMAK (disambiguation) =

WMAK is a radio station (1570 AM) licensed to Lobelville, Tennessee, United States.

WMAK may also refer to:

- WBEN (AM), a radio station (930 AM) licensed to Buffalo, New York, which held the call sign WMAK from 1922 to 1930
- WUFO, a radio station (1080 AM) licensed to Amherst, New York, which held the call sign WMAK from 1930 to 1932
- WNQM, a radio station (1300 AM) licensed to Nashville, Tennessee, which held the call sign WMAK from 1948 to 1982
- WWKY (AM), a radio station (990 AM) licensed to Winchester, Kentucky, which held the call sign WMAK from 1986 to 1996
- WCJK, a radio station (96.3 FM) licensed to Murfreesboro, Tennessee, which held the call sign WMAK from 2000 to 2005
- WKNX-TV, a television station (channel 7) licensed to Knoxville, Tennessee, which held the call sign WMAK-TV from 2004 to 2013
