= WDYS =

WDYS may refer to:

- WDYS (AM), a radio station (1480 AM) licensed to serve Somonauk, Illinois, United States
- WGMF-FM, a radio station (103.9 FM) licensed to serve Dushore, Pennsylvania, United States, which held the call sign WDYS from 2016 to 2018
