= WGGI =

WGGI may refer to:

- WGGI (AM), a radio station (990 AM) licensed to serve Somerset, Pennsylvania, United States
- WKBP, a radio station (95.9 FM) licensed to serve Benton, Pennsylvania, which held the call sign WGGI from 1998 to 2017
- WKYN, a radio station (107.7 FM) licensed to serve Mount Sterling, Kentucky, United States, which held the call sign WGGI in 1983
