= Satellite Music Network =

American radio syndication company

- Type: Radio network
- Country: United States

Ownership
- Key people: John Tyler, Bob Leonard, Robert Hall & Gary Semro

History
- Launch date: 1981
- Closed: 1989
- Replaced by: ABC Radio

Coverage
- Availability: National, through regional affiliates

Satellite Music Network was the first satellite delivered network to provide complete live 24-hour-a-day music programming to local stations, under several different formats.

== History ==
Affiliate stations, mostly in small and medium markets, could operate their stations virtually unmanned with nothing more than its existing tape-based playback equipment, a computer and a satellite hookup offering high quality air talent that they could never afford.

The concept was the presentation of live, carefully selected and rotated hit music, presented by experienced major market industry veterans over a satellite channel in real time.

Though nationally distributed, the presentation was localized by the network's talent pushing a button sending a subaudible tone over the network that would trigger a tape machine at the receiving station. For example, a button would be pressed triggering a local station's call sign and frequency (referred to as "magicalls") at the receiving station that was pre-recorded by the talent. The talent would then wait anywhere from 3 to 5 seconds before beginning to speak. Another button pressed at the end of a talk break by the talent would trigger a cluster of local commercials at the receiving station, or a closure tone at the receiving station would send control back to the network if there were no commercials. The network provided music and DJs, localized talent-matching liners, limited promotions support consisting of ideas used by other affiliates, and years later, a website. As the network moved from analog to digital satellite, it also provided receivers to affiliates to use on a loaned basis.

A "clock" was provided to affiliates outlining the placement of news and commercial cut-aways, and differed throughout the day and weekends. The clock included options for a 2-, 3-, or 5-minute newscasts at the top of the hour, followed by other holes for local spots. While the programming was live, DJs had to avoid references to the weather or anything else that would not be appropriate in many time zones. An 800-line was eventually added, allowing the live DJs to take phoned in requests.

SMN began in 1981 in Mokena, Illinois in a strip mall with two formats: AC (adult contemporary) – signed on by Bob Leonard (not the basketball player of the same name), and country music – signed on by Gary Semro. In less than three years, the network had signed more than 300 affiliates. By the late 1980s, SMN was broadcasting to more than 600 stations nationwide and in the Caribbean. In late 1989, SMN merged into ABC Radio and moved operations to Dallas, and expanded the number of available formats to ten. ABC sold the former SMN suite to Citadel Broadcasting in 2007, who in turn sold it to Cumulus Media in 2011; Cumulus then merged its suite with competitors.

In 2019, ABC Radio re-entered the 24/7 music format with a partnership with Local Radio Networks.

Bonneville Broadcasting also signed on with an easy listening format simultaneously to SMN – signed on by Tim Kolody from the same studios in August 1981. Bonneville pulled out of SMN in June 1984.

Among the talent that was employed at SMN was Chicago radio legend Eddie Hubbard and Joe Lacina on the Stardust format, Dean Richards who can be heard on WGN and WGN-TV in Chicago; Karen Williams of WNUA; Dennis Jon Bailey, now morning show host and Marconi Award winner at WIKY Radio in Evansville; News was done by Larry Langford also of WIND at the time and later WMAQ in Chicago; and John Calhoun, who continues to broadcast in the Chicago metropolitan area. A top 40 network called "The Heat" also existed, but little historical information is available for this network. "The Heat" was originally called "ALL Hit Radio", air staff included: Monty Foster (MoFo), Vic Saint John, Jason Taylor, Pat Clarke, Jack Murray. The networks were later moved to Dallas, Texas, where talent on Country Coast to Coast included: Jim Beedle, Jim Casey, Ted Clark, Steve Sharp, Jerry Walker, R.J. Steele, Mark Edwards, Jim Brady, Becky Wight, Catfish Prewitt. On StarStation the talent included: Peter Stewart, Bob Leonard, John Lacy, Janice Williams and others. Country Coast to Coast in the early 1990s had the phone number 1 (800) US-SONGS; which later changed to 1 (800) 457-6647; Starstation 1 (800) 832-0208.

== Former Satellite Music Network networks ==
Network Ident	Format	Notes
Pure Gold	Oldies from 1960s to 1970s	Later "Oldies Radio", now known as "Classic Hits".
The Classic Rock Experience	Classic rock	Rebranded as Classic Rock by Cumulus Media in 2011. Merged into its Westwood One counterpart in 2014.
Starstation	Adult Contemporary	Later known as "Hits and Favorites". Merged into its Westwood One counterpart in 2014.
Kool Gold	Oldies from '50s-early '60s	Discontinued by ABC Radio Networks, 1995. Eventually replaced by The True Oldies Channel. An unrelated network of the same name was created by Dial Global in 2005.
Real Country	Classic Country	Partnership with Buck Owens and flagshipped at Owens-owned KCWW in Tempe, Arizona.
Stardust	Oldies/Standards	Later "Timeless Classics", "Timeless Favorites," and "Timeless". Discontinued February 2010.
Country Coast to Coast	Country	Later "Best Country Around," now known as "Today's Best Country"
The Touch	Urban Adult Contemporary	Briefly rebranded as "MyFavStation" in 2010. Reverted to original branding.
Z Rock	Heavy Metal	Discontinued in December 1996

=== Later added by ABC ===
Network Ident	Format	Additional Notes (if any)
The Christmas Channel	Christmas Music	Available from the day before Thanksgiving through Christmas Day. Discontinued
Jack FM	Variety/Adult Hits	Spun off to Dial Global. Cumulus acquired the company and merged its Cumulus Media Networks into the new Westwood One.
Radio Disney	Children's	Retained by Disney in ABC Radio sale; discontinued on April 14, 2021.
Rejoice! Musical Soul Food	Urban Contemporary Gospel	Spun off to Urban Choice Media.
Today's Best Hits	Hot Adult Contemporary	Formerly known as "ABC Hot AC". Discontinued in 2014 after Cumulus Media Networks merged with Westwood One.
The True Oldies Channel	Oldies from 1950s to 1970s.	Retained by host and founder Scott Shannon after his departure in 2014.
Unforgettable Favorites	Soft Oldies/AC	Merged into "Stardust"/"Timeless Classics" to create new "Timeless" (formerly "Timeless Favorites") format.

= Currently active on ABC Radio.
= Active on ABC Radio on a seasonal basis.
= Divested to other companies.
= Formats combined.
= Currently discontinued.
= Retained by origin of network.
