= WIVY =

- Morehead, Kentucky; United States
- Frequency: 96.3 MHz
- Branding: 24/7 FUN!

Programming
- Format: Classic hits
- Affiliations: ABC News Radio; Westwood One; Kentucky News Network (KNN); Morehead State University Eagles Sports Network; Cincinnati Reds Radio Network; Cincinnati Bengals Radio Network

Ownership
- Owner: Gateway Radio Works, Inc.
- Sister stations: WKCA, WMST, WKYN, WWKY-AM

History
- First air date: July 1, 1994 (as WIKO)
- Former call signs: WWDQ (1992–1994); WIKO (1994–2003)

Technical information
- Licensing authority: FCC
- Facility ID: 23344
- Class: A
- ERP: 2,150 watts
- HAAT: 158 meters
- Transmitter coordinates: 38°10′33″N 83°24′28″W

Links
- Public license information: Public file; LMS
- Webcast: Listen live
- Website: wivyradio.com

WIVY (96.3 FM) is a radio station broadcasting an Classic hits format. It is licensed to Morehead, Kentucky, United States. The station is currently owned by Gateway Radio Works, Inc. and features programming from Westwood One. WIVY is the flagship and origination station for The Morehead State University Eagles Sports Network.

== History ==
The station went on the air as WWDQ on March 27, 1992. On May 23, 1994, the station changed its call sign to WIKO, and on April 10, 2003, to the current WIVY.
