= WAUR =

WAUR may refer to:

- WAUR (AM), a radio station (1550 AM) licensed to serve Somonauk, Illinois, United States
- WAUR-LD, a low-power television station (channel 29) licensed to serve Aurora, Illinois
- WKBM, a radio station (930 AM) licensed to serve Sandwich, Illinois, which held the call sign WAUR from 1988 to 2014
- WLEY-FM, a radio station (107.9 FM) licensed to serve Aurora, Illinois, which held the call sign WAUR from 1969 to 1988
