= KFFB =

Coordinates: 35.733°N 92.260°W

- Fairfield Bay, Arkansas; United States
- Frequency: 106.1 MHz
- Branding: Timeless 106.1 KFFB

Programming
- Format: News-talk-Adult standards-Adult contemporary-Oldies-Classic hits
- Affiliations: Fox News; Arkansas Radio Network

Ownership
- Owner: Freedom Broadcasting; (Freedom Broadcasting, Inc.)

History
- First air date: December 31, 1981
- Call sign meaning: FairField Bay

Technical information
- Licensing authority: FCC
- Facility ID: 57192
- Class: C2
- ERP: 15,500 watts
- HAAT: 268 meters

Links
- Public license information: Public file; LMS
- Website: kffb.com

KFFB is a radio station in Fairfield Bay, Arkansas, known as Timeless 106.1 KFFB, serving 13 counties in North Central Arkansas area. It broadcasts on FM frequency 106.1 MHz and is under ownership of Freedom Broadcasting with Bob Connell (current past president of the Arkansas Broadcasters Association (Served as President serve two non-consecutive terms) and current treasurer of the Broadcasters of Arkansas PAC) serving as General Manager/Owner. Their programming schedule consists of news from FOX News and the Arkansas Radio Network. The rest of the programming slots are filled with oldies/adult standards/adult contemporary music. Previously, the music format was syndicated by Citadel Media's Timeless and then Adult Standards Music Format from Dial Global Networks satellite feed, but as of August, 2015, its programming consists of all local programming. KFFB's website is also a major local source of news, event information, and a political Blogspot. The on-air programming is also streamed live from the website.

The station also broadcasts a Christmas Holiday basketball tournament, "The Greer's Ferry Lake Classic".

The station's other major contribution is its weather coverage. During the 2008 tornado outbreak and the winter of early 2009 ice storms, the station kept the northern region of the state up to date with information on emergency aid, shelters, and weather warnings leading up to these significant weather events.

The station lost the top 100 feet of its broadcast tower during the 2009 ice storm. Thanks to the efforts of tower crews, electricians, and station personnel, the station was off the air only a few hours. The tower was rebuilt a few weeks later with an all-new transmitter and antenna system, restoring its broadcast signal to the thirteen-county service area.
