= Roy Leonard =

American DJ and broadcaster (1931–2014)

- Born: LeRoy Stewart Leonard; January 19, 1931; Redwood Falls, Minnesota
- Died: September 4, 2014 (aged 83); Evanston, Illinois
- Presenting career
- Stations: WGN, Chicago, Illinois, USA
- Country: United States

LeRoy Stewart Leonard (January 19, 1931 – September 4, 2014) was an American radio personality, best known for hosting WGN's midday radio show from Chicago for 31 years and for his appearances on WGN-TV's news and Christmas specials. He also hosted Family Classics after Frazier Thomas died.

Leonard died on September 4, 2014, at a hospital in Evanston, Illinois, of complications from an esophageal infection, aged 83.
