= WJDK-FM =

Coordinates: 41.220°N 88.541°W

- Seneca, Illinois; United States
- Broadcast area: Morris; Dwight; Marseilles
- Frequency: 95.7 MHz
- Branding: K-Country 95.7

Programming
- Format: Country

Ownership
- Owner: Nelson Multimedia Inc.; (Grundy County Broadcasters, Inc.)
- Sister stations: WAUR; WCSJ-FM

History
- First air date: 1998

Technical information
- Licensing authority: FCC
- Facility ID: 40728
- Class: A
- ERP: 3,000 watts
- HAAT: 100 meters (330 ft)

Links
- Public license information: Public file; LMS
- Website: www.wjdkfm.com

WJDK-FM (95.7 FM) is a radio station broadcasting a country music format. Licensed to Seneca, Illinois, the station serves Grundy County and Eastern LaSalle County, and is owned by Nelson Multimedia Inc. The station began broadcasting in 1998.

On May 1, 2022, WJDK-FM changed its format from adult contemporary to country, branded as "K-Country 95.7".
