= WIBI =

Radio station in Carlinville, Illinois

Simulcasts WBGL, Champaign
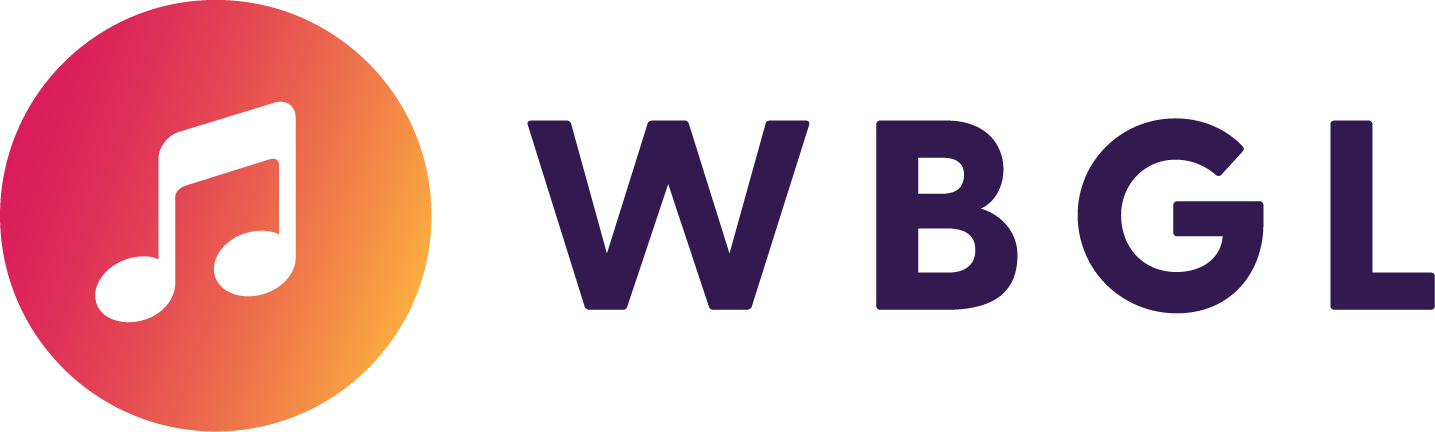
- Carlinville, Illinois; United States
- Broadcast area: Litchfield, Illinois; Springfield, Illinois; Alton, Illinois; Jacksonville, Illinois
- Frequency: 91.1 MHz
- Branding: WBGL

Programming
- Format: Christian adult contemporary

Ownership
- Owner: Northwestern Media; (University of Northwestern – St. Paul)
- Sister stations: WBGL; WCFL; WCIC

History
- First air date: September 1975
- Call sign meaning: Illinois Bible Institute

Technical information
- Licensing authority: FCC
- Facility ID: 28289
- Class: B
- ERP: 50,000 watts
- HAAT: 145 meters (476 ft)
- Transmitter coordinates: 39°20′55.1″N 89°48′17″W
- Translator: (90.1 MHz) W211AD (Granite City)

Links
- Public license information: Public file; LMS
- Webcast: Listen live
- Website: wbgl.org

WIBI (91.1 FM) is a radio station broadcasting a Christian adult contemporary format, relaying the programming of 91.7 WBGL in Champaign, Illinois. Licensed to Carlinville, Illinois, United States, the station is currently owned by the University of Northwestern – St. Paul, and is part of the New Life Media network of Christian Radio Stations.

== History ==
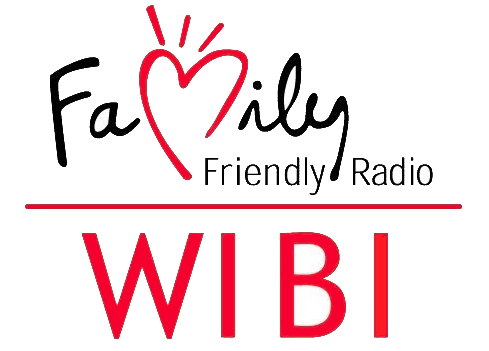
Former logo for WIBI in early 2000s

WIBI began broadcasting in September 1975 and was the first of the Illinois Bible Institute's radio stations. Over the years, it extended its signal across southern Illinois via full-power satellite WSCT in Springfield and a network of low-power translators.

In a cost-cutting move, the Illinois Bible Institute announced in early 2013 that it would end WIBI's separate operation, with its transmitters and translators to be divided between WBGL in Champaign and WCIC in Peoria. The switch took effect on February 15, 2013. WIBI and all but one of its translators became full-time satellites of WBGL, while WSCT and the translator in Jacksonville became satellites of WCIC.

In August 2019, the Illinois Bible Institute reached an agreement to sell the entire WBGL/WCIC New Life Media Network (including WIBI) to the University of Northwestern – St. Paul, which owns and operates a network of contemporary Christian stations and a network of Christian talk and teaching stations, for $9,901,558.34.
