= Classic Rock (Westwood One) =

Syndicated radio format

- Type: Radio network
- Country: United States
- Availability: National
- Owner: Westwood One
- Launch date: 1972
- Dissolved: 2014
- Former names: The Classic Rock Experience (1972-2011)

Classic Rock (formerly The Classic Rock Experience prior to 2011) is a radio network syndicate by Westwood One. It draws an adult mainstream audience between the ages of 25 and 49 with classic rock music from artists such as Aerosmith, The Allman Brothers Band, The Beatles, Phil Collins, Deep Purple, The Eagles, Jimi Hendrix, Pink Floyd, Queen, and The Rolling Stones.

The DJ line-up during ABC ownership included Chaz Mixon, Michelle Michaels, Frank Welch, Jeff Davis, Debbie Douglas, Scott Manning, and Dave Bolt. As a Westwood One format, WGRF jock Carl Russo's show was carried overnights until his 2025 retirement.

== History ==
The Classic Rock Experience was first aired in 1972 by Satellite Music Network (SMN) and has since then maintained its classic rock format to this day. The American Broadcasting Company (later Cumulus Media Networks) acquired this network from SMN in 1989.

In May 2014, it was announced that the "Classic Rock" satellite format has been discontinued after the merger of Cumulus Media Networks and Westwood One. As of 2025, Westwood One continues to offer a Classic Rock 24-hour network as a continuation of both this network and other classic rock-formatted networks previously provided by other predecessors such as Transtar, Jones and Waitt. Under Cumulus, Westwood One attempted spin-off networks Rock 2.0 and Classic Rock X with more contemporary material; these were discontinued in April 2025.

== Sample hour of programming ==
- "Brown Sugar" - The Rolling Stones
- "Money" - Pink Floyd
- "We Will Rock You"/"We Are The Champions" - Queen
- "Purple Haze" - The Jimi Hendrix Experience
- "Slow Ride" - Foghat
- "Don't Stop Believin'" - Journey
- "Old Time Rock and Roll" - Bob Seger & The Silver Bullet Band
- "In The Air Tonight" - Phil Collins
- "Won't Get Fooled Again" - The Who
- "Smoke on the Water" - Deep Purple
- "Walk This Way" - Aerosmith
- "Kashmir" - Led Zeppelin

== Affiliates ==
This is a partial list.

- Rock Springs, Wyoming - KSIT
- Tatum, New Mexico - KTUM
- Wenatchee, Washington - KZPH
