= WCIC =

Radio station in Pekin–Peoria, Illinois

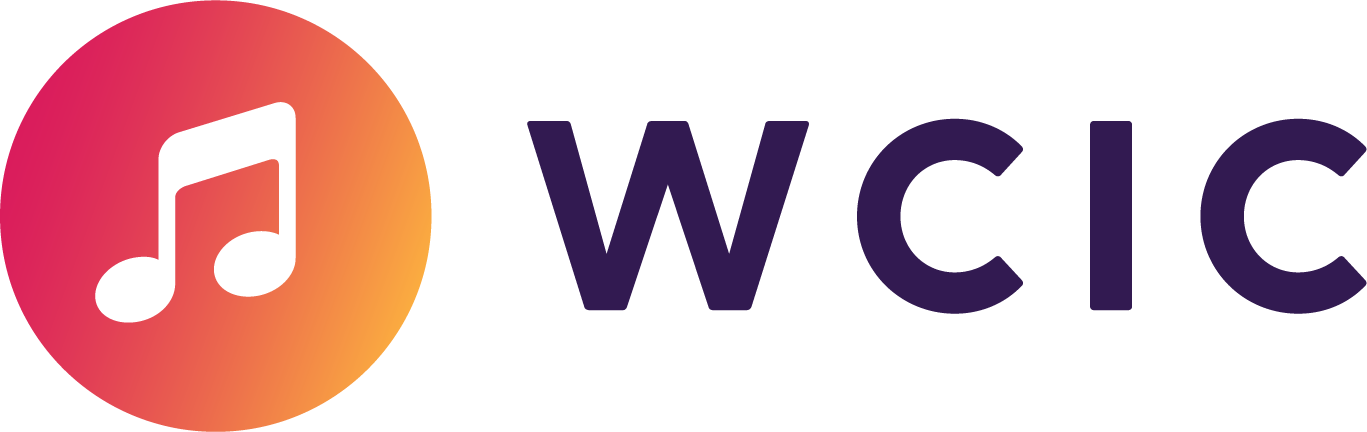

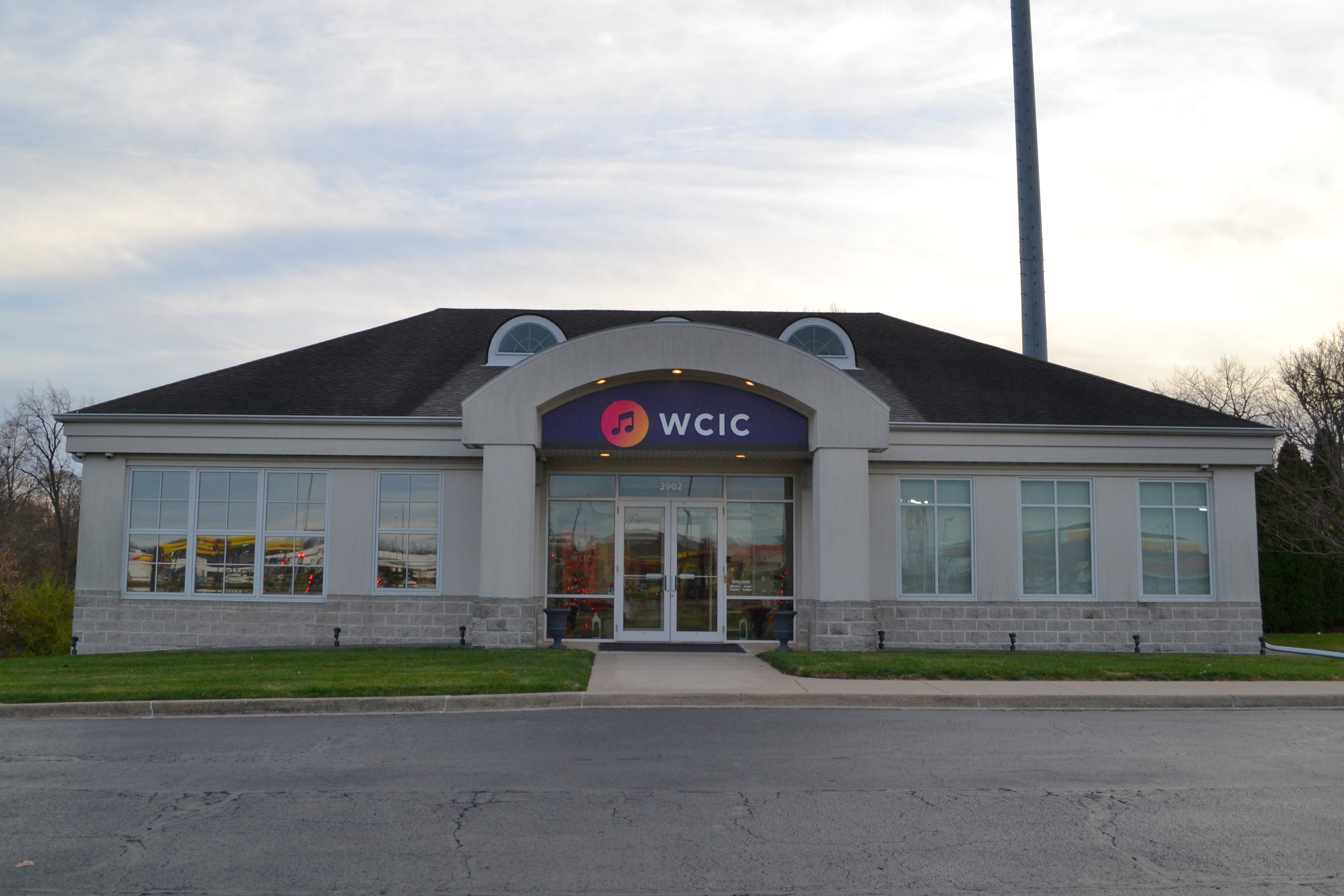
- WCIC Studio in Peoria
- Pekin, Illinois; United States
- Broadcast area: Peoria, Illinois
- Frequency: 91.5 MHz

Programming
- Format: Christian adult contemporary

Ownership
- Owner: Northwestern Media; (University of Northwestern – St. Paul)
- Sister stations: WBGL; WCFL; WIBI

History
- First air date: November 1983

Technical information
- Licensing authority: FCC
- Facility ID: 28301
- Class: B
- ERP: 47,000 watts
- HAAT: 154 meters (505 ft)
- Transmitter coordinates: 40°33′28.1″N 89°34′4.4″W
- Translator: See § Translators
- Repeater: See § Repeaters

Links
- Public license information: Public file; LMS
- Webcast: Listen live
- Website: www.wcicfm.org

WCIC is a Christian adult contemporary music station in Peoria, Illinois. It is licensed to the nearby suburb of Pekin and owned by the University of Northwestern – St. Paul. Studios are located in northwest Peoria.

== Repeaters ==
In addition to the main station at 91.5, WCIC simulcasts on full-power satellites WPRC 88.7 in Sheffield, Illinois (serving Sterling and Rock Falls), WSCT 90.5 in Springfield, Illinois and relays via an additional five translators. Between them, WCIC's network stretches across most of west-central Illinois and eastern Iowa.

Call sign	Frequency	City of license	State	Facility ID	Class	ERP (W)	Height (m (ft))
WPRC	88.7 FM	Sheffield	Illinois	173264	B1	8,500	127 m (417 ft)
WSCT	90.5 FM	Springfield	Illinois	28285	A	3,800	125 m (410 ft)

=== Translators ===
Call sign	Frequency (MHz)	City of license	State	Facility ID	Class	ERP (W)	Height (m (ft))
K247BW	97.3	Bettendorf	Iowa	140129	D	40	95 m (312 ft)
W255AI	98.9	Bloomington	Illinois	28297	D	55	54 m (177 ft)
W212AN	90.3	Jacksonville	Illinois	28295	D	55	76 m (249 ft)
W219DV	91.7	Jacksonville	Illinois	87717	D	38	46 m (151 ft)
W263AO	100.5	Galesburg	Illinois	81198	D	19	99.2 m (325 ft)

== Frequency areas ==
- 91.5 WCIC Pekin, Peoria, Havana, Canton, Washington, Bartonville, Lewistown, Morton, Dunlap, and Surrounding Areas.
- 90.5 WSCT Springfield, Lincoln, Petersburg, Taylorville, Rochester, Chatham, Athens, Auburn, Sherman, Pawnee, Oakford, Kincaid, Mt. Pulaski and Surrounding Areas.
- 88.7 WPRC Sheffield, Sterling, Rock Falls, and Surrounding Areas.
- 90.3 W212AN & 91.7 W219DV Jacksonville, Waverly, Alexander, and Surrounding Areas.
- 98.9 W255AI Bloomington-Normal, LeRoy, Shirley, Heyworth, Towanda, Lexington, and Surrounding Areas.
- 100.5 W263AO Galesburg, Knoxville, Williamsfield, East Galesburg, and Surrounding Areas.
- 97.3 K247BW Bettendorf, Davenport, Moline, East Moline, Rock Island, and Surrounding Areas.

== New Life Media Network ==
WCIC and Champaign-based sister station WBGL are part of the Northwestern Media. Between them, the two stations and their satellites and repeaters cover almost two-thirds of Illinois, as well as portions of Missouri, Iowa, and Indiana.

On August 6, 2019, the Illinois Bible Institute reached an agreement to sell the entire WBGL/WCIC New Life Media Network to the University of Northwestern – St. Paul, which owns and operates a network of contemporary Christian stations and a network of Christian talk and teaching stations, for $9,901,558.34.
