= Dennis Berry =

English musician, composer, arranger, and producer (1921–1994)

- Also known as: Peter Dennis, Frank Sterling, Jack Sharp, Charles Kenbury
- Born: 21 August 1921; London, England
- Died: 21 June 1994 (aged 72) Hertfordshire, England
- Genres: Light music, classical, jazz
- Occupations: Composer/arranger, producer
- Years active: 1939–1992
- Spouse: Aaltje Wolschryn (m. 1949)

Dennis Alfred Berry (21 August 1921 – 21 June 1994) was an English musician, composer, arranger, and producer. His work has been used in film-making and television productions.

== Early life ==
Born in London, England, Berry was involved in music from the age of fourteen. He played bass, guitar, and saxophone. He also taught himself French, Dutch, Afrikaans, and German.

== Marriage and family ==
In 1949 he married Netherlands-born Aaltje Wolschryn, and they had one child. He had lived in London until his marriage. Then he and his wife moved to the new town of Stevenage, before building a house on a plot of land (which they bought from Peter Sellers) in the centre of Welwyn Garden City.

== Career ==
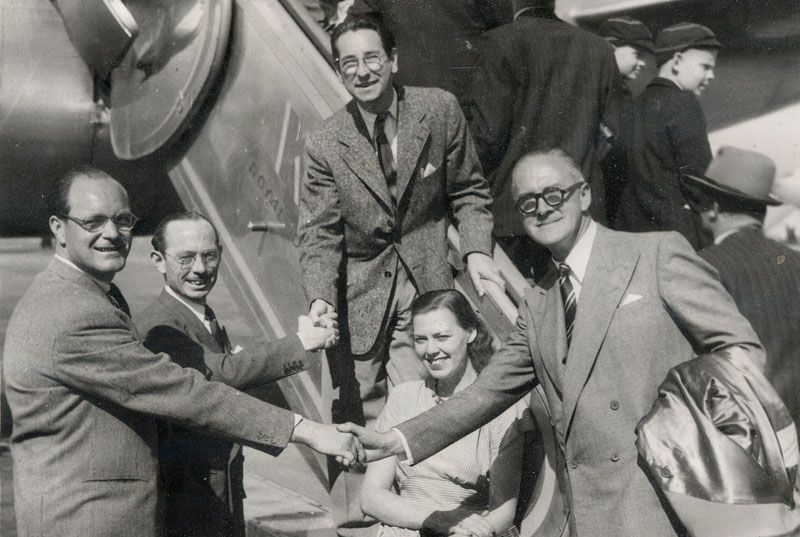
Dennis Berry (centre top), his wife, and members of the Dutch Songwriters' Guild

In 1939 Berry joined Francis, Day, and Hunter as a copyist before going on to Boosey & Hawkes as a staff arranger, then to Lawrence Wright and Paxton Music, and finally Peer-Southern. He arranged for Carroll Gibbons, The Squadronaires, and Ted Heath. As Paxton's representative he was based in Amsterdam, and became staff arranger for the Skymasters Dance Orchestra and freelanced for The Ramblers and the Metropole.

He was a correspondent for Variety and Melody Maker.

In 1949 he returned to Paxton's offices in England, where he worked in their music library, producing background music for films, television, radio, and worldwide distribution. During the 1950s he became the head of the library and published one of his most successful pieces, a composition of his own called Holiday in Hollywood. During this time he was also a representative of the Dutch Songwriter's Guild.

Berry had started composing some years earlier, and his early works included "Apple Honey", "Boston Bounce", and "You Couldn't Be Sweeter". Some of these can now be found on the iTunes Store, as part of compilations of light classical music.

As well as using his own name, he composed under various pseudonyms, including Frank Sterling (in collaboration with Stuart Crombie), Jack Sharp, Charles Kenbury, Michael Rodney and (more commonly) Peter Dennis. This was to avoid any signs of favouritism on behalf of the record labels, as he was publishing his own music. He conducted the Peter Dennis Band and the Peter Dennis Orchestra on several LP recordings, but these were most likely groups made up of session musicians rather than typical membership-based groups. In the early 1960s, he joined the record label Conroy Music – sometimes referred to as Berry/Conroy (although the Berry in the name is actually that of Roy Berry, no relation) – which published a large amount of library music. One piece, Moviescope, was selected to be the theme to the WGN-TV television series Family Classics.

While working at Paxton's library and later as manager of the Southern Music Library (now Peer-Southern), he was responsible for including compositions by Dolf Van Den Linden, Johnny Scott, and Barry Forgie on their library records, as well as his own. He produced many of the recordings, an activity which he continued on a freelance basis after he retired. This included a number of sessions in Germany, working on films such as The Beastmaster (1982) and The NeverEnding Story II: The Next Chapter, and also arrangements of classics for the de Wolfe library.

Berry also worked on the first Monty Python film And Now For Something Completely Different, and collaborated with artists such as Johnny Dankworth and Roger Roger. His work (both compositions and production) was often heard on BBC test card.

== Death and legacy ==
After retiring, he and his wife emigrated to South Africa for two years, before returning to life in Hertfordshire for the rest of his life. Although he died in 1994, his work continues to be used worldwide, frequently as incidental music in television, most recently in BBC's Little Britain and Dick and Dom in da Bungalow, MTV's The Osbournes and the Nickelodeon cartoons Rocko's Modern Life and SpongeBob SquarePants. His music was also used by Disney in an in-hotel promotional video for the Disneyland Resort Paris theme park.

== List of recordings (incomplete) ==
All recordings are on the Peer International Library label unless otherwise stated.

| Date | Album name | Band/orchestra | Mono/stereo | Role | Library number |
|---|---|---|---|---|---|
| 1970 | Soul of a City | Leon Hardt and his Orchestra | Mono | Composer (one track) and producer | PIL 9004 |
| 1971 | Combustion, Big Band Sound | Barry Forgie Orchestra | Mono | Composer (one track) and producer | PIL 9008 |
| 1971 | No Waiting | Peter Dennis Orchestra | Mono | Composer (three tracks) and producer | PIL 9012 |
| 1972 | Zenith | Peter Dennis Orchestra | Mono | Composer (one track) and producer | PIL 9014 |
| 1973 | Flip Top | The Barry Moore Combo | Mono | Composer (five tracks) and producer | PIL 9021 |
| 1976 | Trendy | Frank Sterling Big Band | Stereo | Composer (three tracks) and producer | PIL 9032 |
| 1980 | Pretty Pose | Peter Dennis Orchestra | Stereo | Composer (nine tracks) and producer | PIL 9042 |
| 2002 (Compilation) | Classic Film & TV, Vol 2; Matinee Mania | Peter Dennis Orchestra/Frank Sterling Big Band | Stereo | Composer and producer (three tracks) | Bruton BRO19/354 |
| 2002 (Compilation) | Classic Film & TV, Vol 3; Radio Times | Peter Dennis Orchestra/Frank Sterling Big Band | Stereo | Composer and producer (two tracks) | Bruton BRO20/355 |
