= WBGL =

Christian radio station in Champaign, Illinois

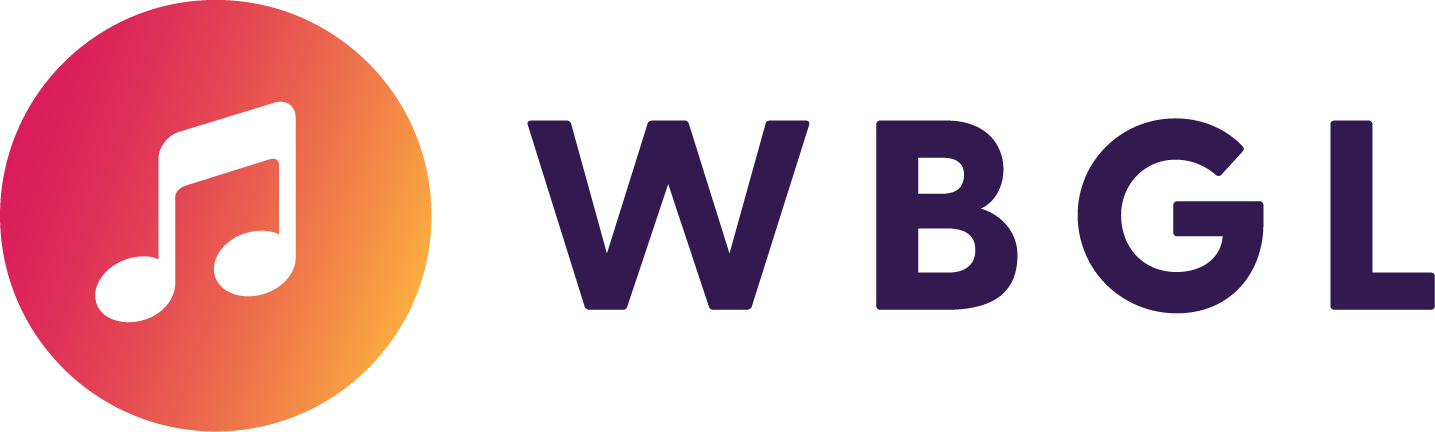
- Champaign, Illinois; United States
- Broadcast area: Champaign-Urbana
- Frequency: 91.7 MHz
- Branding: WBGL

Programming
- Format: Christian adult contemporary

Ownership
- Owner: Northwestern Media; (University of Northwestern – St. Paul)
- Sister stations: WCFL; WCIC; WIBI

History
- First air date: October 1982
- Call sign meaning: We Bring God's Love

Technical information
- Licensing authority: FCC
- Facility ID: 28296
- Class: B
- ERP: 20,000 watts
- HAAT: 140 meters (460 ft)
- Transmitter coordinates: 40.153°N 88.116°W
- Translator: See § Translators
- Repeater: See § Relay stations

Links
- Public license information: Public file; LMS
- Webcast: Listen Now
- Website: wbgl.org

WBGL (91.7 FM) is a non-commercial, listener-supported radio station licensed to Champaign, Illinois and owned by the University of Northwestern – St. Paul. It carries a Christian adult contemporary format. The studios are on Fieldstone Road in Champaign.

WBGL is a Class B FM station. It has an effective radiated power (ERP) of 20,000 watts. The signal covers Champaign-Urbana and part of Central Illinois.

== Relay stations ==
WBGL is relayed by 9 full-power FM stations and three low-power FM translators. Their combined footprint provides at least secondary coverage from the outer southern suburbs of Chicago to the Illinois side of the St. Louis area to southeastern Missouri.

Call sign	Frequency	City of license	State	Facility ID	Class	ERP (W)	Height (m (ft))
WIBI	91.1 FM	Carlinville	Illinois	28289	B	50,000	145 m (476 ft)
WZGL	88.1 FM	Charleston	Illinois	83381	A	2,100	69.9 m (229 ft)
WBGL	91.7 FM	Champaign	Illinois	28296	B	20,000	140 m (460 ft)
WNLD	88.1 FM	Decatur	Illinois	28294	A	1,000	93 m (305 ft)
WCBW-FM	89.7 FM	East St. Louis	Illinois	83448	A	250	57 m (187 ft)
WCFL	104.7 FM	Morris	Illinois	28304	B	50,000	137 m (449 ft)
WBMV	89.7 FM	Mount Vernon	Illinois	28302	B1	10,500	150 m (490 ft)
WIMB	89.1 FM	Murphysboro	Illinois	172907	A	3,500	31.8 m (104 ft)
WVNL	91.7 FM	Vandalia	Illinois	92248	A	100	50 m (160 ft)
WCRT-FM	88.5 FM	Terre Haute	Indiana	28293	A	1,050	98 m (322 ft)

=== Translators ===
Call sign	Frequency (MHz)	City of license	State	Facility ID	Class	ERP (W)	Height (m (ft))
W230BS	93.9	Effingham	Illinois	145216	D	38	64.8 m (213 ft)
W211AD	90.1	Granite City	Illinois	21503	D	60	32 m (105 ft)
K295FB	106.9	Cape Girardeau	Missouri	148624	D	92	65 m (213 ft)

== Northwestern Media ==
Logo prior to the sale to Northwestern Media

WBGL and Peoria-based sister station WCIC are part of Northwestern Media, a ministry of University of Northwestern - St. Paul. Between them, the two stations and their satellites and repeaters cover almost two-thirds of Illinois, as well as portions of Missouri, Iowa, and Indiana.

The station was founded by the Illinois District of the Assemblies of God and operated by its media arm, the Illinois Bible Institute. In August 2019, the Illinois Bible Institute reached an agreement to sell the entire WBGL/WCIC New Life Media Network to the University of Northwestern – St. Paul, which owns and operates a network of contemporary Christian stations and a network of Christian talk and teaching stations. The price tag was $9,901,558.34, plus $200,000 in third-party underwriting announcements for the seller's non-broadcast, non-profit activities, that would continue for one year. The closing date was November 1, 2019.
