= WWKY (AM) =

- Winchester, Kentucky; United States
- Broadcast area: Winchester; Central Kentucky (Daytime)
- Frequency: 990 kHz
- Branding: 102.9 FM and AM 990 WWKY

Programming
- Format: Soft adult contemporary
- Affiliations: NBC News Radio; Kentucky News Network; Compass Media Networks

Ownership
- Owner: Gateway Radio Work, Inc.
- Sister stations: WKYN, WMST, WKCA, WIVY-FM

History
- First air date: August 8, 1981 (as WLPQ at 980)
- Former call signs: WLPQ (1980–1986); WKPJ (1986); WMAK (1986–1996); WGWM (1996–2017)
- Former frequencies: 980 kHz (1986–2018)
- Call sign meaning: "Wonderful Winchester, Kentucky"

Technical information
- Licensing authority: FCC
- Facility ID: 24221
- Class: D
- Power: 1,000 watts day; 20 watts night
- Transmitter coordinates: 38°00′50.3″N 84°09′15.7″W
- Translator: 102.9 W275CO (Winchester)

Links
- Public license information: Public file; LMS
- Webcast: Listen Live
- Website: wwkyradio.com

WWKY (990 kHz) is an AM radio station broadcasting a soft adult contemporary format. Licensed to Winchester, Kentucky, the station and FM translator primarily serves Clark County but the AM signal can be listened to in much of the Bluegrass region of Central Kentucky in the daytime. The station is owned by Gateway Radio Work, Inc.

== History ==
The station went on the air August 8, 1981, as WLPQ, broadcasting from Pittsburg, Kentucky; it became WKPJ on February 5, 1986. On February 21, 1986, the station changed its call sign to WMAK, and on June 24, 1996, changed it again, to WGWM. The station changed its call sign to the current WWKY on May 15, 2017.

Originally licensed to serve London, Kentucky, at 980 AM, the station moved to a new transmitter and operating on 990 AM in Winchester effective February 2, 2018.
