= WSPY-FM =

Radio station in Plano, Illinois

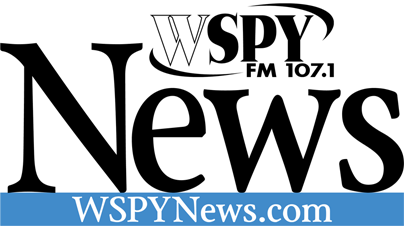
- Plano, Illinois; United States
- Broadcast area: Fox Valley–West Suburban Chicago
- Frequency: 107.1 MHz
- Branding: WSPY FM 107.1

Programming
- Format: Adult contemporary; full service
- Affiliations: Nelson Multimedia Inc.

Ownership
- Owner: Larry and Pam Nelson
- Sister stations: WDYS; WSQR

History
- First air date: January 19, 1974
- Call sign meaning: Its city of license and communities served; Sandwich, Plano and Yorkville

Technical information
- Licensing authority: FCC
- Facility ID: 48247
- Class: A
- ERP: 3,100 watts
- HAAT: 142.0 meters (465.9 ft)
- Transmitter coordinates: 41°39′55.00″N 88°34′34.00″W
- Translator: 95.1 W236DB (Plano)

Links
- Public license information: Public file; LMS
- Website: wspynews.com

WSPY-FM (107.1 MHz) is a radio station broadcasting an adult contemporary/full service format. Licensed to Plano, Illinois, United States, it serves the Fox Valley and Chicago's far west suburbs.

WSPY-FM 107.1 was founded by Larry and Pam Nelson. The first air date for WSPY-FM was on January 19, 1974, and has never been off the air. WSPY-FM covers high school sports, local news and events for the Fox Valley.
