= WCSJ-FM =

Classic hits radio station in Morris, Illinois

- Morris, Illinois; United States
- Broadcast area: Chicago metropolitan area
- Frequency: 103.1 MHz
- Branding: Classic Hits WCSJ

Programming
- Format: Full service classic hits

Ownership
- Owner: Nelson Multimedia Inc.; (Grundy County Broadcasters, Inc.)
- Sister stations: WAUR; WJDK-FM

History
- First air date: 1993 (as WJDK)
- Former call signs: WJDK (1993–1998); WYXX (1998–2004)

Technical information
- Licensing authority: FCC
- Facility ID: 17038
- Class: A
- ERP: 6,000 watts
- HAAT: 100 meters (330 ft)
- Transmitter coordinates: 41°17′35.1″N 88°20′4.2″W

Links
- Public license information: Public file; LMS
- Website: www.wcsjfm.com

WCSJ-FM (103.1 MHz) is a commercial radio station in Morris, Illinois. It airs a full service, classic hits radio format and is owned and operated by Nelson Multimedia Inc. WCSJ-FM's programming includes local news, high school sports, a weekly fishing and outdoor program, and NASCAR racing.

WCSJ's studios are on Washington Street in downtown Morris. The transmitter is off East McArdle Road in Coal City. WCSJ's sister stations are WAUR and WJDK-FM. WCSJ, WAUR and WJDK are the only local radio stations in Grundy County, Illinois.

== History ==
=== WJDK ===
The station began broadcasting in 1993, holding the call sign WJDK and airing an adult contemporary format. In 1997, the station was sold to Big City Radio.

=== WYXX ===
In February 1998, the station's call sign was changed to WYXX and it adopted a rhythmic oldies format branded "Chicago's Heart and Soul", simulcasting 103.1 WXXY in Highland Park, Illinois, with the station's call sign and adult contemporary format moving to 95.7. In August 1999, WYXX and WXXY adopted a 1980s hits format as "The Eighties Channel," with the station patterned on high-energy CHR stations of the 1980s. The station featured longtime Chicago area radio personalities including Robert Murphy, Fred Winston, and Mark Zander.

In 2001, WYXX and WXXY adopted a Spanish hits format, branded "Viva 103.1". By January 2003, the station had ended its simulcast with WXXY, and adopted a dance hits format as "Party 103.1".

=== WCSJ-FM ===
In late 2003, the station was sold to Larry Nelson for $426,000. In January 2004, the station's call sign was changed to WCSJ-FM, and it adopted a mix of soft oldies and adult standards as an affiliate of ABC Radio's "Timeless" network.

After the shutdown of Timeless in February 2010, WCSJ-FM adopted a classic hits format. It combines hits of the 1970s, 1980s and 1990s with local news and high school sports.
