= The Christmas Channel =

American radio network

- Type: Seasonal Radio network
- Country: United States
- Availability: National
- Owner: Cumulus Media Networks (through Cumulus Media)
- Launch date: November 26, 1998 as seasonal programming block. November 23, 2006 as separate channel.

The Christmas Channel was an American radio network that primarily aired traditional and popular Christmas music to 35 affiliate radio stations across the United States. The Christmas Channel was a property of Cumulus Media Networks (through Cumulus Media) and was active from the day before Thanksgiving Day through Christmas Day.

== History ==
"The Christmas Channel" ident used during the ABC Radio Networks era (1998-2009)

"The Christmas Channel" started out as seasonal programming on ABC Radio's Memories/Unforgettable Favorites satellite format in 1998 under The Walt Disney Company's control. On Thanksgiving Day, ABC Radio would switch programming to Christmas music and the day after Christmas Day, it would switch back to regular programming. With the merger of "Unforgettable Favorites" and "Timeless Classics" in 2006, "The Christmas Channel" became a stand-alone network. In 2007, this network (as well as other ABC Radio formats) were transferred to Citadel Broadcasting. Citadel merged with Cumulus Media on September 16, 2011.

Citadel has indicated that The Christmas Channel would air, instead of on its usual separate channel, in place of the Classic Hits format Citadel distributes for the 2010 season. The stand-alone network returned in 2011, this time launching on November 1 to accommodate early adopters.

Cumulus Media Networks was the only commercial network to carry such a seasonal format; its former competitor, Dial Global, along with its recently purchased assets Jones and Waitt, did not offer such a format. As Cumulus Media Networks merged with Dial Global to form Westwood One, the channel was discontinued.

As of 2024, Westwood One continues to carry an all-Christmas feed year-round, known as "The Westwood One Santa Stream."

== Sample Hour of Programming ==
- "It's Beginning to Look a Lot Like Christmas" - Bing Crosby
- "Sleigh Ride" - Boston Pops Orchestra
- "Christmastime Is Here (Vocal Version)" - Vince Guaraldi
- "Wonderful Christmastime" - Paul McCartney
- "Christmas Eve/Sarajevo 12/24" - Trans-Siberian Orchestra
- "O Come All Ye Faithful" - Mormon Tabernacle Choir
- "Merry Christmas Darling" - The Carpenters
- "What Child Is This?" - Kenny G
- "Rockin' Around the Christmas Tree" - Brenda Lee
- "Feliz Navidad" - José Feliciano
- "O Holy Night" - Josh Groban
- "Rudolph the Red-Nosed Reindeer" - Gene Autry
- "The Christmas Song" - Nat King Cole
- "Santa Baby" - Eartha Kitt

== Affiliates (partial list) ==
- Chicago, Illinois - WLS-AM
- Detroit, Michigan - WJR-AM
- New York City, New York - WABC-AM
- Oak Ridge, Tennessee - WCYQ
- San Francisco, California - KSFO-AM

Data as of December 6, 2007.
