= Best Country Today =

Syndicated country music radio format

- Type: Radio network
- Branding: Best Country Today
- Country: United States
- Availability: National; also distributed in Canada, Europe, Armed Forces Radio
- Owner: Westwood One
- Key people: Gary Reynolds, Alan Keith, Carl Anderson, Mark Edwards (retired), Dave Nicholson (retired)
- Launch date: 1985
- Dissolved: 2014
- Former names: Country Coast-to-Coast

Best Country Today (formerly known as Country Coast-to-Coast, The Best Country Around and Today's Best Country) was one of the 24-hour live formats produced by Cumulus Media Networks. It is designed to appeal to a wide range of listeners, concentrating on a younger audience than would generally listen to traditional Country stations. It is one of two country formats produced by Cumulus, the other being Real Country, which skews toward older listeners.

Some of the featured artists were Kenny Chesney, Faith Hill, George Strait, The Wreckers and other contemporary country music artists.

== History ==
Beginning as one of the original Satellite Music Network formats over 30 years ago, its studios and offices were located in Mokena, Illinois, just outside Chicago. Shortly after SMN was purchased by ABC/Capital Cities in 1990, the format was moved to Dallas, Texas, along with the other SMN formats such as The Touch, Timeless Classics, The Classic Rock Experience, Oldies Radio, Hits & Favorites, Real Country, and Today's Best Hits had previously been established at the Dallas location. In its over 20-year history, Today's Best Country/Country Coast-To-Coast has had three Operations Managers, Mark Edwards, Dave Nicholson and Gary Reynolds.

Citadel Broadcasting purchased ABC Radio Networks (now Cumulus Media Networks) and the ABC Owned and Operated radio stations from The Walt Disney Company in February 2006 and continue to use the ABC name for several years afterward. The Citadel acquisition does not include Radio Disney or the ESPN radio stations. Citadel merged with Cumulus Media on September 16, 2011.

Best Country Today was discontinued months after Cumulus Media Networks' merger with Westwood One as there's already a contemporary country music satellite format.

== Programming ==
Hosts heard on Best Country Today included Charlie Derek, Darcy, Cadillac Jack, Jeremy Robinson, and Chaz Mixon. American Country Countdown is distributed on the network on weekends. Robinson's show was also syndicated outside the network as an evening show.

== Alumni ==
- Jim Beedle
- Mark Edwards
- Doug Thompson
- Jim Brady (deceased)
- Hubcap Carter (deceased)
- Ted Clark
- Kurt Schaeffer
- Bob Forester
- Michael Hardeman
- Ed Leal
- Bill Lee
- Dave Marcum
- Catfish Prewitt
- Steve Sharp
- Joe Soto
- Jerry Walker
- Jim Weaver
- Becky Wight
- Randy Williams
- Jim Casey
- Bill Fortune
- Gary Semro
