= WDYS (AM) =

Radio station in Geneva, Illinois

- Somonauk, Illinois; United States
- Broadcast area: DeKalb County–Fox Valley
- Frequency: 1480 kHz
- Branding: Woody Country

Programming
- Format: Country

Ownership
- Owner: Nelson Multimedia Inc.
- Sister stations: WSPY-FM, WSQR

History
- First air date: November 11, 1961
- Former call signs: WGSB (1961–1980); WFXW (1980–2002); WSPY (2002–2021)
- Call sign meaning: DeKalb County, Yorkville and Sandwich or Somonauk

Technical information
- Licensing authority: FCC
- Facility ID: 69700
- Class: D
- Power: 250 watts (day); 10 watts (night)
- Transmitter coordinates: 41°34′59″N 88°36′05″W
- Translator: 101.5 W268DB (Yorkville)

Links
- Public license information: Public file; LMS

WDYS (1480 kHz) is a commercial AM radio station licensed to Somonauk, Illinois, United States, serving DeKalb County and the Fox Valley, suburbs west of Chicago. It is owned by Nelson Multimedia Inc. and features country format known as "Woody County 101.5". The studios and transmitter are co-located on Frazier Road in Plano.

Programming is also heard on 250-watt FM translator W268DB (101.5 FM), licensed to Yorkville.

== History ==
=== WGSB ===
The station signed on the air on November 11, 1961, as WGSB, standing for Geneva, St. Charles, Batavia, or "Where Good Sounds Begin". The station was originally owned by the Fox Valley Broadcasting Corporation. Nelda Brickhouse, wife of WGN-TV sportscaster Jack Brickhouse, bought into the station 1966, purchasing controlling interest in 1970. For many years, the station was known as the "Voice of the Fox River Valley".

The station primarily aired easy listening music, but in 1964 the station began carrying Dick Biondi's syndicated program from the Mutual Broadcasting System. The station also carried the Jim Ameche Show, along with community programming including high school sports and local call in program "Party Line". Bill Blough hosted an overnight country music program on the station from 1967 to 1970, and again in the late 1970s. The station otherwise aired a MOR format throughout the 1970s.

=== WFXW ===
In 1980, the station was purchased by Howard Miller, a former disc jockey and talk show host on 560 WIND. In December 1980, Miller changed the station's call sign to WFXW, after being unable to obtain the call letters WFOX. In 1983, the station was sold to Gamel Broadcasting for $580,000. In 1988, Louis Pignatelli purchased a controlling interest in the station.

WFXW aired a full service format, with local talk programs and a strong emphasis on local affairs, along with adult contemporary music. The station also aired big band and oldies programs, as well as farm reports, Paul Harvey, and Pacific Garden Mission's radio drama Unshackled!. By 1998, the station had adopted a classic hits format. In 2001, the station was taken off the air, and its transmitter site was sold for residential development. The station was sold to Nelson Multimedia later that year.

=== WSPY ===
The station's call sign was changed to WSPY in 2002, and the station returned to the air under special temporary authority (STA), running 125 watts, using a long wire antenna in Batavia, Illinois. The station aired an adult standards format, and was branded "Timeless Favorites", carrying Timeless network programming from Citadel Broadcasting until the network's shutdown in February 2010. The station then adopted a classic hits format, with programming from Cumulus Broadcasting's (formerly Citadel Media) Classic Hits network.

In late summer of 2011, the station switched back to an adult standards format, with programming from Dial Global's America's Best Music. Until 2020, the station continued to operate under the aforementioned STA. In May 2020, WSPY got a construction permit to move its city of license to Somonauk. The studios moved in late 2020. Its call sign was changed to WDYS on May 1, 2021 and 1480 and 101.5 are airing country music.
