= Dean Richards (reporter) =

American film critic and entertainment reporter

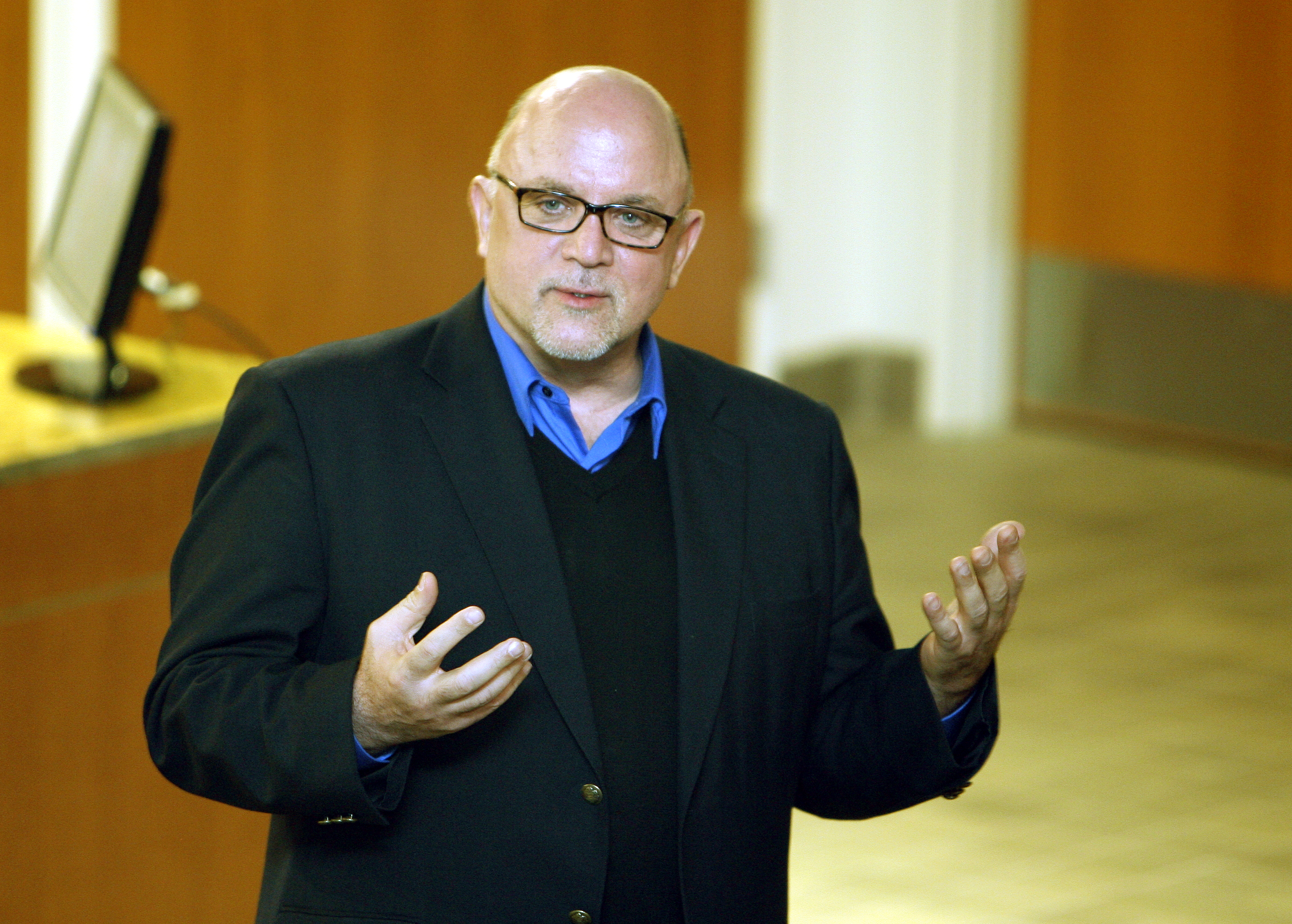
- Richards in 2012
- Born: March 31, 1954 (age 72); Chicago, Illinois, U.S.
- Education: Columbia College Chicago
- Occupations: Film Critic/Former Entertainment Reporter at WGN-TV; Radio Host at WGN (AM)
- Years active: 1975–present

Dean Richards (born March 31, 1954) is an American film critic and was the entertainment reporter for WGN-TV and a longtime radio host for WGN (AM) in Chicago.

== Early life and education ==
Now living on Chicago's northwest side, Richards is a native of Chicago's South Shore and West Beverly neighborhoods, Richards graduated from Columbia College Chicago.

== Professional career ==
Richards began his career in radio in 1975, holding a variety of jobs in Chicago at stations like WLTD (now WCGO), WMRO and WAUR, Aurora; WFYR (now WKSC-FM), WCFL (now WMVP), WIND (AM) and WCLR. In 1984, he also did voiceover work for WPWR-TV Channel 60. From 1985 until 1990, he doubled as operations manager and morning host at the Satellite Music Network, which was based in Chicago's southwest suburbs.

In 1990, Richards joined WNUA in Chicago as a weekend and substitute radio host. In May 1991, Richards remained at WNUA, but took a job as a staff announcer at WGN-TV.

In July 1991, Richards was promoted to become WNUA's morning host after its previous morning host, Yvonne Daniels, died. In the summer of 1994, Richards' contract was not renewed at WNUA. Almost immediately after leaving WNUA, Richards became a fill-in radio host at WGN (AM) in Chicago. In December 1994, the station gave him a Sunday afternoon program of his own.

In the spring of 1995, Richards was promoted to become WGN's production director, primarily overseeing production of radio commercials. By October 1995, Richards was given a Saturday afternoon shift at WGN as well.

In 1998, Richards successfully persuaded Chicago officials to rename a portion of Addison Street in Chicago near the WGN-TV studios after Bob Bell, who had played Bozo the Clown on WGN-TV from 1960 until 1984.

In January 1999, Richards debuted as a Sunday morning radio host on WGN. In January 2000, Richards began delivering weekly theater reviews on noon newscasts WGN-TV in Chicago. At the time, Richards was also a part of the regular rotation of hosts of Illinois Lottery drawings, which take place at the WGN-TV studios.

In 2001, Richards switched to delivering his weekly theater reviews on WGN-TV's morning newscasts. In 2004, Richards began covering show business for WGN-TV, including conducting hundreds of celebrity interviews. In January 2010, Richards' production duties were cut at WGN-AM radio.

On February 24 2026, the Chicago Sun-Times reported that Richards was one of 8 reporters let go by WGN due to budget constraints.

== Mel Gibson incident ==
On January 29, 2010, WGN-TV aired an interview that Richards conducted with actor Mel Gibson via a remote feed about his new film, Edge of Darkness, and then queried Gibson about how the public perceives him, given his noted drunken outburst and anti-Semitic rant while being arrested in 2006. The line of questioning annoyed Gibson, who told Richards, "That's almost four years ago, dude. I mean, I've moved on. I guess you haven't." After the interview, Gibson — unaware that the camera was still rolling and that he was still on air — took a sip of coffee and used the term "asshole," presumably directed at Richards. Gibson and his publicist both later claimed that the remark was directed at Gibson's publicist; a remark later proven false by insiders who were in the studio with Gibson at the time.

== Awards ==
Since joining WGN-AM, Richards has won over 30 local and national awards for programming and production.

== Personal ==
In September 2007, Richards faced a cancer scare when he had his thyroid gland removed. Richards has been a long-time supporter of Gilda's Club, a support organization for cancer survivors founded by Gene Wilder, the husband of comedian Gilda Radner. Since the early 2000s he has given over one week of his radio show a year to support the organization and to share with and tell the stories of Gilda's Club members.
