= Unforgettable Favorites =

Satellite radio feed (1998–2006)

- Type: Radio network
- Country: United States
- Availability: National
- Owner: ABC Radio Networks (through The Walt Disney Company)
- Launch date: 1998
- Dissolved: 2006
- Former names: Memories

Unforgettable Favorites (also known as Memories) was a satellite driven format distributed by ABC Radio Networks (through The Walt Disney Company). Unforgettable Favorites was a middle-of-the-road station and featured music from The Carpenters, Neil Diamond, Carly Simon, James Taylor, The Bee Gees, The Beatles, Linda Ronstadt, The Beach Boys and many others.

== History ==
ABC Radio launched the format in late 1998 under the name "Memories"; "Unforgettable Favorites" was used as its slogan and secondary branding. Many American radio stations began using this feed, including ABC owned & operated KMEO 96.7 FM (now Cumulus-owned KTCK-FM) in Flower Mound, Texas. Another station that used the "Memories / Unforgettable Favorites" audio feed was KMMZ 96.9 FM, "Memories 96.9", now KQOB, broadcasting to the Oklahoma City metropolitan area and the Enid, Oklahoma area. KMMZ dropped Unforgettable Favorites in November 2002 and became a country music station. 2003 through 2005 proved to be a decline of "Memories" as some stations switched formats.

In the Summer of 2006, "Unforgettable Favorites" was discontinued and then merged into the adult standards format "Timeless Classics" and used the new branding "Timeless Favorites" up until a year later when it rebranded itself as simply "Timeless"—about the same time Citadel Broadcasting took control of ABC Radio (Citadel Media since April 2009 and Cumulus Media Networks since September 2011). "Timeless" ended February 15, 2010.

The station's satellite position was taken by The Christmas Channel, a seasonal channel. Unforgettable Favorites was, prior to the merger, switched over to Christmas music during the holiday season each year until Cumulus Media's merger of CMN and Westwood One in 2014.
