= WAUR (AM) =

- Somonauk, Illinois; United States
- Broadcast area: Kendall County, Illinois
- Frequency: 1550 kHz

Programming
- Format: Country

Ownership
- Owner: Nelson Multimedia Inc.; (Grundy County Broadcasters, Inc.)
- Sister stations: WCSJ-FM; WJDK-FM

History
- First air date: 1964
- Former call signs: WCSJ (1963–2022)

Technical information
- Licensing authority: FCC
- Facility ID: 17039
- Class: D
- Power: 380 watts day; 6 watts night
- Transmitter coordinates: 41°20′27.72″N 88°25′30.25″W
- Translator: 99.1 W256EC (Oswego)

Links
- Public license information: Public file; LMS

WAUR (1550 kHz) is an AM radio station licensed to Somonauk, Illinois. The station is owned and operated by Nelson Multimedia Inc., and currently airs a country music format, which is a simulcast of 1480 WDYS, also now licensed to Somonauk. Additional programming includes local news, high school sports, a weekly fishing and outdoor program, and NASCAR racing.

The studios are located on Washington Street in downtown Morris, the station's original community of license. Previous studio locations include above the old downtown Hornsby's Five and Dime store on Liberty St. In 1977, the studios moved to the 3rd floor of the Baum Building and later to the Business and Technology Center on North Rt. 47 in Morris. WAUR's current sister station is WJDK-FM 95.7 with studios in the same building and a transmitter located between Kinsman and Seneca, Illinois.

Prior to adopting its previous classic hits programming, the then-WCSJ had carried Timeless network programming from Citadel Broadcasting until the network's shutdown in February 2010.
