= WKCA =

- Salt Lick, Kentucky; United States
- Broadcast area: Morehead, Kentucky
- Frequency: 97.7 MHz
- Branding: "Real Country"

Programming
- Format: Country
- Affiliations: NBC News Radio

Ownership
- Owner: Gateway Radio Works, Inc.

History
- Former call signs: WURD-FM (1981–1986); WURD (1986–1987); WAXZ (1987–2007)

Technical information
- Licensing authority: FCC
- Facility ID: 56222
- Class: A
- ERP: 3,000 watts
- HAAT: 143 meters (469 ft)
- Transmitter coordinates: 38°10′33″N 83°24′28″W

Links
- Public license information: Public file; LMS
- Website: www.wkcaradio.com

WKCA (97.7 FM) is a radio station licensed to serve Salt Lick, Kentucky, United States. The station is owned by Gateway Radio Works, Inc.

WKCA broadcasts a country music format to the greater Morehead, Kentucky, area.

The station was assigned the WKCA call sign by the Federal Communications Commission on October 1, 2007.

== 2005-2007: Max FM ==
As WAXZ-FM, the station operated from Georgetown, Ohio. From 2005 to 2007 it simulcast WOXY-FM (97.7 FM) and WAOL-FM (99.5 FM) featuring the MAX FM format, which is an adult hits format without disc jockeys, similar in style to the syndicated Jack FM brand.

Before merging into "MAX FM," WAXZ played country music as "The Rooster"; WOXY-FM, which also broadcast at 97.7 MHz, was known shortly as "X-97.7," a modern rock station from Oxford, Ohio; and WAOL-FM was known as "Classic Country 99.5," broadcasting from Ripley. In Spring 2005, all three stations were rebranded "MAX FM."
