= WKYN =

- Mount Sterling, Kentucky; United States
- Broadcast area: Mount Sterling; Winchester; Owingsville; Morehead
- Frequency: 107.7 MHz
- Branding: K107

Programming
- Format: Classic Country
- Affiliations: NBC News Radio

Ownership
- Owner: Gateway Radio Works, Inc.

History
- First air date: 1983 (as WKCA)
- Former call signs: WGGI (1983–1983); WKCA (1983–2007)

Technical information
- Licensing authority: FCC
- Facility ID: 23345
- Class: A
- ERP: 6,000 watts
- HAAT: 100 meters
- Transmitter coordinates: 38°06′08″N 83°50′12″W

Links
- Public license information: Public file; LMS
- Website: wkynradio.com

WKYN (107.7 FM) is a radio station broadcasting a classic country format. Licensed to Mount Sterling, Kentucky, the station serves the area of East-Central Kentucky between Lexington and Morehead. The station is currently owned by Gateway Radio Works, Inc.

== History ==
The station went on the air as WGGI on 1983-01-12. on 1983-04-27, the station changed its call sign to WKCA, on 2007-10-01 to the current WKYN, Call sign WKYN earlier pertained to the San Juan, Puerto Rico, station in the Caribbean-area's English-language Quality Broadcasting System chain. QBS included stations in US Virgin Islands and Ponce, PR. Alfredo Ramírez de Arellano was owner; Art Merrill, station manager; Troy W. Fields and later Nancy Frazer, sales managers; Bob Bennett, programming director. Its format was American music, divided into type by time slot. Sally Jessy (Raphael) had a morning talk show Monday through Friday.
