= Cumulus Media Networks =

American radio network (1945–2013)

- Type: Radio network
- Country: United States

Ownership
- Owner: ABC, Inc. (1945–1953); American Broadcasting-Paramount Theatres; (1953–1965); American Broadcasting Companies, Inc.; (1965–1986); Capital Cities/ABC; (1986–1996); The Walt Disney Company; (1996–2007); Citadel Broadcasting; (2007–2011); Cumulus Media (2011–2013)

History
- Launch date: June 15, 1945 (80 years ago)
- Replaced: Blue Network
- Closed: December 12, 2013; (68 years, 180 days)
- Replaced by: Westwood One
- Former names: ABC Radio (1945–2009); Citadel Media (2009–2011)

Coverage
- Availability: National, through regional affiliates

Cumulus Media Networks was an American radio network owned and operated by Cumulus Media. From 2011 until its merger with Westwood One, it controlled many of the radio assets formerly belonging to the American Broadcasting Company (ABC), which was broken up in 2007; Cumulus owned the portion of the network that was purchased by Citadel Broadcasting that year.

The network adopted its final name in September 2011, following Cumulus's acquisition of Citadel; prior to this, it had been known as Citadel Media Networks since April 2009, after licensing the "ABC Radio Networks" name from The Walt Disney Company for nearly two years. ABC now operates ABC Audio which produces mostly short-form audio content for radio stations.

As ABC Radio Networks, it was the penultimate of the original major radio networks to still be owned by its original founding company, CBS Radio being the last. The Mutual Broadcasting System and the NBC Radio Network were both dissolved in 1999 after both were sold to the original Westwood One a decade earlier.

== History ==
Cumulus Media Networks had its origins in an early network set up by WJZ (now WABC) in New York City which provided programs to other stations over Western Union lines.

=== NBC Blue Network ===
WJZ radio, originally owned by Westinghouse and its informal network were absorbed into the National Broadcasting Company in 1927. To the parent company Radio Corporation of America (RCA), WJZ and affiliates were known as the Blue Network while New York station WEAF and its affiliates (also absorbed into NBC) were known as the "Red Network". On the air, both were identified as "NBC, the National Broadcasting Company." The distinctions between the two networks were, beyond staff and advertisers, mostly a matter of the more popular and established programming appearing on NBC Red.

Both NBC networks were owned by RCA; following a Federal Communications Commission investigation into the network's influence over advertising, strict ownership rules were introduced in 1941. RCA was compelled to sell one network and three local stations.

=== ABC Radio ===
Former ABC Radio Networks Logo used until 2009

RCA put an asking price of $8 million on the Blue network; after two years on the market, it was sold in 1943 to businessman Edward J. Noble, owner of Life Savers candy and the Rexall store chain, for the asking price. After Noble took over, the network identified itself on-air as "The Blue Network". It was officially renamed American Broadcasting Companies, Inc., in June 1945, after the company bought the rights to the name from (what would later become) Storer Broadcasting.

With about 65 affiliates, ABC began with few of the big names and popular shows the other networks offered, so counter-programming became an ABC specialty. Industry policy had been to forbid taped or pre-recorded programs; ABC lured some big-name stars by adapting the tape technology developed in World War II. To add to its programming, ABC bought stations KECA (now KABC) in Los Angeles and WXYZ (now WXYT) in Detroit, the latter home and originator of many popular serials such as The Lone Ranger.

Financially unable to match the larger networks NBC and CBS, ABC merged with United Paramount Theaters early in 1953. Through the 1950s, network radio declined in popularity, and ABC radio gradually became more oriented to its local stations, especially its two pop-music powerhouses, New York's WABC (formerly WJZ) and Chicago's WLS (which was owned and operated by the Prairie Farmer in a time-share arrangement with ABC-owned WENR until both stations merged in 1954; ABC acquired the Farmer's minority stake in 1959).

Some network shows survived the transition to television: Don McNeill's Breakfast Club, one of the country's first and longest-running morning programs, aired from 1933 to 1968 with Don McNeill as the host. Other long-running ABC programs included the National Barn Dance, running from 1924 to 1960, and Paul Harvey's daily commentary, which ran from 1951 until his death in 2009.

In 1958, ABC collaborated with its sister television network to produce the first national stereophonic sound broadcasts, when it simulcast The Plymouth Show (one of two shows hosted by Lawrence Welk at the time); the TV side broadcast one audio channel and the radio side broadcast the other in synchronization; viewers had to tune into both devices to achieve the stereophonic effect.

==== John F. Kennedy assassination bulletin ====
ABC Radio broadcast the first nationwide report of the assassination of President John F. Kennedy. Kennedy was shot in a motorcade in Dallas, Texas, at 18:30 UTC on November 22, 1963, and ABC Radio's Don Gardiner anchored the network's initial bulletin at 18:36:50 UTC, minutes before any other radio or television network did the same.

A surviving aircheck from New York shortwave station WRUL includes the first ABC Radio bulletin. Gardiner interrupts Doris Day's recording of "Hooray for Hollywood" to tell listeners at 13:36:50 EST (UTC−5):

We interrupt this program to bring you a special bulletin from ABC Radio. Here is a special bulletin from Dallas, Texas: three shots were fired at President Kennedy's motorcade today in downtown Dallas, Texas. This is ABC Radio. To repeat: in Dallas, Texas, three shots were fired at President Kennedy's motorcade today. The president now making a two-day speaking tour of Texas. We're going to stand by for more details on the incident in Dallas. Stay tuned to your ABC station for further details. Now we return you to your regular program.

==== ABC Radio Networks ====
Network	News aired	Ad/minute $	Launched	Ended
American Entertainment Network; (originally to be called; American Personality Network)	:30	$1,250	January 1, 1968	
American Information Network	varies	$1,500	January 1, 1968	
American Contemporary Network	:50-:60	$2,500	January 1, 1968	
American FM Network	:15-:20	$650	January 1, 1968	
ABC Rock Radio Network	:45	N/A	January 4, 1982	
ABC Direction Radio Network	:45	N/A	January 4, 1982	
ABC Talk Radio			1982	1989
ESPN Radio			January 1, 1992	
Radio Disney			November 18, 1996	April 14, 2021
Urban Advantage Network (UAN)			January 1, 2001	

Ralph Beaudin, group vice president of ABC Radio, came up with the idea of splitting the ABC Radio Network into four different networks. He felt that there was more product than stations could broadcast, causing a sale issue. The four separate networks would allow advertisers to better market to their preferred audience. Paul Harvey and the Breakfast Club were designated as Entertainment network features. Before the split, ABC obtained a waiver of the FCC's "Chain Broadcasting" rule on December 29, 1967, which had forced the sale of the Blue network in 1943.

Though each of the four new networks was carried on the same 5 kHz telco line (3.5 in some cities), the move allowed ABC to have as many as four affiliates in one city, a major competitive advantage and a dramatic turning point in the history of network radio. However, the FCC insisted that there be no overlap of any ABC network broadcast in a single market, and the network required affiliates to get approval before any delayed broadcast of network programming. The new networks were launched on January 1, 1968.

Two additional networks, ABC Rock Network and ABC Direction Network, were added on January 4, 1982. ABC Rock's anchor affiliate was WPLJ in New York City, and many album-oriented rock-formatted stations moved from the American FM Network, with a total of 40 affiliates. Executives in charge of ABC Rock at the launch were vice president Tom Plant and program director Denise Oliver. The Direction Network was under ABC Entertainment Network's executive's charge, was for adult (25–45) format stations, and started with 57 affiliates.

ABC Radio acquired Watermark Inc., best known as the syndicator of American Top 40 with Casey Kasem and American Country Countdown with Bob Kingsley, in 1982. Kasem left ABC in 1988, reclaiming the American Top 40 name from ABC in 1998, and selling the AT40 brand to AMFM Radio Networks (later absorbed into Premiere Networks). Kingsley left ABC in 2005, and 'ACC' continues to air as part of the ABC stable, with Kix Brooks as host since 2006. Dick Bartley joined the network in 1991 with the AT40 spinoff American Gold and his live Saturday night call-in oldies show, before leaving at the end of March 2009.

ABC launched a foray into talk radio with ABC Talkradio (similar to rival NBC's Talknet) in 1982. Among its most notable hosts were Michael Jackson, Owen Spann, Toni Grant and Ray Briem. In 1987, an adjunctive network internally known as "ABC Radio Talk" was launched to wrest some programming control away from local ABC station KABC in Los Angeles. Tom Snyder and Barry Farber were featured on this secondary network, following a notable three-hour guest appearance by Snyder on Ray Briem's program. However, the rising popularity of conservative talk radio, fueled by The Rush Limbaugh Show, led to the main network's demise. Limbaugh had been picked to replace Owen Spann on the main ABC Talkradio network after Spann was forced to retire due to medical issues. This occurred when former ABC executive Ed McLaughlin purchased Spann's former weekday slot with the idea of giving Limbaugh a national platform following his initial success on KFBK in Sacramento.

After Tom Snyder's retirement in 1992, ABC ostensibly filled his weeknight slot with Leslie Marshall, at the time the youngest syndicated host ever, while most major affiliates instead picked up Limbaugh. ABC's national talk programming efforts ended shortly thereafter, though one program from the original Talkradio/Weekend network, Bob Brinker's Moneytalk, remained on the air until 2018.

ABC acquired the Satellite Music Network, the first satellite-delivered music radio network, and its nine channels of programming in 1989. The division continues to operate semi-autonomously as Cumulus Music Radio at Cumulus's Dallas-Fort Worth cluster.

ESPN Radio Network was formed in September 1991 by both ESPN Inc. and Capital Cities/ABC, Inc.'s ABC Radio Networks and launched as Sports Radio ESPN on January 1, 1992. Radio Disney was test-launched on November 18, 1996, in four markets by ABC Radio Networks, with a Los Angeles station added on August 26, 1997.

The ABCRadio.com logo used on 22 ABC O&O stations' Web sites before merger with Citadel Broadcasting

ABC again began building a talk network, this time with an emphasis on political talk, in 2001. Among the first hosts heard on the new ABC talk network were Sam Donaldson of ABC News television, Sean Hannity of WABC, Larry Elder of KABC, and John Batchelor of WABC. Donaldson left his show after a short time. Mark Levin was added in 2005 and eventually replaced Elder in 2007, and Mark Davis of WBAP had a brief syndication run on the network in 2005. Rush Limbaugh's program was not part of this network; following a series of mergers in the 1990s, Ed McLaughlin's company, EFM, was absorbed into Premiere Networks, a subsidiary of Clear Channel Communications (now iHeartMedia).

Hannity has been the most successful, displacing Laura Schlessinger as the most popular host in the time slot within a few years (especially on the East Coast); the network shared the program with Premiere Radio Networks from 2008 to 2013 before Premiere took over the program entirely beginning in 2014.

==== Sale to Citadel ====
In 2005, ABC began to explore the sale of its radio division. The two leading competitors for the purchase of the network, which included 22 of ABC Radio's top stations, as well as ABC's talk and music networks, were Bala Cynwyd-based Entercom Communications and Forstmann Little & Company's Citadel Broadcasting unit. Citadel was chosen as the top bidder and the deal to purchase the stations and the network was struck in February 2006.

The deal did not include Radio Disney, ESPN Radio (or its Spanish counterpart, ESPN Deportes Radio), any of the five ESPN Radio stations (or the myriad of Radio Disney stations) Disney owned at the time, or any of ABC's television assets (the ABC name, which also remained in Disney's hands, would be licensed to Citadel for two years). Disney's ABC News unit will also still produce ABC News Radio programming for distribution by Citadel. Despite the change in ownership, Citadel Media still listed "ESPN Radio" & "ESPN Deportes" as part of its advertising sales family.

The acquisition of ABC Radio by Citadel Broadcasting was officially completed on June 12, 2007 and the "ABC Radio Networks" logo was licensed from Disney until April 2, 2009.

Shortly after the announcement of the ABC/Citadel merger, the "FM" network was reactivated. It now provides an hourly, two-minute newscast, similar in format to when the network formerly operated. Those newscasts carry the on-air brand "ABC News Now".

=== Citadel Media ===
Logo as Citadel Media, used from April 2009 through September 2011

On April 2, 2009, the staff at Citadel Broadcasting changed the branding of this network from ABC Radio to "Citadel Media" to reflect its current ownership of a major radio network. However, "ABC News"; and its programming/satellite format listings would remain.

=== Cumulus Media ===
Cumulus Media absorbed all the assets of Citadel Broadcasting, including Citadel Media in September 2011, and the name change to "Cumulus Media Networks" immediately took effect upon acquisition. Previously, Citadel turned down previous acquisition offers months after emerging from bankruptcy.

On August 29, 2013, Cumulus Broadcasting purchased Dial Global (Westwood One as of September 4). Cumulus paid $260 million in cash for this programming syndication service, part of which has paid off Dial's debt before it was folded into this network service. Cumulus funded the sale by making a pair of station deals with Townsquare Media.

On July 31, 2014, Cumulus acquired the rights to CNN's content to distribute to radio stations (the company had held CNN radio rights since its acquisition of Dial Global, but CNN had not produced any radio content since April 2012). The newly acquired Westwood One network would distribute the content, allowing stations to use it with their branding. As an example, Cumulus stated that its "Nash"-branded country stations would run the content under the "Nash News" name. The programming deal started on January 1, 2015, when its broadcasting rights to ABC's news division expired. ABC relaunched an entirely new ABC Radio network (known as ABC Audio as of 2019). ABC Audio renewed its affiliation with most of the Cumulus stations in 2020 when Westwood One made the decision to fold its news division.

The merger of Cumulus Media Networks into Westwood One was completed in mid-2015.

== Programming ==
=== Satellite formats ===
In 1989, ABC Radio Networks acquired the Satellite Music Network which originally started in Chicago. Full-time music formats operated by ABC Radio, Citadel Media and Cumulus Media include the following:

- Best Country Today
- Classic Rock
- Good Time Oldies
- Hits & Favorites
- Jack FM
- Real Country
- Rejoice! Musical Soul Food
- The Nerve
- The Rhythm
- The Touch
- Timeless
- Today's Best Hits
- The Christmas Channel
- The True Oldies Channel
- Unforgettable Favorites
- Z Rock

=== Former networks ===
- ABC News & Talk
- ABC News Now
- CBS Sports Radio
- ESPN Radio
- ESPN Deportes Radio
- Radio Disney
