= Adirondack Red Wings =

Defunct American Hockey League team

- City: Glens Falls, New York
- League: American Hockey League
- Operated: 1979–1999
- Home arena: Glens Falls Civic Center
- Colors: Red, white
- Affiliates: Detroit Red Wings

Franchise history
- 1971–1972: Tidewater Wings
- 1972–1975: Virginia Wings
- 1979–1999: Adirondack Red Wings
- 2002–2020: San Antonio Rampage
- 2020–present: Henderson Silver Knights

Championships
- Division titles: 3 (1985–86, 1988–89, 1993–94)
- Calder Cups: 4 (1980–81, 1985–86, 1988–89, 1991–92)

The Adirondack Red Wings were a minor professional ice hockey team in the American Hockey League. They played in Glens Falls, New York, United States at the Glens Falls Civic Center. The team was affiliated with the Detroit Red Wings of the National Hockey League.

== History ==
Desirous of promoting a winning atmosphere, Detroit ensured that the Adirondack Red Wings would have, for a minor league franchise, an unusually stable, veteran-laden roster. Veterans such as Glenn Merkosky, Jody Gage, Greg Joly, Norm Maracle and Dennis Polonich bolstered a team that saw over thirty players have 200 or more games with the franchise, including nine with over 300 and two (Merkosky and Joly) with over 400. In consequence, the Red Wings missed the playoffs only once in their twenty-year history. They played for the Calder Cup four times, winning each time.

The Red Wings' uniforms were identical to the parent club, with the white jersey featuring the distinctive red sleeves that the Detroit franchise has worn since 1956. During their final two seasons, the Adirondack Red Wings also wore a third jersey, based on Detroit's throwback design from 1991–92, replacing the word "DETROIT" on the front of the jersey with the winged wheel logo.

The Red Wings prospered as Detroit's top affiliate. However, by the late 1990s, the parent club wanted to move the affiliation closer to Detroit in order to ease movement of players between the minors and the NHL. Glens Falls was over 650 miles from Detroit. In early 1999, the Detroit Red Wings announced plans to move the team to Rossford, Ohio—a Toledo suburb—for the 2000–01 season. The Red Wings later suspended the franchise's operations following the 1998–99 season. As part of the agreement to relocate the franchise, the city of Rossford was to build a $48 million entertainment complex that included a 12,000-seat arena. However, the arena deal fell apart in late 2000. The franchise remained dormant until 2002, when it was purchased by the ownership of the National Basketball Association's San Antonio Spurs and resurrected as the San Antonio Rampage. In the same year, the Red Wings finally got an in-market AHL affiliate in the Grand Rapids Griffins.

The franchise was replaced by:

- Adirondack IceHawks/Frostbite of the UHL (1999–2006).
- Adirondack Phantoms of the AHL (2009–2014).
- Adirondack Flames of the AHL (2014–2015).
- Adirondack Thunder of the ECHL (2015–present).

== Coaches ==
- Bill Purcell 1979–1980
- Wayne Maxner 1980–1981
- Doug McKay 1981–1982
- Bill Mahoney 1982–1983
- Bill Dineen 1983–1989
- Barry Melrose 1989–1992
- Newell Brown 1992–1997
- Glenn Merkosky 1997–1999

== General managers ==
- Ned Harkness 1979–1982
- Jim Devellano 1982–1985
- Neil Smith 1985–1989
- Bill Dineen 1989–1990
- Barry Melrose 1990–1992
- Doug MacLean 1992–1994
- Ken Holland 1995–1997
- Don Waddell 1997–1999

== Season-by-season results ==
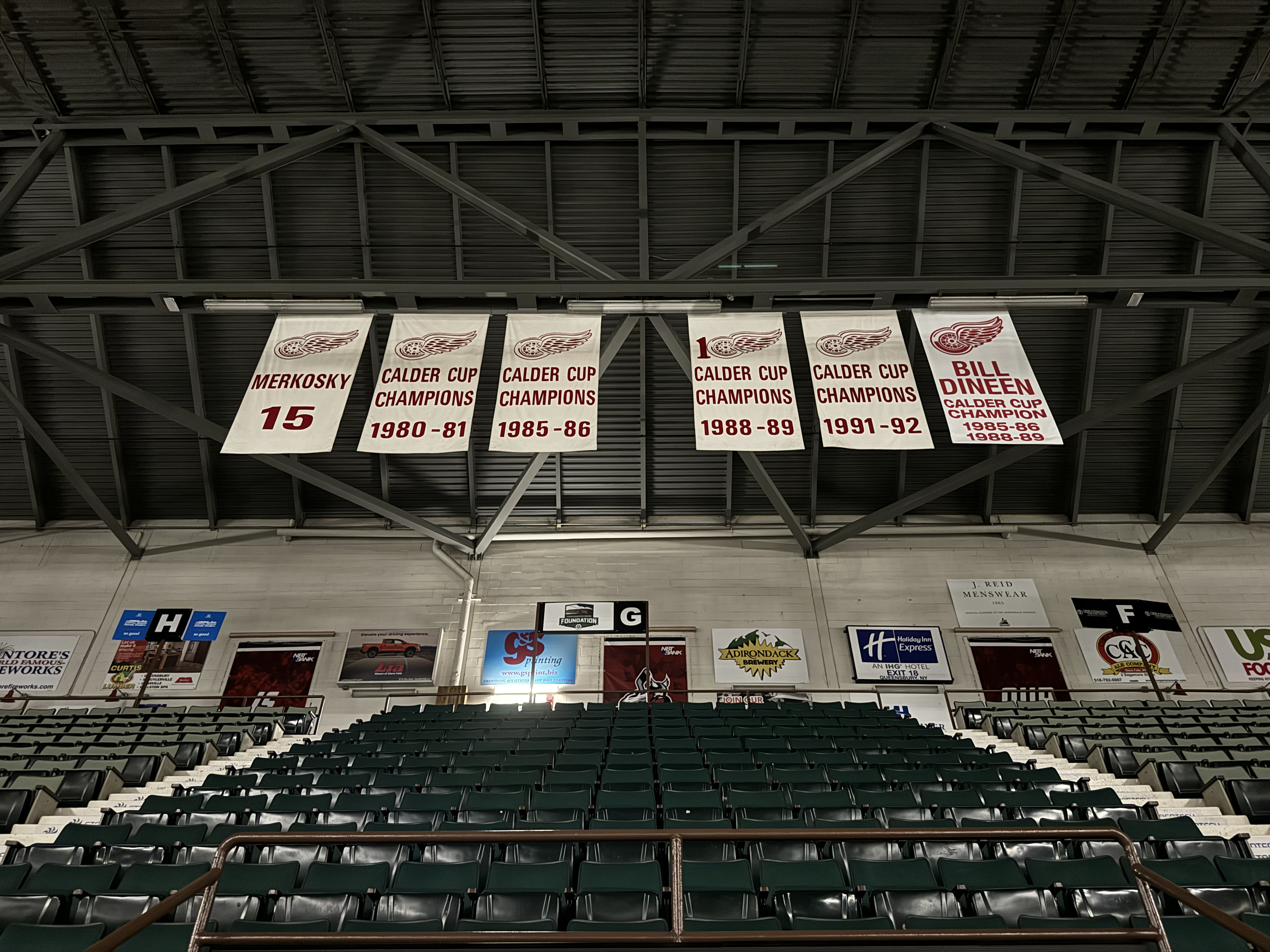
Adirondack Red Wings rafter banners hang at the Cool Insuring Arena in 2024

- Tidewater Wings 1971–1972
- Virginia Wings 1972–1975
- Adirondack Red Wings 1979–1999

=== Regular season ===
Season	Games	Won	Lost	Tied	OTL	Points	Goals for	Goals against	Standing
1971–72	76	22	45	9	—	53	197	275	6th, West
1972–73	76	38	22	16	—	92	258	221	3rd, West
1973–74	76	22	44	10	—	54	216	307	6th, South
1974–75	75	31	31	13	—	75	254	250	1st, South
1979–80	80	32	37	11	—	75	297	309	4th, North
1980–81	80	35	40	5	—	75	305	328	2nd, South
1981–82	80	34	37	9	—	77	299	285	5th, South
1982–83	80	36	39	5	—	77	329	343	4th, North
1983–84	80	37	29	14	—	88	344	330	2nd, North
1984–85	80	35	37	8	—	78	290	336	5th, North
1985–86	80	41	31	8	—	90	339	298	1st, North
1986–87	80	44	31	—	5	93	329	296	2nd, North
1987–88	80	42	23	11	4	99	306	275	3rd, South
1988–89	80	47	27	6	—	100	369	294	1st, South
1989–90	80	42	27	11	—	95	330	304	2nd, South
1990–91	80	33	37	10	—	76	320	346	5th, South
1991–92	80	40	36	4	—	84	335	309	2nd, North
1992–93	80	36	35	9	—	81	331	308	2nd, North
1993–94	80	45	27	8	—	98	333	273	1st, North
1994–95	80	32	38	10	—	74	271	294	4th, North
1995–96	80	38	32	8	2	86	271	247	2nd, Central
1996–97	80	38	28	12	2	90	258	249	2nd, Empire State
1997–98	80	31	37	9	3	74	245	275	4th, Empire State
1998–99	80	21	48	8	3	53	184	280	4th, Empire State

=== Playoffs ===
Season	1st round	2nd round	3rd round	Finals
1971–72	Out of Playoffs			
1972–73	W, 4-3, Hershey	L, 2-4, Cincinnati	—	—
1973–74	Out of Playoffs			
1974–75	L, 1-4, New Haven	—	—	—
1979–80	L, 1-4, New Brunswick	—	—	—
1980–81	W, 4-2, Binghamton	W, 4-2, Hershey	—	W, 4-2, Maine
1981–82	L, 2-3, New Brunswick	—	—	—
1982–83	L, 2-4, Fredericton	—	—	—
1983–84	L, 3-4, Maine	—	—	—
1984–85	Out of Playoffs			
1985–86	W, 4-2, Fredericton	W, 4-1, Moncton	—	W, 4-2, Hershey
1986–87	W, 4-2, Moncton	L, 1-4, Sherbrooke	—	—
1987–88	W, 4-3, Rochester	L, 0-4, Hershey	—	—
1988–89	W, 4-1, Newmarket	W, 4-3, Hershey	—	W, 4-1, New Haven
1989–90	L, 2-4, Baltimore	—	—	—
1990–91	L, 4-13, Hershey ^{†}	—	—	—
1991–92	W, 4-1, New Haven	W, 4-0, Springfield	W, 2-1, Rochester	W, 4-3, St. John's
1992–93	W, 4-0, Capital District	L, 3-4, Springfield	—	—
1993–94	W, 4-2, Springfield	L, 2-4, Portland	—	—
1994–95	L, 0-4, Albany	—	—	—
1995–96	L, 0-3, Rochester	—	—	—
1996–97	L, 1-3, Albany	—	—	—
1997–98	L, 0-3, Albany	—	—	—
1998–99	L, 0-3, Rochester	—	—	—

^{†} Two game combined total goals series in preliminary round.

== Notable alumni ==
- Allan Bester
- Bob Boughner
- Shawn Burr
- Tim Cheveldae
- Steve Chiasson
- Jim Cummins
- Mathieu Dandenault
- Dallas Drake
- Kris Draper
- Murray Eaves
- Darren Eliot
- Brent Fedyk
- Tim Friday
- Jody Gage
- Gerard Gallant
- Adam Graves
- Glen Hanlon
- Dave Hanson
- Shane Hnidy
- Ken Holland
- Tomas Holmstrom
- Doug Houda
- Greg Johnson
- Sheldon Kennedy
- Petr Klima
- Mike Knuble
- Joe Kocur
- Vyacheslav Kozlov
- Gord Kruppke
- Pavel Kubina
- Maxim Kuznetsov
- Mark Laforest
- Martin Lapointe
- Pete Mahovlich
- Norm Maracle
- Darren McCarty
- Randy McKay
- Barry Melrose
- Glenn Merkosky
- Joe Murphy
- Ted Nolan
- Lee Norwood
- Adam Oates
- John Ogrodnick
- Chris Osgood
- Dennis Polonich
- Keith Primeau
- Bob Probert
- Jamie Pushor
- Yves Racine
- Jim Rutherford
- Brad Smith
- Mike Sillinger
- Greg Stefan
- Sam St. Laurent
- Tim Taylor
- Wes Walz
- Aaron Ward
- Jason York
- Marc Potvin

=== American Hockey League Hall of Famers ===
AHL Hall of Fame Honored Members
Name	Seasons	Induction Year
Bruce Boudreau	1991-92 (player)	2009
Bill Dineen	1983-89 (head coach)	2014
Murray Eaves	1987-90, 1994-95 (player); 1995-98 (asst. coach)	2019
Jody Gage	1979-85 (player)	2006
Glenn Merkosky	1985-91 (player); 1991-92 (asst. coach); 1996-99 (head coach)	2018

== Team records ==
Career goals: Glenn Merkosky: 204
Career assists: Glenn Merkosky: 212
Career points: Glenn Merkosky: 416
Career penalty minutes: Gord Kruppke: 1,028
Career games: Glenn Merkosky: 430

=== Former affiliates (6 stations) ===
- WROW/590: Albany
- WZZM-FM/93.5: Corinth
- WENU/101.7: Hudson Falls
- WVKZ/1240: Schenectady
- WSTL/1410: South Glens Falls
- WKBE/100.5: Warrensburg
