= New York Mets Radio Network =

Sports radio network

The New York Mets Radio Network, referred to on air as Audacy Mets Radio, is a radio network owned by Audacy, Inc. (previously CBS Radio) that broadcasts New York Mets baseball games. It consists of one station - WHSQ 880 AM. A Spanish-language broadcast airs separately from the English-language network.

== History ==
The network's English-language flagship is WHSQ 880 AM, which is owned by Audacy but licensed to Good Karma Brands to operate as an affiliate of ESPN Radio. WHSQ inherited the radio broadcast rights to the Mets from WCBS (AM), its predecessor, and is operating under a contract signed with Audacy predecessor Entercom that began in 2018 and is scheduled to run until 2025. The Mets had previously aired their games on WFAN beginning in 1987, when the station signed on at 1050 AM a replacement for WHN; WHN had been the radio home of the Mets from 1983 on. The Mets would eventually move with WFAN down the dial to 660 AM in 1988 and would remain there for over two decades.

After WFAN signed on to be the flagship for the New York Yankees beginning in 2013, the Mets moved their broadcasts to a new flagship, WOR. The Mets were the first professional sports team in a decade to call the station home, after the New Jersey Nets left for WFAN in 2004.

On April 1, 2019, Entercom announced that it had discontinued the Mets' radio network and would be carrying games only on WCBS for the 2019 season. The Mets cited the loss of some of its affiliates prior to the season (among them WROW in Albany) and the relative expense of satellite space for the discontinuation. At least one station, WTLA in Syracuse (the city that houses the Mets' AAA affiliate), expressed objection to the cancellation, as that station had an affiliation deal that ran through 2020 and will not be honored. WHSQ, a maximum-power clear-channel station that can be received in most of the Eastern United States at night, now exclusively airs all games.

=== Streaming (2022-present) ===
On March 31, 2022, the Mets announced that the WCBS stream on the Audacy app would stream Mets games in full to make up for the radio network's shortfall throughout the Mets' home territory, and also be made available on the team's website under the same restriction. The team and Audacy will also produce and stream the team's Spanish-language broadcast, which will return to WEPN after a one-year interregnum on TelevisaUnivision's WQBU-FM (a sale of that station to a religious broadcaster required a move in rights over the offseason).

Good Karma Brands began operating WCBS as WHSQ on August 26, 2024, under a local marketing agreement with Audacy, with the station carrying ESPN Radio as a replacement for WEPN-FM. Good Karma holds no relationship to the Mets or its radio network, as Audacy remains the official rights holder, and is responsible for the advertising time during Mets broadcasts. Likewise, the stream for Mets games remains on the Audacy app under the "Mets Radio" branding, with Westwood One Sports programming streamed at all other times.

Since 2026, the fifth inning has been "the Newsday Fifth", with Mets beat writers joining the booth. Laura Albanese, one of the Mets writers, called a series of games alongside Keith Raad between August 4-6.

== Broadcasters ==
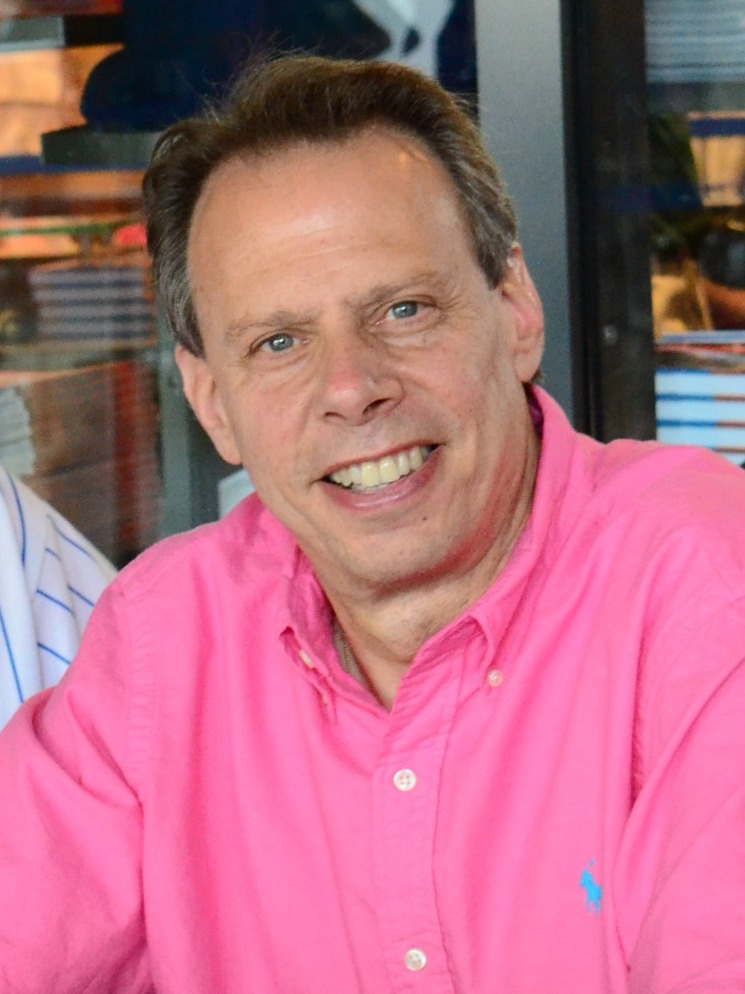
Howie Rose has served as broadcaster since 1995.

Howie Rose serves as play-by-play and color commentator on the broadcasts, alternating these roles with another broadcaster. For the period from 2012 to 2018, Rose's partner was Josh Lewin. Wayne Randazzo, who had hosted pre- and post-game broadcasts, replaced Lewin in 2019. Ed Coleman previously hosted the pre-game and post-game shows, which were called Mets Extra by WFAN, and served as a substitute broadcaster when necessary (usually for Lewin, who, in addition to his Mets duties, was the radio voice of the San Diego Chargers and was forced to miss weekend games in September in order to fulfill those duties). However, in January 2014 it was announced that Coleman would not be part of the WOR broadcasts as he has been employed by WFAN since its inception. (Although WFAN personalities Chris Carlin and Marc Malusis have been heard on WOR through its broadcasts of Rutgers University sporting events, WOR does not produce Rutgers' games and is instead an affiliate of its radio network.) Coleman returned to the Mets' booth as pre-game host in 2019. In 2023, after Randazzo left to do television play-by-play for the Los Angeles Angels, his role was filled by Keith Raad.

== Flagships (2 stations) ==
- 880/WHSQ & 101.1 HD2 WCBS-FM: New York City (2019–)
- 92.3 HD2/WINS-FM: New York City (2024–, Spanish language)

== Former flagships (18 stations) ==
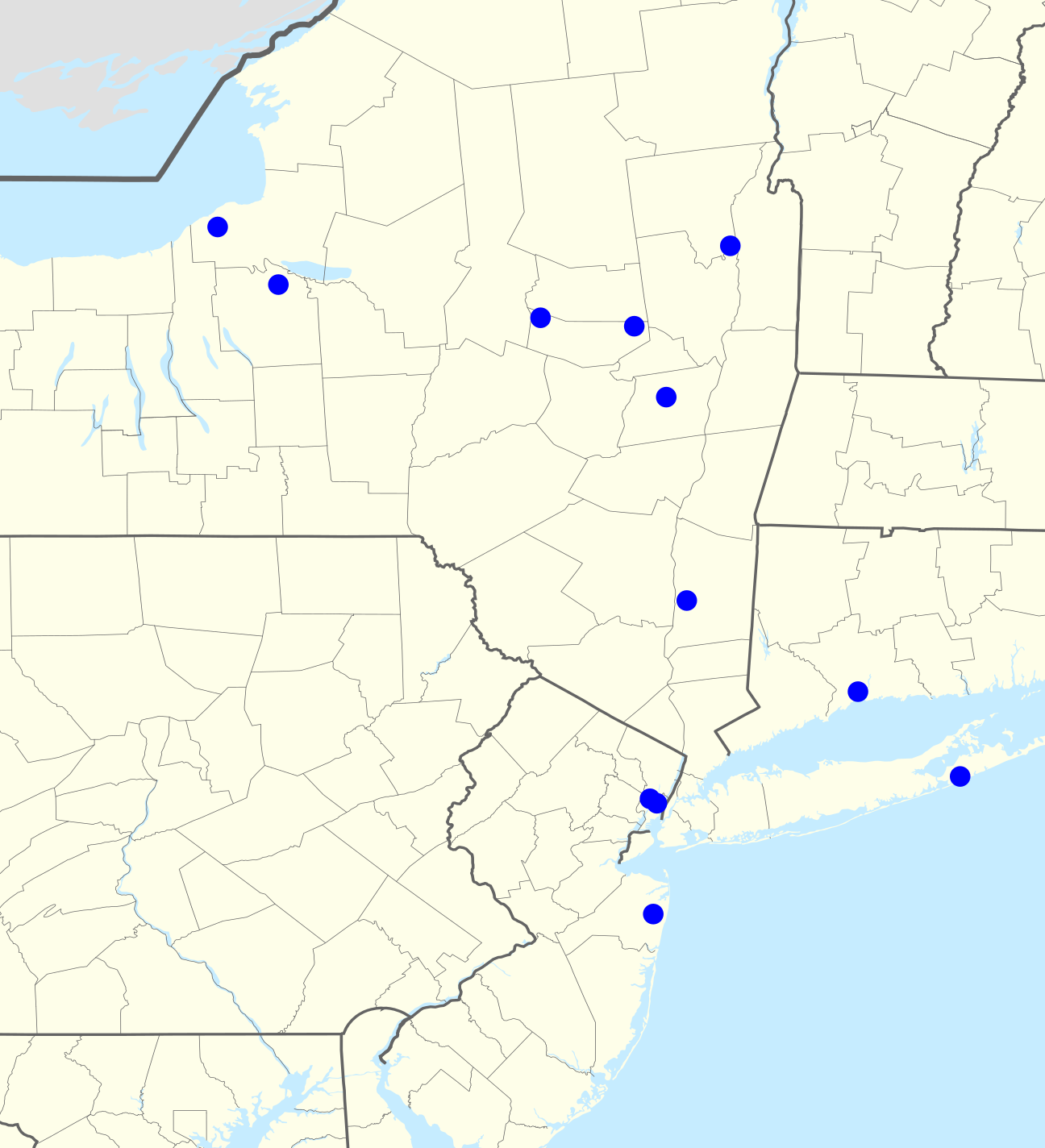
Map of radio affiliates in 2016

- 570/WMCA: New York City (1978–1982)
- 620/WSKQ: Jersey City, New Jersey (1990–1996)
- 660/WFAN: New York City (1988–2013)
- 710/WOR: New York City (2014–2018)
- 770/WABC: New York City (1962 & 1963)
- 970/WJRZ: Hackensack (1967–1971)
- 1050/WHN: New York City (1964–1966, 1972-1974, 1983-1987)
- 1050/WFAN: New York City (1987–1988)
- 1050/WEPN: New York City (2013–2020, 2022-2023)
- 1130/WNEW: New York City (1975–1977)
- 1280/WADO: New York City (1997–2009)
- 1380/WBNX: New York City (1982-August 31, 1984)
- 1380/WKDM: New York City (September 1, 1984-1986)
- 1480/WHOM: New York City (1962–1974)
- 1480/WJIT: New York City (1987–1989)
- 92.7/WQBU-FM: Garden City, New York (Spanish flagship) (2010–2012, 2021)
- 101.9/WFAN-FM: New York City (2013)
- VENE International Network (1975–1981)

== Former affiliates (19 stations + 2 translators) ==
- 590/WROW: Albany, New York (2018)
- 800/WLAD: Danbury, Connecticut (-2018)
- 810/WGY: Schenectady, New York
- 900/WKAJ: Saratoga Springs, New York
- 980/WOFX: Troy, New York (-2011)
- 1120/WKAJ: Oneonta, New York (-2018)
- 1200/WTLA: North Syracuse, New York (-2018)
- 1230/WMML: Glens Falls, New York
- 1300/WAVZ: New Haven, Connecticut (-2018)
- 1310/WSGO: Oswego, New York
- 1400/WABY: Albany, New York
- 1450/WKIP: Poughkeepsie, New York
- 1460/WOKO: Albany, New York
- 1490/WCSS: Amsterdam, New York (-2018)
- 1540/WPTR: Albany, New York
- 1590/WPSL: Port St Lucie, Florida (1988-2025)
- 94.1/W231DJ: Danbury (translator for WLAD)
- 96.9/W245BA: Manorville (translator for WLIR-FM)
- 102.5/WBAZ: Watermill, Long Island (-2018)
- 104.9/WINU: Altamont, New York (2016–2017)
- 104.9/WSRD: Johnstown, New York
- 107.1/WLIR-FM: Hampton Bays, New York (was supposed to be an affiliate in 2014, however its format reverted to religion.)

== See also ==
- List of XM Satellite Radio channels
- List of Sirius Satellite Radio stations
- List of New York Mets broadcasters
