= WPTR =

WPTR may refer to:

- WPTR (AM), a radio station (1240 AM) licensed to serve Schenectady, New York, United States
- WMHH (96.7 MHz), which held the WPTR from 2004 to 2011
- WAJZ (96.3 MHz), which held the WPTR calls from 1996 to 1999
- WDCD (AM) (1540 kHz), longtime holder of the WPTR calls from 1948 to 1995 and again from 2000 to 2004
