= WKBE =

Simulcasting WKLI-FM Albany
- Corinth, New York; United States
- Broadcast area: Glens Falls; Saratoga Springs
- Frequency: 107.1 MHz
- Branding: 100.9/107.1 The Cat

Programming
- Format: Country
- Affiliations: Compass Media Networks

Ownership
- Owner: Pamal Broadcasting; (6 Johnson Road Licenses, Inc.)
- Sister stations: WFFG-FM; WENU; WMML; WNYQ

History
- First air date: June 1967 (as WXQL)
- Former call signs: WXQL (1967–1970); WBZA-FM (1970–1979); WNIQ (1979–1986); WAYI (1986–1993); WMJR (1993–1996); WHTR (1996–2001); WFFG-FM (2001–2014)
- Call sign meaning: Karamatt Broadcasting Enterprises (original owner of 100.3 MHz)

Technical information
- Licensing authority: FCC
- Facility ID: 49716
- Class: A
- ERP: 2,850 watts
- HAAT: 147 meters (482 ft)
- Transmitter coordinates: 43°14′40.3″N 73°46′16.4″W

Links
- Public license information: Public file; LMS
- Webcast: Listen live
- Website: www.thecatalbany.com

WKBE (107.1 FM) is a commercial radio station licensed to Corinth, New York, and serving Glens Falls and Saratoga Springs. It is owned by Pamal Broadcasting and broadcasts a country music radio format, simulcasting WKLI-FM (100.9) from Albany.

WKBE has an effective radiated power (ERP) of 2,850 watts. The transmitter is in Lake Luzerne, New York.

== History ==
In June 1967, the station signed on as a country music outlet WXQL-FM. Its original owner was Harry Barker, who already owned WBZA (1410 AM), a daytime-only station. The station was originally licensed to Glens Falls, New York, and was the region's first FM station, although other FM stations were already on the air in the Capital District. Both stations were later sold to Soundcasters, Inc.

In 1970, the call sign was changed to WBZA-FM. It simulcast the Top 40 programming of WBZA, but went back to country during the evening hours after WBZA's sunset sign off in those days, since 1410 was originally a daytimer. Eventually WBZA-FM completely separated its programming from WBZA, and became a beautiful music outlet in the mid-1970s. Throughout the rest of the 1970s, 1980s, and early 1990s, the station generally did a variation of what would now be considered hot adult contemporary.

After WBZA-FM, numerous call signs appeared on 107.1 including WNIQ from 1979 to 1986, WAYI from 1986 to 1993, and WMJR from 1993 to 1996. On July 1, it flipped to Top 40 as "WHTR Hot 107.1", licensed to Hudson Falls and owned by Bradmark Communications, owner of several other stations in the market. At its outset, the station had a locally run contemporary hits sound going against several out-of-market stations. WHTR's most famous alumni of this period was Joe Rosati, now better known as "Joey Kidd" of WHTZ (with stops at WFLY, WKKF, and WQSX along the way, who made his debut at the station.

Though WHTR did fairly well in the ratings and was able to sell many ads in the summer months when tourism in the area is high, Bradmark wanted a station that was more compatible with other stations in the cluster. In October 1997, WHTR's format was flipped from Top 40 to oldies under the new moniker Wheels 107.1. Though all satellite-fed programming, the station got a small but steady listener base. However its ratings were worse than that of Hot 107.1 and the revenues were only marginally better overall.

In 2000, Bradmark Communications was sold to Vox Media. Unlike Bradmark, Vox was committed to locally based radio and planned to take the oldies genre local until a construction permit was filed to move sister station WZZM-FM into the Albany market. At the start of 2001, the country format of WZZM-FM was moved to the 107.1 frequency, localized, and became WFFG with the "Froggy" branding popular in other markets throughout the Northeast. WHTR and its satellite-fed oldies format were moved to WZZM-FM's 93.5 MHz frequency and remained there until the station moved to the Albany market in April 2002 where it is today WYAI, an affiliate of the Air 1 network. With that move, WFFG's community of licence changed to Corinth to satisfy FCC community of license concerns.

The new format of the 107.1 frequency was a success of sorts from the outset. Ratings in both the Glens Falls area and in the Albany-Schenectady-Troy market where it resides increased with WFFG beating some in-market FM's in the latter and proving to be a threat to that market's powerhouse, WGNA-FM, outrating it in some key suburban towns in Saratoga County. This trend has held up through the several years the station has had a country format.

In 2004, Vox Media sold its Glens Falls cluster minus WNYQ (which itself would move into the Albany market in 2006) to Pamal Broadcasting. Pamal decided to celebrate the purchase, in some way, by giving WFFG an Albany market simulcast when that market's 104.9 WZMR began to simulcast WFFG in February 2005. Though Pamal had hoped that the simulcast would push WGNA down enough to make their WYJB #1 in the market, instead WFFG's Albany market numbers declined and in January 2006 WZMR flipped to active rock. WZMR would later revisit a country music format four years later, dumping its Edge format as 104.9 The Cat. In October 2013, the country format on WZMR moved to WKLI which was on both stations until December when WZMR began playing adult album alternative music as 104.9 The Peak.

On December 27, 2013, WFFG's sister station WKBE and its Modern AC/AAA format moved to the WFFG frequency becoming "107.1 The Point, Today's Modern Mix" with a similar sound to WZMR, and WKBE switched to a country music format as Froggy 100.3, swapping call signs in the process.

On January 6, 2016, WKBE changed its format back to top 40/CHR, still branded as "107.1 The Point", but under the slogan "Hit Music Now".

On August 10, 2020, WKBE changed its format from top 40/CHR to classic country, branded as "Big Country 107.1".

On March 9, 2023, the station began simulcasting the "Big" format on WMML (the former WBZA), and announced the format would move full-time to said station (which utilizes an FM simulcast on translator 97.9 W250CC). This led into a format change to a simulcast of WKBE's Albany sister station WKLI-FM as "100.9/107.1 The Cat" on March 21, 2023.
