= WDCD =

WDCD may refer to:

- WDCD (AM), a defunct radio station (1540 AM) formerly licensed to serve Albany, New York, United States
- WMHH, a radio station (96.7 FM) licensed to serve Clifton Park, New York, which held the call sign WDCD-FM from 2011 to 2019
