= WKAJ (disambiguation) =

WKAJ is a radio station (1120 AM) licensed to Saint Johnsville, New York.

WKAJ may also refer to:

- WABY, a radio station (900 AM) licensed to Watervliet, New York, which held the call sign WKAJ from 1964 to 1992, and again from 1996 to 1999
- WKKF, a radio station (102.3 FM) licensed to Ballston Spa, New York, which held the call sign WKAJ-FM from 1968 to 1979
- WKAJ, a radio station in Fargo, North Dakota which operated between August and November, 1922
