= WYVS =

Coordinates: 43°31′26.2″N 74°21′37.5″W

- Speculator, New York; United States
- Frequency: 96.5 MHz
- Branding: WYVS 96.5

Programming
- Format: Adult contemporary

Ownership
- Owner: Carol Whelley, Joseph Tesiero, and John Tesiero, III; (Cranesville Block Company)
- Sister stations: WCSS; WKAJ; WIZR

History
- First air date: 2012
- Call sign meaning: "Your Vacation Station"

Technical information
- Licensing authority: FCC
- Facility ID: 189565
- Class: A
- ERP: 2,600 watts
- HAAT: 152 meters (499 ft)

Links
- Public license information: Public file; LMS
- Website: wyvs965.com

WYVS (96.5 FM) is a radio station licensed to Speculator, New York. The station broadcasts an adult contemporary format and is owned by Carol Whelley, Joseph Tesiero, and John Tesiero, III, through licensee Cranesville Block Company.

In August 2024, it was announced that Mariano and Wilhelmina Simms’ Simms Broadcasting would acquire Cranesville Block Company’s four stations and four translators in Upstate New York for $600,000.
