= WIZR =

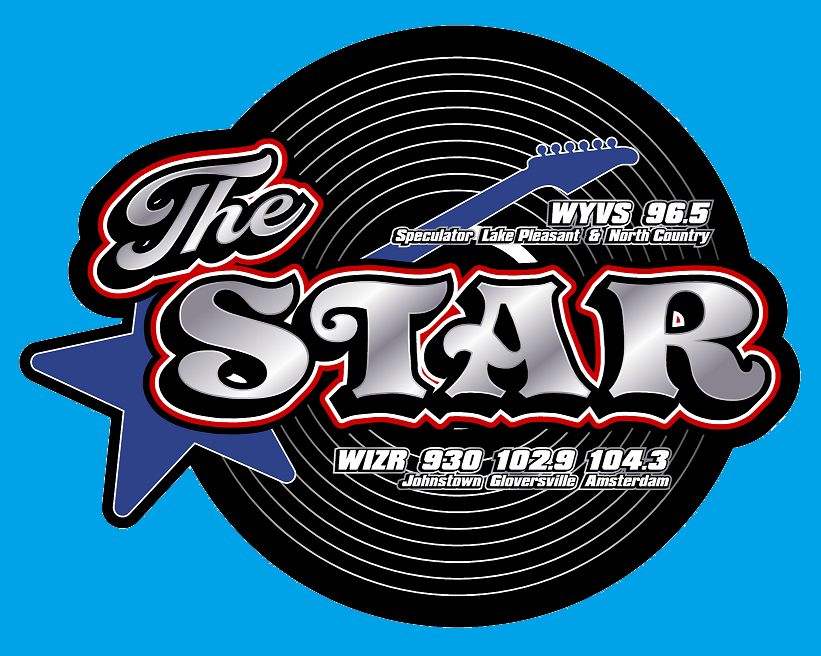
- Johnstown, New York; United States
- Broadcast area: Mohawk Valley
- Frequency: 930 kHz
- Branding: 102.9 FM and 930 AM WIZR The Star

Programming
- Format: Hot adult contemporary/variety
- Affiliations: Westwood One

Ownership
- Owner: John Tesiero, Jr.; (Cranesville Block Company, Inc.)
- Sister stations: WKAJ; WCSS; WYVS

History
- First air date: 1964
- Former call signs: WIZR (1964–1981); WMYL (1981–1984)

Technical information
- Licensing authority: FCC
- Facility ID: 27553
- Class: D
- Power: 1,000 watts day; 28 watts nights
- Transmitter coordinates: 42°59′59.1″N 74°21′25.2″W
- Translators: 102.9 W275BS (Johnstown); 104.3 W282CU (Northville)

Links
- Public license information: Public file; LMS
- Webcast: Listen live
- Website: wizr930am.com

WIZR (930 AM) is a radio station that broadcasts a hot adult contemporary format. Licensed to Johnstown, New York, United States, the station serves the Mohawk Valley area. The station is owned by the Cranesville Radio Network and features hit songs from the past five decades including songs from the 1970s until today. WIZR also plays a variety mix of pop music, R&B, rock, soft AC, classic hits and more.

By day, WIZR transmits with 1,000 watts, but to avoid interference with other stations on 930 AM, at night it reduces power to 28 watts. Programming is also heard on two FM translators, at 102.9 MHz in Johnstown and 104.3 MHz in Northville.

== History ==
WIZR signed on in 1964, airing a middle of the road format. Four years later, sister station WIZR-FM 104.9 signed on, simulcasting the AM station's programming. In 1973, the stations flipped to a top 40 simulcast, with the FM side flipping to oldies in 1980.

With the decline of top 40 formats on AM, WIZR switched to the syndicated "Music of Your Life" format under the call sign WMYL (in reference to the format) in 1981. WIZR-FM signed off in 1982 and returned after a one-year absence, simulcasting the AM's adult standards format. In 1984, Joe Caruso acquired the stations and reinstated the WIZR call sign on the AM side, while the FM took on a new format and the WSRD call letters.

In early 1998, Joe Caruso sought to move FM 104.9 closer to the Albany market by securing a construction permit to relocate WSRD to Altamont, New York. Later that year, Pamal Broadcasting acquired both stations for $2.2 million. Upon the closure of the sale, former sister station WSRD moved to its new transmitter site and is now WINU, while WIZR began to carry ABC's now-defunct Timeless radio network.

In December 2008, WIZR went silent as Pamal Broadcasting prepared for the sale of the radio station. Eventually, Dr. Thomas J. Kuettel purchased the station in early 2010. He installed a classic country format under Dial Global's True Country satellite service on March 15, 2010. On June 1, 2011, the station changed to Dial Global's oldies network. In March 2013, WIZR changed FM translator frequencies to 102.9, also adopting a new slogan, "Your Home For Classic Hits", as Dial Global had changed and updated the format.

In April 2014, the sale of WIZR began, with the Cranesville Radio Network of Amsterdam, New York, purchasing it. The station was flipped to an adult contemporary format, with a change to hot adult contemporary coming in July 2014. The license transfer for WIZR and W243CV was consummated on October 31, 2014, at a price of $150,000. WIZR became the fourth station in the Cranesville Amsterdam cluster, joining WCSS, WKAJ, and WYVS.

Undated, WIZR changed to its current hot adult contemporary format which includes hit songs from the past five decades (from the 1970s to present) with a variety mix of pop music, R&B, rock, soft AC, classic hits and more. The stations' current branding is WIZR 930 AM and 102.9 FM The Star of Johnstown. WYVS (96.5 FM) in Speculator, New York, is also included in WIZR's station identifications.

In August 2024, it was announced that Mariano and Wilhelmina Simms’ Simms Broadcasting would acquire Cranesville Block Company’s four stations and four translators in Upstate New York for $600,000.. The sale would never materialize. After one year of off and on talks and zero action, the sale would not occur.

== Former logos ==
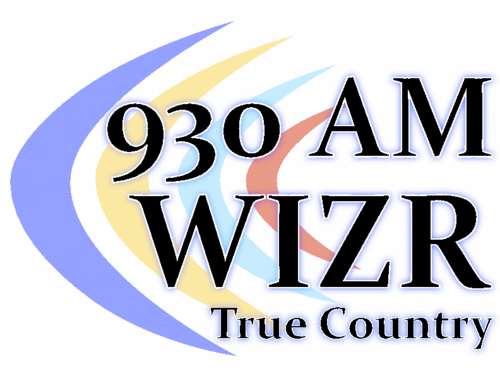
Former logo of the radio station used from early 2010 through June 1, 2011

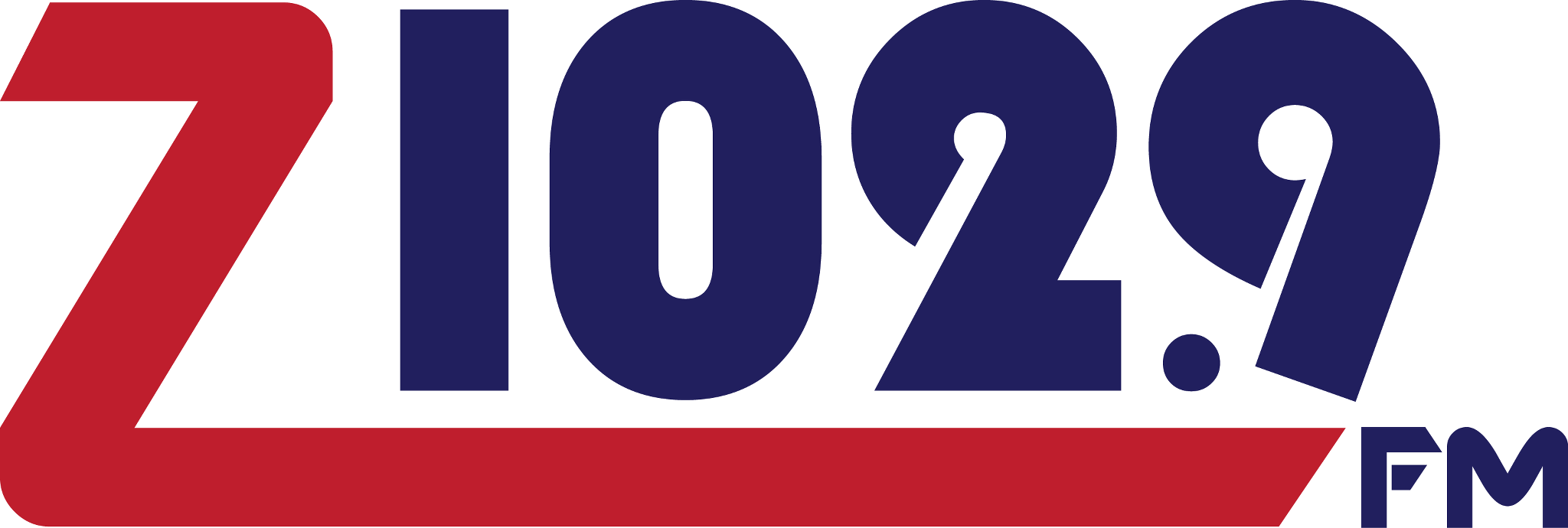
Former logo of W275BS 102.9 FM translator for WIZR circa. 2014

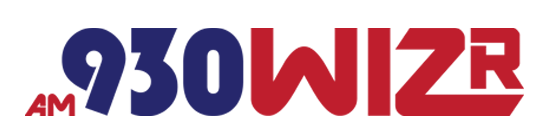
WIZR AM 930 former logo circa. 2014
