= WZMR =

WZMR may refer to:

- WZMR-LP, a low-power radio station (94.9 FM) licensed to serve East Boston, Massachusetts, United States
- WINU, a radio station (104.9 FM) licensed to serve Altamont, New York, United States, which held the call sign WZMR from 1999 to 2015
