= Kruppke =

Kruppke is a German surname. Notable people with the surname include:

- Dennis Kruppke (born 1980), German footballer
- Gord Kruppke (born 1969), Canadian ice hockey player
