= WMML =

- Glens Falls, New York; United States
- Broadcast area: Saratoga Springs, New York
- Frequency: 1230 kHz
- Branding: Big Country 104.9 & 97.9

Programming
- Format: Classic country
- Affiliations: Buffalo Bills Radio Network; New York Mets Radio Network

Ownership
- Owner: Pamal Broadcasting; (6 Johnson Road Licenses, Inc.)
- Sister stations: WENU; WFFG-FM; WKBE; WNYQ

History
- First air date: May 28, 1959
- Former call signs: WSET (1959–1965); WBZA (1965–1998)
- Former frequencies: 1410 kHz (1959–1982)

Technical information
- Licensing authority: FCC
- Facility ID: 49715
- Class: C
- Power: 1,000 watts
- Transmitter coordinates: 43°19′45.3″N 73°38′52.4″W
- Translator: 97.9 W250CC (Glens Falls)
- Repeater: 104.9 WINU (Altamont)

Links
- Public license information: Public file; LMS
- Webcast: Listen live
- Website: bigcountrylegends.com

WMML (1230 AM) is a radio station broadcasting a classic country format. Licensed to Glens Falls, New York, United States, the station serves the Glens Falls area. Established in 1959 as WSET, the station is owned by Pamal Broadcasting, through licensee 6 Johnson Road Licenses, Inc.

== History ==
What is now WMML began operations on May 28, 1959 as WSET, programming a middle of the road format; for a time, the station studios were located in the Queensbury Hotel in Glens Falls. In 1965, WSET changed its call sign to WBZA; the new call sign arose from the station owner's respect for WBZ in Boston. At the time, the station broadcast at 1410 AM with a "daytime only" license from the Federal Communications Commission (FCC). At sunset each day, the station would leave the air until the next day at 6 a.m. In 1971, the format was changed to Top 40. During the later 1970s, WBZA evolved to more of an adult contemporary format, and it eventually changed frequencies to 1230 in late 1982. WBZA flipped formats in 1986 to nostalgia, calling itself "Real Music". The WBZA call sign was transferred 1410 AM (which had returned to the air in 1988 under a new license as WSTL) in 1998; at that time, the station changed its call sign to WMML and took on a sports format.

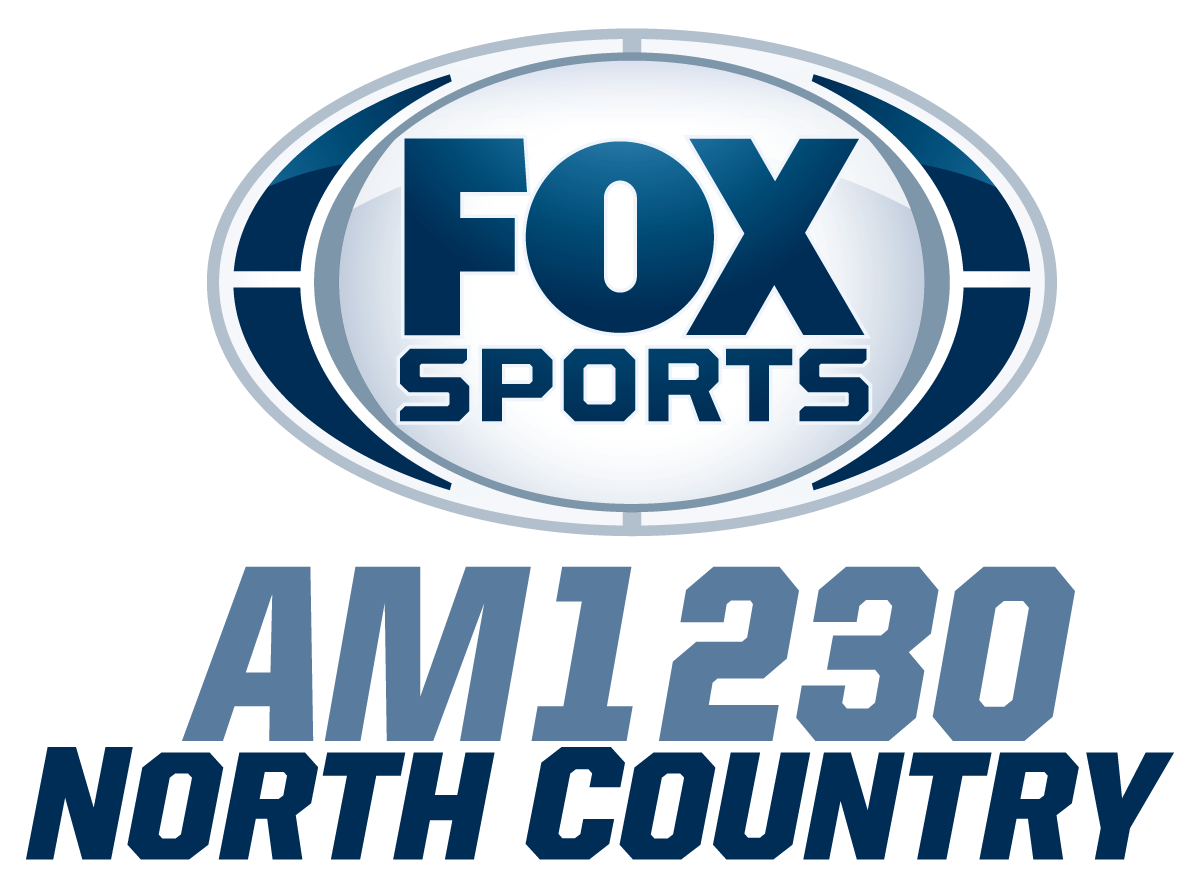
Logo before translator sign on

The station signed off the air in early 2012 to build a new antenna and returned to the air in March. It was announced, when the station signed back on March 15, that WMML would be joining the New York Mets Radio Network, covering all 162 games, replacing WOFX, who decided to switch to the Boston Red Sox Radio Network for the 2012 season.

On March 9, 2023, WMML/W250CC flipped to classic country, assuming the format and branding of WKBE, as "Big Country 97.9"; this was intended to make room for a new format to debut on WKBE. After weeks of broadcasting on both 107.1 and 97.9, WKLI-FM began simulcasting on WKBE as "100.9/107.1 The Cat" on March 21, 2023.

On September 18, 2023, WMML/W250CC began a simulcast on WINU 104.9 Altamont, rebranding as "Big Country 104.9 & 97.9".
