= WYAI (disambiguation) =

WYAI is or was the callsign of several different stations:

- WYAI, the current (2002–present) WYAI
- WRDG, the WYAI from 1994–2002
- WALR-FM, the WYAI from 1989–1994
