= WENU =

Satellite of WROW, Albany
- South Glens Falls, New York; United States
- Broadcast area: Glens Falls, New York
- Frequency: 1410 kHz
- Branding: Magic 96.9 and AM 1410

Programming
- Format: Soft oldies

Ownership
- Owner: Pamal Broadcasting; (6 Johnson Road Licenses, Inc.)
- Sister stations: WROW, WMML, WKBE, WNYQ, WFFG-FM

History
- First air date: September 1988 (as WSTL)
- Former call signs: WGFN (1982–1987); WSTL (1987–1998); WBZA (1998–2000)

Technical information
- Licensing authority: FCC
- Facility ID: 3157
- Class: D
- Power: 1,000 watts day; 103 watts night
- Transmitter coordinates: 43°19′45.26″N 73°38′52.42″W
- Translator: 96.9 W245DA (South Glens Falls)

Links
- Public license information: Public file; LMS
- Webcast: Listen live
- Website: www.albanymagic.com

WENU (1410 AM) is a radio station broadcasting a soft oldies format simulcasting WROW out of Albany. Licensed to South Glens Falls, New York, United States, the station serves the Glens Falls area. Established in 1988 as WSTL, the station is owned by Pamal Broadcasting.

== History ==
=== First usage of frequency in Glens Falls ===
The 1410 frequency went on the air as WSET in 1959, programming a middle of the road format; for a time, the station studios were located in the Queensbury Hotel in Glens Falls. In 1965, WSET changed its call letters to WBZA; the new call letters arose from the station owner's respect for WBZ in Boston. WSET and WBZA broadcast at 1410 AM with a "daytime only" license from the Federal Communications Commission (FCC). At sunset each day, the station would leave the air until the next day at 6am. In 1971, the format was flipped to Top 40. During the later 1970s, WBZA evolved to more of an adult contemporary format, and it eventually changed frequencies to 1230, in late 1982; that station is now WMML, a sister station to WENU.

=== Current station ===
From 1982 to 1988, the 1410 frequency previously occupied by WBZA was off the air, until returning as country music station WSTL in 1988. The station took on the WBZA call letters in early January 1998, and changed again in September 2000 to the current WENU.

During the early 2000s, WENU was a simulcast of WENU-FM, now WNYQ, with an adult standards format. When the FM changed to AC, WENU remained with adult standards. More recently, WENU flipped to a classic country format.

On January 30, 2012, WENU, along with sister station WMML, signed off the air, as the antenna in Queensbury, New York, was torn down to allow a new antenna to be put up in place. WENU returned to the air with a new nickname, "The U" on March 15, 2012, and a greater focus on community news coverage. WENU's new signal allows people in northern Warren County and southern Saratoga County to hear the station.

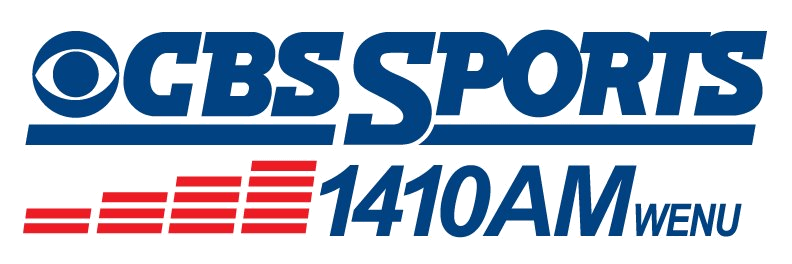
Logo as a CBS Sports Radio affiliate

WENU's classic country format came to an end on February 22, 2013; the following day, the station switched to a sports radio format supplied by CBS Sports Radio. On January 3, 2019, WENU dropped CBS Sports Radio and began simulcasting WROW, its sister station in Albany which carries a soft oldies format.

== Translator ==
Call sign	Frequency	City of license	FID	ERP (W)	Class	Transmitter coordinates	FCC info
W245DA	96.9 FM	South Glens Falls, New York	200832	250	D	43°19′44.8″N 73°38′52.4″W	LMS
