= WYAI =

Air 1 radio station in Scotia, New York

Coordinates: 42.857°N 74.067°W

- Scotia, New York; United States
- Broadcast area: Capital District
- Frequency: 93.7 MHz
- Branding: Air1

Programming
- Format: Christian worship
- Affiliations: Air1

Ownership
- Owner: Educational Media Foundation

History
- First air date: 1980 (in Corinth); April 22, 2002 (Scotia)
- Former call signs: WSCG (1980-91, Corinth); WZZM-FM (1991–2001, Corinth); WHTR (2001-02, Corinth); WHTR-FM (2002); WKRD (2002-04); WEGB (2004); WEGQ (2004-06); WOOB (2006-07)
- Former frequencies: 93.5 MHz (1980–2002, Corinth)
- Call sign meaning: W AlbanY Air I

Technical information
- Licensing authority: FCC
- Class: A
- ERP: 1,250 watts
- HAAT: 215 meters (705 ft)
- Translators: 104.3 W282BI (Coxsackie); 104.3 W282AD (East Windham)

Links
- Public license information: Public file; LMS
- Webcast: Listen Live
- Website: air1.com

WYAI (93.7 FM) is a listener-supported, non-commercial Christian worship radio station licensed to Scotia, New York, and serving the Capital District and Mohawk Valley. The station is owned by Educational Media Foundation and broadcasts at 1,250 watts effective radiated power from a location near Rotterdam Junction, New York. The station is an owned-and-operated station (O&O) of EMF's Air1 network.

== Corinth history ==
The history of WYAI dates back to December 1981, when 93.5 signed on in Corinth as country station WSCG. WSCG was a live 24-hour-a-day operation throughout the 1980s, that ran into financial difficulties in the early 1990s. In early 1991, WSCG left the air, returning under new ownership in the summer of 1991, as beautiful music station WZZM. WZZM encountered financial problems of its own by early 1993, and left the air itself. It returned to the air, during the summer of 1993, as an oldies station. It abruptly left the air again in March 1994. It returned to the air in May 1994, still doing oldies, but flipped to country two weeks later as Z-Country 93.

In the late 1990s, Bradmark Communications began studies for moving the station down to the Albany market and selling it at a profit. These plans were expanded when Bradmark sold the stations to Vox Media in 2000, which in March 2001, moved the oldies format of 107.1 WHTR to 93.5, and relaunched the Z-Country format as the locally-run WFFG (Froggy 107.1). Galaxy purchased the station in late 2001, and surprisingly retained the WHTR calls with the move, a rarity among move-in stations.

== Move into Scotia ==
WHTR moved into the Albany market from Corinth (when it was moved to 93.7 MHz to protect WZCR's signal) in 2002, signing on at 3:00 p.m. on April 22, 2001. The call letters initially remained WHTR at that time, and took on the Hot Talk 93.7 name with a hot talk format and simulcast on AM 1400 (the original WABY, now known as WAMC). The station's key personalities were former WPYX morning co-host John Mulrooney in morning drive and the syndicated Opie and Anthony show in afternoon drive; most weekend programming was a simulcast of K-Rock WKRL Syracuse, albeit with local ads. Within four months, Mulrooney was fired and the "Sex for Sam" incident ended Opie and Anthony's original syndication attempt.

Outside of drivetimes, the WKRL simulcasts on WHTR-FM were the highest rated programs on the station (impressive given the presence of two full-time stations, WHRL (now WGY-FM) and WQBK-FM (now WPBZ-FM), in the market). With a hole to quickly fill, on August 30, 2002, the station took on the WKRD calls and flipped to modern rock as K-Rock 93.7. The station became notable for hiring former WGY afternoon host JR Gach for mornings in January 2003 after being released from WGY. This format was simulcast on 1400 until Galaxy sold that station in April 2003.

However, on January 22, 2004, WKRD abruptly flipped to classic country as 93.7 The Eagle, taking on the WEGB calls, which were quickly switched to WEGQ to alleviate confusion with television station WRGB. For nearly two years, WEGQ played Dial Global satellite-fed classic country music from the 1960s to 1980s. The station had only one local personality under this format, former WYJB afternoon personality Chris Holmberg who left for Galaxy on the heels of WYJB's first #1 (12+) ratings book.

On January 4, 2006, after simulcasting the Eagle format on WRCZ (which was formerly 94 Rock) for about a week, the station relaunched as 93.7/94.5 The Bone, taking on the WOOB calls. The Bone had a mainstream rock format with the tagline Everything That Rocks, and featured J. R. Gach in mornings with co-host Pi and traffic gal Alecia.

On February 16, 2007, the Bone format ended anticlimactically right in the middle of the song "Ride the River" by Eric Clapton, when Galaxy Communications exited the Albany market and sold both stations to Educational Media Fund in a fire sale. WOOB was converted to an Air 1 O&O, broadcasting a Christian CHR format, and later changed its calls to WYAI several months later on July 6, 2007.
