= Keith Raad =

American sportscaster

- Born: April 21, 1993 (age 33); Valley Stream, New York, U.S.
- Occupation: Sportscaster
- Years active: 2015-present
- Known for: New York Mets radio announcer

Keith R. Raad (born April 21, 1993) is an American sportscaster who currently serves as a radio broadcaster for the New York Mets.

== Career ==
Raad began broadcasting for the Dayton Dragons, the Single-A affiliate of the Cincinnati Reds, in 2015. Later that year, he joined WPIE in Ithaca, New York. He served as a beat reporter for the Cornell University men's hockey team, and called play-by-play for their wrestling, ice hockey, and lacrosse matches. He had brief stints with the Long Island Ducks in the Atlantic League (2016) and the Texas Rangers Double-A affiliate Frisco RoughRiders (2017) as broadcaster, media relations person, social media manager, and blogger, which included serving as the media relations person for the 2017 Texas League All Star Game.

From 2017 to 2023, Raad called football, men's and women's basketball, and baseball for Wagner College, and he broadcast basketball and volleyball for University of Maryland Eastern Shore from October 2021 – 2023.

=== New York Mets ===
In May 2018 Raad was hired as the play-by-play broadcaster for the New York Mets High-A affiliate Brooklyn Cyclones. In this role, he broadcast games, hosted both pre- and post-game shows, and worked in communications for the team. In 2023 he was hired by Audacy to serve as a broadcaster for the New York Mets Radio Network alongside Howie Rose. As Rose has reduced his schedule in the 2020s following health issues, Raad has broadcast games with Pat McCarthy.

In addition to his radio duties, he conducts interviews and previews games on the team's television channel SportsNet New York (SNY).

== Awards ==
Raad received the 2019 Warner Fusselle Award for Radio Excellence from the New York-Penn League.

== Personal life ==
Raad married Kaitlyn Krause in October 2021 and they have one child.
