= Parks-Bentley House =

Historic house in New York, United States

- U.S. National Register of Historic Places
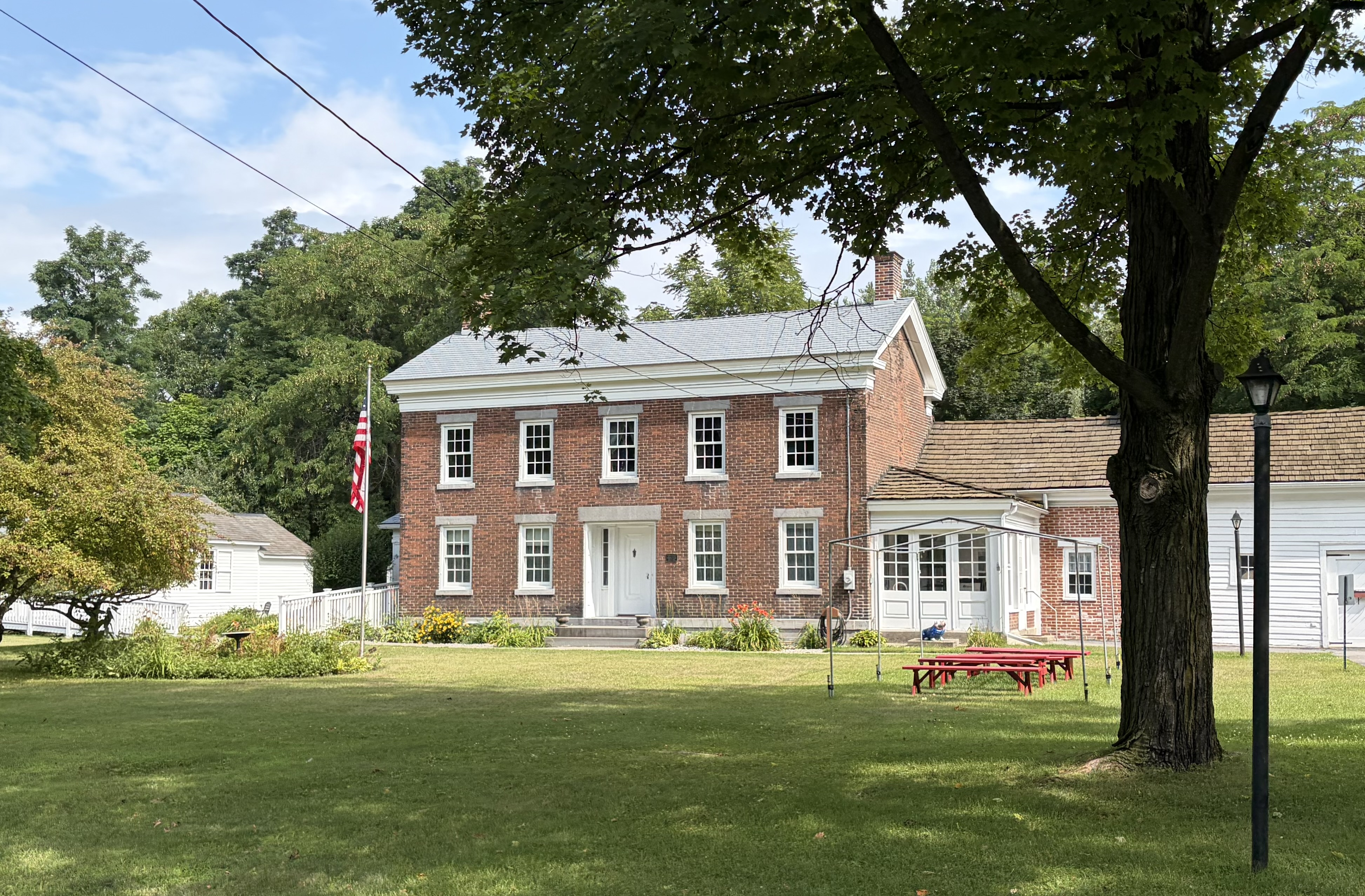
- The Parks-Bentley House in 2026

- Location within New York Location within the United States
- Location: 53 Ferry Blvd., South Glens Falls, New York
- Coordinates: 43°18′0″N 73°37′27″W
- Area: 1.1 acres (0.45 ha)
- Built: 1840
- Architect: Parke, Daniel, II; Benedict, Daniel
- Architectural style: Greek Revival, Colonial
- NRHP reference No.: 94000331
- Added to NRHP: April 21, 1994

Parks-Bentley Place, also known as Parke Farm or the Old Bentley Place, is a historic home located at South Glens Falls in northern Saratoga County, New York.

It "is one of the oldest historic structures in the area and is the only one that is open to the public. The original part of the current Parks-Bentley Place was built in 1776, with additions occurring circa 1830, 1840."

Its current form dates from around 1840 and is two-story, brick residence in the late Federal / early Greek Revival style. It sits on a hand-dressed limestone foundation and full basement. Attached to it is the original house—a late-18th-century, single-room, 1 1/2-story log cabin dwelling. The full property also includes a summer kitchen to the rear of the original structure; a one-room school house; and a "tool shed"—all open to the public during tour times. The house currently serves as headquarters for the Historical Society of Moreau and South Glens Falls.

The original house was built in 1766 by Daniel Parks, a veteran of the French and Indian War, on 900 acres (360 ha). In 1820 it was purchased by two brothers, Daniel and Sheldon Benedict, and in 1866 by Cornelius Bentley.

The property was added to the National Register of Historic Places in 1994.
