= Pamal Broadcasting =

American radio broadcasting company

Pamal Broadcasting, Ltd.
- Type: Privately held
- Industry: Radio broadcasting
- Founded: 1987 (as Albany Broadcasting)
- Headquarters: Latham, New York
- Key people: James J. Morrell, Chairman & CEO , John “JV” VanDenburgh, CFO
- Products: Radio
- Website: www.pamal.com

Pamal Broadcasting, Ltd. is a family-owned radio group with twenty-three stations in medium-to-small markets in the Northeast. Based in the Albany suburb of Latham, New York, Pamal Broadcasting was founded in 1987 as Albany Broadcasting Company, when business man James J. Morrell entered broadcast ownership with the purchase of WFLY and WPTR from Five States Tower Company, a Poughkeepsie, New York–based broadcasting company that also owned radio stations WPDH and WEOK in the mid-Hudson valley. The Pamal name, a portmanteau of the names of Morrell's children, was adopted in 1996 though each cluster uses a unique name (such as Albany Broadcasting for the Albany cluster; the Pamal name is rarely used on-air, except in the Hudson Valley).

In 2005, Pamal Broadcasting was the 27th-largest owner of radio stations in the United States. By mid-2011, the company has divested itself of 40% of its radio station licenses from its 2005 high-water mark. Pamal completed its exit from Florida in 2013.

In September 2026, Pamal announced the acquisition of Galaxy Media Partners and its cluster of stations in Central New York from its founder Ed Levine.

== Stations ==
AM Stations	FM Stations

Market	Station	Owned Since	Current Format
Albany – Schenectady – Troy, NY (Albany Broadcasting)	WYJB 95.5	1993	Adult contemporary
Albany – Schenectady – Troy, NY (Albany Broadcasting)	WKLI-FM 100.9	2001	New country
Albany – Schenectady – Troy, NY (Albany Broadcasting)	WFLY 92.3	1987	Contemporary hit radio
Albany – Schenectady – Troy, NY (Albany Broadcasting)	WINU 104.9	1999	Adult album alternative
Albany – Schenectady – Troy, NY (Albany Broadcasting)	WAJZ 96.3	1996	Rhythmic contemporary
Albany – Schenectady – Troy, NY (Albany Broadcasting)	WROW 590	1993	Oldies
Hudson Valley, NY (Pamal Broadcasting)	WXPK 107.1	2004	Adult album alternative
Hudson Valley, NY (Pamal Broadcasting)	WHUD 100.7	1996	Adult contemporary
Hudson Valley, NY (Pamal Broadcasting)	WBPM 92.9	2007	Classic hits
Hudson Valley, NY (Pamal Broadcasting)	WSPK 104.7	1997	Contemporary hit radio
Hudson Valley, NY (Pamal Broadcasting)	WBNR 1260	1997	Classic hits
Hudson Valley, NY (Pamal Broadcasting)	WGHQ 920	2007	Oldies
Hudson Valley, NY (Pamal Broadcasting)	WLNA 1420	1996	Classic hits
Saratoga Springs – Glens Falls, NY (Adirondack Broadcasting)	WNYQ 101.7	2004	Classic hits
Saratoga Springs – Glens Falls, NY (Adirondack Broadcasting)	WKBE 107.1	2004	New country
Saratoga Springs – Glens Falls, NY (Adirondack Broadcasting)	WFFG-FM 100.3	2001	Mainstream country
Saratoga Springs – Glens Falls, NY (Adirondack Broadcasting)	WENU 1410	2004	Oldies
Saratoga Springs – Glens Falls, NY (Adirondack Broadcasting)	WMML 1230	2004	Classic country
Rutland, VT (Catamount Radio)	WJJR 98.1	1999	Adult contemporary
Rutland, VT (Catamount Radio)	WDVT 94.5	1999	Classic rock
Rutland, VT (Catamount Radio)	WZRT 97.1	2007	Contemporary hit radio
Rutland, VT (Catamount Radio)	WJEN 105.3	2001	Mainstream country
Rutland, VT (Catamount Radio)	WSYB 1380	2007	Classic hits

== Former Pamal stations ==
- WDCD Albany, New York (owned under its original WPTR calls from 1987-1995 when sold to Crawford Broadcasting)
- WRNX Amherst, Massachusetts (owned 2003–2007, sold to Clear Channel Communications, in 2007)
- WVTQ Formerly WJAN Sunderland, Vermont, owned 1999–2006, sold to Vermont Public Radio in 2006
- WIZR Johnstown, New York, owned 1999–2010, sold to WIZR AM Radio, LLC in 2010
- WYNY Cross City, Florida, owned 2001–2007, sold to WGRO Radio, LLC in 2007
- WRGO Cedar Key, Florida, owned 2001–2007, sold to WGRO Radio, LLC in 2007
- WPYR Baton Rouge, Louisiana, owned 2006–2008, sold to Michael Glitner in 2008
- WDVH Gainesville, Florida, owned 2000–2011, sold to MARC Radio Gainesville, LLC July 2011
- WDVH-FM Trenton, Florida, owned 2000–2011, sold to MARC Radio Gainesville, LLC July 2011
- WHHZ Newberry, Florida, owned 2001–2011, sold to MARC Radio Gainesville, LLC July 2011
- WKZY Cross City, Florida, owned 2001–2011, sold to MARC Radio Gainesville, LLC July 2011
- WRZN Hernando, Florida, owned 1998–2011, sold to MARC Radio Gainesville, LLC July 2011
- WTMG Williston, Florida, owned 2001–2011, sold to MARC Radio Gainesville, LLC July 2011
- WTMN Gainesville, Florida, owned 2001–2011, sold to MARC Radio Gainesville, LLC July 2011
- WPNI Amherst, Massachusetts (owned 2003–2014; shut down November 30, 2013, and license returned to the Federal Communications Commission on May 27, 2014)
- WMEZ Pensacola, Florida, sold to Cumulus Broadcasting in January 2013
- WXBM Pensacola, Florida, sold to Cumulus Broadcasting in January 2013

Two stations were to be acquired by Pamal, though never purchased.

- WNYQ Queensbury, New York (controlled by Pamal 2004-2006 prior to move into the Albany market and purchase by Regent Communications who now operates it as WQBK-FM)
- WBEC-FM Pittsfield, Massachusetts (Pamal had an agreement in principle to move the station to the Springfield market, but later sold it to Entercom Communications which now operates it as WWEI).
