= WMHH =

Satellite of WMHR, Syracuse
- Clifton Park, New York; United States
- Broadcast area: Capital District
- Frequency: 96.7 MHz
- Branding: Mars Hill Network

Programming
- Format: Christian talk and teaching
- Network: Mars Hill Network

Ownership
- Owner: Mars Hill Broadcasting Company, Inc.

History
- First air date: March 1987 as WCSF
- Former call signs: WCSF (1987); WVKZ-FM (1987–1992); WWCP-FM (1992–1996); WXXO (1996); WDCD-FM (1996–2004); WPTR (2004–2011); WDCD-FM (2011–2019)
- Call sign meaning: "Mars Hill"

Technical information
- Licensing authority: FCC
- Facility ID: 30571
- Class: A
- ERP: 4,700 watts
- HAAT: 100 meters (330 ft)
- Transmitter coordinates: 42°52′44.3″N 73°51′45.4″W

Links
- Public license information: Public file; LMS

WMHH (96.7 MHz) is a Christian talk and teaching radio station licensed to Clifton Park, New York, and serving New York's Capital District, including Albany, Schenectady and Troy. The station is owned by Mars Hill Broadcasting, utilizing programming from the Mars Hill Network. It has an effective radiated power of 4,700 watts, and broadcasts from a rental tower in Clifton Park, New York, which is owned by Fitch Communications of New York (FCNY) and shared with WKKF and WTMM-FM.

The station has gone through numerous radio formats and call signs over the years, including the heritage WPTR call letters (previously on 1540 AM and 96.3 FM). The station has made three attempts at playing oldies, and was the first full-time contemporary Christian music station in the Capital Region. It was also the first station to broadcast in HD Radio in the market in 2005, preceding WGY by several months.

== History ==
In March 1987, the station signed on as WCSF, airing a Saratoga County-targeted oldies format, even though the signal covered the main cities of the Capital District well. WCSF's ownership later sold the station to WV Communications of Schenectady. WCSF-FM was the first oldies station on the FM dial in the Capital Region, and was moving up in the ratings when sold to WV.

WV Communications already owned WWWD, an AM station in Schenectady. In September 1987, WWWD and WCSF joined in a rock-based CHR simulcast, with WWWD becoming WVKZ and WCSF becoming WVKZ-FM. The two stations would later split off for most of the day, with 96.7 taking the "KZ-96.7" branding. KZ-96.7 shifted to album-oriented rock in 1989, and then to a harder current-based rock format in 1990, now known as "Power Rock KZ-96.7". In 1991, it returned to CHR as "Power Hits KZ-96.7".

Changes in Top 40 music as a genre, coupled with a glut of CHR stations in the Albany market, led ownership to change WVKZ-FM to a hot adult contemporary format in 1992 as WWCP-FM ("Capital 96-7"). Though set apart from several rival stations and a mild success, financial problems led to the sale of WVKZ to Capital OTB (the regional off-track betting agency) and that of WWCP-FM to Jarad Broadcasting, owners of Long Island station WDRE, a move done in part due to the large amount of Long Island expatriates and college students in the Albany area.

On Memorial Day weekend, 1994, several months after closing on WWCP-FM, Jarad Broadcasting launched the WDRE-based Underground Network, a progressive-leaning alternative rock format. Though a critical success in lieu of being a networked format, the format did not attain any ratings success, and on some occasions, nearly did not show in quarterly ratings. Making things even more difficult was the flip to alternative rock of WQBK-FM/WQBJ in 1995, as well as the consistent ratings of local hard rock Z-Rock affiliate WZRQ. These difficulties led Jarad to break from the network in late 1995, and flipped WWCP-FM to oldies as WXXO. With no FM oldies station in the market, the station entered the top 10 in its first book; however, this success would be short-lived as Jarad began to sell its non-Long Island holdings.

Early in 1996, Jarad found a buyer in WDCD owner Crawford Broadcasting, which took WXXO over that March and began a simulcast of WDCD's Christian talk format. That July, the calls changed to WDCD-FM; the format remained on the 96.7 frequency after WDCD split off and flipped to adult standards, reclaiming its heritage WPTR calls, at the start of 2000.

On March 16, 2004, WDCD and WPTR swapped formats and calls with 96.7 flipping to adult standards. This format served merely a placeholder, as on July 15 of that year, the station flipped to contemporary Christian, branded as Pulse 96-7. Increased competition from the K-LOVE (AC) and Air 1 networks led the station flipping back to classic hits, as "Legends 96.7" (a branding the station previously used during its adult standards incarnation) on February 1, 2011, at midnight, duplicating that of sister station WLGZ-FM in Rochester, New York.

Former logo of Legends 96.7, 2011

However, the "Legends" format was short-lived as the station returned to Christian talk, once again simulcasting AM 1540 on November 11, 2011, and changed to the WDCD-FM call letters; the simulcast branded as "New Light 96.7", emphasizing the FM frequency.

Effective July 25, 2019, the station was sold to Mars Hill Broadcasting for $600,000, and switched to Mars Hill Network programming. The station simultaneously changed its call letters to WMHH.
