= WINU =

WMML simulcast
- Altamont, New York; United States
- Broadcast area: Capital District
- Frequency: 104.9 MHz
- Branding: Big Country 104.9 & 97.9

Programming
- Format: Classic country

Ownership
- Owner: Pamal Broadcasting; (6 Johnson Road Licenses, Inc.)
- Sister stations: WAJZ; WFLY; WKLI-FM; WROW; WYJB

History
- First air date: June 26, 1968
- Former call signs: WIZR-FM (1968–1984); WSRD (1984–1999); WAAP (1999); WZMR (1999–2015)
- Call sign meaning: "Win" (former format)

Technical information
- Licensing authority: FCC
- Facility ID: 27551
- Class: A
- ERP: 530 watts
- HAAT: 284 meters (932 ft)
- Transmitter coordinates: 42°38′11.3″N 74°0′0.5″W

Links
- Public license information: Public file; LMS
- Webcast: Listen live
- Website: www.bigcountrylegends.com

WINU (104.9 FM, "Big Country 104.9 & 97.9") is a commercial radio station licensed to Altamont and serving New York's Capital District. The station is owned by Pamal Broadcasting and airs a classic country radio format.

WINU has an effective radiated power (ERP) of 530 watts. The transmitter is on Pinnacle Road in the Helderberg Escarpment tower farm in New Scotland, amid the towers for other Albany-area TV and FM stations. The programming is a simulcast of co-owned WMML 1230 AM in Glens Falls and on its FM translator on 97.9 MHz.

== Station history ==
=== WIZR-FM Johnstown ===
WINU is one of several signals to have moved into the Albany market in recent years. Prior to its relocation in March 1999, it was licensed to Johnstown, New York, as the sister station to WIZR (930 AM). It first signed on the air on June 26, 1968, as WIZR-FM. At first, it was a simulcast of its AM companion. In 1980, it began broadcasting a live and local oldies format. That lasted until the station went dark in 1982.

It returned to the air in 1983 once again simulcasting WIZR. In early 1984, it got its own call sign as WSRD ("The Wizard") as it switched to a short-lived live and local album rock format. It flipped to a satellite-delivered adult contemporary format in late 1984, and eventually to satellite delivered oldies in 1987. The oldies format remained in place until early 1999.

In early 1998, longtime WIZR/WSRD owner Joe Caruso obtained a Federal Communications Commission (FCC) construction permit to move WZMR to the Albany suburb of Altamont. That put it in the Albany-Schenectady-Troy radio market, making the station more valuable. In October 1998, Caruso sold the stations to Albany Broadcasting (today's Pamal Broadcasting) for $2.2 million. Albany Broadcasting closed on the stations in March 1999 and quickly moved WSRD into its studios.

=== Moving to Albany ===
The new call sign for the station was WAAP. The transmitter site was initially on the Channel 23 tower with sister station WAJZ, but was later moved to the WYJB tower in November 2000. The format was changed to modern adult contemporary as The Point when it began broadcasting from its new transmitter, on March 10, 1999.

The switch to Modern AC was an attempt to capitalize on the then-recent flips of WXLE (now WTMM-FM) to rhythmic oldies, WRVE to a more mainstream format, and the then-stunting WKLI. It was WKLI which spoiled these plans, as Albany Broadcasting was sued by CBS Radio, then-owners of the Point name, on the behalf of WKLI-owner-in-waiting Tele-Media. In response, the station relaunched as WZMR with the Z104.9 branding and a modern rock format. The Point name surfaced on WKLI (which changed to WCPT) that May. However, the ratings were not what Albany Broadcasting had hoped for.

=== Smooth jazz ===
On October 2, 1999, WHRL (now WGY-FM) switched from smooth jazz to modern rock, Albany Broadcasting took advantage of the format hole. Within two weeks, WZMR flipped to smooth jazz at 6:00 a.m. on October 18, 1999, as "Smooth Jazz 104.9." The final song played under WZMR's short-lived modern rock format was "You Get What You Give" by The New Radicals, also the first song played under the format. Though the return of smooth jazz was initially a success, ratings had declined at the station by early 2003.

In June 2003, the format was tweaked to urban adult contemporary (as a complement to then-urban WAJZ). WZMR added R&B and soul music to the smooth jazz playlist, with the branding 104.9 Love FM. However, the new format failed to attract listeners as well as advertising revenue, and the station was up for sale in 2004 to prepare WNYQ (105.7 FM) for a move-in. However, Regent Communications would eventually buy that station after the sale to Pamal fell through, and Pamal instead retained WZMR.

=== Country and active rock ===
Former WZMR logo under the Edge format, 2006-2010

After playing Christmas music in December 2004, the format was again changed on January 6, 2005, to a simulcast of country music station WFFG-FM in Corinth, New York.

Former WZMR logo as 104.9 The Cat, 2010–2013

After a weekend of stunting, WZMR flipped formats to active rock on February 13, 2006, as 104.9 The Edge, picking up the format abandoned by the former Edge, 103.9 WQBK-FM and 103.5 WQBJ in December 2005. WZMR saw the most success during this time, with the station's Edgefest concerts, and brought in John Mulrooney for its morning show. However, with WQBK-FM and WQBJ reverting to their previous active rock format in 2008, and WHRL tweaking from modern rock to active rock one year later, the future of WZMR's active rock format was cloudy. However, by the end of 2010, only WQBK-FM and WQBJ remained with the active rock format in the Albany market.

At 10:49 a.m. on February 26, 2010, the final song under the Edge format, "Cat Scratch Fever" by Ted Nugent, was anticlimactically interrupted, as WZMR returned to a country music format under the 104.9 The Cat branding, taking on a similar playlist and imaging to co-owned WJEN in Vermont. The first song played under the new country format was "Building Bridges" by Brooks & Dunn.

=== Adult alternative and sports ===
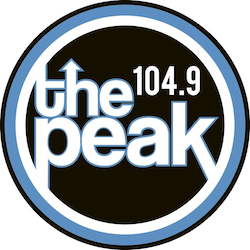
Logo used for WINU as 104.9 The Peak, the same logo Pamal Broadcasting uses for co-owned WXPK 107.1 The Peak in White Plains, NY

At midnight on October 10, 2013, WZMR began simulcasting on sister station WKLI-FM. The simulcast lasted until December 13, when, for 24 hours, WZMR began stunting with sound effects of a man hiking. WZMR launched an adult album alternative format at midnight on December 14, branded as "104.9 The Peak." The first song on "The Peak" was Stairway to Heaven by Led Zeppelin. The "Peak" name is also used by co-owned WXPK in the northern suburbs of New York City.

At Midnight on January 12, 2015, after playing "Be My Wife" by David Bowie, WZMR flipped to sports talk under new call sign WINU and the "Win 104.9" moniker. The station was silent for four minutes after DJ John Clark signed off until 12 a.m., when it went straight to CBS Sports Radio with the hourly "Sports Flash" update. The station utilized programming from CBS Sports, picking up that affiliation from AM 1240 WPTR. The move gave Albany its fourth sports station joining WPTR, which has shifted to NBC Sports Radio, WOFX (Fox Sports Radio) and WTMM (ESPN Radio). From 2015 to 2017, WINU aired New England Patriots football games and New York Mets baseball. Even after WINU's sports format ended, the station retained Patriots broadcasts for the 2018 season along with co-owned WROW; however, the Patriots did not return for the 2019 season.

=== Alt 104.9 ===
On March 16, 2018, at 5 p.m., WINU returned to an alternative rock format after nineteen years, this time branded as "Alt 104.9." This was likely a preemptive strike, as Townsquare Media's WQSH (now WQBK-FM) changed their website domain name to Alt1057Albany.com. This move by Pamal could have potentially made Townsquare find a new format, or new branding for the station. However, on March 1st 2018, Townsquare's "Remix 105.7" rebranded to "Alt 105.7", making it the second Alt branded station in the Capital District, and the 3rd station (at the time) with an alternative format in the Albany-Schenectady-Troy radio market, the 3rd one being WEQX, which has a rimshot signal to Albany but is considered a part of the Albany-Schenectady-Troy radio market by Nielson Media.

=== Big Country 104.9 & 97.9 ===
On September 18, 2023, at 5 p.m., after playing "Live in the Moment" by Portugal. The Man, WINU began simulcasting Glen Falls sister station WMML's classic country format (which had itself relocated from WKBE to that station just six months earlier) as "Big Country 104.9 & 97.9". The first song under the simulcast was "The Thunder Rolls" by Garth Brooks.
