= WNYQ =

- Hudson Falls, New York; United States
- Broadcast area: Glens Falls–Adirondack Mountains
- Frequency: 101.7 MHz
- Branding: Classic Hits Q101.7

Programming
- Format: Classic hits–classic rock

Ownership
- Owner: Pamal Broadcasting; (6 Johnson Road Licenses, Inc.)
- Sister stations: WENU, WFFG-FM, WKBE, WMML

History
- First air date: October 19, 1983; 42 years ago
- Former call signs: WENU (1983–2000); WENU-FM (2000–2006); WQYQ (2006)

Technical information
- Licensing authority: FCC
- Facility ID: 3158
- Class: A
- ERP: 4,600 watts
- HAAT: 55 meters (180 ft)
- Transmitter coordinates: 43°22′40.2″N 73°39′54.4″W

Links
- Public license information: Public file; LMS
- Webcast: Listen live
- Website: www.classichitswnyq.com

WNYQ (101.7 FM) is a commercial radio station licensed to Hudson Falls, New York, and serving the Glens Falls area of the Adirondack Mountains. It is owned by Pamal Broadcasting and airs a rock-leaning classic hits radio format. WNYQ has local air talent including "Rockin" Rick Harrington, John Lawrence, Chad O'Hara, and Mark "Mongo" Wilson. Former air talent includes John "Killer" Clark, previously an air personality at classic rock stations WPYX and WQBK-FM in nearby Albany.

WNYQ has an effective radiated power (ERP) of 4,600 watts. Its transmitter is off Route 149 in Lake George, New York.

== History ==
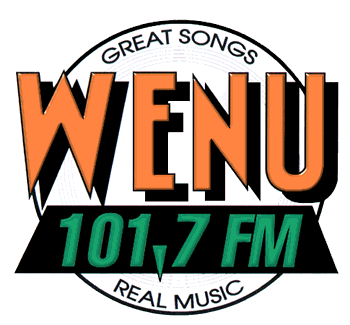
Former logo of the radio station used from late 1983 through September 18, 2006

The station signed on as WENU on October 19, 1983. It changed its call sign to WQYQ in September 2006, and the following month, became WNYQ.
