= John Mulrooney =

American comedian, radio and television presenter and actor (1957/1958–2025)

- Born: August 27, 1958; New York City, U.S.
- Died: December 29, 2025 (aged 67); Coxsackie, New York, U.S.
- Occupations: Comedian, radio host, television host, actor, writer

John Mulrooney (August 27, 1958 – December 29, 2025) was an American comedian, radio and television show host, actor and writer.

== Life and career ==
Mulrooney was born and raised in Brooklyn, New York. He began his career on the NYC comedy scene at Pips comedy club in Sheepshead Bay, Brooklyn in 1979 and later performed at Rick Newman's Catch a Rising Star, Comic Strip, the Improv and Dangerfield’s in Manhattan. Mulrooney transitioned into television in the early eighties on a show called Comedy Tonight. In addition to his 13 stand-up appearances he also wrote and produced original content for 165 episodes. Mulrooney competed on Star Search and lost, but it helped his early career, since he was hired to work for the program, writing comedy and doing audience warm up. Upon relocating to Los Angeles, California, Mulrooney became a "regular" at The Improvisation, The World Famous Comedy Store and The Laugh Factory.

After Joan Rivers left as host of The Late Show on the Fox network in 1987, Mulrooney was asked to replace her. After a few months, The Late Show was cancelled due to low ratings and strong competition from The Tonight Show and Nightline. Mulrooney hosted Comic Strip: Live, first for a year as a local show on KTTV in Los Angeles in 1988, continuing when Fox TV programming executives expanded the show to Fox-owned stations, then network-wide on Saturday nights, for an additional year. He continued to appear on other TV shows such as An Evening at the Improv, Hollywood Squares, Showtime, HBO and Comedy Central and filling in as guest host for Pat Sajak on The Pat Sajak Show.

In 1994 Mulrooney wrote, and starred, for two seasons in a sitcom called Midtown North which aired on Comedy Central. He was also one of the featured comics on Andrew Dice Clay's Valentine's Day Massacre pay-per-view special in 1994. Then in 1996 Mulrooney moved back to NYC to begin a career in radio. He co-hosted The John and Abbey show, an afternoon drive-time show which aired on 105.1 - The Buzz. During this time Mulrooney earned the N.Y.S.B. Broadcaster's Award for Best On-Air Personality. In 1998 he made the switch to morning radio and teamed up with veteran radio host, Bob Wolf. Wolf and Mulrooney in the Morning went on to beat The Howard Stern Show in the ratings in 2000. John then won Best On-Air Personality for a second time. After a syndication deal drew them to Cleveland, the pair split up and continued to work in radio.

In 2007 and 2009, Mulrooney toured Israel on the Crossroads Comedy Tour, a series of benefit concerts for the Crossroads Center in Jerusalem, sponsored by Jerry Seinfeld.

In 2008 and 2010, Mulrooney travelled to the Middle East to entertain troops as part of the - Incoming Comedy Tour. In 2014 Mulrooney hosted his own show on iHeartRADIO, Mulrooney in the Morning. He continued to tour comedy clubs, casinos and corporate functions until his death.

Mulrooney died suddenly at his home in Coxsackie, New York, on December 29, 2025, at the age of 67.

== Filmography ==
- "The Late Show" (1988)...Host
- "Comic Strip Live" (1989) TV Series .... Host
- Great Balls of Fire! (1989) .... Jack Paar
- The Bistro (2016) .... Jack Morgan

== Television appearances include ==
- Penthouse Vegas Fox
- Tough Crowd with Colin Quinn Comedy Central
- Hollywood Squares Syndicated
- Comedy Tonight Syndicated
- Star Search Syndicated
- Candid Camera Co-host CBS
- The Late Show Host Fox
- King of the Mountain Host Fox
- Comic Strip Live Host Fox
- The Pat Sajak Show Guest Host CBS
- An Evening at the Improv A&E
- Caroline's Comedy Hour A&E
- Comedy Album Host A&E
- Comedy on the Road A&E
- A Pair of Jokers A&E
- A Different Point of View Host A&E
- Playboy Channel Comedy Hour
- Anything for Love Host Syndicated
- The Good Life Series Regular NBC
- Midtown North Series Regular Comedy Central

== Radio ==
- 105.1 FM "MIX 105" New York, N.Y. Morning show host
- 105.1 FM "THE BUZZ" New York, N.Y. The John and Abbey Show
- 106.5 FM "PYX 106" Albany, N.Y. Wakin' up with the Wolf and Mulrooney
- 100.7 FM WMMS "THE BUZZARD" Cleveland, Ohio Wakin' up with the Wolf and Mulrooney
- 93.7 FM "HOT TALK RADIO" Albany, N.Y. Mulrooney in the Morning
- Howard 101 Sirius Satellite Radio New York, N.Y. The Sirius Radio Road Show
- 104.9 FM WZMR "THE EDGE" Albany, N.Y. Mulrooney in the Morning with Mike the Enforcer
- 101.5 FM 2010WPDH Poughkeepsie, N.Y. Wakin' Up with Coop and Mulrooney
- iHeartRADIO - 2014 Mulrooney in the Morning
