= WKLI-FM =

- Albany, New York; United States
- Broadcast area: Capital District
- Frequency: 100.9 MHz
- Branding: 100.9/107.1 The Cat

Programming
- Format: Country
- Affiliations: Compass Media Networks

Ownership
- Owner: Pamal Broadcasting; (6 Johnson Road Licenses, Inc.)
- Sister stations: WAJZ; WFLY; WINU; WROW; WYJB

History
- First air date: 1972 (as WWOM)
- Former call signs: WWOM (1972–1981); WWOM-FM (1981–1986); WKLI (1986–1999); WCPT (1999–2002)
- Call sign meaning: "K-Lite" (former format)

Technical information
- Licensing authority: FCC
- Facility ID: 4682
- Class: A
- ERP: 6,000 watts
- HAAT: 91 meters (299 ft)
- Transmitter coordinates: 42°43′55.1″N 73°52′55.1″W
- Repeater: 107.1 WKBE (Corinth)

Links
- Public license information: Public file; LMS
- Webcast: Listen live
- Website: www.thecatalbany.com

WKLI-FM (100.9 MHz, "100.9/107.1 The Cat") is a commercial radio station, licensed to Albany, New York, and serving the Capital District, including Schenectady and Troy. The station is owned by Pamal Broadcasting and broadcasts a country music radio format. Its programming is simulcast on WKBE (107.1 FM) in Corinth.

WKLI-FM has an effective radiated power (ERP) of 6,000 watts. Its transmitter is off Kings Road near the New York State Thruway in Guilderland near the boundary of Colonie and Schenectady, adjacent to the station's former radio studios. WKLI-FM now has its studios and offices in the Pamal Broadcasting facility on Johnson Road in Latham near Crossroads Plaza.

== History ==
The 100.9 frequency signed on in 1972 as WWOM (Wonderful World of Music), an easy listening station going against up established beautiful music outlets WROW-FM and WHRL. Unable to make headway, the station quickly gave up easy listening and went through a variation of formats, including several variants of adult contemporary (mid-1970s and again starting in 1980), soft rock (1977–78), and then album-oriented rock. Briefly in late 1978/early 1979, it identified itself as "WWOM-Albany NY's Best Rock" in its legal ID, putting it into direct competition with WQBK-FM 103.9.

With the disco craze catching on, the station abruptly flipped to disco music early in the spring of 1979, and then to soft AC in the summer of 1980. During this period, the station struggled in both ratings and revenue.

In 1984, local businessman William Sellwood bought WWOM as a companion to WABY (1400 AM). Two years later, Sellwood relaunched the station as "K-Lite 101" with the WKLI calls coming into use. With no FM competition for mainstream adult contemporary music, the station quickly became a success and spent several years in the Top 5 stations (12+) in the market with several Arbitron ratings books as the No. 1 in some demographics and time periods, a rarity for a lower powered signal in the Albany market. In 1990, Paul Bendat purchased the station. After WROW-FM flipped to WYJB in early 1994, WKLI's ratings underwent a decline as listeners flocked to the far stronger signal of WYJB for adult contemporary music.

On January 12, 1996, WKBE (100.3 FM) joined WKLI in a simulcast of "K-Lite" (without the '101' brand); however, the format ended just over two months later when WKLI and WKBE flipped to a Top 40/CHR format as "K-100" at 3 p.m. on March 18. With the flip, the station became one of the charter affiliates of the syndication attempt of the Scott & Todd morning show from WPLJ in New York City, which the station played as a homecoming of sorts for Todd Pettengill (an alum of rival WFLY). Though K-100 stayed competitive with WFLY and WRVE, changes in the format and the end of syndication of Scott & Todd in October 1998 marked a quick decline for the station which, by the end of 1998, was seeing ratings not seen in 3 decades.

In February 1999, Paul Bendat sold his stations to Tele-Media, Inc., which relaunched the "K-100" format three months later as modern adult contemporary "The Point" gaining the new calls of WCPT; the WKLI calls and the old "K-Lite" name moved down to 94.5 FM (now WYKV). The station struggled to find an audience over the next two years amid staff and management changes as well as corporate problems on Tele-Media's end. Tele-Media sold WCPT and WKBE to Pamal Broadcasting in August 2001 with the sale closing in late October. While WKBE kept a modified version of the "Point" format, WCPT became adult standards/soft adult contemporary under the "Magic" name with the WKLI calls returning soon thereafter. Under this format, the station was always one of the top rated stations in the Albany market. As Magic, the station would play Christmas music from mid-November to Christmas Day each year (starting in 2005 and until 2009, the last Christmas season under the format).

Logo as "Rock 100.9"

Pamal announced on February 8, 2010, that "Magic" would move to sister station WROW, with WKLI-FM adopting a new format after a brief simulcast period. After two weeks of simulcasting WROW, and a brief stunt with Christmas music and country, the station flipped to a variety hits format as 100.9 The Bridge on February 24, 2010, with "Under the Bridge" by Red Hot Chili Peppers being the first (and final) song of the format. However, the variety hits format failed to compete with dominant WRVE and would also take ratings away from sister WYJB, and the station saw its lowest ratings in over a decade. After 18 months under the Bridge format, WKLI-FM would return to a rock format for the first time since 1979 with a flip to active rock at noon on September 2, 2011, with "Wicked Garden" by Stone Temple Pilots being the first song played, putting the station in competition with WQBK-FM once again and, to a lesser extent, WPYX. By late 2013, the station had gone for more of a classic rock format in order to compete with dominant classic rock station WPYX.

At Noon on October 10, 2013, WKLI changed their format to country, branded as "The Cat", simulcasting sister station WZMR until December 13, when WZMR began stunting with sound effects of a man hiking until Midnight on December 14, 2013, when it flipped to AAA as "104.9 the Peak".

In 2018, with the demise of sister station WINU's sports format, WKLI-FM and sister station WROW added play-by-play of the New York Mets and New England Patriots. WKLI played Patriots games during conflicts with Mets baseball on WROW (which were slated to move to WKLI only starting 2019, however this did not take place due to Mets radio network realignments). The Patriots also left WKLI after the 2018 season, leaving the Albany metro area without Patriots radio broadcasts.

On March 21, 2023, WKLI's Saratoga area sister station WKBE flipped to a simulcast of The Cat, as "100.9/107.1 The Cat".
