= WROW =

Radio station in Albany, New York

- Albany, New York; United States
- Broadcast area: Capital District
- Frequency: 590 kHz
- Branding: Magic 590-1410 AM & 96.9-100.5 FM

Programming
- Format: Soft oldies

Ownership
- Owner: Pamal Broadcasting; (6 Johnson Road Licenses, Inc.)
- Sister stations: WAJZ, WENU, WFLY, WINU, WKLI, WYJB

History
- First air date: September 30, 1947

Technical information
- Licensing authority: FCC
- Facility ID: 54853
- Class: B
- Power: 5,000 watts (day); 1,000 watts (night)
- Transmitter coordinates: 42°34′24.9″N 73°47′9.8″W
- Translator: 100.5 W263CG (Albany)
- Repeater: 1410 WENU (South Glens Falls)

Links
- Public license information: Public file; LMS
- Webcast: Listen live
- Website: www.albanymagic.com

WROW (590 AM) is a commercial radio station licensed to Albany, New York, United States, and serving the Capital District, including Albany, Schenectady and Troy. Owned by Pamal Broadcasting, the station features a soft oldies format branded as "Magic 590-1410 AM and 96.5-100.5 FM" with studios located in Latham. WROW serves as the local affiliate for CBS Radio News and is the Emergency Alert System (EAS) primary entry point for Northeastern New York state.

WROW's transmitter is sited on Weisheit Road in Glenmont, near the New York State Thruway. WROW is also heard over low-power FM translator W263CG at 100.5 MHz and on WENU 1410 AM (which itself has a translator on 96.9 FM) in South Glens Falls.

== History ==
=== Early years ===
On September 30, 1947, WROW first signed on. A startup company, Hudson Valley Broadcasting, acquired the rights to the frequency. The studios were at 112 State Street and Dr. J.J. Quinlan served as president. At the outset, the station had an affiliation with the Mutual Radio Network, switching to ABC in 1950.

The relationship with ABC was short lived, with WROW taking the CBS affiliation from 980 WTRY in November 1954, in a deal to get the rights to the CBS television network for its soon-to-debut co-owned TV station, WROW-TV channel 41, (today's ABC-affiliated WTEN on channel 10). In 1957, Hudson Valley Broadcasting became the Capital Cities Television Corporation, as Albany is the capital city of New York State. In 1960, the name was changed to Capital Cities Broadcasting, to reflect its increasing radio holdings, including WROW. (WROW is historically notable for being the first station owned by Capital Cities Communications, which in 1985 purchased the American Broadcasting Company, becoming one of the largest media companies in existence at the time of that purchase.)

The CBS Radio affiliation has remained on WROW since 1950, and was shared for a time with 100.9 WKLI-FM, the original home of the Magic format, beginning in 2001.

=== Beautiful music ===
In the late 1950s, WROW decided to flip to a Top 40 format, the first such attempt in the Capital District, which was initially a hit. But Capital Cities' success with the beautiful music format in New York City and other markets led WROW to switch to easy listening around 1963.

In October 1966, WROW signed on 95.5 WROW-FM (now WYJB), with the two stations simulcasting. On January 1, 1967, the Federal Communications Commission stopped allowing AM and FM stations in large cities to simulcast, except for 25% of their programming. To get around this rule, WROW-AM-FM began "shadowcasting" which allowed the same commercials to run on both stations, although the music on one station had to be delayed for a short time before it could be heard on the other station. (Most listeners were not even aware of this practice.) The combined signals of WROW and WROW-FM were among the most popular and financially successful radio outlets in the Capital District for most of the 1970s and 1980s.

In 1983, Capital Cities sold WROW-AM-FM to JAG Communications, owner of WLKW-AM-FM in Providence, Rhode Island, for $3.2 million; the company was controlled by John A. Gambling, morning host at WOR in New York City. JAG would sell WROW-AM-FM and WLKW-FM to Wilks/Schwartz Broadcasting for $15.39 million in 1987; the WROW stations soon ended up in the hands of Radio Terrace, owners of WLNA and WHUD in Peekskill a month later.

=== Switch to news/talk ===
One of WROW's logos as a news/talk station.

The aging demographics of the easy listening format led to a split in programming for WROW-AM-FM in 1991, with WROW-AM keeping the easy listening sound. In 1993, the WROW stations were bought by Albany Broadcasting, which soon made changes to both stations. In February 1994, WROW flipped to an all-news format by day with talk programming nights and weekends.

Though a good idea on paper, the news format had low ratings and was a high expense format. In 1996, the station flipped to a full-time talk format. A slow starter at first, the arrival in 1997 of former WQBK host and program director Paul Vandenburgh helped improve ratings and made WROW a formidable second talk station next to talk leader WGY 810 AM. The station had shows hosted by Capital reporter Fred Dicker; Albany Mayor Jerry Jennings, Dan Lynch, Jaime Roberts and Joe Lirosi and more.

In 2007, WROW began overhauling its programming. Vandenburgh left WROW in October 2007 to become part-owner of WGDJ 1300 AM, a station on WQBK's former frequency. Leaving along with Vandenburgh to go to WGDJ were the Live from the Capitol report with Fred Dicker and a weekly interview show with Albany Mayor Jerry Jennings. Mike and the Mad Dog, which had aired as WROW's afternoon show as a simulcast with 660 WFAN in New York City, was dropped at this time as well.

=== Programming during the talk radio era ===
As a talk station, WROW's local morning show was co-hosted by Steve van Zandt and Jackie Donovan. Syndicated talk shows heard the rest of the day on the station included: The Glenn Beck Program; The Radio Factor with Bill O'Reilly; John Gibson, Dave Ramsey, Alan Colmes and Joey Reynolds. Weekend syndicated programs included Brian and the Judge, Lars Larson, and Bill Cunningham; the first two of which previously aired on weekdays. WROW also held a sports play-by-play contract with the Albany River Rats ice hockey team, and that continued after the format change. Siena College men's basketball was once carried on the station, but moved to WGDJ in 2009.

In the past, WROW has aired other daily syndicated shows including Brian and the Judge (and its predecessor hosted by Tony Snow), Laura Ingraham, and a simulcast of the WFAN-based Mike and the Mad Dog. Past local programming has included "Afternoon Drive with Sherman Baldwin," "Live from the State Capitol," now heard on WGDJ, "The Mark Williams Show," and "The Scotto Show," hosted by Scott Allen Miller.

=== Becoming Magic 590 ===
WROW ended the talk format on February 8, 2010, citing the difficulty of competing with WGDJ and WGY. The station then adopted its current format, which was moved from WKLI-FM, and was simulcast on both stations for two weeks, to help listeners adjust to the change. By mid-February, WROW was the exclusive radio home of the "Magic" format, with WKLI-FM switching to adult hits.

WROW formerly broadcast in C-QUAM AM stereo, but no longer operates in stereo as of 2017. In April 2018, with the demise of WINU's sports format, WROW and sister station WKLI-FM became Albany's radio home of the New York Mets baseball and New England Patriots football teams for the 2018 season. The Mets were slated to move to WKLI-FM in 2019. However this did not come to pass due to network realignments, and the Patriots also left in 2019, leaving the Albany metro area without radio coverage of either team.

On January 3, 2019, WROW began simulcasting its format on sister station WENU 1410 AM in South Glens Falls, also heard on WENU's FM translator at 96.9 FM.

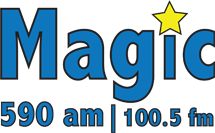
Logo before prioritizing the FM over the AM
