= Gord Kruppke =

Canadian ice hockey player (born 1969)

- Born: April 2, 1969 (age 55); Slave Lake, Alberta, Canada
- Height: 6 ft 1 in (185 cm)
- Weight: 200 lb (91 kg; 14 st 4 lb)
- Position: Defence
- Shot: Right
- Played for: Detroit Red Wings
- NHL draft: 32nd overall, 1987; Detroit Red Wings
- Playing career: 1989–1999

Gordon W. Kruppke (born April 2, 1969) is a Canadian former professional ice hockey player who played 23 games in the National Hockey League for the Detroit Red Wings between 1991 and 1994. The rest of his career, which lasted from 1989 to 1999, was spent in the minor leagues.

== Career statistics ==
=== Regular season and playoffs ===
			Regular season					Playoffs
Season	Team	League	GP	G	A	Pts	PIM	GP	G	A	Pts	PIM
1985–86	Prince Albert Raiders	WHL	62	1	8	9	81	20	4	4	8	22
1986–87	Prince Albert Raiders	WHL	49	2	10	12	129	8	0	0	0	9
1987–88	Prince Albert Raiders	WHL	54	8	8	16	113	10	0	0	0	46
1988–89	Prince Albert Raiders	WHL	62	6	26	32	254	3	0	0	0	11
1989–90	Adirondack Red Wings	AHL	59	2	12	14	103	—	—	—	—	—
1990–91	Detroit Red Wings	NHL	4	0	0	0	0	—	—	—	—	—
1990–91	Adirondack Red Wings	AHL	45	1	8	9	153	—	—	—	—	—
1991–92	Adirondack Red Wings	AHL	65	3	9	12	208	16	0	1	1	52
1992–93	Detroit Red Wings	NHL	10	0	0	0	20	—	—	—	—	—
1992–93	Adirondack Red Wings	AHL	41	2	12	14	197	9	1	2	3	30
1993–94	Detroit Red Wings	NHL	9	0	0	0	12	—	—	—	—	—
1993–94	Adirondack Red Wings	AHL	54	2	9	11	157	—	—	—	—	—
1994–95	Adirondack Red Wings	AHL	48	2	9	11	157	—	—	—	—	—
1994–95	St. John's Maple Leafs	AHL	3	0	1	1	6	—	—	—	—	—
1995–96	Houston Aeros	IHL	50	0	4	4	119	—	—	—	—	—
1996–97	Houston Aeros	IHL	43	0	5	5	91	9	0	1	1	14
1997–98	Houston Aeros	IHL	71	2	6	8	171	4	0	0	0	27
1998–99	Houston Aeros	IHL	19	0	2	2	58	—	—	—	—	—
1998–99	Grand Rapids Griffins	IHL	42	0	5	5	93	—	—	—	—	—
AHL totals			315	12	60	72	1034	37	2	6	8	104
IHL totals			225	2	22	24	532	13	0	1	1	41
NHL totals			23	0	0	0	32	—	—	—	—	—

== Awards ==
- WHL East Second All-Star Team – 1989
