= WAJZ =

- Voorheesville, New York; United States
- Broadcast area: Capital Region
- Frequency: 96.3 MHz
- Branding: Jamz 96.3

Programming
- Format: Rhythmic contemporary
- Affiliations: Compass Media Networks

Ownership
- Owner: Pamal Broadcasting; (6 Johnson Road Licenses, Inc.)
- Sister stations: WFLY, WINU, WKLI-FM, WROW, WYJB

History
- First air date: May 24, 1991
- Former call signs: WCDA (1991–1996); WPTR (1996–1999)
- Call sign meaning: "Albany Jamz"

Technical information
- Licensing authority: FCC
- Facility ID: 35537
- Class: A
- ERP: 470 watts
- HAAT: 293 meters (961 ft)
- Transmitter coordinates: 42°38′11.3″N 74°0′0.5″W

Links
- Public license information: Public file; LMS
- Webcast: Listen live
- Website: www.jamz963.com

WAJZ (96.3 FM) is a commercial radio station licensed to Voorheesville, New York, and serving the Capital District, including Albany, Schenectady and Troy. The station is owned by Pamal Broadcasting and broadcasts a rhythmic contemporary radio format that leans toward urban contemporary. In morning drive time, WAJZ carries the nationally syndicated "Jubal Show" from KBKS-FM in Seattle.

WAJZ has an effective radiated power (ERP) of 470 watts. The transmitter is on Pinnacle Road in Helderberg Escarpment tower farm in New Scotland, amid the towers for other Albany-area TV and FM stations.

== Programming ==
Since the launch of Jamz 96.3 on December 23, 1998, it has become one of the most popular radio stations in the Albany market, initially as an urban contemporary radio station, and evolving to rhythmic contemporary by September 2005. As of 2011, the station tends to lean more urban rather than dance (similar to WQHT in New York City) to avoid competing with co-owned mainstream CHR WFLY.

== History ==
The station signed on the air on May 24, 1991, as WCDA (the station had no relation to WTEN-TV, which was previously WCDA, or its Adams, Massachusetts satellite station, WCDC-TV). It offered a locally programmed adult contemporary format, calling itself CD96.3. The format ran for three years, featuring live, personality-driven programming that included a full-time news staff. The station came into a market already featuring a glut of other adult contemporary stations, and unable to overcome this, three years later the format was changed to country music, initially using programming from the Jones Satellite to target the market's top station, WGNA-FM. It found little success through automated programming.

Eventually, WCDA brought back in more-locally produced programming. Like most locally owned and operated "single" stations, WCDA found itself competing against ownership groups that had acquired multiple stations. The Albany market, like most radio markets in the nation, saw all of its individually owned stations eventually sold to larger group broadcasters, WCDA among them.

In August 1996, Albany Broadcasting (forerunner to today's Pamal Broadcasting) purchased WCDA, used the WPTR call sign the company retained from the sale of 1540 AM, and relaunched the station under an approach that included more recent and past country hits than WGNA. After 18 months of struggling ratings, and after a weekend of Halloween-related stunting, the station relaunched as Power Country 96.3, focusing on newer, more youthful country songs, on November 3, 1997. The relaunch had no effect on its ratings as the station languished near the bottom, even with rights to Siena College men's basketball and New York Yankees baseball.

On December 23, 1998, WPTR changed its format to urban contemporary, the first FM station in the market aimed at the African American community. Jamz 96.3 took the WAJZ call letters several weeks later. For its first half-decade, the station maintained very good numbers, but increased competition forced the station to reevaluate.

In September 2005, it started shifting its direction towards a rhythmic contemporary approach. Since 2011, the station has returned to an urban contemporary direction, with most dance product airing on sister station WFLY; however, WAJZ is still reported as rhythmic contemporary by Mediabase and Nielsen BDS.
