= WFFG-FM =

- Warrensburg, New York; United States
- Broadcast area: Adirondack Region
- Frequency: 100.3 MHz
- Branding: Froggy 100.3

Programming
- Format: Country music

Ownership
- Owner: Pamal Broadcasting; (6 Johnson Road Licenses, Inc.)
- Sister stations: WENU; WKBE; WMML; WNYQ

History
- First air date: November 1, 1990
- Former call signs: WKBE (1990–2014)
- Former frequencies: 100.5 MHz (1990–1995)
- Call sign meaning: "Froggy"

Technical information
- Licensing authority: FCC
- Facility ID: 33396
- Class: B1
- ERP: 1,450 watts
- HAAT: 400 meters (1,300 ft)
- Transmitter coordinates: 43°25′12.2″N 73°45′37.4″W

Links
- Public license information: Public file; LMS
- Webcast: Listen live
- Website: www.froggy1003.com

WFFG-FM (100.3 MHz), known as "Froggy 100.3", is a country music radio station licensed to Warrensburg, New York, and is owned by Pamal Broadcasting. The studios and offices are on Everts Avenue in Queensbury, New York.

WFFG-FM has an effective radiated power (ERP) of 1,450 watts. Its transmitter is near Black Spruce Mountain in the town of Warrensburg, Warren County, New York, near the Adirondack Northway. The tower is shared with WCKM-FM and WCQL. Thanks to its tall tower, WFFG-FM's signal can be heard as far south as southern Albany and Rensselaer counties, and as far north as Schroon Lake and Elizabethtown.

== History ==
WFFG-FM signed on November 1, 1990, on 100.5 MHz with 6 kilowatts ERP as adult contemporary KB-100 with the WKBE call letters. Locally owned by Karamatt Broadcasting, LLC, KB-100 aired mostly local programming with some off-peak timeslots carrying syndicated programs and also aired local programs such as high school sporting events. These events, however, were soon taken by WCKM-FM when that station signed on.

In 1994, Karamatt filed an application to upgrade for a 6 kilowatt Class A station to a 25 kilowatt Class B1 station as a response to the then-new application of the similarly powered WNYQ with the station moving down to 100.3 MHz in the process. The move took place in summer 1995; however, the increased value of the station led to its sale to Paul Bendat (owner of WABY, WABY-FM, and WKLI in Albany) in March 1996 after two months of running WKLI's K-Lite format under an LMA. With WKLI's adult contemporary format on the decline, Bendat saw an opportunity, and both WKLI and WKBE flipped to CHR K-100 with the closing of the purchase of WKBE.

Though the initial year of WKBE's new format did well in the ratings, outlasting upstart WHTR, the station soon began to enter a period of decline, and in February 1999, Bendat sold his stations to Tele-Media, Inc. After a three-month stunting period, the stations relaunched as modern adult contemporary The Point that May (with WKLI taking the WCPT calls in the process). After two years of struggling against a relaunched WNYQ in Glens Falls as well as WFLY and WRVE in Albany, Tele-Media sold WCPT and WKBE in August 2001 to Pamal Broadcasting with the sale closing that October.

While WCPT (which reverted to WKLI) took a new format, WKBE instead retained the Point format, though now programming was based out of Glens Falls. This format has evolved over the last decade from the modern adult contemporary approach in place at the outset to a variation more similar to CHR and eventually to a modern rock-leaning format.

From November 22, 2006, to December 25, 2006, the station stunted with a temporary Christmas music format, and after the month-long stint of Christmas music, WKBE began its lean towards a modern rock-oriented format on December 26, by introducing a new logo and slogan (Today's Modern Mix).

After the relaunch in 2006, the station's playlist included mainly modern and active rock artists, such as Alanis Morissette, Evanescence, No Doubt, Red Hot Chili Peppers, and Green Day, as well as pop rock acts such as Kelly Clarkson, Christina Perri, Paramore, Neon Trees, and Avril Lavigne. In the late 2000s, soul music artists such as Adele, Duffy, and KT Tunstall began to be added to the playlist; however, by 2010, the station has become closer to a true modern rock format, although the station still plays some modern AC and AAA artists which are not found on most modern rock stations. By 2012, Arbitron, Mediabase and Nielsen BDS reported the station under the hot adult contemporary format.

On December 27, 2013, WKBE and sister station WFFG-FM swapped formats and call letters; WKBE became a country music format as Froggy 100.3 and WFFG-FM became a modern AC/AAA format as 107.1 The Point.
