= WYJB =

Adult contemporary radio station in Albany, New York, United States

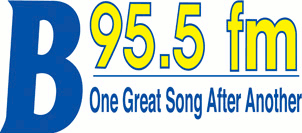
- Albany, New York; United States
- Broadcast area: Capital District
- Frequency: 95.5 MHz
- Branding: B95.5

Programming
- Format: Adult contemporary
- Affiliations: Premiere Networks

Ownership
- Owner: Pamal Broadcasting; (6 Johnson Road Licenses, Inc.)
- Sister stations: WAJZ, WFLY, WINU, WKLI-FM, WROW

History
- First air date: 1966 (as WROW-FM)
- Former call signs: WROW-FM (1966–1993)
- Call sign meaning: None; randomly assigned by the FCC

Technical information
- Licensing authority: FCC
- Facility ID: 836
- Class: B
- ERP: 12,000 watts
- HAAT: 312 meters (1,024 ft)
- Transmitter coordinates: 42°38′11.3″N 73°59′58.5″W

Links
- Public license information: Public file; LMS
- Webcast: Listen live
- Website: b95.com

WYJB (95.5 FM) is a commercial radio station licensed to Albany, New York, and serving the Capital District, including Schenectady and Troy. The station is owned by Pamal Broadcasting and broadcasts an adult contemporary radio format, switching to Christmas music for much of November and December. On evenings, WYJB carries the nationally syndicated call-in and dedications show hosted by Delilah. The station's radio studios and offices are on Johnson Road in Latham.

WYJB has an effective radiated power (ERP) of 12,000 watts. It transmits from the Helderberg Mountains antenna farm off Pinnacle Road in Voorheesville.

== History ==
=== Beautiful music ===
The 95.5 frequency was originally allocated to the unbuilt WXKW-FM in 1950. It signed on in 1966 as WROW-FM, sister station to Capital Cities Communications flagship outlet WROW (590 AM). Initially, it simulcast the AM's beautiful music programming. WROW-AM-FM played quarter hour sweeps of mostly instrumental cover versions of popular songs, with some Broadway and Hollywood show tunes.

Around 1967, the Federal Communications Commission (FCC) required FM stations in larger cities to originate their own programming. WROW-FM began "shadowcasting" its easy listening sound. The AM and FM station continued to run the same commercials and aired similar music, but not exactly at the same time. Announcers would prerecord weather and news briefs for the FM, while reading them live on the AM station. Technically, they were separately programmed, although most listeners did not realize it. This arrangement remained until after Capital Cities sold the WROW stations in 1983, at which point the FM became the primary station and the AM station became the simulcast.

=== Soft AC ===
By the late 1980s, easy listening stations began attracting older listeners, so WROW-FM began to modernize its sound with more soft vocals and fewer instrumentals. WROW-FM evolved to a soft adult contemporary format as EZ95.5 in early 1991, with easy listening moving solely to the AM side. In 1993, the WROW stations were sold to Albany Broadcasting (forerunner to today's Pamal Broadcasting), at which point an overhaul of the station took place.

On January 3, 1994, EZ95.5 relaunched with a more mainstream AC sound as The New B95.5 with the WYJB call sign coming into effect several days prior. Within five years of the launch, B95.5 forced the weaker competition out of the AC format, including 100.9 WKLI and many of its future rival stations, such as 94.5 FM and Buzz 105.7.

=== Personalities ===
In 2001, Delilah was added to the station in the evenings after WKLI (then on 94.5 FM) flipped to classic rock; and continued to develop a slight hot AC lean. Five years later, the long-time morning show Chuck and Kelly moved to competitor WBZZ (originally on 104.5, later on 105.7), and Ric Mitchell and Laura Daniels (formerly of WFLY) were named Chuck and Kelly's replacements. In 2010, Ric Mitchell left WYJB, with Chuck Taylor returning to the morning show shortly after. When WBZZ dumped adult contemporary that year, it left WYJB and rimshot competitor WQAR (now WJKE) as Albany's only adult contemporary radio stations.

On November 9, 2011, the station switched to Christmas music for the first time, in response to the flip of oldies station 98.3 WTRY-FM to all-Christmas the same day. Shortly after Christmas, the station tweaked into more of a hot AC sound with new slogans and jingles. However, the station still reports as adult contemporary on Nielsen BDS and Mediabase charts.
