= WKAJ =

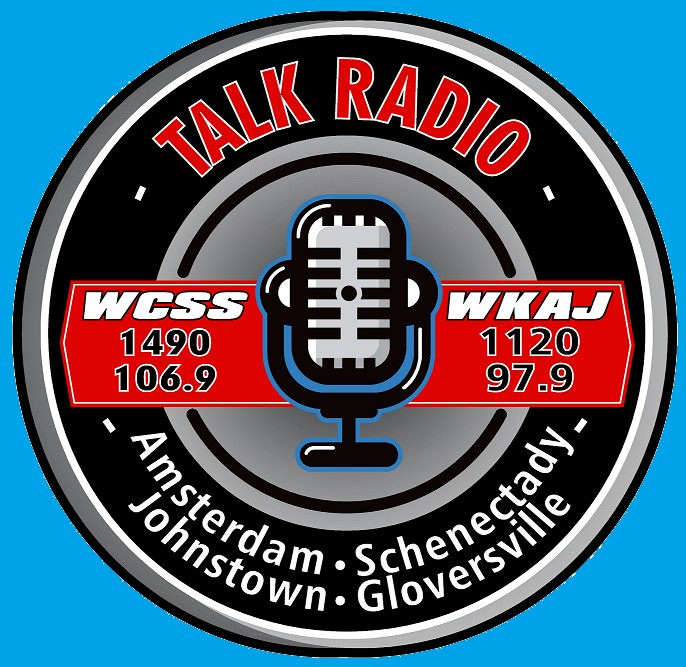
- Saint Johnsville, New York; United States
- Frequency: 1120 kHz

Programming
- Format: News/Talk

Ownership
- Owner: Cranesville Block Company, Inc.
- Sister stations: WCSS, WIZR, WYVS

History
- First air date: 2013

Technical information
- Licensing authority: FCC
- Facility ID: 160470
- Class: B
- Power: 10,000 watts day, 400 watts night
- Transmitter coordinates: 42°59′59.3″N 74°41′28.5″W
- Translator: 97.9 W250CX (Saint Johnsville)

Links
- Public license information: Public file; LMS
- Website: wkaj1120.com

WKAJ (1120 AM) is a radio station licensed to and transmitting from Saint Johnsville, New York, United States. The station had aired Westwood Oneʼs Real Country format up until late 2020, then switched to Good Time Oldies produced by Westwood One. WKAJ currently simulcasts sister station WCSS's news/talk format. WKAJ is owned by Cranesville Block Company, Inc. When it first signed on, it featured a classic hits format with the slogan "The Bigfoot".

WKAJ 1120 along with its translator W250CX (97.9 FM) and WCSS 1490 with its translator W295CZ (106.9 FM) currently airs a news/talk format.

In August 2024, it was announced that Mariano and Wilhelmina Simms’ Simms Broadcasting will acquire Cranesville Block Company’s four stations and four translators in Upstate New York for $600,000. The stations included in the sale are: 96.5 WYVS Speculator, 930 WIZR/102.9 W275BS Johnstown and 104.3 W282CU Northville along with 1490 WCSS/106.9 W295CZ Amsterdam and 1120 WKAJ/97.9 W250CX Saint Johnsville.
