= WFLY =

Contemporary hit radio station in Albany, New York

- Troy, New York; United States
- Broadcast area: Capital District
- Frequency: 92.3 MHz
- Branding: FLY 92.3

Programming
- Language: English
- Format: Contemporary hit radio

Ownership
- Owner: Pamal Broadcasting; (6 Johnson Road Licenses, Inc.)
- Sister stations: WAJZ; WKLI-FM; WROW; WYJB; WINU

History
- First air date: August 18, 1948
- Call sign meaning: Frank Lloyd York (station founder)

Technical information
- Licensing authority: FCC
- Facility ID: 832
- Class: B
- ERP: 17,000 watts
- HAAT: 259 meters (850 ft)
- Transmitter coordinates: 42°38′16.2″N 73°59′53.4″W

Links
- Public license information: Public file; LMS
- Webcast: Listen live
- Website: www.fly92.com

WFLY (92.3 FM, FLY 92.3) is a contemporary hit radio station licensed to Troy, New York, and serving the Capital District. The station is owned by Pamal Broadcasting and is considered the company's flagship station. The radio studios and offices are at 6 Johnson Road in Latham.

WFLY has an effective radiated power (ERP) of 17,000 watts. The transmitter is located on the Helderberg Escarpment antenna farm on Pinnacle Road in New Scotland, New York. WFLY is the oldest FM radio call sign currently in the Capital District, in use since 1948.

== History ==
=== Rural Radio Network ===
On August 18, 1948, WFLY first signed on as the radio station of The Troy Times Record newspaper. Its publisher was Frank Laurence York, from whose initials the station gets its call letters The station was originally experimental and intended to use an FM signal to broadcast a radio-facsimile image of that day's paper to subscribers with the equipment to receive it. When that technology proved unsuccessful, the station began to be programmed with classical music, news from the paper's staff and local interest programs. Upon sign on, it had an effective radiated power of 5,400 watts.

Beginning in 1949, it was a member of the Rural Radio Network, a service for farming families in remote sections of New York State. The station received network programming via an over the air relay of WVCV in Cherry Valley, New York. The Rural Radio Network later dropped much of its farm content and switched to mostly classical music, which was originated at WQXR in New York City. This was received via over air relay from WKIP-FM on Mount Beacon. This affiliation lasted until 1960, when the Rural Radio Network folded. The classical music continued on WFLY as locally produced programming.

=== Switch to Top 40 ===
By the late 1960s, the FM audience was changing, and the Troy Record had a difficult time funding a classical music station. In 1970, the station switched to a Top 40/oldies format with live disc jockeys. At that point, it was known as "The Big 92". DJs on "The Big 92" included Craig Stevens, Gary Mitchell, Rex Gregory, Dale Lane, Bob Harris, Bob Roberts, Johnny Lance and Chris Calvert. It was the first commercial FM station in the Albany market playing contemporary hits.

While it did well with the new format, protests over the format flip among classical music listeners were numerous. In late 1971, the Troy Record sold WFLY to Functional Broadcasting. The programming was changed to an easy listening/classical hybrid. The partial return of classical was not successful, given the sign-on of WMHT-FM as a full-time classical station. By this time, there were already two other easy listening outlets in the Albany-Schenectady-Troy market.

=== Rock and AC music ===
Functional lost money on WFLY, and sold the station in early 1975, to the Rochester, New York–based Rust Communications Group. After the sale, the station changed programming to an automated album-oriented rock format, billing itself as "sophisticated rock". WFLY went with adult contemporary in 1977, and then reverted to Top 40 in 1979, as FLY 92 FM.

In 1983, the station was sold to Five States Tower Company. It was owned by Rob Dyson, who also owned WPDH and WEOK in Poughkeepsie. In 1987, it was subsequently sold to Jim Morrell's Albany Broadcasting. The second go-around of Top 40 was successful, as WFLY forced AM powerhouses WTRY and WPTR into other formats.

=== Top 40 success ===
Under program director Todd Pettengill (then a little known DJ from WBUG in Amsterdam, New York), the station found success playing Top 40 hits with an enthusiastic DJ staff. In the following years, most rivals eventually failed, though three stations (WGFM/WGY-FM (99 GFM, later Electric 99 WGY FM) from 1982 to 1990, WKLI-FM (K100) from 1996 to 1999, and WKKF (102.3 Kiss FM) since 2000) have survived for an extended period in the Top 40 format.

In 2005, WFLY rebranded as FLY 92.3 and tweaked its format to be more modern rock-leaning to separate itself from co-owned WAJZ, which had taken on a more rhythmic format. However, over time, the station has reverted to a more mainstream CHR format.

== Programming ==
WFLY has aired a contemporary hit radio format since 1979, the second longest-running commercial format in Capital District FM radio. (WGNA-FM's country music format has been in place since 1973). As tastes in contemporary music change, WFLY has also been through several playlist evolutions through the years. However, the station has stayed true to a CHR format for decades.

== Former staff ==
- Ellen Rockwell
- Jack Lawrence
- Michael Morgan
- Dave Redpath
- Shadow Michaels
- Todd Pettengill (later at WPLJ New York City)
- Jim Chandler
- "Magic" Matthew Allen
- Woody Wood
- Liz Dowd
- Candy and Potter Morning Show
- D.Scott (later at WKKF, now at WAJZ)
