= WDCD (AM) =

Radio station in Albany, New York (1948–2017)

- Albany, New York; United States
- Broadcast area: Capital District and Southeastern Adirondacks
- Frequency: 1540 kHz

Ownership
- Owner: DJRA Broadcasting, LLC
- Sister stations: WDCD-FM

History
- First air date: August 10, 1948
- Last air date: October 16, 2017
- Former call signs: WPTR (1948–1995); WDCD (1995–1999); WPTR (1999–2004)
- Call sign meaning: Donald Crawford (founder/CEO of previous owner)

Technical information
- Facility ID: 833
- Class: B
- Power: 50,000 watts
- Transmitter coordinates: 42°44′1.3″N 73°51′47.4″W

WDCD was a news/talk radio station licensed to Albany, New York, United States and served New York's Capital District, Adirondacks, and much of western New England. The station was owned by DJRA Broadcasting, and broadcast on 1540 kHz at 50 kilowatts from a three-tower directional antenna array adjacent to the station's studios in Colonie, New York.

The station went off the air in April 2012 and returned to the air on March 27, 2013 simulcasting Christian talk-formatted WDCD-FM 96.7. On July 10, 2013, The NEW 1540 AM was announced with a news/talk format including Laura Ingraham, Bob Dutko, Neil Boron, Jerry Doyle and Andrea Tantaros. On October 16, 2017, WDCD went silent for the final time. The station surrendered its license to the FCC on September 28, 2018.

== History ==
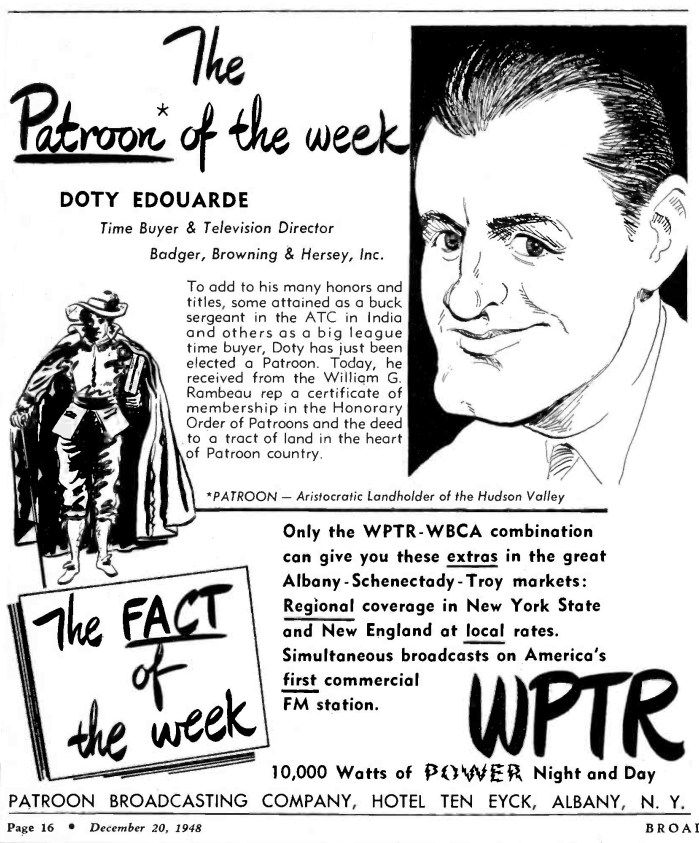
WPTR originated as a sister station to WBCA, an existing independent FM station, which ceased operations in 1952.

WDCD signed on August 10, 1948 as WPTR, with 10,000 watts of power from Colonie. The original call sign request of WNYS was denied due to protests, so the WPTR call letters were requested to reflect the original licensee, Patroon Broadcasting Company, which was owned by Schine Chain Theatres. The studios were located in the Hotel Ten Eyck in Albany. In 1953, the station gained the ABC Radio affiliation from exiting WXKW, and primarily programmed a mix of popular and country music along with news and sports. It was during this period that 1540 increased power to 50,000 watts full-time to combat nighttime interference from co-channel stations KXEL in Waterloo, Iowa, and ZNS-1 in Nassau, Bahamas (although the official explanation to the Federal Communications Commission [FCC] was the "poor ground conductivity" at the transmitter site).

WPTR also had a partnership with a local FM station (W47A/WBCA, the first independent FM radio station in the United States) to produce pre-recorded programming in WBCA's state-of-the-art Schenectady studios.

On September 16, 1953, American Airlines Flight 723 flew between the northeast and center towers of the station's 3 tower array. The plane was cleared for a contact approach to Albany Airport's Runway 10. On final approach, while still miles west of the airport, the Convair descended too low, and, at an altitude of 308 feet (94 m), struck two of the set of three 365 foot (111 m)-tall radio masts arrayed northeast to southwest. The right wing struck the center tower of the three, then the left wing struck the northeast tower. Seven feet of the outer panel of the right wing including the right aileron and control mechanism from the center hinge outboard together with 15 feet of the left outer wing panel and aileron separated from the aircraft.

Ground impact occurred 1,590 feet (480 m) beyond the northeast tower. At this point, the aircraft had rolled to a partially inverted attitude. The nose and left wing struck the ground first. The rest of the airplane fell to earth in short order and caught fire. The aircraft narrowly missed hitting a trailer park on the Albany-Schenectady road. All 28 occupants on board (25 passengers, 2 pilots, and a flight attendant) were killed. The aircraft crashed just north of Central Avenue (NY Route 5). To date, this is the worst aviation accident in the Albany area.

By 1957, in an effort to become more competitive with the more established stations in the region, a new "top 40" format was introduced to Capital District listeners. WTRY also had top 40 programs at the time, but did not devote the entire broadcast day to it. Popular hosts on WPTR included Boom Boom Brannigan, Charlie Brown, and Bob Badger. Brannigan would stay with the station until 1974. The popular rock-and-roll format had a loyal following among listeners both locally, and throughout the northeastern United States, as well as a good portion of eastern and Maritime Canada. In fact, WPTR had a stronger skywave signal in the western Boston suburbs than Boston's own top 40 station, WMEX. By the early 1960s, WTRY had switched to top 40 music programming full-time, and a ratings war of sorts began between the two stations that lasted well into the 1970s. For much of its top 40 heyday, WPTR was the number-one rated station in the Capital District. In 1960, the studios were moved to the more prominent 1820 Central Avenue location in Colonie, where they remained until a fire severely damaged the interior of the building in 1964. A new 10,000-square-foot (930 m^{2}) broadcast facility was constructed at the transmitter site, and programming originated from what became known as the 'Gold studios' until 2005 when the building was demolished. Programming then originated from new digital facilities inside the transmitter building.

With FM stations becoming increasingly popular with younger listeners, WPTR's ratings entered a steady decline in the mid-1970s, and in 1980 the station's owner, Rust Communications (which also owned WFLY, an FM station that had adopted a top 40 format a year earlier) finally submitted and flipped WPTR to country music in 1980 with veteran jock J.W. Wagner at the helm during morning drive. The station regained some popularity, and when ownership did some improvements (including adding AM stereo), the station stayed relatively successful. However, competition from FM rival WGNA led WPTR to leave the format in 1988, subsequently trying different talk radio, sports radio, and all-news radio formats with meager results each time. In 1995, Albany Broadcasting sold WPTR to Crawford Broadcasting, with the sale closing that September.

WDCD logo until 2011

Upon taking over, Crawford changed the call sign to WDCD, in honor of founder Don Crawford. (Albany Broadcasting reclaimed the WPTR calls the following March, on the former WCDA.) The format was changed to contemporary Christian music and related Christian programming. On January 9, 2000, the company brought its secular "Legends" adult standards music format to the station, along with the classic WPTR call letters and Boom Boom Brannigan as morning host; WDCD's religious programming was continued at 96.7 FM, which had simulcast AM 1540 since May 1996. The "Legends" format was a ratings success (putting WPTR back in the top 10 for the first time in 15 years), but a financial pitfall. The situation was greatly complicated when WKLI-FM entered the nostalgia format in November 2001. In 2004, WPTR and WDCD swapped formats and call letters, returning AM 1540 to Christian programming. Several months later, WPTR at the 96.7 FM frequency dropped "Legends" for contemporary Christian music, but flipped to oldies in 2011 due to increased competition from K-LOVE and Air 1, and later began simulcasting WDCD again the same year.

WDCD began broadcasting in HD digital radio in 2006, the second AM station in the area to do so. Later, the station ended HD Radio transmissions, and began signing off between 9-10 every night. WDCD temporarily left the air on April 1, 2012 to make plans for a new format.

WDCD was shut down on October 16, 2017. On September 28, 2018, DJRA Broadcasting, LLC surrendered the station license to the FCC for cancellation. The station's towers were demolished on October 10, 2023.
