= WCSS =

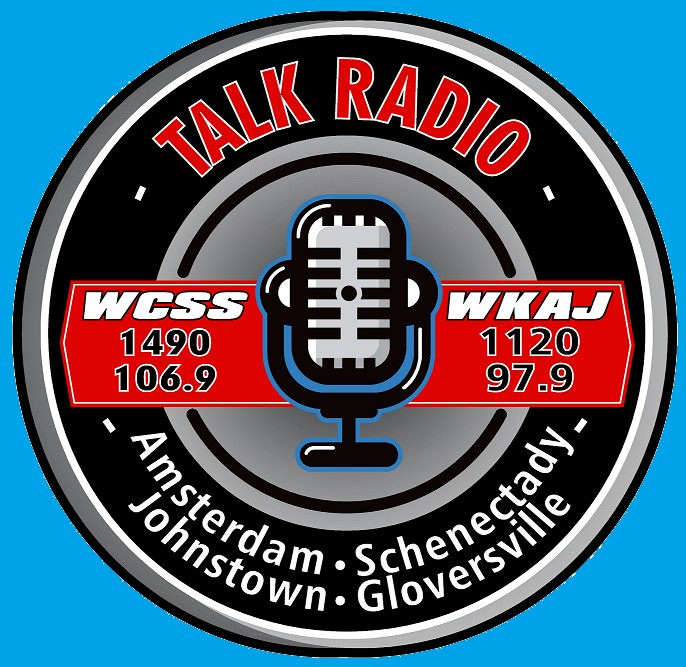
- Amsterdam, New York; United States
- Broadcast area: Mohawk Valley
- Frequency: 1490 kHz

Programming
- Format: News/Talk

Ownership
- Owner: Carol Whelley, Joseph Tesiero and John Tesiero, III; (Cranesville Block Company)

History
- First air date: 1948
- Call sign meaning: Community Service Station

Technical information
- Licensing authority: FCC
- Facility ID: 23456
- Class: C
- Power: 1,000 watts unlimited
- Transmitter coordinates: 42°57′40″N 74°10′35″W
- Translator: 106.9 W295CZ (Amsterdam)

Links
- Public license information: Public file; LMS
- Website: wcss1490.com

WCSS (1490 AM) is a commercial radio station broadcasting a news/talk format. Licensed to Amsterdam, New York, the station serves the Mohawk Valley, with radio studios in the Riverfront Center Mall in that city's downtown.

The station is owned by Carol Whelley, Joseph Tesiero, and John Tesiero, III, through licensee Cranesville Block Company, and features programming from Westwood One's Good Time Oldies Network and ABC Radio News. The station is part of the Buffalo Bills Radio Network and also carries a local swap-shop program.

WCSS is powered at 1,000 watts, non-directional. Programming is also heard on FM translator W295CZ at 106.9 MHz.

WCSS 1490 previously aired a full service oldies and classic hits radio format and currently simulcasts with WKAJ 1120 and its FM translator W250CX (97.9 FM) with a news/talk format.

== History ==
The station first signed on in 1948.

In August 2024, it was announced that Mariano and Wilhelmina Simms’ Simms Broadcasting will acquire Cranesville Block Company’s four stations and four translators in Upstate New York for $600,000. The stations included in the sale are: 96.5 WYVS Speculator, 930 WIZR/102.9 W275BS Johnstown and 104.3 W282CU Northville along with 1490 WCSS/106.9 W295CZ Amsterdam and 1120 WKAJ/97.9 W250CX Saint Johnsville.
