= South Glens Falls, New York =

South Glens Falls
- Village
- Village of South Glens Falls
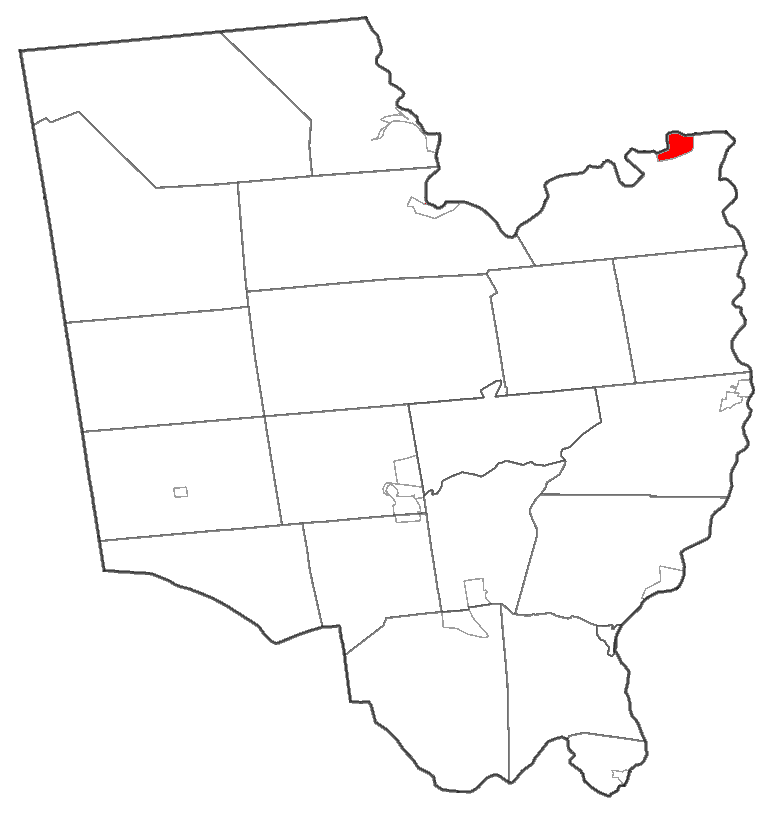
- Map highlighting South Glens Falls' location within Saratoga County.

- Location within the state of New York
- Coordinates: 43°17′47″N 73°38′3″W
- Country: United States
- State: New York
- County: Saratoga

Area
  - Total: 1.49 sq mi (3.86 km^{2})
  - Land: 1.36 sq mi (3.52 km^{2})
  - Water: 0.13 sq mi (0.34 km^{2})
- Elevation: 344 ft (105 m)

Population (2020)
  - Total: 3,744
  - Density: 2,756.1/sq mi (1,064.15/km^{2})
- Time zone: UTC-5 (Eastern (EST))
  - Summer (DST): UTC-4 (EDT)
- ZIP code: 12803
- Area code: 518
- FIPS code: 36-69078
- GNIS feature ID: 0970626
- Website: villageofsgfny.gov

South Glens Falls is a village in northern Saratoga County, New York, United States. The population was 3,744 at the 2020 census. The village is surrounded by Town of Moreau and separated from the City of Glens Falls by the Hudson River.

Cooper's Cave, shown on the village seal, is named after the author James Fenimore Cooper. Cooper was inspired to use the area as a location in his novel, The Last of the Mohicans, after visiting the area. The cave is within the bedrock of the Hudson River, but a viewing platform under the bridge between the village and Glens Falls allow visitors to see it from a unique vantage point.

== History ==
In the late woodland period, the area was considered to be the winter hunting grounds for the Mohawk and Algonquian tribes. Slowly, the area became attractive to settlement as good were transported through the "Great Carry" (now Route 9), between Glens Falls and Fort Edward.

In 1766, the Daniel Parks family was the first family to settle into the area after receiving 800 acres (3.2 km^{2}) of land, on which they built a house and a saw mill. By the mid-1830s, the settlement boasted saw mills, a grist mill, a cotton mill and a quarry as well as a dock to facilitate commerce.

The Village was formally incorporated in 1895 as a result of an effort to form a public water system.

The Historical Society of Moreau and South Glens Falls is housed in the Parks-Bentley House, added to the National Register of Historic Places in 1994.

== Education ==
South Glens Falls Central School District is registered by the New York State Department of Education and was chartered by the New York State Board of Regents in 1945. The district covers approximately 70 square miles (180 km^{2}), serving the towns of Moreau, Northumberland, and Wilton. It consists of four elementary schools (grades K-5), one middle school (grades 6-8) and one high school (grades 9-12). Total enrollment in the district is 3,350 students. Student-to-teacher ratio currently stands at 15:1, with more than half of the teaching staff having 20 years of classroom experience. Total per pupil costs are among the lowest in Saratoga County and is governed by a nine-member board of education.

=== Elementary schools ===
- Ballard Elementary School
- Harrison Avenue Elementary School
- Moreau Elementary School
- Tanglewood Elementary School

=== Middle school ===
- Oliver W. Winch Middle School·

=== High school ===
- South Glens Falls Senior High School

South Glens Falls Senior High School, locally known as South High, is the host of the annual South High Marathon Dance, where high school students raise money for families, individuals, or causes identified as in need.The dance spans 28 hours over the first Friday and Saturday in March. It features events such as raffles, themed hours, visits from elementary and middle schoolers, games, costume parties, and more. The whole community is interested, with visiting hours open both days. The inaugural event, in 1978, raised about $1500 for the local Emergency Squad. As of 2026, the Marathon Dance has raised a cumulative total of over $13 million for various organizations, individuals, and families. 2027's dance will mark the 50th anniversary of SHMD.

== Government and Public Services ==
The Village is governed by a Mayor and a four-person Village Board.

The Village is served by the South Glens Falls Police Department, the Moreau Emergency Squad, and the South Glens Falls Fire Company.

== Geography ==
The main intersection in South Glens Falls is located at 43°17′47″N 73°38′3″W (43.299155, -73.635361).

According to the United States Census Bureau, the village has a total area of 1.5 square miles (3.9 km^{2}), of which 1.4 square miles (3.6 km^{2}) is land and 0.1 square miles (0.26 km^{2}) (9.40%) is water.

The village is located on the south bank of the Hudson River and is off exit 17 of Interstate 87.

U.S. Route 9, New York State Route 32 and County Road 28, all north-south highways, converge in the village.

== Demographics ==
Historical population
Census	Pop.	Note	%±
1870	1,047		—
1880	1,083		3.4%
1890	1,606		48.3%
1900	2,025		26.1%
1910	2,247		11.0%
1920	2,158		−4.0%
1930	2,689		24.6%
1940	3,081		14.6%
1950	3,645		18.3%
1960	4,129		13.3%
1970	4,013		−2.8%
1980	3,714		−7.5%
1990	3,506		−5.6%
2000	3,368		−3.9%
2010	3,518		4.5%
2020	3,744		6.4%
U.S. Decennial Census

=== 2020 census ===
As of the 2020 census, South Glens Falls had a population of 3,744. The median age was 43.1 years; 18.4% of residents were under age 18, and 20.3% were age 65 or older. For every 100 females there were 94.3 males, and for every 100 females age 18 and over there were 91.8 males age 18 and over.

100.0% of residents lived in urban areas, while 0.0% lived in rural areas.

There were 1,744 households in South Glens Falls, including 856 families. Of those households, 23.2% had children under the age of 18 living in them. Of all households, 34.5% were married-couple households, 22.0% were households with a male householder and no spouse or partner present, and 32.5% were households with a female householder and no spouse or partner present. About 38.6% of all households were made up of individuals and 18.4% had someone living alone who was 65 years of age or older.

There were 1,852 housing units, of which 5.8% were vacant. The homeowner vacancy rate was 2.0% and the rental vacancy rate was 3.8%.

The population density was 2,496 inhabitants per square mile (964/km^{2}), and housing density was 1,234.67 per square mile (476.71/km^{2}).

Racial composition as of the 2020 census
Race	Number	Percent
White	3,392	90.6%
Black or African American	42	1.1%
American Indian and Alaska Native	9	0.2%
Asian	27	0.7%
Native Hawaiian and Other Pacific Islander	2	0.1%
Some other race	32	0.9%
Two or more races	240	6.4%
Hispanic or Latino (of any race)	87	2.3%

=== 2000 census ===
There were 1,523 households, out of which 25.0% had children under the age of 18 living with them, 40.9% were married couples living together, 12.1% had a female householder with no husband present, and 44.1% were non-families. 36.6% of all households were made up of individuals, and 17.3% had someone living alone who was 65 years of age or older. The average household size was 2.20 and the average family size was 2.90.

In the village, the population was spread out, with 21.7% under the age of 18, 8.3% from 18 to 24, 30.5% from 25 to 44, 21.8% from 45 to 64, and 17.7% who were 65 years of age or older. The median age was 38 years. For every 100 females, there were 87.3 males. For every 100 females age 18 and over, there were 85.2 males.

The median income for a household in the village was $31,623, and the median income for a family was $41,694. Males had a median income of $31,757 versus $24,046 for females. The per capita income for the village was $17,260. About 8.3% of families and 10.6% of the population were below the poverty line, including 10.9% of those under age 18 and 13.0% of those age 65 or over.
