= WQBK =

WQBK may refer to:

- WQBK-FM, a radio station (105.7 FM) licensed to Malta, New York, United States
- WPBZ-FM, a radio station (103.9 FM) licensed to Rensselaer, New York, United States, which held the call sign WQBK-FM from 1972 to 2019
- WGDJ, a radio station (1300 AM) licensed to Rensselaer, New York, which held the call sign WQBK from 1970 to 1997
