= List of New York Jets broadcasters =

The Jets' flagship radio station is WAXQ, 104.3 with "The Voice of the Jets," Bob Wischusen as the play-by-play announcer and former Jet Anthony Becht as the color analyst. Wischusen, who joined WABC in 1997, took over the play-by-play role in 2002 after Howard David left the organization earlier in the year. Lyons would join Wischusen the same year after the team began a re-evaluation of the broadcasting booth that would result in the surprising firing of Dave Jennings, "a smart and credible analyst," after fourteen years in the booth.

WABC, which served three separate stints as the Jets' radio flagship, simulcasted WEPN's coverage over its airwaves from 2002 until 2008. Jets radio broadcasts have also been carried over WCBS, which also served two stints as the Jets' flagship and last carried games over the air in 1992, and WFAN, which aired games from 1993 through 1999.

Any preseason games not nationally televised are shown on WCBS-TV. Ian Eagle, who was previously the radio voice of the Jets, calls the action on those telecasts. SportsNet New York, which serves as the home of the Jets, airs over 250 hours of "exclusive, in depth" material on the team in high definition.

Notable past play-by-play announcers for the Titans/Jets include the legends Howard Cosell, Bob Murphy, Merle Harmon, Marty Glickman and Howard David, who has called the Super Bowl and the NBA Finals for Westwood One and ESPN Radio.

== Broadcasters by year ==
Years	Flagship station	Play-by-play	Color commentator
1962	WABC	Bob Murphy	
1963	WHN	Bob Murphy	
1964–1965	WABC	Merle Harmon	Otto Graham
1966–1967	WABC	Merle Harmon	Dick Young
1968–1969	WABC	Merle Harmon	Sam DeLuca
1970–1972	WOR/WABC	Merle Harmon	Sam DeLuca
1973	WOR	Marty Glickman	Larry Grantham
1974–1978	WOR	Marty Glickman	Dave Herman
1979–1983	WCBS	Spencer Ross	Sam DeLuca
1984	WABC/WMCA	Spencer Ross	Sam DeLuca
1985	WABC/WMCA	Steve Albert	Sam DeLuca
1986	WABC/WMCA	Charley Steiner	Sam DeLuca
1987	WABC/WNBC	Charley Steiner	Randy Rasmussen
1988–1992	WCBS	Marty Glickman	Dave Jennings
1993–1996	WFAN/WXRK	Paul Olden	Dave Jennings
1997	WFAN/WXRK	Ian Eagle	Dave Jennings
1998–2001	WFAN/WABC/WEPN	Howard David	Dave Jennings
2002–2008	WABC/WEPN	Bob Wischusen	Marty Lyons
2008–2023	WEPN/WEPN-FM	Bob Wischusen	Marty Lyons
2024–present	WAXQ	Bob Wischusen	Anthony Becht

Spanish language stations

- WADO (2000–2011)
- WEPN (2012–2018)
- WADO / WQBU (2019)

Spanish language announcers

- Clemson Smith Muñiz (2000–present; play-by-play)
- Oscar Benítez (2000–2019; color analyst)
- Roberto Abramowitz (2020; color analyst)

== Radio affiliates ==
=== New York ===
City	Call sign	Frequency
Conklin	WKGB-FM	92.5 FM
New Paltz	WBWZ	93.3 FM
New York City	WAXQ	104.3 FM
Rochester	WHTK	1280 AM
Albany	WOFX	980 AM
Albany	WTRY	98.3 FM

=== Former affiliates (22 stations) ===
New York

- WROW/590: Albany
- WPTR/1540: Albany
- WGNA-FM/107.7: Albany
- WLIR-FM/107.1: Hampton Bays
- WQBK-FM/105.7: Malta
- WTMM-FM/104.5: Mechanicville
- WFAN/660: New York City
- WOR/710: New York City
- WABC/770: New York City
- WCBS/880: New York City
- WEPN/1050: New York City
- WEPN-FM/98.7: New York City
- WRCN-FM/103.9: Riverhead
- WRNY/1350: Rome
- WGY/810: Schenectady
- WOFX/980: Troy
- WTLB/1310: Utica

New Jersey

- WADB/1310: Asbury Park
- WNJE/1040: Flemington
- WCHR-FM/105.7: Manahawkin
- WMTR/1250: Morristown

California

- KSPN/710: Los Angeles
