= WTMM =

WTMM may refer to:

- WTMM-FM, a radio station (104.5 FM) licensed to Mechanicville, New York, United States
- WGDJ, a radio station (1300 AM) licensed to Rensselaer, New York, United States, which used the call sign WTMM from August 1997 to January 2007 and from August 2007 to February 2008
- Wavelet transform modulus maxima method, a method for detecting fractal dimension of a signal or time-series
