= Q103 =

Q103 may refer to one of the following:

- Quran 103, the 103rd chapter of the Islamic Holy book
- Q103 (New York City bus)

== Radio station ==
- CKQQ-FM, a hot adult contemporary radio station formerly known as Q103 in Kelowna, British Columbia, Canada
- Heart Cambridge, a radio station formerly known as Q103 in Cambridge, England, United Kingdom
- KOAQ (FM), a Top 40 radio station in Denver, Colorado, USA, formerly known as Q103 from 1974 until January 1989.
- KQCR-FM, a Top 40 radio stations in Cedar Rapids, Iowa, USA, formerly known as Q103 from 1975 until 1995.
- WPBZ-FM, a radio station formerly known as Q103 in Rensselaer, New York, United States
- WQSH (FM), a former simulcast of WPBZ-FM in Cobleskill, New York, United States
- WQQQ, a radio station formerly known as Q103 in Sharon, Connecticut, United States
