= Brookfield, Wisconsin =

City in Waukesha County, Wisconsin, U.S.

- City
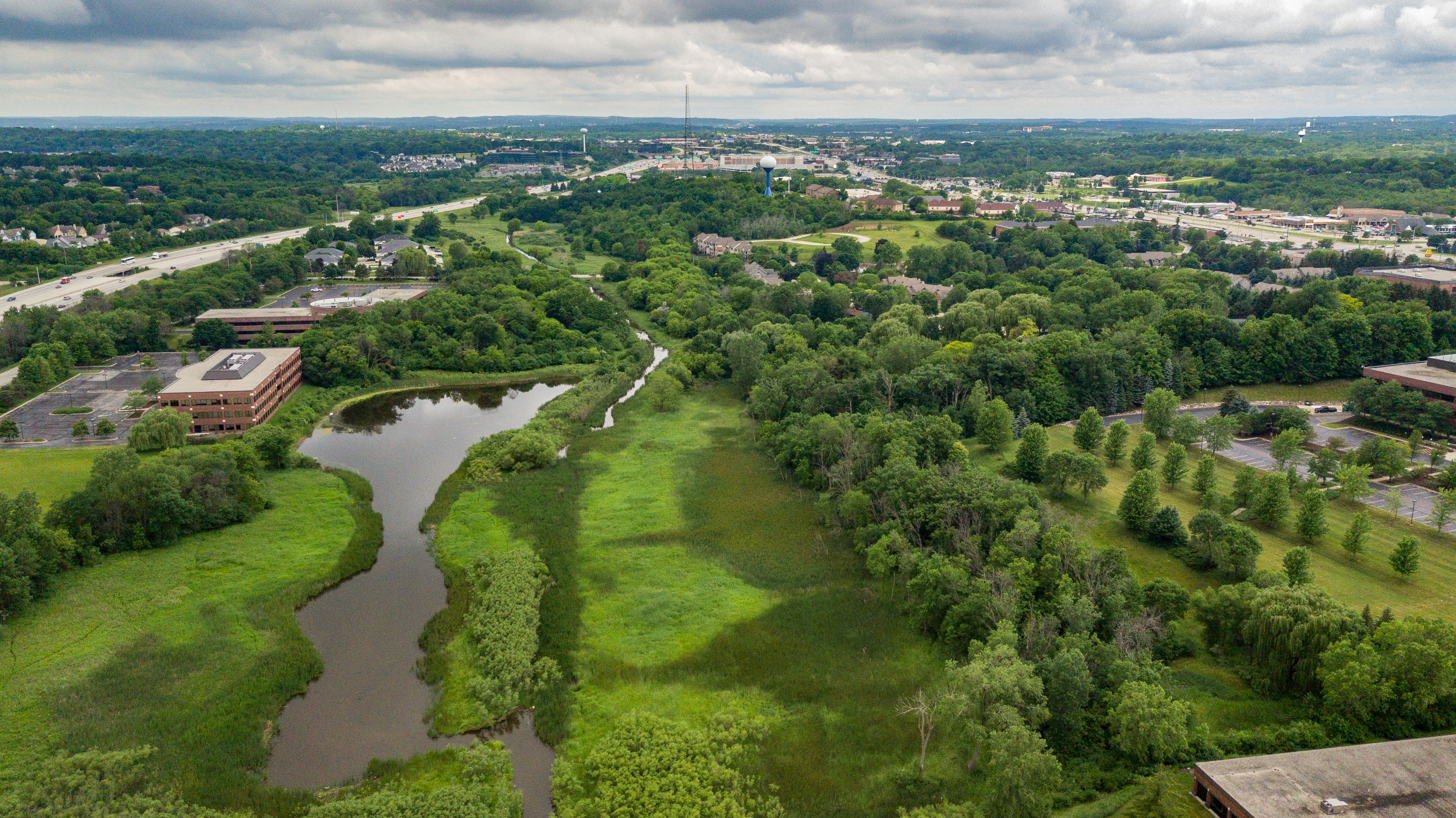
- Brookfield Office Park

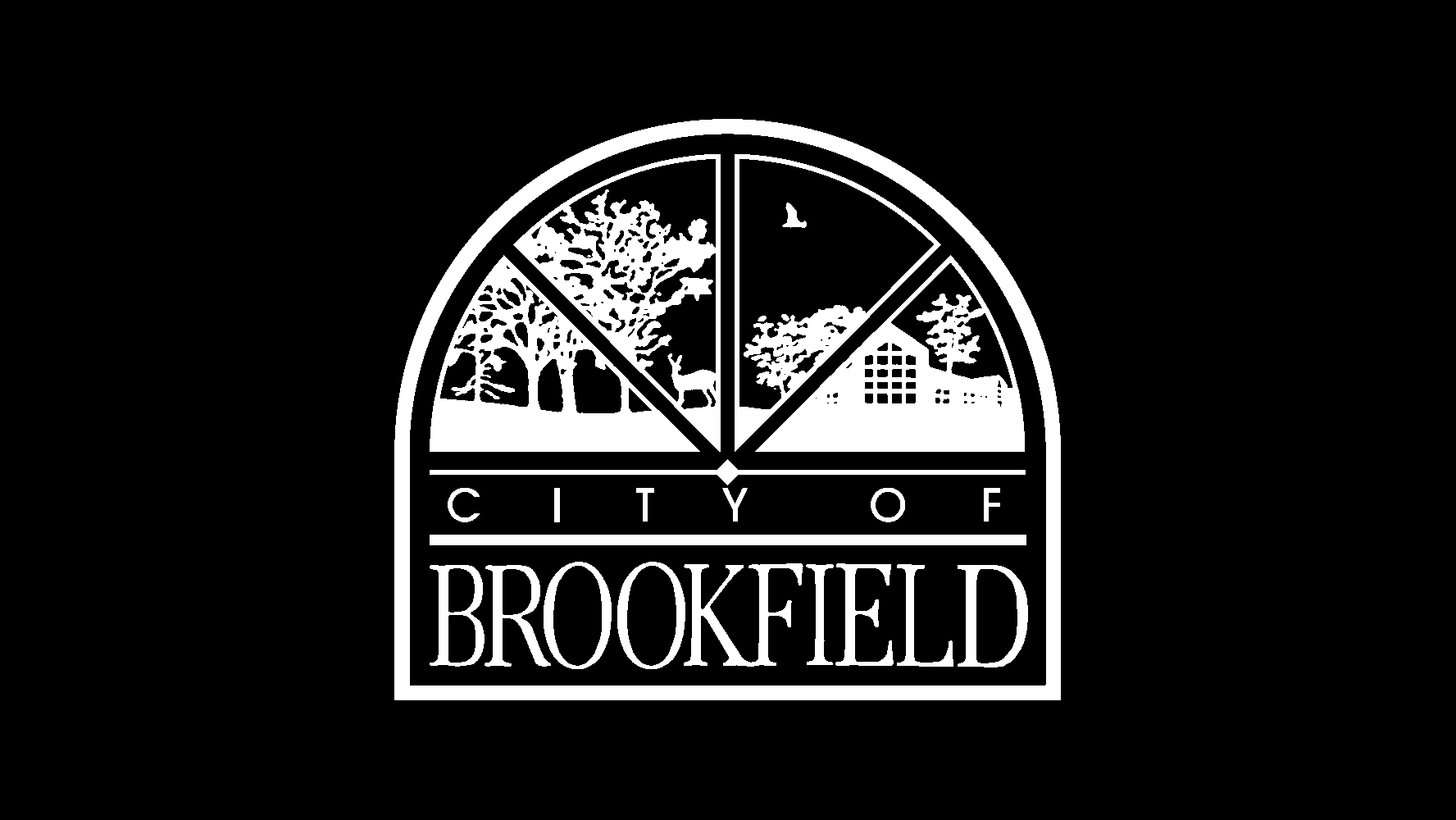
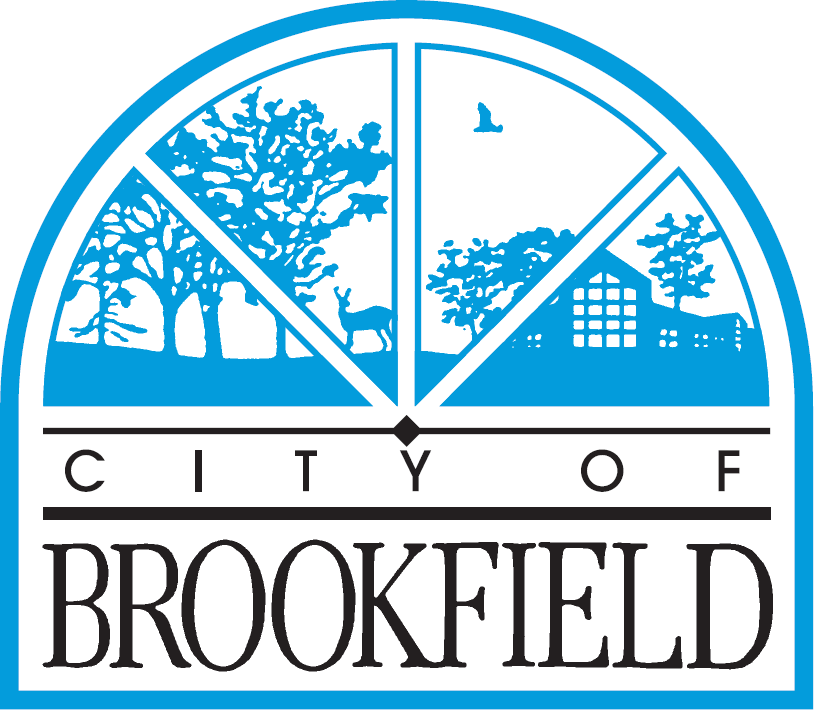
- Flag Seal
- Motto(s): Minutes from Milwaukee, Miles from Expected
- Interactive map of Brookfield, Wisconsin
- Location within Wisconsin
- Coordinates: 43.0643°N 88.1178°W
- Country: United States
- State: Wisconsin
- County: Waukesha
- Incorporated: August 14, 1954

Government
  - Type: Mayor–Council
  - Mayor: Steven V. Ponto

Area
  - City: 27.719 sq mi (71.792 km^{2})
  - Land: 27.352 sq mi (70.841 km^{2})
  - Water: 0.367 sq mi (0.950 km^{2}) 1.32%
- Elevation: 830 ft (253 m)

Population (2020)
  - City: 41,464
  - Estimate (2025): 41,448
  - Rank: US: 997th WI: 16th
  - Density: 1,515.9/sq mi (585.31/km^{2})
  - Urban: 1,306,795 (US: 38th)
  - Metro: 1,575,010 (US: 41st)
- Time zone: UTC–6 (Central (CST))
  - Summer (DST): UTC–5 (CDT)
- ZIP Codes: 53005, 53008, 53045, 53072
- Area code: 262
- FIPS code: 55-10025
- GNIS feature ID: 1582867
- Website: ci.brookfield.wi.us

Brookfield is a city in eastern Waukesha County, Wisconsin, United States. The population was 41,464 as of the 2020 census, and was estimated at 41,448 in 2025.

The city is adjacent to the Town of Brookfield and is part of the Milwaukee metropolitan area.

== History ==
Brookfield is west of Milwaukee in Waukesha County in an area originally inhabited by Potawatomi Indians. The first white settler, William Howe, arrived in 1820 with a Presidential Land Grant giving him title to the area. Soon after, Robert Curren bought a claim in 1836 and established a tavern and inn.

In May 1838, Jacques View Jr., with a large party of white settlers, led the local Potawatomi west. Caroline Quiner, the mother of Laura Ingalls Wilder, was born in a cabin in 1839 in what is now the City of Brookfield, near the current intersection of Brookfield Road and Davidson Road. By 1839, the population needed a schoolhouse, as the 1840 census showed a population of 148. In these 1840s, George Gebhardt started trading with the surrounding Potawatomi and Menominee neighbors. In 1843, Brookfield's first church, St. Dominic, was built by the Irish Catholic congregation. In 1848, the first telegraph lines were laid through Brookfield, towards Waukesha. Communication was made easier due to this. In 1849, cholera reached Brookfield, and one Laura Grover recalls, "The death-like stillness was appalling; nothing was seen but the death carts rolling round the streets gathering the recent dead... I believe there were fifty deaths from cholera that day." The same year, 64 Brookfield residents voted in favor of giving suffrage to black residents, and 0 the other way. In 1850, cholera again went through Brookfield, and according to one Earl Thayer, "The cholera returned... more terrible than the year before. People literally died walking along the streets. Official reports put the toll at over 300."

In 1850, the Milwaukee and Mississippi Railroad (now the Canadian Pacific Rail) built a railroad through the town, which in 1853 erected a depot, forming the Brookfield Junction. In the year 1850, the Town of Brookfield had 1,944 inhabitants and in land area covered 36 square miles. The town slowly grew over following years, with the economy being mostly agricultural, with Brookfield Junction serving as a commercial center for the surrounding farms. The Civil War had little effect on this town, despite the severe losses of members serving from the state. "More than 12,000 died: 3,802 were killed in action or died of wounds and 8,499 died from disease, exposure, and other causes." In 1867, a second rail depot was constructed, which still stands.

In the 1900s, Brookfield gained a new reputation. Waukesha County was called Cow County, U.S.A., as according to advertisers, they claimed that in the county there were more cows than people. This was, of course, fantastical, although there were cows. This did help cement Wisconsin's dairy reputation. The Spanish flu, killed many people in the area, but not as many as cholera had in the past. On May 31, 1914, a tornado hit, devastating the farmers and the rural area.

Al Capone became a notorious resident, as he established an area to live and a distillery on Brookfield Road where Capone Court is today. In 1928, the first suburban development, Kinsey's Garvendale, a residential subdivision, was created. Early subdivisions grew slowly due to the Great Depression hitting a year later, affecting its growth and killing demand.

Development in Brookfield began to increase after the Second World War. Suburban development was encouraged by a scarcity of urban area housing, the baby boom, and government sponsored building programs, which further grew the town, and after several annexations of neighboring communities, an incorporation drive started. The City of Brookfield was incorporated from the town of Brookfield, a portion of which still survives along the city's western edge, on August 14, 1954. The first mayor was Franklin Wirth, and he oversaw the new city, which at the time had a population of 7,900 and covered an area of 17.5 square miles. Much of the land was still in agricultural use, so the city's founders encouraged orderly development of office and industrial areas to cause the community to function with strong industrial and commercial base.

Today, Brookfield covers over 27 square miles, with a population of over 40,000 residents.

== Geography ==
According to the United States Census Bureau, the city has an area of 27.719 square miles (71.79 km^{2}), of which 27.352 square miles (70.84 km^{2}) is land and 0.367 square miles (0.95 km^{2}) (1.32%) is water.

The sub-continental divide passes through Brookfield; on the eastern side of this divide, easily marked by the crest at Calhoun Road and Capitol Drive, water flows to Lake Michigan on its way to the Gulf of Saint Lawrence; on the western side of this divide, water flows to the Fox River of Illinois and Wisconsin on its way to the Mississippi River and the Gulf of Mexico.

There is a heron rookery on a site northwest of Capitol Drive and Brookfield Road.

== Climate ==
The Köppen-Geiger climate classification system classifies its climate as humid continental (Dfa).

Climate data for Brookfield, Wisconsin (1981–2010 normals)
Month	Jan	Feb	Mar	Apr	May	Jun	Jul	Aug	Sep	Oct	Nov	Dec	Year
Record high °F (°C)	62 (17)	66 (19)	82 (28)	91 (33)	101 (38)	101 (38)	109 (43)	102 (39)	101 (38)	88 (31)	78 (26)	68 (20)	109 (43)
Mean daily maximum °F (°C)	27.8 (−2.3)	31.9 (−0.1)	43.1 (6.2)	56.4 (13.6)	67.8 (19.9)	78.0 (25.6)	81.9 (27.7)	79.9 (26.6)	72.7 (22.6)	59.8 (15.4)	45.4 (7.4)	31.5 (−0.3)	56.4 (13.6)
Mean daily minimum °F (°C)	10.7 (−11.8)	14.4 (−9.8)	23.5 (−4.7)	35.0 (1.7)	45.0 (7.2)	54.8 (12.7)	59.8 (15.4)	58.6 (14.8)	49.8 (9.9)	38.3 (3.5)	27.7 (−2.4)	15.4 (−9.2)	36.1 (2.3)
Record low °F (°C)	−29 (−34)	−28 (−33)	−14 (−26)	7 (−14)	25 (−4)	29 (−2)	41 (5)	35 (2)	25 (−4)	7 (−14)	−9 (−23)	−28 (−33)	−29 (−34)
Average precipitation inches (mm)	1.45 (37)	1.42 (36)	1.78 (45)	3.39 (86)	3.49 (89)	4.36 (111)	3.85 (98)	4.58 (116)	3.39 (86)	2.61 (66)	2.48 (63)	1.81 (46)	34.61 (879)
Average snowfall inches (cm)	12.3 (31)	8.6 (22)	5.6 (14)	1.8 (4.6)	0 (0)	0 (0)	0 (0)	0 (0)	0 (0)	0.1 (0.25)	1.6 (4.1)	10.1 (26)	40.0 (102)
Average precipitation days (≥ 0.01 in)	9.2	7.5	7.9	10.7	11.8	10.7	9.4	9.1	8.8	9.4	8.8	9.5	112.8
Average snowy days (≥ 0.1 in)	6.8	5.1	3.5	1.0	0	0	0	0	0	0.1	1.1	6.2	23.8
Source: National Oceanic and Atmospheric Administration

== Demographics ==
Historical population
Census	Pop.	Note	%±
1960	19,812		—
1970	31,761		60.3%
1980	34,035		7.2%
1990	35,184		3.4%
2000	38,649		9.8%
2010	37,920		−1.9%
2020	41,464		9.3%
2025 (est.)	41,448		0.0%
U.S. Decennial Census; 2020 Census

According to realtor website Zillow, the average price of a home as of July 31, 2026, in Brookfield was $533,966.

As of the 2024 American Community Survey, there were 16,127 estimated households in Brookfield with an average of 2.53 persons per household. The city has a median household income of $129,548. Approximately 3.2% of the city's population lives at or below the poverty line. Brookfield has an estimated 61.2% employment rate, with 64.3% of the population holding a bachelor's degree or higher and 98.1% holding a high school diploma. There were 16,654 housing units at an average density of 608.88 per square mile (235.09/km^{2}).

The top five reported languages (people were allowed to report up to two languages, thus the figures will generally add to more than 100%) were English (86.0%), Spanish (1.7%), Indo-European (5.0%), Asian and Pacific Islander (6.5%), and Other (0.8%).

The median age in the city was 43.8 years.

Brookfield, Wisconsin – racial and ethnic composition Note: the US Census treats Hispanic/Latino as an ethnic category. This table excludes Latinos from the racial categories and assigns them to a separate category. Hispanics/Latinos may be of any race.
Race / ethnicity (NH = non-Hispanic)	Pop 1990	Pop 2000	Pop 2010	Pop 2020	% 1990	% 2000	% 2010	% 2020
White alone (NH)	33,880	36,051	33,522	32,821	96.29%	93.28%	88.40%	79.16%
Black or African American alone (NH)	134	316	456	756	0.38%	0.82%	1.20%	1.82%
Native American or Alaska Native alone (NH)	49	34	51	58	0.14%	0.09%	0.13%	0.14%
Asian alone (NH)	859	1,477	2,531	4,749	2.44%	3.82%	6.67%	11.45%
Pacific Islander alone (NH)	—	7	16	9	—	0.02%	0.04%	0.02%
Other race alone (NH)	2	31	41	158	0.01%	0.08%	0.11%	0.38%
Mixed race or multiracial (NH)	—	280	450	1,460	—	0.72%	1.19%	3.52%
Hispanic or Latino (any race)	260	453	853	1,453	0.74%	1.17%	2.25%	3.50%
Total	35,184	38,649	37,920	41,464	100.00%	100.00%	100.00%	100.00%

=== 2020 census ===
As of the 2020 census, there were 41,464 people, 15,733 households, and 11,725 families residing in the city. The population density was 1,518.38 inhabitants per square mile (586.25/km^{2}). There were 16,392 housing units at an average density of 600.26 per square mile (231.76/km^{2}). The racial makeup of the city was 80.19% White, 1.86% African American, 0.17% Native American, 11.47% Asian, 0.02% Pacific Islander, 0.87% from some other races and 5.43% from two or more races. Hispanic or Latino people of any race were 3.50% of the population.

=== 2010 census ===
As of the 2010 census, there were 37,920 people, 14,576 households, and 10,999 families residing in the city. The population density was 1,399.78 inhabitants per square mile (540.46/km^{2}). There were 15,317 housing units at an average density of 565.41 per square mile (218.31/km^{2}). The racial makeup of the city was 89.96% White, 1.21% African American, 0.17% Native American, 6.69% Asian, 0.04% Pacific Islander, 0.50% from some other races and 1.42% from two or more races. Hispanic or Latino people of any race were 2.25% of the population.

There were 14,576 households, of which 31.5% had children under the age of 18 living with them, 67.4% were married couples living together, 5.4% had a female householder with no husband present, 2.6% had a male householder with no wife present, and 24.5% were non-families. 21.4% of all households were made up of individuals, and 11.9% had someone living alone who was 65 years of age or older. The average household size was 2.57 and the average family size was 3.01.

The median age in the city was 46.7 years. 23.5% of residents were under the age of 18; 5.2% were between the ages of 18 and 24; 18.5% were from 25 to 44; 33% were from 45 to 64; and 19.9% were 65 years of age or older. The gender makeup of the city was 48.5% male and 51.5% female.

=== 2000 census ===
As of the 2000 census, there were 38,649 people, 13,891 households, and 11,223 families residing in the city. The population density was 1,421.06 inhabitants per square mile (548.67/km^{2}). There were 14,208 housing units at an average density of 522.41 per square mile (201.70/km^{2}). The racial makeup of the city was 94.20% White, 0.83% African American, 0.09% Native American, 3.83% Asian, 0.02% Pacific Islander, 0.23% from some other races and 0.81% from two or more races. Hispanic or Latino people of any race were 1.17% of the population.

There were 13,891 households, out of which 36.1 percent had children under age 18 living with them, 73.1 percent were married couples living together, 5.5 percent had a female householder with no husband present, and 19.2 percent were non-families. 16.7 percent of all households were made up of individuals, and 9.0 percent had someone living alone who was 65 years old or older. The average household size was 2.74 people and the average family size was 3.09 people.

In the city, the population was spread out, with 26.8 percent under age 18, 4.6 percent from 18 years old to 24 years old, 23.2 percent from 25 years old to 44 years old, 27.8 percent from 45 years old to 64 years old, and 17.6 percent who were 65 years old or older. The median age was 42 years. For every 100 females, there were 93.7 males. For every 100 females age 18 and over, there were 90.8 males.

The median income for a household in the city was $76,225, and the median income for a family was $83,691. Males had a median income of $62,351 versus $37,589 for females. The per capita income for the city was $37,292. 2.2 percent of the population and 1.4 percent of families were below the poverty line. Out of the total population, 2.4 percent of those under age 18 and 3.4 percent of those 65 years old and older were living below the poverty line.

== Economy ==
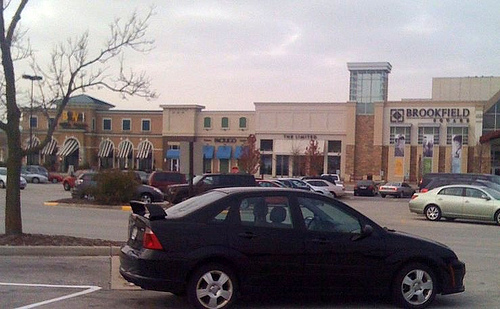
Brookfield Square, 2011

Fiserv is headquartered in Brookfield. The firm provides financial services technology (software, for the most part) for banks, thrifts, credit unions, securities broker dealers, leasing and finance companies, and retailers, among others. Its 2016 revenue was approximately $5.5 billion.

Fedex's SmartPost business unit is also headquartered in Brookfield.

== Arts and culture ==
Brookfield's concert hall is the Sharon Lynne Wilson Center for the Arts located in Mitchell Park. Brookfield's main beach is located at Fox Brook Park.

Brookfield Square is the main shopping mall for the city and also serves as a commercial anchor to the Bluemound Road shopping district serving the western suburbs of Milwaukee and Waukesha County. Brookfield has off-road bike paths throughout the city.

Brookfield Days is held annually in June, at Wirth Park.

The Elmbrook Historical Society hosts celebrating the lives of early Brookfield settlers, including Caroline Ingalls, who was born in the Brookfield area.

== Government ==
Brookfield has a mayor–council government. The mayor is elected to a four-year term. On April 1, 2014, incumbent mayor Steve Ponto again defeated former two-term Mayor Jeff Speaker by a vote of 4,512 to 2,539. On April 3, 2018, incumbent mayor Steve Ponto ran unopposed for mayor.

Brookfield is represented by Scott Fitzgerald (R) in the United States House of Representatives, and by Ron Johnson (R) and Tammy Baldwin (D) in the United States Senate. Brookfield is represented by Rob Hutton (R) in the Wisconsin State Senate and Robyn Beckley Vining (D) in the Wisconsin State Assembly.

The Common Council is composed of 14 aldermen, with two representing each of seven districts. They serve four-year terms, with one member from each district up for election every other year. The aldermen set policy and have extensive financial control, but are not engaged in daily operational management.

== Education ==
The Elmbrook School District serves residents of Brookfield excluding a small section of southwest Brookfield, which is in the Waukesha School District. Private schools include St. Dominic Catholic School, St. John Vianney Catholic Church, Brookfield Christian School, and Brookfield Academy. Private high schools located within the Brookfield city limits include Brookfield Academy. The Elmbrook (Brookfield) School District is the #1 Public School District in the state.

== Transportation ==
Capitol Airport is Brookfield's public use airport and serves the city and surrounding communities.

Brookfield was served by a station on the main line between Milwaukee and Watertown serving intercity and commuter trains.

== Notable people ==
- Noel Jenke, former NFL Player who lived in Brookfield
- John Anderson, NFL player
- Ken Anderson, pro wrestler known as Mr. Kennedy
- Al Capone, noted Chicago mobster, owned a Brookfield home where moonshine was made
- Bill Carollo, NFL official
- Kip Carpenter, 2002, 2006 Olympian, bronze medalist in speedskating
- Henry J. Clasen, Wisconsin state representative and businessman
- Tom Dougherty, MLB player
- Arpad Elo, inventor of Elo rating system for chess, professor at Marquette
- Susan Engeleiter, former administrator of the Small Business Administration
- Herman Finger, entrepreneurial lumberman
- Aubrey Foard, Charlotte Symphony Orchestra principal tuba
- Troy Grosenick, ice hockey goaltender for the Nashville Predators
- Doc Hamann, MLB player
- Merle Harmon, Hall of Fame broadcaster and entrepreneur
- Kenny Harrison, world champion track and field athlete, Olympic gold medalist
- Nathan Hatch (1757–1847), soldier in American Revolutionary War and War of 1812; farmed in Brookfield from 1842 to 1847 and interred in Brookfield's Oak Hill Cemetery
- Caroline Ingalls (1839–1924), born in what is today the city of Brookfield (then Town of Brookfield), mother of Laura Ingalls Wilder
- Ken Jungels, MLB player
- Ted Kanavas (1961–2017), Wisconsin State Senate
- Matt Katula, NFL player
- Joe Kuether, professional poker player
- Vuk Latinovich, soccer player
- Robert Andrew "Bob" Long, wide receiver for Green Bay Packers during Vince Lombardi era
- Arie Luyendyk, two-time Indianapolis 500 winner
- Eddie Mathews, baseball player (lived in Brookfield during career)
- Al McGuire, former NCAA basketball coach and commentator (lived in Brookfield toward the end of his life)
- Fritz Mollwitz, MLB player
- Zane Navratil, pickleball player
- Brad Nortman, NFL punter
- Joel Rechlicz, NHL hockey player
- Leslie Osborne, member of Women's Professional Soccer team Boston Breakers and the U.S. national team
- Joe Panos, football player for Philadelphia Eagles, Buffalo Bills
- James Kerr Proudfit, U.S. Army general
- Martin P. Robinson, puppeteer for Telly Monster, Mr. Snuffleupagus and Slimey on Sesame Street since 1980; graduate of Brookfield East High School
- Herman Schatz, Wisconsin state representative and blacksmith
- Molly Seidel, 2020 Tokyo Olympic Bronze Medal marathon winner
- Richie Sexson, retired MLB player (lived here when he played for Milwaukee Brewers)
- Paul Spaeth, noted composer and musician
- Adam Stockhausen, Oscar-winning production designer
- John Patten Story, U.S. Army major general
- Joe Thomas, Hall of Fame offensive tackle
- Frank Urban, Wisconsin State Assembly
- John M. Young, Wisconsin State Assembly

== Sister cities ==
Brookfield has one sister city:

- Seligenstadt, Hesse, Germany

== See also ==
- 2012 Azana Spa shooting
- 2005 Living Church of God shooting
- Milwaukee Electric Tool Corporation
