= District of Berlin =

District of Berlin may refer to:

- Boroughs and quarters of Berlin, Germany, referred to as districts for certain purposes
- Berlin Historic District (Berlin, Nevada), United States
- United States Court for Berlin, referred to in some sources as the District of Berlin

== See also ==
- Berlin (disambiguation)
- School District of New Berlin, Wisconsin, United States
