= WPBZ =

WPBZ may refer to:

- WPBZ-FM, a radio station (103.9 FM) licensed to Rensselaer, New York, United States
- WIRK, a radio station (103.1 FM) licensed to Indiantown, Florida, United States, which held the call sign WPBZ from 1994 to 2012
