= WGNA-FM =

Country music radio station in Albany, New York, United States

- Albany, New York; United States
- Broadcast area: Capital District
- Frequency: 107.7 MHz (HD Radio)
- Branding: 107.7 GNA

Programming
- Format: Country music
- Subchannels: HD2: Simulcast of WJIV (Christian); HD3: Sound of Life (Christian)
- Affiliations: Compass Media Networks; Westwood One

Ownership
- Owner: Townsquare Media; (Townsquare Media of Albany, Inc.)
- Sister stations: WPBZ-FM; WQBK-FM; WQSH; WTMM-FM

History
- First air date: December 5, 1973
- Former call signs: WGNA (1972–1988)
- Call sign meaning: "Good News Albany" (tag of aborted launch format)

Technical information
- Licensing authority: FCC
- Facility ID: 72118
- Class: B
- ERP: 12,500 watts
- HAAT: 300 meters (980 ft)
- Transmitter coordinates: 42°38′13.2″N 73°59′49.4″W
- Translator: See Sound of Life Radio § Translators

Links
- Public license information: Public file; LMS
- Webcast: Listen live
- Website: wgna.com

WGNA-FM (107.7 MHz) is a commercial radio station licensed to Albany, New York, and serving the Capital District. The station is owned by Townsquare Media and broadcasts a country music format.

WGNA-FM has an effective radiated power (ERP) of 12,500 watts. Its transmitter is in the Helderberg Escarpment tower farm in New Scotland. WGNA holds the distinction of having the longest unchanged format (in terms of commercial stations) in the Capital District, having been a country music station since its launch in November 1973, and being one of two commercial Albany FM radio stations to have never changed their call sign, with 92.3 WFLY as the other.

== History ==
=== Christian radio ===
WGNA originally was not slated to take the country format it has long dominated. The 107.7 frequency had been awarded to the owners of Christian radio station WHAZ. WGNA was due to sign on with an alternate Christian format. WHAZ would concentrate on Christian talk and teaching, while the FM station would play Christian music. The GNA in the call sign would stand for "Good News Albany".

These plans went on hold when WHAZ's owner died several weeks prior to the planned sign-on of WGNA. In a pinch, his children took over the station. The station signed on with a country music format on December 5, 1973, at 6:00 p.m.

=== Country radio ===
For its first five days, the country music played uninterrupted. On December 10 at 6:00 a.m., disc jockeys began hosting the country sound. Going against established country station WOKO, WGNA became a success, even though not all radios could receive FM signals in that era. WHAZ was eventually sold off and, in 1978, WOKO left the country format. In 1988, then-WGNA owner Barnstable Broadcasting purchased WOKO and turned it into an AM simulcast of WGNA (with the FM taking the WGNA-FM call sign as a result). WGNA 1460 AM would occasionally break away from the simulcast for sports coverage.

In 1990, noted Albany broadcaster Fred Horton became program director at WGNA. He led the station to become #1 in almost every Arbitron ratings book. On April 13, 1994, Barnstable sold WGNA to the radio group headed by TV host Merv Griffin. Griffin's group later sold its stations to Capstar Broadcasting in 1996. Two years later, the WGNA stations ended up as part of AMFM, Inc., a forerunner to today's iHeartMedia.

=== Change in program directors ===
In 1997, longtime program director Fred Horton left the station to program WYNY in New York City and was replaced by former MTV executive, Ronald E. "Buzz" Brindle, who programmed Country 107.7 until April 2007. Brindle had previously programmed WGY and had launched WYJB "B95.5" in the Albany market.

Under Brindle's leadership, WGNA broadened its listener base by replacing its country-focused morning show with the more mass appeal "Sean & Richie Show" in order to attract non-country fans from WFLY, WPYX, and WYJB and then convert them into country listeners. During Brindle's 10-year tenure at WGNA, the station strengthened its reputation within the country music industry and garnered several CMA awards and nominations.

=== New ownership ===
After AMFM merged with Clear Channel Communications in 2000, WGNA-AM-FM was sold with WPYX, WABT, WTRY (AM) and WTRY-FM to Clear Channel Communications which, in turn, sold WGNA-AM-FM, WABT, WQBK-FM, WTMM and WQBJ to Regent Communications (now Townsquare Media) due to market concentration concerns. The Federal Communications Commission does not want one company to dominate too large a portion of a radio market.

In February 2002, the simulcast with 1460 AM ended when Regent sold that station to ABC Radio. ABC used it to bring its Radio Disney format to the Capital Region under the call letters WDDY. It now broadcasts Catholic religious programming as WOPG.

== Personalities ==
WGNA has enjoyed a fairly stable air staff, as most of WGNA's on-air talent have been a part of the Country 107.7 team for more than 10 years, including:

- Sean McMaster and Richie Phillips of the "Sean & Richie" morning show
- "Brother" Lou Roberts of the nightly show "Cryin', Lovin', or Leavin'"
- John Stanley on Saturday middays. John also holds the distinction of being with WGNA continuously since 1974

Notable departures from the on-air staff include:

- Former midday host and music director Bill Earley in April 2007 after having been with the station for 19 years
- Former midday host Kevin Richards in July 2014 after having also been with the station for 19 years

Recent additions to the on-air staff include:

- Bethany to the "Sean & Richie" morning show in September 2013, after a successful 5-year stint co-hosting the morning show on WPIG in Olean, New York
- Heather Davis in October 2014 to fill the midday position

== Recognition and influence ==
At the time of its launch, WGNA was one of the first FM country music stations in the Northeast and with its powerful signal was able to reach and even rate in markets far from the Capital District where country music was either nonexistent or on low-power AM stations. As Baby Boomers who grew up with Rock and Pop in the Northeast moved into their mid-30s and early 40s, bought homes in the suburbs and raised families, they discovered that they could relate to the stories told in country music. It was not just for people who grew up on farms and in rural areas. Country music stations in Glens Falls, Utica, the Hudson Valley and even Springfield, Massachusetts, owe some debt to WGNA's success and/or influence in those areas.

Nationally, WGNA has been a nominee several times for the "Medium Market Station of the Year" award at both the Country Music Association Awards and by the Academy of Country Music. R.E. "Buzz" Brindle was nominated in 2005 for Radio & Records's "Country Program Director Of The Year" award. In terms of air talent, afternoon personality Kevin Richards was the winner of the CMA's 2006 Medium Market Personality of the Year award. As well as morning show hosts, Sean McMaster and Richie Phillips winning the CMA Personality of the year award in 2000, and a couple New York State Broadcasters Awards for Personality of the year.

WGNA-FM has been the #1 station (12+, 25-54 adults) in most ratings trends and books in the Albany market though WGY, WFLY, WRVE, WPYX and WYJB have all unseated WGNA from this position on various occasions. Despite attempts by competitors, such as WCDA/WPTR-FM (96.3 FM) in the mid-to-late 1990s, Galaxy Communications' WEGQ (93.7 The Eagle) from 2004 to 2005, Pamal's simulcast of WFFG-FM (Froggy 107.1) on its Albany 104.9 FM signal in 2005, and most recently, Pamal's second attempt at a country format (also on 104.9 FM and later moving to WKLI-FM 100.9, as The Cat), WGNA-FM has faced little significant direct competition on the country music front.

During the late summer and fall months, WGNA-FM formerly aired New York Jets football games during conflicts when WTMM-FM was playing a New York Yankees game until the 2018 season, when New York Jets conflicts moved to WQSH; prior to the 2011 season however, WGNA-FM was the main home for the New York Jets.

== CountryFest ==
Every year, most recently at the Altamont Fairgrounds in Altamont, WGNA hosts a major festival known as the WGNA CountryFest which attracts a crowd of nearly 30,000 country music fans. Previous CountryFests have been at the Saratoga Race Course in Saratoga Springs.

| Year | Performed |
|---|---|
| 2004 | Brad Paisley, Craig Morgan, Keith Urban, Sherrié Austin, Terri Clark |
| 2005 | Miranda Lambert, Dierks Bentley, Trace Adkins, Montgomery Gentry |
| 2006 | Gary Allan, Blake Shelton, Neal McCoy, Josh Gracin, Jamie O'Neal, Keith Anderson |
| 2007 | Bucky Covington, Jason Michael Carroll, Darryl Worley, Joe Nichols, Josh Turner |
| 2008 | Trisha Yearwood, Phil Vassar, Billy Currington, Eric Church, James Otto, Ashton Shepherd, The Back 40 band |
| 2009 | Montgomery Gentry, Jason Michael Carroll, Heidi Newfield, The Lost Trailers, Sarah Buxton |
| 2010 | Blake Shelton, Jason Michael Carroll, Gretchen Wilson, Chuck Wicks, David Nail, The JaneDear girls |
| 2011 | Miranda Lambert, Randy Houser, John Michael Montgomery, Sunny Sweeney, Brett Eldredge, Joanna Smith |

== HD Radio operations ==
WGNA-FM has been licensed for HD Radio operations since 2006, operating HD-2 and HD-3 sub-channels. The HD-3 sub-channel is leased to the Sound of Life Radio Christian radio network for their translator, W235AY.

Broadcast translator for WGNA-FM-HD3
| Call sign | Frequency | City of license | FID | ERP (W) | HAAT | Class | Transmitter coordinates | FCC info |
|---|---|---|---|---|---|---|---|---|
| W235AY | 94.9 FM | Albany, New York | 60892 | 250 | 274.3 m (900 ft) | D | 42°38′13.3″N 73°59′49.5″W | LMS |
