= Calhoun, Wisconsin =

Human settlement in Waukesha County, Wisconsin, United States

- Neighborhood
- Location within Wisconsin
- Coordinates: 43°00′48″N 88°07′37″W
- Country: United States
- State: Wisconsin
- County: Waukesha
- City: New Berlin

Calhoun is a neighborhood of New Berlin, Waukesha County, Wisconsin, United States.

== History ==
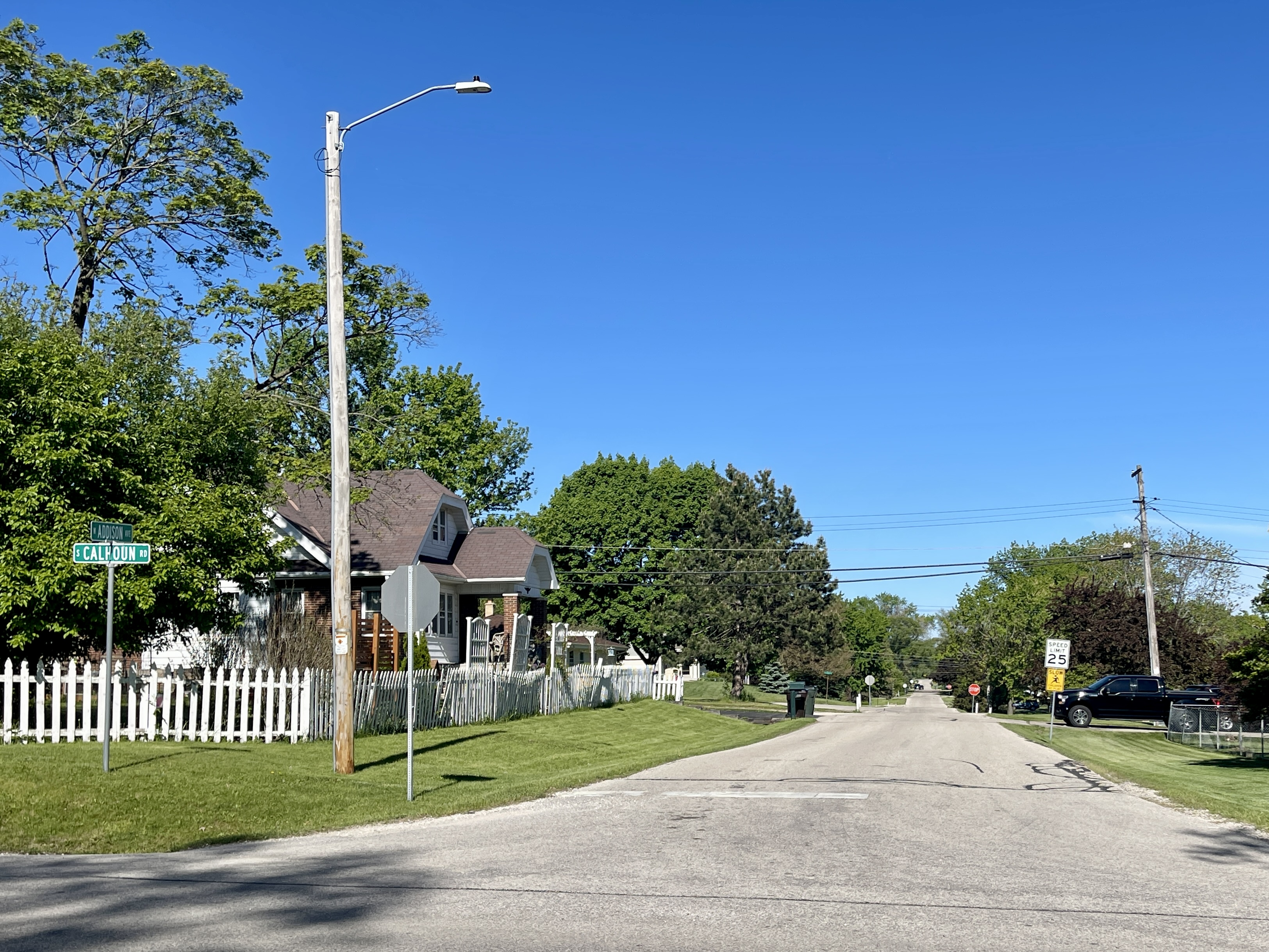
Calhoun, Wisconsin in 2025

A post office was established as Calhoun in 1882, and remained in operation until it was discontinued in 1918. The community was named for George Edward Calhoun, the original owner of the town site.
