= New Berlin, Wisconsin =

City in Wisconsin

- City
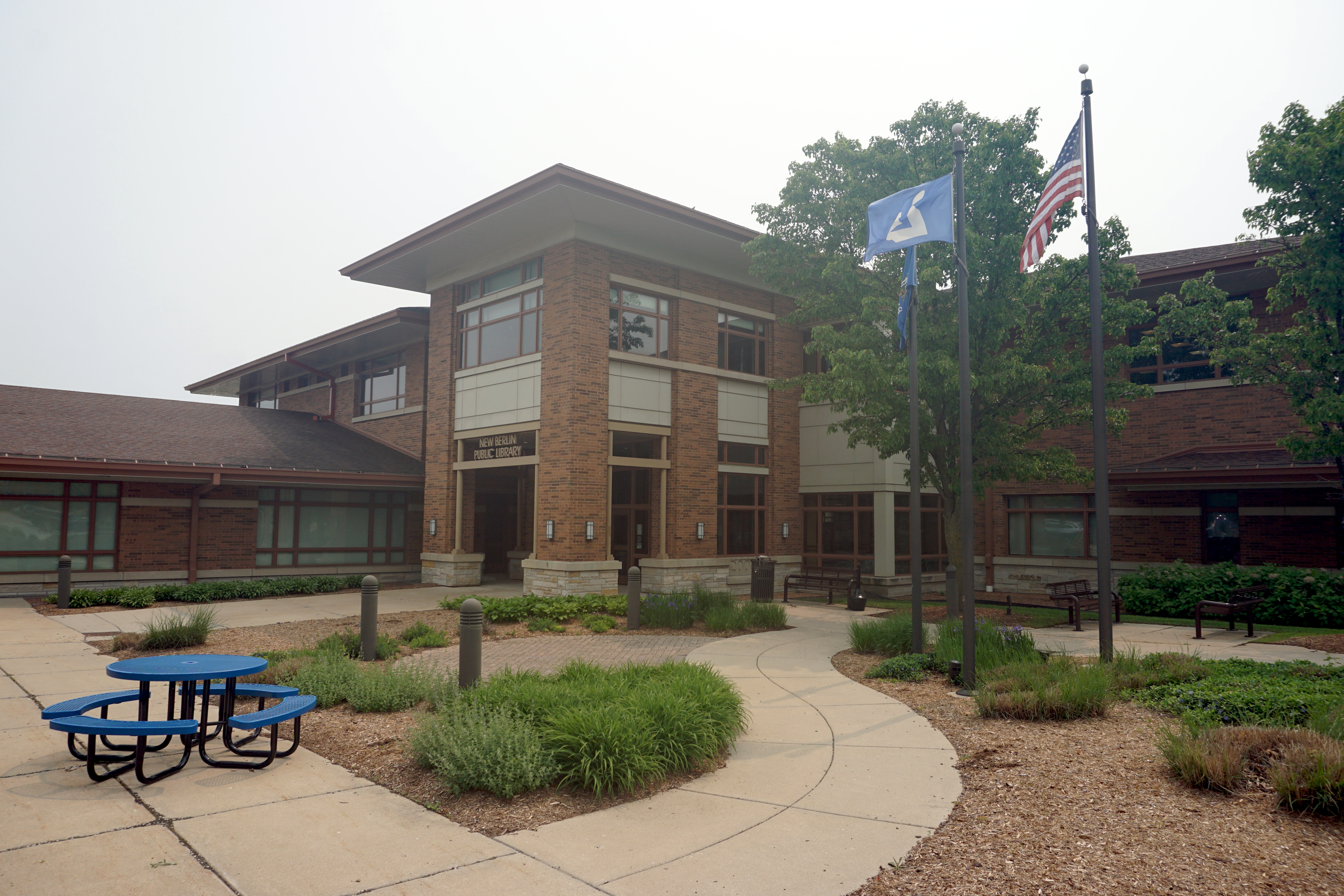
- New Berlin Public Library

- Flag
- Interactive map of New Berlin, Wisconsin
- Location within Wisconsin Location within the United States
- Coordinates: 42°58′45″N 88°6′33″W
- Country: United States
- State: Wisconsin
- County: Waukesha
- Founded: January 13, 1840
- Incorporated: 1959

Government
  - Mayor: David Ament

Area
  - Total: 36.88 sq mi (95.51 km^{2})
  - Land: 36.44 sq mi (94.38 km^{2})
  - Water: 0.44 sq mi (1.13 km^{2}) 1.17%
- Elevation: 922 ft (281 m)

Population (2020)
  - Total: 40,451
  - Density: 1,089.2/sq mi (420.55/km^{2})
- Time zone: UTC−6 (Central)
  - Summer (DST): UTC−5 (Central)
- ZIP Codes: 53146, 53151
- Area code: 262
- FIPS code: 55-56375
- GNIS feature ID: 1570202
- Website: https://www.newberlinwi.gov/

New Berlin (/nuːˈbɜːrlɪn/) is a city in eastern Waukesha County, Wisconsin, United States. The population was 40,451 at the 2020 census. It is part of the Milwaukee metropolitan area.

== Pronunciation ==
Area residents put the accent on the first syllable of Berlin (/nuːˈbɜːrlɪn/), rather than the second.

== History ==
The first settlers, Sidney Evans and P.G. Harrington, arrived in the northeastern part of what is now New Berlin in 1836. The area first came under local government in 1838 as part of the Town of Muskego, which at the time was composed of New Berlin and Muskego. The area that is now New Berlin was separated from Muskego in 1839 and named the Town of Mentor.

On January 13, 1840, Mentor became New Berlin. It was named by Evans after his hometown, New Berlin, New York. The town remained a rural and agricultural area until the 1940s, when the westward migration to the suburbs from Milwaukee began. Between 1850 and 1950, New Berlin's population went from 1,293 to 5,334. Ten years later, in 1960, the population had nearly tripled to 15,788. The Town of New Berlin became the City of New Berlin with its incorporation in 1959.

Large-scale growth occurred in the 1960s and 1970s, mainly as a result of the construction of the New Berlin Industrial Park, which began in 1964. The park comprises three separate business parks encompassing 1,126 acres (4.6 km^{2}), including Moorland Road Industrial Park, New Berlin Industrial Park and MSI/Lincoln Avenue Industrial Park.

The School District of New Berlin's school board voted to close Glen Park Elementary School in 2012. This resulted in around 300 students being transferred to either Elmwood, Ronald Reagan, or Orchard Lane elementary schools before the Fall term in 2012. In 2015, the building began functioning as a middle and high school for Heritage Christian Schools, which had acquired the property in 2014. Heritage Christian Schools was originally established in 1973 under the name Bethel Christian Academy, operating in affiliation with the Bethel Baptist Church. In 1975, the institution restructured as a non-denominational K–8 school and adopted the name Heritage Christian Schools. Over time, the school expanded its educational offerings to include high school programs.

Interstate 43 was expanded at the Moorland Road exit to accommodate a growing number of commuters. The new interchange has a two-lane roundabout that has been the center of a great deal of controversy because of the high number of accidents and traffic backups on 43. In 2023, an oil spill occurred at an auto repair shop and entered the city's stormwater system, a retention pond, and a creek. The city spent tens of thousands of dollars on cleanup efforts.

== Geography ==
New Berlin is located at 42°58′45″N 88°6′33″W (42.979063, −88.109188). It straddles the Sub-Continental Divide, which runs north–south through the eastern part of the city. Nearly 27 square miles (70 km^{2}) in the western part of the city, or about 73% of the city's total land area, is west of the Sub-Continental Divide in the Fox River watershed, which is part of the Mississippi River watershed. The remaining area is within the Great Lakes/St. Lawrence River drainage basin.

According to the United States Census Bureau, the city has a total area of 36.87 square miles (95.49 km^{2}), of which 36.44 square miles (94.38 km^{2}) is land and 0.43 square miles (1.11 km^{2}) is water. Michael Joseph Gross of GQ said that "On the map, New Berlin forms a neat six-by-six-mile square in the southeast corner of Waukesha County". Calhoun and Prospect are populated places within the city of New Berlin.

=== Climate ===
New Berlin

Climate chart (precipitation, max. and min. temperature)
| J | F | M | A | M | J | J | A | S | O | N | D |
| 102 −8 −12 | 96 −3 −11 | 69 9 −6 | 160 19 4 | 102 23 8 | 148 28 14 | 95 30 17 | 105 27 17 | 70 25 13 | 95 16 7 | 66 10 0 | 79 −2 −9 |
- █ Average max. and min. temperatures in °C
- █ Precipitation totals in mm
Imperial conversion
| J | F | M | A | M | J | J | A | S | O | N | D |
| 4 18 10 | 3.8 27 12 | 2.7 48 21 | 6.3 66 39 | 4 73 46 | 5.8 82 57 | 3.7 86 63 | 4.1 81 63 | 2.8 77 55 | 3.7 61 45 | 2.6 50 32 | 3.1 28 16 |
- █ Average max. and min. temperatures in °F
- █ Precipitation totals in inches

== Demographics ==
Historical population
| Census | Pop. | Note | %± |
|---|---|---|---|
| 1960 | 15,788 | | — |
| 1970 | 26,910 | | 70.4% |
| 1980 | 30,529 | | 13.4% |
| 1990 | 33,592 | | 10.0% |
| 2000 | 38,193 | | 13.7% |
| 2010 | 39,584 | | 3.6% |
| 2020 | 40,451 | | 2.2% |
U.S. Decennial Census

=== 2020 census ===
As of the 2020 census, New Berlin had a population of 40,451. The median age was 46.8 years. 19.6% of residents were under the age of 18 and 22.7% of residents were 65 years of age or older. For every 100 females there were 94.1 males, and for every 100 females age 18 and over there were 91.8 males age 18 and over.

92.1% of residents lived in urban areas, while 7.9% lived in rural areas.

There were 17,058 households in New Berlin, of which 25.7% had children under the age of 18 living in them. Of all households, 57.2% were married-couple households, 14.6% were households with a male householder and no spouse or partner present, and 22.8% were households with a female householder and no spouse or partner present. About 27.2% of all households were made up of individuals and 14.0% had someone living alone who was 65 years of age or older.

There were 17,634 housing units, of which 3.3% were vacant. The homeowner vacancy rate was 0.5% and the rental vacancy rate was 4.6%.

Racial composition as of the 2020 census
| Race | Number | Percent |
|---|---|---|
| White | 35,451 | 87.6% |
| Black or African American | 512 | 1.3% |
| American Indian and Alaska Native | 129 | 0.3% |
| Asian | 1,916 | 4.7% |
| Native Hawaiian and Other Pacific Islander | 13 | 0.0% |
| Some other race | 427 | 1.1% |
| Two or more races | 2,003 | 5.0% |
| Hispanic or Latino (of any race) | 1,826 | 4.5% |

=== 2010 census ===
As of the census of 2010, there were 39,584 people, 16,292 households, and 11,327 families residing in the city. The population density was 1,086.2 people per square mile (400.6/km^{2}). There were 14,921 housing units at an average density of 405.0 per square mile (156.4/km^{2}). The racial makeup of the city was 93.4% White, 0.7% African American, 0.3% Native American, 3.8% Asian, 0.6% from other races, and 1.1% from two or more races. Hispanic or Latino of any race were 2.6% of the population.

There were 16,292 households, of which 26.7% had children under the age of 18 living with them, 60.7% were married couples living together, 5.8% had a female householder with no husband present, and 30.5% were non-families. 25.2% of all households were made up of individuals, and 11.2% had someone living alone who was 65 years of age or older. The average household size was 2.42 and the average family size was 2.92.

In the city, the population was spread out, with 21.3% under the age of 18, 6.2% from 18 to 24, 22.5% from 25 to 44, 33% from 45 to 64, and 16.9% who were 65 years of age or older. The median age was 44.9 years. For every 100 females, there were 94.6 males. For every 100 females age 18 and over, there were 92.3 males.

=== Non-decennial estimates ===
The median income for a household in the city was $73,688, and the median income for a family was $90,659. Males had a median income of $42,008 versus $33,329 for females. The per capita income for the city was $36,609. About 2.1% of families and 3.0% of the population were below the poverty line, including 2.9% of those under age 18 and 4.6% of those age 65 or over.

As of 2009 most New Berlin residents were middle class professionals. Some of them are descendants of area farming families. Others originated from white flight from Milwaukee in the 1960s and 1970s.

== Economy ==
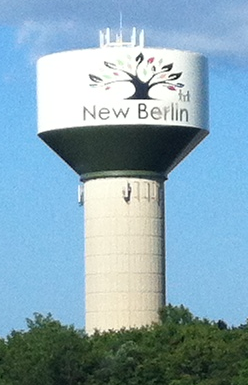
Municipal water tower

According to the city's 2017 Comprehensive Annual Financial Report, the largest employers in the city are:

| # | Employer | # of employees |
|---|---|---|
| 1 | ABB Industrial Systems | 750 |
| 2 | ACS Group | 700 |
| 3 | Ideal Mechanical | 550 |
| 4 | EMTEQ | 400 |
| 5 | GMR Marketing | 400 |
| 6 | Modern Maintenance Building Services | 400 |
| 7 | Collins Aerospace | 300 |
| 8 | Spring City Electric | 300 |
| 9 | Dematic | 250 |
| 10 | Gortite div. of Dynatect | 250 |

== Recreation ==
New Berlin has 26 parks totaling approximately 855 acres (3.5 km^{2}), of which 372 acres (1.5 km^{2}) are developed parks, 107 acres (0.4 km^{2}) are preserved as conservancy, 187 acres (0.8 km^{2}) are the New Berlin Hills Golf Course, and 199 acres (0.8 km^{2}) are in various states of development. Facilities include playing fields at Malone Park, near New Berlin's City Hall, and a disc golf course at Valley View Park, in the southeastern part of the city.

== Government ==
The eight-member Common Council consists of seven aldermen, representing each of the city's seven aldermanic districts, and the mayor. The mayor is elected to serve a term of four years; aldermen are elected to serve a term of three years. The mayor of New Berlin is David Ament. The Common Council adopts the city budget and passes laws, policies and regulations that govern the city.

== Education ==
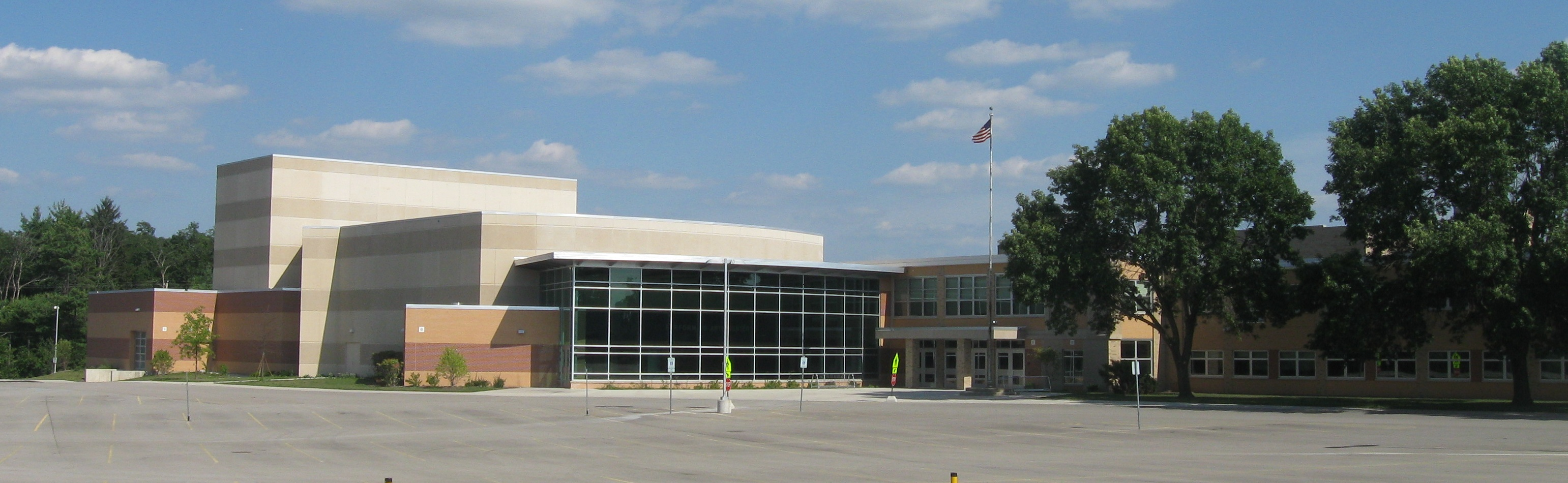
New Berlin West Middle/High School

Schools in the School District of New Berlin are:

- New Berlin Eisenhower Middle/High School
- New Berlin West Middle/High School
- Elmwood Elementary
- Orchard Lane Elementary
- Poplar Creek Elementary
- Ronald Reagan Elementary

There are three private elementary (K4–8) schools in New Berlin:

- Heritage Christian Schools
- Star of Bethlehem Lutheran School
- Holy Apostles Elementary School

== Infrastructure ==
The Utility Service Area is supplied with water from Lake Michigan, which is purchased from the Milwaukee Water Works. In the eastern portion of the city, wastewater is returned to Lake Michigan via the Milwaukee Metropolitan Sewerage District sewer system. The western portions of the city, outside of the Utility Service Area, use groundwater/private wells as their water supply source. Four municipal wells act in a reserve capacity. The groundwater acquired from these wells is found in two distinct shallow water bearing geologic formations, or aquifers. The water from these aquifers is radium compliant.

New Berlin is located mainly north of Interstate 43 on the latter's course from Beloit to Milwaukee and Green Bay, and south of Interstate 94 between Waukesha and Milwaukee. WIS 59 runs through the northern border of the city as Greenfield Avenue. Other major roads include Moorland Road, and National Avenue (old WIS 15). The Union Pacific line between Milwaukee and Waukesha runs through New Berlin. The line once had passenger service until the 1950s and extended to Lancaster.

== Notable people ==
- Tom Berte, racing driver
- T. J. Bray, basketball player, played professionally in Europe
- Meghan Coffey, Miss Wisconsin 2006
- Glenn Robert Davis, the only US Congressman native to Waukesha County
- Marc C. Duff, Wisconsin State Representative
- Alvarus E. Gilbert, Wisconsin State Representative and farmer
- George M. Humphrey, Wisconsin State Representative
- Benjamin Hunkins, pioneer and Wisconsin territorial and state legislator
- Robert Hastings Hunkins, pioneer and Vermont state legislator
- Julie Goskowicz Koons, speed skater
- C. E. McIntosh, Wisconsin State Representative and lawyer
- Terry Ratzmann, mass murderer
- John C. Schober, Wisconsin State Representative and lawyer
