= Oak Hill Cemetery Brookfield =

Cemetery in Brookfield, Wisconsin

Coordinates: 43°04′59″N 88°08′43″W

Oak Hill Cemetery
- Interactive map of Oak Hill Cemetery

Details
- Established: 1851
- Location: Brookfield, Wisconsin

Oak Hill Cemetery is a small cemetery located on Brookfield Road in Brookfield, Wisconsin, founded in 1851 as a part of pioneer Joseph Ewbank's land grant. Since 1905, it has been operated by the Oak Hill Cemetery Association. The cemetery is home to many graves of American, British, and German settlers along with a number of American Military veterans of various wars. A Memorial Day ceremony is held each year at Oak Hill. This is a very well-kept cemetery on lovely, wooded land.

== Burials ==
Nathan Hatch, an American Revolutionary War veteran, is buried in Oak Hill. Hatch was born on November 16, 1757, in Attleboro, Massachusetts, and enlisted in the Continental Army in July 1776 under Captain Isaac Hodge's Company as a Private. He was later discharged in 1780. In 1843, Hatch and the extended family moved from western New York state to the Wisconsin Territory. Arriving by steamboat across the Great Lakes, they settled in what is now Brookfield with his family and two sons, Nathan Jr. and Edmund. Hatch died on November 10, 1847.
