= New Berlin West Middle/High School =

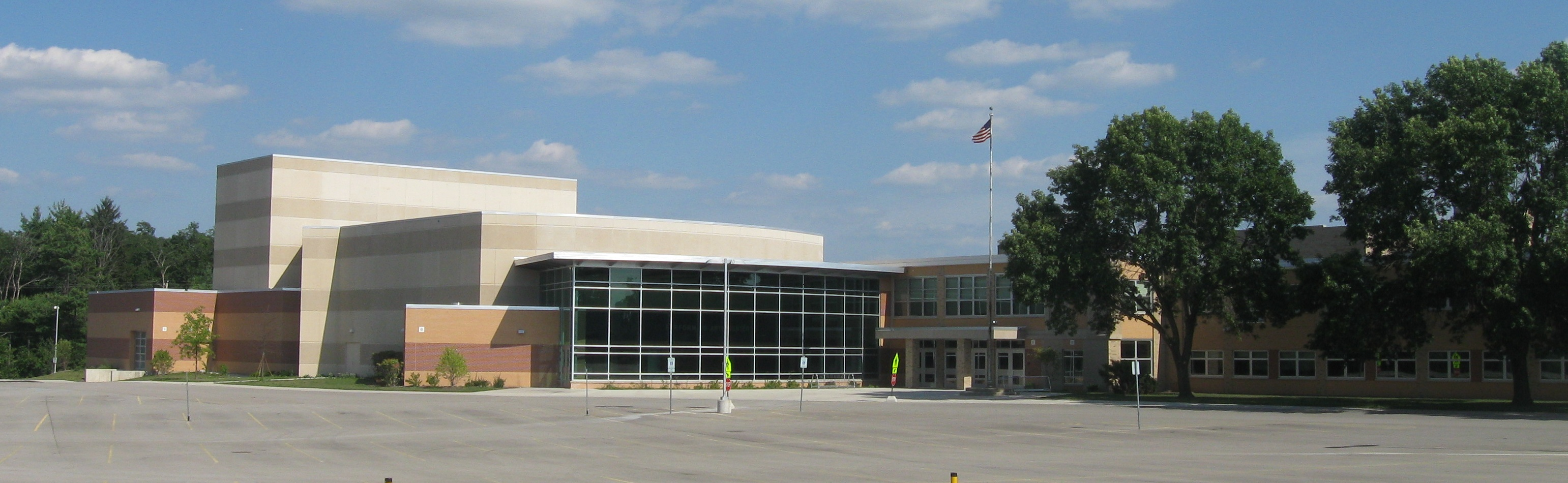

Location
- 18695 W. Cleveland Avenue; New Berlin, Waukesha, Wisconsin 53146; United States; 42.989862°N 88.146260°W

Information
- Type: Public school
- Established: 1961
- School district: School District of New Berlin
- Superintendent: Joe Garza
- Principal: Mark Otto
- Teaching staff: 68.19 (FTE)
- Grades: 7–12
- Student to teacher ratio: 15.08
- Hours in school day: 7:25 am – 2:40 pm
- Campus type: Suburban
- Colors: Blue and Gold
- Fight song: New Berlin West Fight Song (modification of MSU Fight Song)
- Athletics conference: Woodland
- Mascot: Vern the Viking
- Nickname: NBW
- Team name: Vikings
- Rival: New Berlin Eisenhower Middle/High School
- Newspaper: Norse Code
- Yearbook: Witan
- Website: www.nbexcellence.org/schools/west

New Berlin West Middle/High School is a public middle/high school located in New Berlin, Wisconsin. It is a part of the School District of New Berlin. The school serves grades 7 through 12. The school colors are blue and gold, and the school mascot is the Viking.

From 2001 through 2007, the school underwent major construction, including a new theater, a new fieldhouse with an indoor track and tennis courts, an upgraded and relocated library, and a new 10-classroom wing. Renovations were also made to the bathrooms and workout facilities. The class of 2007 was the first to host graduation in the new fieldhouse.

== Athletics ==
West has a rivalry with the other New Berlin public high school, Eisenhower.

New Berlin West's 2010 baseball team made it to the state tournament for the first time. The school's 2013 baseball team won the state tournament for the first time.

=== Conference affiliation history ===
- Braveland Conference (1962–1963)
- Parkland Conference (1963–1997)
- Woodland Conference (1997–present)

== State championships ==
- 1984 – Girls' volleyball
- 2000 – Boys' basketball
- 2013 – Boys' baseball
- 2016 – Girls' softball
- 2018 – Pom and Dance (Hip Hop)
- 2023 – Cheer and Stunt
- 2024 – Pom and Dance (Hip Hop)

== 2018 antisemitism allegations ==
In 2018, New Berlin West halted its yearbook distribution after the school learned that a senior student chose a yearbook quote referring to the Holocaust. His quote read, "There will always be one true Final Solution." A spokesman of the Milwaukee Jewish Federation was on record as finding the quote "very disturbing and upsetting".
