= New Berlin Eisenhower Middle/High School =

Eisenhower Middle/High School

Location
- 4333 S. Sunnyslope Rd. New Berlin, Waukesha, Wisconsin 53151; United States; 42.964065°N 88.090981°W

Information
- School type: Public school, middle school/high school
- Established: 1969
- Status: Open, school hours 7:25AM-2:40PM
- School district: School District of New Berlin
- Authority: Joe Garza
- Superintendent: Joe Garza
- Principal: Matthew Buckley
- Associate principal: Kristine Springer; Andrew Gerlach
- Head of school: Joe Garza
- Teaching staff: 65.80 (FTE)
- Grades: 7–12
- Gender: Co-ed
- Age range: 12–18
- Enrollment: 1,048 (2023–2024)
- Student to teacher ratio: 16.45
- Language: English
- Hours in school day: 8 Hours, 15 Minutes (7:25–2:40)
- Campus type: Suburban
- Colors: Purple and gold
- Athletics conference: Woodland Conference
- Mascot: Lion
- Nickname: Ike
- Team name: Lions
- Rival: New Berlin West High School
- Website: nbexcellence.org/schools/eisenhower/

New Berlin Eisenhower Middle/High School is a combination middle school and high school located in New Berlin, Wisconsin, United States. Part of the School District of New Berlin, the school serves grades 7 through 12. The school was nationally recognized as a Blue Ribbon School in 2005.

Locals refer to the school as "Ike."

== History ==
Eisenhower opened in September 1969, although construction of the building was not complete until the spring of 1970. The school opened with 400 9th and 10th grade students from New Berlin West.

On April 29, 1999 approximately 800 students from Eisenhower High School and Eisenhower Middle School staged a walkout, protesting the New Berlin Public School Board's $1.6 billion proposed budget cuts. The cuts included eliminating elective course options such as home economics and eliminating several teaching positions. Although students skipped class for the walkout from 9:30 am until early in the afternoon, many Eisenhower teachers supported the protest, and administration did not punish students for truancy.

== Athletics ==
Eisenhower High School was a member of the Parkland Conference from 1970 to 1997. It has been a member of the Woodland Conference since 1997. The school has a cross-town rivalry with the city's other middle/high school, New Berlin West. In 1995, Eisenhower won its first state championship in any sport by defeating Ashland in the Division 3 State Football Championship game. The school successfully defended its championship in 1996, by defeating Spooner for the state title.

The boys' basketball team won the Division 2 state championship on March 8, 2008 with a 54-41 win over Adams-Friendship High School. The girls' softball team also won the Division 2 State Championship in 2008. The girls' basketball team won the Division 2 State Title in 2010. The Eisenhower girls returned to state in 2012 undefeated ranked second in the state into the championship game at 27-0, but fell short to #1 and undefeated New London 39-43. The girls also made it to the state championship in 2013, before losing to Notre Dame 33-42.

In 2008 the varsity boys' basketball team and the varsity girls' volleyball team won the state championships.

=== State championships ===
- 1988 - Cheerleading
- 1993 - Cheerleading
- 1994 - Cheerleading
- 1995 - Football
- 1996 - Football
- 1997 - Cheerleading
- 1998 - Cheerleading
- 1999 - Cheerleading
- 2001 - Academic Decathlon
- 2002 - Academic Decathlon
- 2003 - Cheerleading
- 2004 - Academic Decathlon
- 2005 - Cheerleading
- 2006 - Academic Decathlon
- 2007 - Cheerleading
- 2008 - Boys' basketball
- 2008 - Girls' softball
- 2009 - Academic Decathlon
- 2009 - Boys' volleyball
- 2010 - Academic Decathlon
- 2010 - Girls' basketball
- 2010 - Table tennis
- 2011 - Academic Decathlon
- 2011 - Cheerleading
- 2012 - Academic Decathlon
- 2013 - Academic Decathlon
- 2013 - Cheerleading
- 2016 - Girls' basketball
- 2016 - Science Bowl
- 2017 - Dance (Pom)
- 2020 - Science Bowl
- 2020 - Dance (Pom)
- 2020 - Dance (Jazz)
- 2021 - Lake Sturgeon Bowl
- 2021 - Dance (Pom)
- 2021 - Dance (Jazz)
- 2021 - Cheerleading
- 2022 - Dance (Pom)
- 2022 - Dance (Jazz)
- 2022 - Girls' Soccer
- 2022 - Boys' Soccer
- 2025 - Baseball

=== National championships ===
- 2013 - Academic Decathlon
- 2016 - Science Bowl

=== Conference affiliation history ===
- Parkland Conference (1970-1997)
- Woodland Conference (1997–present)

== Notable alumni ==
- Mike Hart, former professional baseball player
- Alex McRae, former professional baseball player
