= Howard David =

American sportscaster

Howard David is an American sportscaster.

== Biography ==
Over the years, David has been the radio play-by-play man for several pro sports teams including the NBA's New Jersey Nets, Milwaukee Bucks and Boston Celtics and the NFL's New York Jets and Miami Dolphins. He also had stints with the New York Cosmos soccer team and as the voice of Princeton University basketball and football.

=== Mizlou Television Network, CBS Radio/Westwood One ===
Howard David was discovered by Mizlou Television Network President Bill Schwing while working as a morning DJ in Trenton, New Jersey. He soon became the top announcer for Mizlou, covering more than 300 sporting events including major college football bowl games, NIT basketball, NASL soccer and college bowling.

David also worked for the CBS Radio (later Westwood One) network as lead play-by-play voice for its Sunday Night Football coverage until 1995, when he was promoted by CBS Radio to take Jack Buck's place on the network's Monday Night Football broadcasts. In 1998, David added a second full-time position when he joined WFAN (also a CBS property) to become the play-by-play voice for the New York Jets after Ian Eagle became a part of CBS television's return to NFL coverage.

David's Jets assignment took precedence over his Westwood One duties, requiring a substitute when the Jets would play on Monday night or in the playoffs. One prime example of this came on Conference Championship weekend in 1999. At the time, CBS would send the Monday night crew to cover the NFC Championship Game, which featured Falcons and the Vikings in Minneapolis. However, the Jets had also advanced to championship weekend and were to take on the Broncos in Denver later that afternoon. David followed the Jets' broadcast team to Denver while John Rooney, one of the network's secondary announcers, called the NFC title game alongside Matt Millen.

At the end of the 1999 season, the Jets returned to their long-time radio home at WABC and David followed the team there while keeping his contract with Westwood One. Following Super Bowl XXXVI, David left the Jets and departed Westwood One to take a job in Miami, where he served as the Miami Dolphins' radio voice on WQAM and also hosted a talk show, known as Moe Howard David on the station. Moe's favorite catchphrase: “Doy Doy Doy” was a favorite among the stations listeners. His contract was not renewed after the 2004 season, as he and analyst Jim Mandich were fired by new coach Nick Saban. After his assignments ended, David returned to national broadcasts, becoming one of SportsUSA's NFL voices. He called games for that network until 2008.

=== Recent assignments ===
David became one of Westwood One's NFL voices, having replaced Bill Rosinski in the booth for the Sunday doubleheader coverage the network carries. He also served as a substitute for Dave Sims on Sunday nights when his other broadcasting endeavors left him unavailable. David was joined in the booth by Tony Boselli until 2012. Tom McCarthy replaced David in the booth. As of 2012, Dial Global's other NFL play-by-play announcers include Kevin Kugler, Kevin Harlan, Dave Sims and Ian Eagle.

In 2006, David provided hand-by-hand coverage for many events at the World Series of Poker for Sirius Satellite Radio.

In 2012, David became the play-by-play voice for the United Football League broadcasts on the CBS Sports Network. In 2013, he served as a fill-in play-by-play commentator for Major League Baseball on Fox.

Preceded by Jack Buck	Monday Night Football national radio play-by-play announcer 1996-2001	Succeeded by Marv Albert
