= WQSH (FM) =

Alternative rock radio station in Cobleskill–Albany, New York

Simulcasting WQBK-FM, Malta
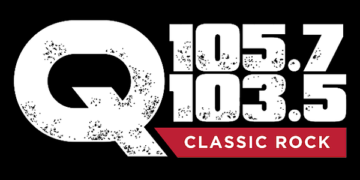
- Cobleskill, New York; United States
- Broadcast area: Capital District; Mohawk Valley; Utica, New York
- Frequency: 103.5 MHz
- Branding: Q105.7/103.5

Programming
- Format: Classic rock
- Affiliations: Compass Media Networks; New York Jets Radio Network

Ownership
- Owner: Townsquare Media; (Townsquare Media of Albany, Inc.)
- Sister stations: WGNA-FM; WPBZ-FM; WQBK-FM; WTMM-FM

History
- First air date: 1986 (as WITU)
- Former call signs: WITU (1986–1988); WACS-FM (1988–1989); WSHQ (1989–1994); WQBJ (1994–2019)

Technical information
- Licensing authority: FCC
- Facility ID: 40769
- Class: B
- ERP: 50,000 watts
- HAAT: 150 meters (490 ft)
- Transmitter coordinates: 42°58′21.3″N 74°29′28.5″W

Links
- Public license information: Public file; LMS
- Webcast: Listen live
- Website: q1057.com

WQSH (103.5 MHz) is a commercial FM radio station licensed to Cobleskill, New York, and serving the Mohawk Valley and the western Capital District of New York. The station is owned by Townsquare Media and broadcasts a classic rock radio format, simulcasting WQBK-FM 105.7. The radio studios and offices are on Kings Road in Schenectady.

WQSH has an effective radiated power (ERP) of 50,000 watts, the maximum for this section of the Northeastern United States. It transmits from a tower on Indian Road in Palatine, New York.

== History ==
WQSH signed on in 1986 as WITU with an adult contemporary format. The call sign was changed to WACS-FM in 1988. The next year, WACS-FM was sold to the owners of WSHZ (98.3 FM) and began simulcasting that station's adult contemporary format, and later its oldies music, using the call letters WSHQ.

The sale of WSHZ to the owners of WTRY (980 AM) in 1992 led to a return to adult contemporary music (albeit satellite fed) on 103.5 as a stop gap for the station before it was sold to then-WQBK-FM 103.9 owner Maximum Media in 1994. Maximum Media changed the call sign to WQBJ and used it to simulcast WQBK-FM's then-mainstream rock format (first Q-104, then The Edge and finally Q103), which would flip the next year to modern rock. Maximum Media was purchased by Radio Enterprises in 1996.

Radio Enterprises was bought out by Clear Channel Communications, which had owned a minority share of the company, in 1997. Then, in 1999, the Edge stations changed their formats to active rock, a format that remained through Clear Channel divesting the stations to Regent Communications (now Townsquare Media) in 2000.

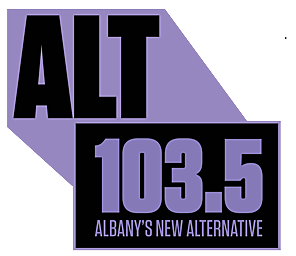
Logo as "Alt 103.5", used from 2019 to 2021

On July 1, 2019, WQBJ and WQBK-FM began directing listeners to WQSH (105.7 FM) as their longtime rock radio format moved to the 105.7 FM frequency. On August 1, 2019, WQBJ ended stunting and adopted WQSH's former alternative rock format as "Alt 103.5", putting the station in competition with Pamal Broadcasting's WINU, and independently owned WEQX. WQBK-FM, its former simulcast partner, concurrently launched a soft adult contemporary format as "103.9 The Breeze". The WQSH call letters were moved to 103.5 on September 18, 2019.

On September 3, 2021, the "Q" branding and classic rock format returned to 103.5 for the first time in over two years, this time branded as "Q105.7/103.5". This move reversed half of Townsquare Media's decision to switch formats and frequencies in 2019. This move also left the Capital District with two (at the time) alternative rock stations, WINU and WEQX. WINU has since flipped to a country format, leaving WEQX as the lone alternative station in the Capital District.
