= Mike Hart (outfielder, born 1958) =

American baseball player (born 1958)

- Outfielder
- Born: February 17, 1958 (age 68); Milwaukee, Wisconsin, U.S.
- Batted: Left Threw: Left

MLB debut
- May 8, 1984, for the Minnesota Twins

Last MLB appearance
- October 4, 1987, for the Baltimore Orioles

MLB statistics
- Batting average: .162
- Home runs: 4
- Runs batted in: 17
- Stats at Baseball Reference

Teams
- Minnesota Twins (1984); Baltimore Orioles (1987)

Michael Lawrence Hart (born February 17, 1958) is an American former Major League Baseball outfielder. He played parts of two seasons in the major leagues, for the Minnesota Twins in 1984 and for the Baltimore Orioles in 1987.

Hart went to high school in New Berlin, Wisconsin at New Berlin Eisenhower Middle/High School. Hart also went to college at the University of Wisconsin-Madison

Hart was drafted by the Seattle Mariners in 1979. After three-plus seasons in their organization, he was released, and signed by the Twins, with whom he made his major league debut on May 8, 1984. He played in 13 games for the Twins, batting .172.

Hart spent 1985 with the Twins' top farm team, the Toledo Mud Hens. The following spring, he was traded to the Orioles, and spent all of 1986 in the minors as well, with the Rochester Red Wings. In 1987, he got a second shot at the majors with Baltimore, spending the last month and a half of the season as the Orioles' starting center fielder. He fared a little better: although he hit his first four major league home runs, his batting average was just .158. Hart was released by the Orioles at the end of the season, ending his professional career.
