= Meghan Coffey =

- Born: Meghan Coffey; New Berlin, Wisconsin, U.S.
- Education: Marquette University
- Beauty pageant titleholder
- Title: Miss New Berlin 2006; Miss Wisconsin 2006
- Hair color: Brown
- Eye color: Brown
- Major competition: Miss America 2007

Meghan Coffey is a beauty queen from New Berlin, Wisconsin who competed in the Miss America pageant in 2007.

Coffey was raised in New Berlin, Wisconsin and upon graduation from high school, she attended Marquette University, where she received her Bachelor of Science degree in Biomedical Engineering in May 2006. Coffey received her Juris Doctor degree from Marquette in May 2012 and is now a registered patent attorney.

== Pageant History ==
Coffey is an accomplished twirler who was the national talent winner in the 2003 Miss National Teenager pageant held in Nashville, Tennessee. She first competed in the Miss Wisconsin pageant in June 2005 after winning the Miss Milwaukee title earlier that year. In the state pageant she won a preliminary swimsuit award and placed fourth runner-up.

The following year Coffey won the Miss New Berlin local title and competed in the Miss Wisconsin pageant for the second time. She again won a preliminary swimsuit award, and was chosen as the state titleholder for 2006. She is the second consecutive Miss New Berlin to win the Miss Wisconsin pageant. Her first runner-up, Caitlin Morrall, later competed and won the Miss Wisconsin USA pageant in September 2006 and competed at Miss USA.

Coffey represented Wisconsin in the Miss America 2007 pageant held in Las Vegas, Nevada in January 2007.

== Charity work ==
Coffey has been active in a number of charity activities such as volunteering and working for Children's Hospital of Wisconsin on "Project A.D.A.M." (Automatic Defibrillators in Adam's Memory), an initiative begun after 4 young athletes died from sudden cardiac arrest during sporting activities.

Coffey is the founder of "Start a Heart" an organization founded in 2004 to talk to schools, teachers, parents and coaches about the need for Automatic External Defibrillators (AEDs) to be placed in school buildings and gymnasiums and to train students and staff on how to use them. She became involved in these causes after a younger cousin had been hit in the chest with a baseball, and immediate action saved the cousin's life. The Start a Heart organization has supported the New Berlin Fire Department in their 2006 drive to have AEDs installed in all of the city ambulances, and fund raising efforts have been made through various events such as lectures, demonstrations and fundraising dance clinics.

== Dance ==
Coffey has been active in both dance and baton-twirling. After winning several state championships, she was placed as one of the top six baton-twirlers in the US.
