= List of Monday Night Football commentators =

The following is a list of sportscasters who have served as commentators for Monday Night Football broadcasts on various networks, along with each commentator's period of tenure on the show (beginning years of each season shown, as the NFL season ends in the calendar year after it begins). Game announcers used in #2 games usually come from ESPN and are included for both wild card playoff games (1995–2005 except 2002–2003 season) and secondary regular season games (1987, 1997, 2005–present).

== Television ==
=== ABC ===
==== Play-by-play announcers ====
- Keith Jackson (1970)
- Frank Gifford (1971–1985; also when Al Michaels was working postseason baseball 1986–1989)
- Al Michaels (1986–2005)
- Gary Bender (#2, 1987)
- Mike Patrick (#2, 1997 and 2005)

==== Color commentators ====
- Howard Cosell (1970–1983)
- Don Meredith (1970–1973, 1977–1984)
- Fred Williamson (1974 preseason only)
- Alex Karras (1974–1976)
- Fran Tarkenton (1979–1982)
- O. J. Simpson (1983–1985)
- Joe Namath (1985)
- Frank Gifford (1986–1997)
- Lynn Swann (#2, 1986–1987)
- Dan Dierdorf (1987–1998)
- Joe Theismann (#2, 1997 and 2005)
- Boomer Esiason (1998–1999)
- Dan Fouts (2000–2001)
- Dennis Miller (2000–2001)
- John Madden (2002–2005)
- Paul Maguire (#2, 2005)

==== Sideline reporters ====
- Lynn Swann (1994–1997, Super Bowls)
- Ron Jaworski (#2, 1997)
- Lesley Visser (1998–1999 and during Wild Card playoffs and Super Bowl XXXIV)
- Eric Dickerson (2000–2001)
- Melissa Stark (2000–2002; Super Bowl XXXVII)
- Lisa Guerrero (2003)
- Michele Tafoya (2004–2005)
- Sam Ryan (2005)
- Suzy Kolber (2005; Super Bowl XL)

==== Studio hosts ====
- Jim Lampley (halftime and Super Bowl XIX co-host)
- Al Michaels (Super Bowl XIX co-host)
- Keith Jackson (Super Bowl XXII host)
- Chris Berman (halftime host, 1996–1999 and during Wild Card playoffs and Super Bowls)
- Mike Tirico (Super Bowl)
- Brent Musburger (studio host, 1990–1995)
- Robin Roberts (Hurricane Katrina telethon co-host, 2005)

==== Studio analysts ====
- Dick Vermeil (playoffs and Super Bowl, 1990–1995)
- Boomer Esiason (playoffs and Super Bowl XXIX)
- Joe Theismann (Super Bowl XIX)
- Peter King (1995)
- Frank Gifford (1998)
- Steve Young (playoffs and Super Bowl)
- Brian Billick (Super Bowl XXXVII)
- Michael Strahan (Super Bowl XXXVII)
- Tom Jackson (playoffs and Super Bowl XL)
- Michael Irvin (playoffs and Super Bowl XL)
- Chris Mortensen (playoffs and Super Bowl XL)
- Bill Belichick (Super Bowl XL)

==== Wild Card Playoffs (No. 2 game) ====
===== Play-by-play announcers =====
- Brent Musburger (1990–1995, 2002)
- Mike Patrick (1996–2001, 2003–2005)

===== Color commentators =====
- Dick Vermeil (1990–1995)
- Joe Theismann (1996–2001, 2003–2005)
- Paul Maguire (1998–2001, 2003–2005)
- Gary Danielson (2002)

===== Sideline reporters =====
- Lesley Visser (1990–1997)
- Solomon Wilcots (1998–2000)
- Suzy Kolber (2001, 2003–2005)
- Jack Arute (2002)

=== ESPN ===
==== Play-by-play announcers ====
- Mike Tirico (2006–2015)
- Sean McDonough (2016–2017)
- Joe Tessitore (2018–2019)
- Steve Levy (2020–2021)
- Joe Buck (2022–present)

==== Color commentators ====
- Tony Kornheiser (2006–2008)
- Joe Theismann (2006)
- Ron Jaworski (2007–2011)
- Jon Gruden (2009–2017)
- Matt Hasselbeck (2018 Pro Bowl)
- Booger McFarland (2018–2019)
- Jason Witten (2018)
- Brian Griese (2020–2021)
- Louis Riddick (2020–2021)
- Troy Aikman (2022–present)

==== Sideline reporters ====
- Michele Tafoya (2006–2010)
- Suzy Kolber (2006–2010, 2011 Week 2, 5, 6, 11, 16)
- Wendi Nix (fill-in, 2011 Week 1, 4, 12)
- Rachel Nichols (fill-in, 2011 Week 5, 8–10, 14)
- Sal Paolantonio (fill-in, 2011 Week 7, 13)
- John Sutcliffe (fill-in, 2011 Week 15)
- Ed Werder (fill-in, 2011 Week 3)
- Laura Rutledge (2025–present, fill-in, 2020 Week 16, 2023 Week 11, 2024 Week 1, 6, 9, 11, 12)
- Lisa Salters (2012–present)

==== Rules analysts ====
- Gerald Austin (2012–2017)
- Jeff Triplette (2018)
- John Parry (2019–2023)
- Russell Yurk (2024–present)

==== Studio hosts ====
- Chris Berman (2006–2016)
- Stuart Scott (2007–2014)
- Suzy Kolber (2014–2022)
- Scott Van Pelt (2023–present)

==== Studio analysts ====
- Michael Irvin (2006)
- Tom Jackson (2006–2015)
- Steve Young (2006–2022)
- Keyshawn Johnson (2007–2015)
- Bill Parcells (2007)
- Emmitt Smith (2007–2008)
- Cris Carter (2008–2015)
- Mike Ditka (2008–2015)
- Matt Millen (2009–2010)
- Trent Dilfer (2011–2016)
- Ray Lewis (2013–2015)
- Matt Hasselbeck (2016–2018)
- Charles Woodson (2016–2018)
- Randy Moss (2017–2021)
- Louis Riddick (2019)
- Adam Schefter (2019–present)
- Booger McFarland (2020–2022)
- Alex Smith (2021–2023)
- Robert Griffin III (2022–2023)
- Larry Fitzgerald (2022–2023)
- Ryan Clark (2023–2025)
- Marcus Spears (2023–present)
- Jason Kelce (2024–present)
- Jason McCourty (2026–present)
- Pat McAfee (2026–present)
- Seth Rollins (2026-present)

==== No. 2 teams ====
===== Play-by-play announcers =====
- Brad Nessler (2006, 2010–2011)
- Mike Greenberg (2007–2009)
- Chris Berman (2012–2016)
- Beth Mowins (2017–2018)
- Steve Levy (2019, 2022)
- Chris Fowler (2020–2021, 2023–2025)
- Dave Pasch (2026–present)

===== Color commentators =====
- Ron Jaworski (2006)
- Dick Vermeil (2006)
- Mike Ditka (2007–2008)
- Mike Golic (2007–2009)
- Steve Young (2009, 2016)
- Trent Dilfer (2010–2015)
- Rex Ryan (2017)
- Brian Griese (2018–2019)
- Louis Riddick (2019, 2022–2025)
- Kirk Herbstreit (2020–2021)
- Dan Orlovsky (2022–2025)
- Kurt Warner (2026–present)
- Jason Kelce (2026–present)

===== Sideline reporters =====
- Bonnie Bernstein (2006–2007)
- Suzy Kolber (2008–2010)
- Rachel Nichols (2011–2012)
- Sal Paolantonio (2013)
- Lindsay Czarniak (2014–2016)
- Sergio Dipp (2017)
- Laura Rutledge (2018, 2021–2024)
- Dianna Russini (2019)
- Maria Taylor (2020)
- Molly McGrath (2026-present; fill-in, 2024 week 7)
- Katie George (2025)
- Peter Schrager (2025)

===== Rules analysts =====
- Jerry Bergman (2024)
- Mike Chase (2025–present)

=== ESPN Deportes/ESPN Latin America ===
- Rebeca Landa (play-by-play, 2023–present)
- Sergio Dipp (color commentator, 2023–present)
- MJ Acosta-Ruiz (sideline reporter, 2024–present)
- John Sutcliffe (contributor, 2006–present)

=== Tencent Sports (mainland China) ===
- Payton Fu 傅皓南 (play-by-play, 2020–present)

== Radio ==
=== CBS Radio/Westwood One ===
- Marv Albert (play-by-play, 2002–2009)
- Bonnie Bernstein (sideline reporter, 2001–2005)
- Jack Buck (play-by-play, 1978–1984, 1987–1995)
- Randy Cross (backup color commentator, 2010)
- Howard David (play-by-play, 1996–2001)
- John Dockery (sideline reporter, 1999–2007)
- Rich Eisen (studio host, 2021–2024)
- Jamie Erdahl (studio host, 2026–present)
- Boomer Esiason (color commentator, 2000–2017)
- Dan Fouts (backup color commentator, 2011–2013)
- Mike Golic (studio host, 2025)
- Mike Golic Jr. (studio analyst, 2025)
- Jim Gray (studio host, 2001–2020)
- Kevin Harlan (backup play-by-play, 2009; play-by-play, 2010–present)
- Matt Millen (color commentator, 1996–2000)
- Warren Moon (backup color commentator, 2009)
- Doug Pederson (studio analyst, 2026–present)
- Hank Stram (color commentator, 1978–1984, 1987–1995)
- Lesley Visser (color commentator, 2001)
- Kurt Warner (backup color commentator, 2014–2017, color commentator 2018–present)

=== Mutual Radio ===
- Lindsey Nelson (play-by-play, 1974–1977)
- Van Patrick (play-by-play, 1972–1973)

=== NBC Radio ===
- Don Criqui (play-by-play, 1985–1986)
- Bob Trumpy (color commentator, 1985–1986)
