= Merle Harmon =

American sportscaster (1926–2009)

Merle Harmon, circa 1980.

Merle Reid Harmon (June 21, 1926 – April 15, 2009) was an American sportscaster who was the play-by-play voice for five Major League Baseball teams, two teams in the American Football League and the World Football League's nationally syndicated telecaster. Harmon also owned a chain of sporting good clothing stores. On July 1, 1987, at 3:00pm EDT. Merle Harmon was the first voice heard on WFAN Sports Radio 1050 in New York. His recorded call of the New York Jets winning Super Bowl III was played prior to Suzyn Waldman's first live update.

== Early life and career ==
Born and raised in Salem, Illinois, Harmon served with the United States Navy in the Pacific during World War II. After the conflict ended, he attended Graceland College on the G.I. Bill, earning an Associate of Arts degree in 1947. He graduated from the University of Denver with a Bachelor of Arts degree in radio & television broadcasting and marketing in 1949. He began his broadcasting career later that same year with the Topeka Owls, a minor league baseball team in the Kansas–Oklahoma–Missouri League.

== Broadcasting career ==
=== 1950s ===
For two years beginning in 1953, Harmon broadcast University of Kansas football and basketball games as the first-ever voice of the KU Radio Network. In 1954, he called baseball for the Kansas City Blues of the American Association, moving to the major league Kansas City Athletics the following year after that franchise's relocation from Philadelphia. He replaced By Saam, who returned to being the Phillies' main voice. Harmon first did Athletics play-by-play on KMBC-AM with Larry Ray (1955–56) and Ed Edwards (1957–58), then later on WDAF radio and television with Bill Grigsby (1959–61).

He was fired after the 1961 season by Charlie Finley, who had purchased the ballclub the previous year, for refusing to participate in a campaign intended to spite the sports editor of the Kansas City Star.

=== 1960s ===
Harmon's first experience on national television came in 1961 when he was hired by ABC Sports to anchor various studio shows and call college football games. He, along with Chris Schenkel and Keith Jackson, were the play-by-play announcers for the network's baseball Game of the Week in 1965. His broadcast partner was Jackie Robinson.

He became the primary broadcaster for the Milwaukee Braves in 1964, succeeding Earl Gillespie who resigned to become the sports director at WITI-TV. After two years working alongside Tom Collins (1964) and Blaine Walsh (1964–65) on WEMP-AM, Harmon was not retained by the Braves, which moved to Atlanta and selected Milo Hamilton, a voice more recognized in the new market, instead.

Harmon joined Herb Carneal and Halsey Hall for Minnesota Twins broadcasts on WCCO-AM and WTCN-TV from 1967 to 1969. He had replaced Ray Scott, who was designated the lead National Football League announcer on CBS.

Harmon also lent his talents to professional football, reteaming with Grigsby to call Kansas City Chiefs games in 1963, its first season after moving from Dallas. He became the voice of the New York Jets for the next nine years, first on WABC-AM (1964–70), then on WOR-AM (1971–72). His broadcast partners were Otto Graham (1964–65), Dick Young (1966–67) and Sam DeLuca (1968–1972). The highlight of Harmon's time with the Jets was the team's run to the Super Bowl Championship in 1968, which included the Heidi Game and victories over the Oakland Raiders and Baltimore Colts in the American Football League Championship Game and Super Bowl III respectively.

=== 1970s ===
In 1970, Harmon became lead announcer for the Milwaukee Brewers and continued in that role through the remainder of the decade, teaming with Tom Collins and later Bob Uecker. He also went into business during this period with Merle Harmon's Fan Fair, a chain of retail stores devoted to licensed sports merchandise. It grew to 140 stores nationwide before he sold the business in 1996.

Also, Harmon was the play-by-play voice for the World Football League's Thursday night Game of the Week telecasts on TVS in 1974, the circuit's only complete season. He was joined in the broadcast booth by regular game analyst Alex Hawkins and various guest commentators, who included George Plimpton, Burt Reynolds and McLean Stevenson.

=== 1980s and beyond ===
From 1980 to 1982, Harmon worked for NBC Sports, calling regional NFL, MLB, and college basketball action and contributing to the weekly Sportsworld anthology series. He was also slated to work on the network's coverage of the 1980 Summer Olympics in Moscow, before the U.S. boycott of those Games. In 1988, Harmon returned to call several September NFL telecasts for NBC while the network's regular announcers were working that year's Summer Olympics in Seoul.

Prior to his retirement from broadcasting, Harmon worked on Texas Rangers telecasts, first on KXAS-TV (1982–1984), then on Home Sports Entertainment (HSE) (1984–1989). During his eight seasons with the Rangers, he worked alongside Steve Busby (1982–85), Mark Holtz (1984), Norm Hitzges (1986–89), Bob Carpenter (1986–88) and Greg Lucas (1989).

Harmon called Southwest Conference college-football telecasts for the regional broadcaster Raycom Sports in the early 1980s, frequently paired with former Oklahoma head football coach Bud Wilkinson. He called the 1985 and 1986 Liberty Bowl broadcasts for Raycom as well and the 1981 Hall of Fame Bowl between Kansas and Mississippi State for Mizlou Sports in Birmingham, Ala.

Harmon made a cinematic appearance, playing one of the two NCAA Finals announcers in the 2006 feature film Glory Road.

Prior to his death, he was an active member of the National Speakers Association, and self-published his book, Stories, a collection of humorous adventures from his broadcasting career. He was a successful keynote speaker at numerous conferences and association meetings.

Harmon died of pneumonia at a hospital in Arlington, Texas on April 15, 2009.
