= Subcontinental divide =

The Subcontinental Divide is a drainage divide in southeastern Wisconsin running north to south along the Waukesha County/Milwaukee County border (mirroring Sunnyslope Rd. in New Berlin, WI). It is a watershed between two drainage basins. Water falling to the east of the divide flows to the east towards Lake Michigan and water falling to the west of the divide flows west towards the Mississippi River, eventually flowing into the Gulf of Mexico. Although 62 percent of the area's population lives on the eastern side of the divide, due to the projected growth west of the divide, water shortages west of the divide have become a growing concern due to radium contamination in the area's aquifers. To overcome the water shortage problems posed by the subcontinental divide, New Berlin has reached an agreement with the City of Milwaukee to expand their water purchases and receive safe drinking water from Lake Michigan, on the provision as agreed upon by the Great Lakes Compact, that the treated water be returned to the Great Lakes Basin.
