= School District of New Berlin =

School district in Wisconsin, United States

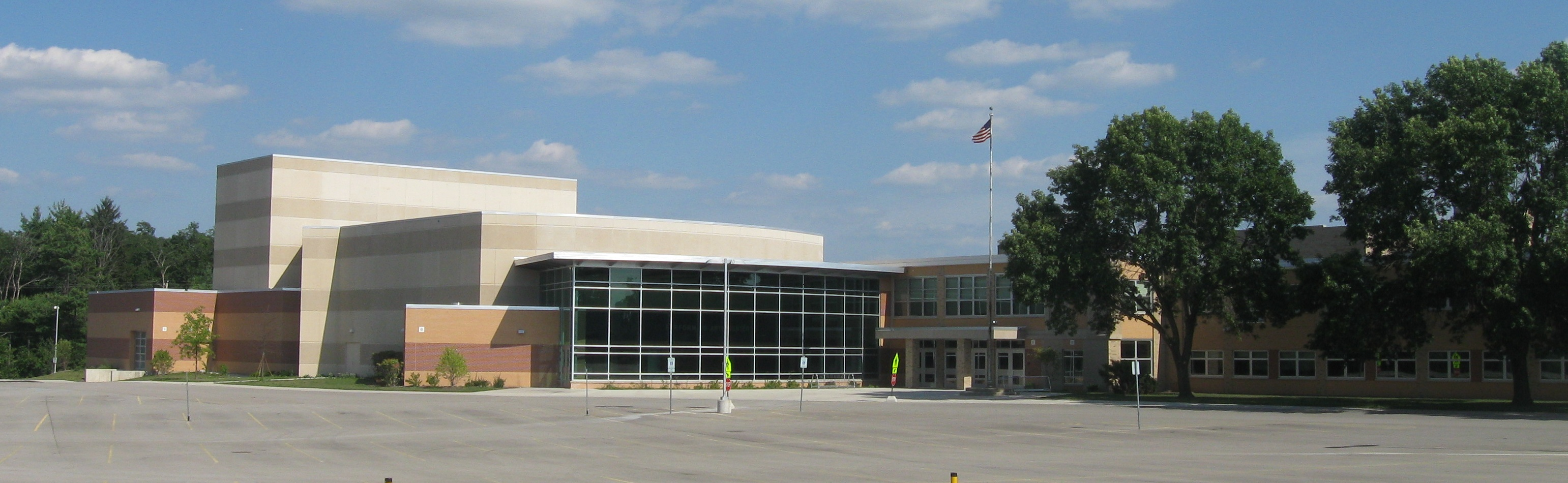
- New Berlin West High School

Address
- 4333 S Sunnyslope Rd New Berlin, Wisconsin, 53151; United States

District information
- Type: Suburban, Large
- Grades: PK–12
- Schools: 6
- NCES District ID: 5510470

Students and staff
- Students: 4,334 (2024–25)
- Teachers: 280.22 (on an FTE basis)
- Student–teacher ratio: 15.47

Other information
- Website: www.nbexcellence.org

The School District of New Berlin is a school district in New Berlin, Wisconsin, United States.

== Schools ==
- Elmwood Elementary
- Orchard Lane Elementary
- Poplar Creek Elementary
- Ronald Reagan Elementary
- New Berlin Eisenhower Middle/High School
- New Berlin West High School
