= Wavelet transform modulus maxima method =

Method for detecting a signal's fractal dimension

The wavelet transform modulus maxima (WTMM) is a method for detecting the fractal dimension of a signal.

More than this, the WTMM is capable of partitioning the time and scale domain of a signal into fractal dimension regions, and the method is sometimes referred to as a "mathematical microscope" due to its ability to inspect the multi-scale dimensional characteristics of a signal and possibly inform about the sources of these characteristics.

The WTMM method uses continuous wavelet transform rather than Fourier transforms to detect singularities – that is discontinuities, areas in the signal that are not continuous at a particular derivative.

In particular, this method is useful when analyzing multifractal signals, that is, signals having multiple fractal dimensions.

== Description ==
Consider a signal that can be represented by the following equation:

$$f(t) = a_0 + a_1 (t - t_i) + a_2(t - t_i)^2 + \cdots + a_h(t - t_i)^{h_i} \,$$

where $t$ is close to $t_i$ and $h_i$ is a non-integer quantifying the local singularity. (Compare this to a Taylor series, where in practice only a limited number of low-order terms are used to approximate a continuous function.)

Generally, a continuous wavelet transform decomposes a signal as a function of time, rather than assuming the signal is stationary (For example, the Fourier transform). Any continuous wavelet can be used, though the first derivative of the Gaussian distribution and the Mexican hat wavelet (2nd derivative of Gaussian) are common. Choice of wavelet may depend on characteristics of the signal being investigated.

Below we see one possible wavelet basis given by the first derivative of the Gaussian:

$$G' (t,a,b) = \frac{a}{(2\pi)^{-1/2}}(t - b) e^{\left(\frac{-(t-b)^2}{2a^2}\right)} \,$$

Once a "mother wavelet" is chosen, the continuous wavelet transform is carried out as a continuous, square-integrable function that can be scaled and translated. Let $a > 0$ be the scaling constant and $b\in\mathbb{R}$ be the translation of the wavelet along the signal:

$$X_w(a,b)=\frac{1}{\sqrt{a}} \int_{-\infty}^\infty x(t)\psi^\ast \left(\frac{t-b}{a}\right)\, dt$$

where $\psi(t)$ is a continuous function in both the time domain and the frequency domain called the mother wavelet and $^{\ast}$ represents the operation of complex conjugate.

By calculating $X_w(a,b)$ for subsequent wavelets that are derivatives of the mother wavelet, singularities can be identified. Successive derivative wavelets remove the contribution of lower order terms in the signal, allowing the maximum $h_i$ to be detected. (Recall that when taking derivatives, lower order terms become 0.) This is the "modulus maxima".

Thus, this method identifies the singularity spectrum by convolving the signal with a wavelet at different scales and time offsets.

The WTMM is then capable of producing a "skeleton" that partitions the scale and time space by fractal dimension.

== History ==
The WTMM was developed out of the larger field of continuous wavelet transforms, which arose in the 1980s, and its contemporary fractal dimension methods.

At its essence, it is a combination of fractal dimension box counting methods and continuous wavelet transforms, where wavelets at various scales are used instead of boxes.

WTMM was originally developed by Mallat and Hwang in 1992 and used for image processing .

Bacry, Muzy, and Arneodo were early users of this methodology. It has subsequently been used in fields related to signal processing.
