= WTMM-FM =

Coordinates: 42.879°N 73.863°W

- Mechanicville, New York; United States
- Broadcast area: Capital District; Saratoga Springs
- Frequency: 104.5 MHz
- Branding: ESPN Radio 104.5 The Team

Programming
- Format: Sports
- Affiliations: ESPN Radio; New York Yankees Radio Network

Ownership
- Owner: Townsquare Media; (Townsquare Media of Albany, Inc.)
- Sister stations: WGNA-FM; WQBK-FM; WQSH; WPBZ-FM

History
- First air date: 1993 (as WXLE)
- Former call signs: WVYD (1991–1992, CP); WXLE (1992–1999); WABT (1999–2006)
- Call sign meaning: "Team"

Technical information
- Facility ID: 22004
- Class: A
- ERP: 5,000 watts
- HAAT: 107 meters (351 ft)

Links
- Webcast: Listen live
- Website: www.1045theteam.com

WTMM-FM (104.5 FM, "ESPN Radio 104.5 The Team") is a sports radio station licensed to Mechanicville, New York, and serving New York's Capital Region and Saratoga County. The station is owned by Townsquare Media, and broadcasts at 6 kilowatts ERP from a tower in Clifton Park, New York, which is shared with WKKF and WMHH. The station airs play-by-play from the New York Yankees as well as all of ESPN Radio's programming.

WTMM-FM assumed the Team format from its former home on 1300 kHz (now WGDJ under new ownership) on December 18, 2006, with the two stations simulcasting until January 2, 2007.

== History ==
The station signed on the air as WXLE in January 1993. It initially aired a rock/AC format, known as "Rock without the Racket" but evolved to an adult album alternative format by late 1993, with live DJs. The station was known as XL-104.5 in those days, and eventually as 104.5 The Zone. As a "Triple A" station, XL-104.5 was the first station helmed by noted Triple A programmer Zeb Norris. Some other notable air personalities that were on WXLE during this period included original program director Bob Welch and market veteran John Clark. In mid-1996 much of its programming became satellite-fed.

In 1998, WXLE, was sold to AMFM Inc. and with it came two format changes, first to adult contemporary as Magic 104.5 in October as a smokescreen, then on December 26, to the then-popular "Jammin' Oldies" format (which AMFM owned the rights to). With the latter switch came the branding of 104.5 The Beat and the calls of WABT.

Like other "Jammin' Oldies" stations, WABT had a short-term uptick in ratings; however, the format did not mesh well with the Albany market and ratings fell to levels of that of the prior formats. When AMFM merged with Clear Channel Communications in 2000, WABT was one of several stations which was divested due to market concentration concerns. After being sold to Regent Communications (now Townsquare Media), WABT's format changed to 1980s hits as "The Buzz" on December 8, 2000. The "Buzz" format was later expanded to include music from the 1990s in September 2002, and evolved to adult top 40 in July 2003.

In mid-2006, reports began circulating that the Buzz format could move to the relocated 105.7 MHz frequency that previously had been licensed to Queensbury. In the wake of landing the Chuck & Kelly morning show from WYJB in September 2006, these rumors would soon become true. The Buzz format officially moved to 105.7 MHz on December 4, 2006, after spending much of the previous week test simulcasting.

On December 18, 2006, WABT flipped to a simulcast of ESPN Radio station WTMM as WTMM-FM; 104.5 would become the sole home of the sports format on January 3, 2007, when WTMM (AM) became female-oriented talk WEEV. The simulcast would partially resume on August 17, 2007, when WEEV returned to the WTMM format and calls, though due to rights issues, it did not clear any of WTMM-FM's play by play; this arrangement ended on November 26, 2007, when the 1300 frequency became home to WGDJ under new ownership.

As of 2024, WTMM broadcasts most of the ESPN Radio weekday schedule, while running the network fulltime at the weekend, outside of Yankee games and an hour on Sunday morning presented by Vinny Fredericks. The weekday morning slot was a simulcast of WHSQ in New York City's DiPietro and Rothenberg, however they were removed at the start of 2026 and have been replaced by ESPN Radio's Unsportsmanlike. The midday slot is hosted by longtime WNYT sports director Rodger Wyland as "Big Board Sports with Rodger Wyland", and the 3-4pm hour is "Open Mike" with MJ Johnson. The former afternoon drive show, "The Drive with Dan Bahl", has been discontinued due to Dan Bahl leaving Townsquare Media.

=== Specialty programming ===
WTMM also broadcasts New York Yankees baseball. They also broadcast ESPN Radio's national MLB, NFL, and NBA packages. In addition, WTMM was the flagship home to Albany Devils hockey, until they relocated in 2017, airing most games when not conflicting with other sport broadcasts. WTMM-FM formerly aired the New York Jets football games until 2019, when they moved to WQBK-FM.

In 2023, WTMM added Buffalo Bills games.
