= WPBZ-FM =

US radio station in Rensselaer, New York

- Rensselaer, New York; United States
- Broadcast area: Capital District
- Frequency: 103.9 MHz
- Branding: Zoey 103.9

Programming
- Format: Hot adult contemporary

Ownership
- Owner: Townsquare Media; (Townsquare Media of Albany, Inc.)
- Sister stations: WGNA-FM; WQBK-FM; WQSH; WTMM-FM

History
- First air date: December 1, 1972
- Former call signs: WQBK-FM (1972–2019)
- Call sign meaning: "Breeze" (previous format)

Technical information
- Licensing authority: FCC
- Facility ID: 40767
- Class: A
- ERP: 6,000 watts
- HAAT: 92 meters (302 ft)
- Transmitter coordinates: 42°35′06″N 73°46′27″W

Links
- Public license information: Public file; LMS
- Webcast: Listen live
- Website: zoey1039.com

WPBZ-FM (103.9 MHz, "Zoey 103.9") is a commercial FM radio station licensed to Rensselaer, New York, and serving the Capital District, including the Albany–Schenectady–Troy radio market. The station is owned by Townsquare Media and airs a hot adult contemporary radio format. The studios and offices are on Kings Road in Schenectady.

WPBZ-FM has an effective radiated power (ERP) of 6,000 watts, with its transmitter off Smultz Road in Glenmont, New York.

== History ==
=== Early years ===
On December 1, 1972, the station signed on as WQBK-FM. It was owned by the People Communications Corporation and was the FM simulcast of WQBK 1300 AM (now WGDJ).

WQBK was a daytimer, required to go off the air at night. WQBK-FM was able to continue the AM station's middle of the road programming after dark for listeners with FM radios.

=== Progressive rock ===
In the early 1970s, some FM stations around the country were experimenting with Free Form music hosted by youthful disc jockeys. By early 1975, WQBK-FM began to air progressive rock, starting each afternoon at 4 p.m., with the earlier hours of the day still being a simulcast of WQBK. The rock music proved popular and WQBK-FM flipped to a full-time progressive rock format in August 1975. The original broadcast day was 7 a.m.-1 a.m., with WQBK-FM signing off overnight. The station began promoting itself as WQBK-FM... The Progressive 104. Two years later, WQBK-FM debuted the simpler Q104 branding for the station.

In 1980, former beautiful music station WHSH switched to a new format as WPYX, a more mainstream album rock format that only played the biggest selling albums. WPYX also had a full power signal while WQBK-FM was a Class A station, limited to only 3,000 watts. As a result, WQBK-FM saw its ratings slip. In 1984, the original owners sold the station, along with co-owned WQBK AM 1300, to Dick Berkson. Berkson tweaked WQBK-FM's format with its wide-ranging playlist to a more mainstream format with elements of the Big Chill rock (which had a heavy lean on 1960s hits). WQBK-FM was rebranded as The New QBK FM 104 with the slogan "The Rock That Matters".

=== Classic rock ===
The Big Chill format did not catch on. In 1987, the station relaunched as a more mainstream classic rock outlet, returning to the Q104 branding. During this period, the programming was harder-edged classic rock with a limited number of current songs, mainly new material from core artists of the time.

In 1988, WQBK and WQBK-FM were sold to Albany Broadcasting. In 1992, WQBK-FM began carrying the syndicated Howard Stern Show from New York City. Stern's show proved to be very popular in the Capital District, unseating the previous top morning show, WGY's Don Weeks, for the next thirteen years.

WQBK-FM was limited by its Class A signal that was hard to hear outside Albany, Schenectady, Troy and their close-in suburbs. In 1994, Albany Broadcasting acquired WSHQ, an FM station at 103.5 MHz in Cobleskill, with a full Class B signal, running 50,000 watts, changing the call letters to WQBJ. WQSH could reach communities that were outside WQBK-FM's range, especially to the west of Albany.

=== Modern rock ===
One year later, the stations flipped to mainstream rock and rebranded as 103.5/103.9 The Edge, placed between classic rock WPYX and active rock WZRQ. However, the mainstream rock format only lasted a short time. After several months of faltering ratings, the stations flipped to modern rock, which made the stations a success in the Albany market within a year (scoring in the top 5 ratings and #1 18-34 spot), thanks to the combination of modern rock and Howard Stern.

In 1996, Radio Enterprises acquired Maximum Media (then-owners of WQBK-FM, WQBJ, and WQBK). Two years later, Clear Channel Communications purchased Radio Enterprises, and increased voice-tracking and automation at the station as well as leaning towards harder-edged songs.

=== Return to active rock ===
The stations returned officially to active rock on September 17, 1999. Two weeks later, former sister station WHRL flipped to modern rock to fill the void left by WQBK-FM and WQBJ's switch to a harder rock presentation.

When AMFM merged with Clear Channel in 2000, Clear Channel had to divest some of its properties because it was over its limit of stations in some media markets such as Albany. WQBK-FM/WQBJ and WTMM (the former WQBK) were then sold to Regent Communications (now Townsquare Media). Shortly after, Regent tweaked the format to a more mainstream active rock direction, and eventually included some alternative rock in the playlist. In December 2005, Howard Stern moved to Sirius Satellite Radio, causing a drop in the ratings for "The Edge".

On the morning of December 16, 2005, The Edge format was flipped to album-oriented rock, changing the station's moniker to Q103 and the slogan Where Rock Lives, also used on WNEW-FM in New York City. As a replacement for Howard Stern, The Free Beer and Hot Wings Show debuted as WQBK-FM/WQBJ's morning show (based at co-owned WGRD-FM in Grand Rapids, Michigan). (The Edge name was later revived on Pamal Broadcasting's active rock station WZMR.) During this time, WQBK-FM/WQBJ were positioned between WPYX and WZMR in terms of music playlist.

Two years later, the stations again returned to active rock, using slogans such as Relentless Rock and Go Rock Yourself to promote the new format. The stations began to climb back up the ratings. Like the former Edge, the stations had an alternative lean, although most modern rock songs played on the stations were found on both the modern and active rock charts. A year later, WHRL flipped to active rock.

By the end of 2010, WQBK-FM/WQBJ was the only active rock radio station remaining in the Albany market, as WZMR had changed to country music and WHRL began simulcasting talk radio WGY. Mediabase and Arbitron began listing WQBK-FM/WQBJ as active rock stations, while Nielsen BDS put WQBK-FM/WQBJ on the mainstream rock panel as of 2012. On September 2, 2011, WKLI-FM flipped from variety hits to active rock adding new competition in the Albany market. However, WQBK-FM/WQBJ still leaned more alternative than its competitor.

WKLI's rock format lasted only two years, as in October 2013, WKLI flipped from active rock to country music, leaving WQBK-FM/WQBJ as the only active rock radio station in the Albany area once again. By 2017, WQBK-FM/WQBJ had evolved back to a classic rock format so as to compete with WPYX, but with a more '80s and '90s based format. The stations used the slogan Classic Rock Redefined.

=== Soft AC ===
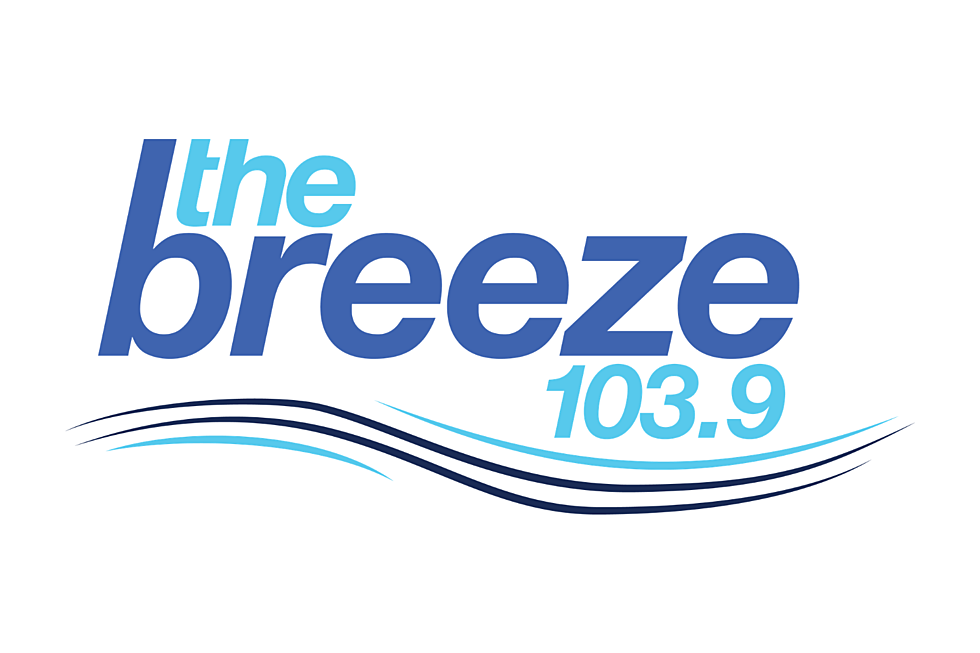
Logo as "103.9 The Breeze"

On July 1, 2019, WQBK-FM and WQBJ dropped the "Q103" rock format, which was moved to co-owned WQSH. WQBK-FM and WQBJ then began stunting, directing listeners to tune to WQSH, as WQBK-FM and WQBJ planned to take on new formats. Until July 2019, WQBK-FM had been longest-running commercial rock music station in the Albany radio market, predating WPYX by five years. At the time of the format's move to WQSH, WQBK-FM's DJ line-up included The Free Beer and Hot Wings Show, Candace, Tigman, Vinnie and Nights with Alice Cooper.

On August 1, 2019, WQBK-FM ended stunting and launched a soft adult contemporary format, branded as "103.9 The Breeze", putting the station in competition with Pamal Broadcasting's WROW and WYJB. WQBJ, in turn, ended its WQBK-FM simulcast after 26 years and took WQSH's former alternative rock format as "Alt 103.5". On August 9, 2019, WQBK-FM changed its call sign to WPBZ-FM to match the "Breeze" branding; the WQBK-FM call sign moved to 105.7, while its former WQSH call letters were moved to 103.5.

On November 1, 2019, WPBZ-FM flipped to Christmas music, beating out long-time Christmas music stations WYJB and WTRY-FM in the Albany-Schenectady-Troy market for the 2019 holiday season.

=== Hot AC ===
On March 28, 2024, WPBZ changed to a hot adult contemporary format, branded as "Zoey 103.9" and featuring a presentation akin to that of a variety hits station.

On October 31, 2026, WPBZ-FM made a first-time move to Christmas music under the hot AC format, retaining the "Zoey" branding. The station will return to its regular format on January 4, 2027.

== EdgeTV ==
For a brief period in 2000, WQBK-FM/WQBJ had an association with startup cable-only UPN network affiliate WEDG-TV. The cable TV channel used "EdgeTV" branding and a variant of the radio station's logo as its on-air logo. After WQBK-FM and WQBJ were taken over by Regent Communications, the cable TV station changed its name to "UPN 4". It ended in 2003 when UPN signed up a new over-the-air affiliate, WNYA.
