= WQBK-FM =

Radio station in Malta–Albany, New York

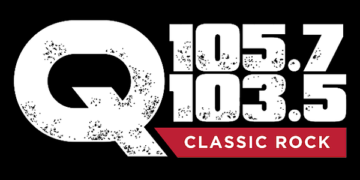
- Malta, New York; United States
- Broadcast area: Capital District, New York
- Frequency: 105.7 MHz (HD Radio)
- Branding: Q105.7/103.5

Programming
- Language: English
- Format: Classic rock
- Subchannels: HD2: "Hot 99.1" (Urban contemporary)
- Affiliations: Compass Media Networks; New York Jets Radio Network

Ownership
- Owner: Townsquare Media; (Townsquare Media of Albany, Inc.)
- Sister stations: WGNA-FM; WPBZ-FM; WQSH; WTMM-FM

History
- First air date: October 1996; (as WNYQ Queensbury); November 28, 2006; (as WBZZ in Malta)
- Former call signs: WWAZ (1993–1995); WSRQ (1995–1996); WNYQ (1996–2006); WBZZ (2006–2011); WQSH (2011–2019)

Technical information
- Licensing authority: FCC
- Facility ID: 6613
- Class: B1
- ERP: 7,100 watts
- HAAT: 860.0 meters (2,821.5 ft)
- Transmitter coordinates: 42.786°N 73.628°W
- Translator: HD2: 99.1 W256BU (Albany)
- Repeater: 103.5 WQSH (Cobleskill)

Links
- Public license information: Public file; LMS
- Webcast: Listen live; HD2: Listen live
- Website: q1057.com; HD2: hot991.com

WQBK-FM (105.7 MHz "Q105.7/103.5") is a commercial radio station licensed to Malta, New York, and serving the Capital District, New York. The station is owned by Townsquare Media, and simulcasts a classic rock radio format with co-owned 103.5 WQSH in Cobleskill. Its studios are on Kings Road in Schenectady. In morning drive time, WQBK-FM carries the syndicated Free Beer and Hot Wings Show. It also airs New York Jets football games.

WQBK-FM's transmitter is on Bald Mountain tower, in the Town of Brunswick, New York. WQBK-FM has an effective radiated power (ERP) of 7,100 watts.It broadcasts using HD Radio technology, with its HD2 digital subchannel carrying an urban contemporary format branded "Hot 99.1," which feeds 250-watt FM translator W256BU on 99.1 MHz.

== History ==
=== WNYQ Queensbury ===
After the passage of Federal Communications Commission Docket 80–90 in 1983, several broadcasters considered putting a new FM station in the Glens Falls-Lake George region. Around 1990, WENU owner Donald Heckman successfully petitioned the FCC to grant a 25,000-watt radio station to his hometown of Queensbury. Heckman-owned Bradmark Communications won the allocation in 1993, using the call sign WWAZ for the construction permit until 1995. It was WSRQ until June 1996, when its call letters became WNYQ. The station officially signed on the air in October 1996.

Bradmark acquired the station in November 1996, one month after the sign-on. WNYQ took over the adult contemporary format previously heard on WENU, using the branding Wink 105.7. From its launch, it aired local programming from 6:00 a.m. to 7:00 p.m. weekdays, with satellite programming fed from Westwood One nights and weekends.

In 2000, Bradmark Communications was sold to Vox Media, a growing owner of radio stations in small markets throughout New York and New England. Vox ended all satellite programming and decided to take WNYQ to a Hot AC approach, initially keeping the Wink 105.7 name. In early 2002, WNYQ rebranded as Q105.7, moving closer to Adult Top 40. Though initially successful, the station began to see its ratings decline due to competition from new rival WKBE and several out-of-market Top 40 stations, including WFLY and WZRT, with usable signals in WNYQ's signal area.

In 2004, Vox applied to move WNYQ's signal into the more lucrative Albany market, making it the second Bradmark/Vox station to do so. (WYAI, formerly WHTR in Corinth, was the first.) In December 2004, WNYQ flipped to a satellite-fed Classic Hits format while keeping the Q105.7 name, as Vox prepared for the station's relocation. The Classic Hits format remained on the 105.7 frequency until it signed off in May 2006, ahead of its relocation. The same format returned in September 2006 at 101.7 MHz (the former WENU, then WQYQ) in Hudson Falls.

=== Move to Malta ===
The move of 105.7 into the Capital District, originally applied for in 2004, went through several complications. Originally, the station had an FCC construction permit with a lease to broadcast from the Clifton Park tower used by WDCD-FM, WKKF, and WTMM-FM. When finally built, the present Bald Mountain site was selected with an upgrade to Class B1 status, even amid concerns that Bald Mountain might provide less-than-optimal coverage of some growing suburbs to the north of Albany.

When Vox sold the firm's remaining Glens Falls stations to Pamal Broadcasting in mid-2004, initially there was a clause that would allow Pamal to get the first rights to buy the 105.7 station as a move-in. This plan was slowed down by regulatory concerns with Pamal's revenue share in the adjacent Capital District and the potential that the signal that would have been sold if purchased (WZMR) would not able to find new ownership in the required amount of time.

=== Acquisition by Regent Communications ===
In June 2006, Regent Communications (now Townsquare Media) purchased the license of WNYQ to put it on the air.

In preparation of the move, Vox applied for the call letters WBZZ; that call sign took effect on September 21, 2006. After some delays, the station finally returned to the air from the Bald Mountain tower site on November 28, 2006, initially simulcasting WABT. It was during this time that the station began to refer to itself as Buzz 105.7. For the following week, DJs were frequently heard informing listeners to "make the switch," explaining that the old 104.5 frequency would no longer broadcast the format by the coming week. The station relaunched exclusively on 105.7 on December 4, 2006, with WABT flipping to ESPN Radio two weeks later as WTMM-FM.

=== Tweak to adult contemporary ===
On December 6, 2007, WBZZ changed its Hot AC format (which violated Regent-Clear Channel's non-compete agreement; WRVE also had a Hot AC format) to Mainstream adult contemporary. The call letters and the name Buzz 105.7 remained. While most of the jingles and imaging initially stayed from the previous format, WBZZ began airing new jingles in January 2008, better suited for an Adult Contemporary station.

In August 2008, the station changed its slogan from "Bright, Fresh, and Upbeat" under the Hot AC format, to "The Best Variety from Yesterday and Today" under the new Adult Contemporary format. By the end of 2009, the station began to lean a little bit more Hot AC than WYJB but still was mostly an Adult Contemporary station.

=== 105.7 Crush FM ===
On November 1, 2010, at Midnight, the station began stunting with Christmas music, WBZZ had been a Christmas music station in years past, and it is not unheard of for stations to change to Christmas music as early as November 1, so it was not initially obvious that WBZZ was planning a new format. The station announced a format change about a week before the launch of 105.7 Crush FM at midnight on January 3, 2011, with a 1990s hits format (similar to Clear Channel's Gen X Radio format) and the WQSH calls. The first song on "Crush FM" was "Get the Party Started" by P!nk.

In early October 2011, an FM translator on 99.1 FM, W256BU, went on the air. It began airing an urban contemporary format, branded "Hot 99.1," fed from the HD-2 subchannel on 105.7.

On September 7, 2012, at 5 pm, the station flipped to an Adult Top 40 format, branded as "PopCrush 105.7."

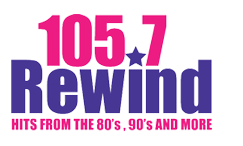
"Rewind 105.7" logo, 2015–2018

=== Rewind 105.7 ===
On March 4, 2015, WQSH dropped its adult CHR format and began stunting with Christmas music as "Santa 105.7," using the same bumpers that had been used in 2010. On March 12, 2015, at 7 am, the station flipped to a Generation X-based classic hits format (similar to the former "Crush FM" format), branded "Rewind 105.7."

=== Alt 105.7 ===
"Alt 105.7" logo, 2018–2019

On March 16, 2018, at 5 pm, after playing "Dancing in the Dark" by Bruce Springsteen, WQSH began stunting with Irish bands as "Shamrock 105.7." The station was rumored to be planning a flip to alternative rock as "Alt 105.7", as the domain name Alt1057Albany.com was registered by Townsquare in mid-February.

However, at the same time that WQSH began stunting, WINU flipped to the alternative format as "Alt 104.9", likely as a preemptive strike, which could require Townsquare to find a new format, or at least a different brand. However, on March 19, at midnight, WQSH still flipped to alternative, with the "Alt 105.7" branding. The first song on "Alt" was "All Mixed Up" by 311. With the shift of WQSH to alternative, sister stations WQBK-FM and WQBJ moved to classic rock.

Starting in the 2018 NFL season, WQSH began airing New York Jets football games whenever co-owned WTMM-FM had a conflict due to New York Yankees baseball. In the 2019 season, WQBK-FM became the primary New York Jets Radio Network affiliate in the Capital District.

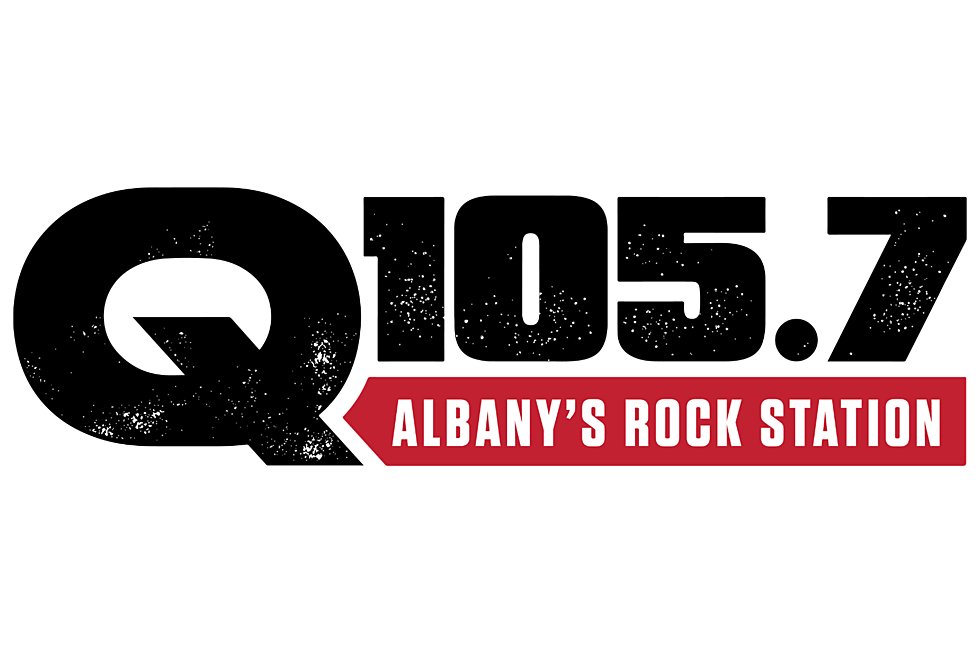
Q105.7 logo as an individual station.

=== Q105.7 ===
On July 1, 2019, at noon, WQSH changed its format to mainstream rock, which moved over from WQBK-FM and WQBJ, and rebranded as "Q105.7." The "Alt" format would return a month later on WQBJ, and would rebrand as "Alt 103.5."

On August 9, 2019, WQSH changed call letters to WQBK-FM, which were used since on 103.9 FM since 1972; subsequently, the call sign for 103.9 became WPBZ-FM, reflecting its new soft adult contemporary format, dubbed "The Breeze." Just over a month later, WQBJ would take on the WQSH call letters. The classic rock format and "Q" branding would return to 103.5 FM on September 3, 2021, with both WQBJ and WQSH continuing to simulcast.

== HD Radio ==
Upon WBZZ's move into the Albany market in 2006, the station was licensed for HD Radio operations. WQBK-FM currently operates one HD sub-channel, WQBK-HD2, which is also carried on FM translator W256BU, at 99.1 MHz. The translator signed on the air on March 6, 2012, first by stunting with construction sounds, then with protest songs as "Occupy 99.1." On March 9, at Midnight, the translator debuted a soft adult contemporary format, branded as "Sunny 99.1." The launch was promoted with a Facebook page. However, that also turned out to be a stunt; later that day, at 3 pm, the station adopted its present urban contemporary format as "Hot 99.1."
