= Sam DeLuca =

American football player and broadcaster (1936–2011)

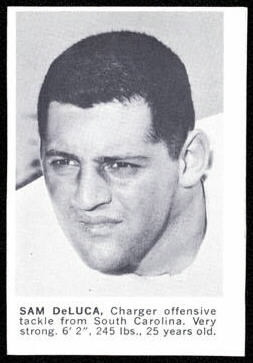

No. 63, 72, 60, 65
- Positions: Guard, tackle

Personal information
- Born: May 2, 1936; Brooklyn, New York, U.S.
- Died: September 13, 2011 (aged 75); Pelham, New York, U.S.
- Listed height: 6 ft 2 in (1.88 m)
- Listed weight: 250 lb (113 kg)

Career information
- High school: Lafayette (Brooklyn)
- College: South Carolina
- NFL draft: 1957: 2nd round, 23rd overall pick

Career history
- Toronto Argonauts (1957-1959); Los Angeles/San Diego Chargers (1960-1961, 1963); New York Jets (1964-1966)

Awards and highlights
- AFL champion (1963); Second-team All-ACC (1956)

Career AFL statistics
- Games played: 81
- Games started: 58
- Stats at Pro Football Reference

Saverio Frank "Sam" DeLuca (May 2, 1936 – September 13, 2011) was an American professional football offensive lineman in the American Football League (AFL) and later a radio and television football coverage broadcaster. He played six seasons, three for the Los Angeles/San Diego Chargers and three for the New York Jets. He was a member of the 1969 New York Jet Championship season on IR. After football, he had a long career in sports broadcasting. He was the color commentator on the Jets’ radio broadcasts on WABC and then WOR before working NFL telecasts for NBC Sports and on the Jets’ pre-season games in the 1970s and 1980s. He went to Lafayette High School (Brooklyn) with Sandy Koufax, Larry King and Fred Wilpon.

== Playing career ==
DeLuca was a three-year letterman in football at the University of South Carolina from 1954 through 1956. As a starting offensive tackle, he played for head coaches Rex Enright in his first two seasons and Warren Giese as a senior. DeLuca graduated with a Bachelor's degree in Education in 1957. He was inducted into the University of South Carolina Athletic Hall of Fame in 2005. He was also honored by the South Carolina Athletic Hall of Fame.

DeLuca was selected in the second round (23rd overall) by the New York Giants in the 1957 National Football League (NFL) draft. He signed with the Giants for US$7,000 a year with a $500 bonus. He was to have succeeded starting offensive lineman Bill Austin, who was strongly considering retirement at the time. When Austin decided to play one more year, DeLuca was sent to the Canadian Football League's Toronto Argonauts, where he spent three seasons from 1957 through 1959.

== Broadcasting career ==
DeLuca's first regular sportscasting assignment was hosting the pre- and postgame shows for New York Mets games on WABC-FM in 1968 and 1969. Phil Pepe, then a baseball writer for the Daily News who had graduated a year ahead of DeLuca at Lafayette High School, helped him prepare for the assignment.

== Death ==
DeLuca died at age 75 of pancreatic cancer at his home in Pelham, New York on September 13, 2011.

== See also ==
- List of American Football League players
