= WGDJ =

News/talk radio station in Rensselaer–Albany, New York

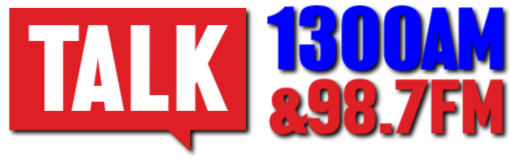
- Rensselaer, New York; United States
- Broadcast area: Capital District
- Frequency: 1300 kHz
- Branding: Talk 1300 AM & 98.7 FM

Programming
- Format: Talk
- Network: Townhall
- Affiliations: Fox News Talk; Genesis Communications Network; Salem Radio Network; USA Radio Network; Westwood One

Ownership
- Owner: Capital Broadcasting, Inc.

History
- First air date: December 3, 1981
- Former call signs: WEEE (1963-72); WQBK (1972-97); WTMM (1997–2007); WEEV (2007); WTMM (2007-08)
- Call sign meaning: The initials of the owner's children

Technical information
- Licensing authority: FCC
- Facility ID: 40768
- Class: B
- Power: 10,000 watts day; 8,000 watts night
- Translator: 98.7 W254DA (Albany)

Links
- Public license information: Public file; LMS
- Webcast: Listen live
- Website: www.talk1300.com

WGDJ (Talk 1300 AM) is a commercial radio station licensed to Rensselaer, New York, and serving the Capital District. It airs a talk radio format and is owned and operated by Capital Broadcasting, Inc. The transmitter is off River Road (New York State Route 9J) in Rensselaer. Programming is also heard in Albany and Rensselaer on 80-watt FM translator W254DA at 98.7 MHz.

WGDJ features local talk hosts in morning and afternoon drive times. Weekdays begin with "The Paul Vandenburgh Show". It is considered the longest running radio talk program in The Capital District. In afternoons, Jack Chatham hosts a local talk program. The rest of the weekday schedule is nationally syndicated conservative talk shows, including Mark Levin, Brian Kilmeade, Dan Bongino, Guy Benson, Rich Valdes, Red Eye Radio and First Light. Weekends feature shows on money, law, guns, home repair, car repair as well as a local swap and trade show. The station also features local news most hours on weekdays, with national updates from Townhall Radio News. Traffic and weather reports are presented by Spectrum News 1 Capital Region.

== History ==
=== Early years ===
On December 3, 1961, WEEE first signed on as a 5,000-watt daytimer radio station. The 1300 kHz frequency allocation was created for another station that was forced off the air a year earlier, 1280 WRSA in nearby Saratoga Springs. WEEE played country music, but always had trouble competing against more powerful and popular WOKO (now WOPG), the leading country station in the market. In 1970, WEEE was bought by People Communication and became WQBK, initially switching to a Top 40 sound, then trying a middle of the road. On December 1, 1972, an FM sister station signed on, WQBK-FM at 103.9 MHz, which mostly simulcast AM 1300, allowing listeners to hear WQBK day and night. After several years, People Communication decided to give the FM station its own separate format, progressive rock.

=== Switch to talk radio ===
With the FM station doing its own programming, People Communication moved WQBK to a full-time talk format, using news from United Press International. Then, in 1981, WQBK became a full-time station with 5,000 watts of nighttime power. Now able to stay on the air after sunset, WQBK became the New York Yankees radio network affiliate for the Capital District. With the exception of upstart WWCN from 1985 to 1987, WQBK was the only full-time talk radio station in the Albany area until WGY and WPTR (later WDCD, now defunct) moved to that format in the late 1990s. WQBK was the first talk station for Tom Leykis early in his career before he left for Miami. Also, market veterans Paul Vandenburgh (later of WROW, and current morning host at WGDJ) and Tom Mailey (who went on to WRGB) began their careers at the station. The talk format did well even against the larger signaled WPTR and the evolution of WGY to talk.

In 1996, WQBK-AM-FM were sold to Radio Enterprises, Inc., leading to drastic changes for cost savings. All local programming was quickly canceled, many of the staff fired, and sports contracts were terminated including the Yankees, hours before the first pitch of opening day. The new WQBK ran mostly syndicated programming from ABC Talk Radio and NBC Talknet, using hourly newscasts from CBS Radio News.

=== Becoming a sports station ===
In 1997, Radio Enterprises was purchased by Clear Channel Communications (which had owned a minority share). Noticing a steady performance by New York City sports radio pioneer WFAN, even in the Albany ratings 150 miles to the north, management decided to flip WQBK to become the first all-sports station in the market. The station took the call sign WTMM (referring to "Team") and began to acquire a number of play-by-play rights for regional sports teams. In the first year of its new format, much of WTMM's programming came from One-on-One Sports. In early 1998, WTMM became an affiliate of ESPN Radio. With the station's launch came the addition of play-by-play of Buffalo Bills football, Albany Firebirds arena football, College of Saint Rose athletics, and Union College men's hockey.

The station's biggest acquisition came in 2000 when the station returned to broadcasting New York Yankees baseball games, a fixture on the station during its time as WQBK. Later that year, Regent Communications purchased the station after Clear Channel divested several stations in the market and decided to launch its own sports talk station, WOFX. Regent made budget cuts, eliminating most of WTMM's non-ESPN programming including the "Albany Times Union Sports Minute" and all locally based play-by play. The station also lost its own sales staff, leading to commercial breaks being filled with public service announcements and ads sold on group deals. Some exceptions came when WTMM and sister station WABT aired Albany Conquest arena football games in 2004 and when the American Hockey League's Albany River Rats began airing their games on WTMM in 2006.

=== Female talk as WEEV ===
Regent's moved a new FM station on 105.7 MHz into the Albany market, sparking a realignment of its stations. With the new signal taking WABT's format, WTMM's all-sports format was moved to WABT's former home at 104.5 MHz. Prior to this move, Regent entered a deal with Greenstone Media to air that company's female-targeted talk radio programs, and in January 2007 the station became WEEV, Eve 1300 AM. However, Greenstone Media went out of business that August, and the station reverted to the WTMM call letters as an AM simulcast of WTMM-FM.

=== Return to talk radio ===
During 2007, Regent Communications began selling many of their smaller market and lower priority stations. Having lost its audience due to the Eve experiment, Regent decided to sell WTMM to Capital Broadcasting, Inc., with former WQBK host Paul Vandenburgh serving as its president and general manager. The price was $850,000. On November 26, 2007, Capital Broadcasting took control of the station from Regent and rolled out a talk radio format similar to the old WQBK, emphasizing local shows over nationally syndicated hosts.

Capital Broadcasting initially announced the new call letters for the station would be WCBI. However, Capital Broadcasting was unable to secure permission from Morris Multimedia, owner of WCBI-TV in Columbus, Mississippi, to share the WCBI call sign, and on February 14, 2008, the station instead changed its call letters to WGDJ. The call sign's origins are disputed. Claims have been made to it being the initials of former Albany Mayor Gerald D. Jennings, who had a regularly scheduled program on the station. However, sources at the station say it is actually the initials of the owner's children.

In November 2009, WGDJ boosted its power to 10,000 watts in the daytime and 8,000 watts at night. Also in 2009, Siena College began broadcasting its men's basketball games on WGDJ. On February 7, 2013, WGDJ announced that former House of Representatives member John E. Sweeney would host a show on the station. After local outcry and criticism against the station for employing Sweeney, Sweeney would quit the show two weeks later, citing schedule conflicts.

In March 2018, WGDJ added The Mark Levin Show to its lineup after the show was dropped by WGY. In 2021, it began airing The Dan Bongino Show after rival station WGY began airing The Clay Travis and Buck Sexton Show. Both shows occupy the same time slot formerly given to The Rush Limbaugh Show after Limbaugh's death.

== FM translator ==
WGDJ is rebroadcast on the FM band via translator station W254DA.

Broadcast translator for WGDJ
Call sign	Frequency	City of license	FID	ERP (W)	HAAT	Class	Transmitter coordinates	FCC info
W254DA	98.7 FM	Albany, New York	20922	80	0 m (0 ft)	D	42°47′9.3″N 73°37′41.4″W	LMS
