= Mass media in the Capital District (New York) =

The media in New York's Capital District is part of the Albany–Schenectady–Troy media market, which is the 59th largest in the United States. In terms of broadcast media, Albany is part of Arbitron market #63 (radio), and Nielsen DMA #57 (television), and is a broadcast market with historical relevance. The pioneering influence of General Electric in Schenectady directly contributed to the area emerging as the birthplace of station-based television (WRGB) and one of the earliest FM broadcast stations (today's WRVE), in addition to the first federally licensed radio station in upstate New York, WGY.

== Print ==
=== Newspaper ===
The Albany Times Union is area's primary daily newspaper; its headquarters moved to suburban Colonie from Albany in the 1970s, after a dispute with then-Mayor Erastus Corning 2nd over land needed for expansion. More localized are the Amsterdam Recorder for Montgomery and Fulton County; The Daily Gazette, which focuses primarily on Schenectady; The Daily Mail in Greene County; the Gloversville Leader-Herald for Fulton County; The Post-Star, which focuses on Washington, Warren, and northern Saratoga counties; the Troy Record, which focuses on Troy; the Register-Star for Columbia County; and The Saratogian, which focuses on Saratoga County.

Capital Region Independent Media operates community newspapers in 6 counties in Upstate NY, via 6 newspapers available in print and online. CRIM print newspapers reach an estimated 100K+ readers per month and over 250K with corresponding digital assets. Capital Region Independent Media's newspapers include The Columbia Paper (Columbia Co.), The Ravena News-Herald (Albany Co.), The Greenville Pioneer (Greene Co.), the Granville Sentinel (Washington Co.), the Whitehall Times (Washington Co.), and the Washington County Free Press (Washington Co., Rensselaer Co., and Saratoga Co.). The newspapers can be found online at TheUpStater.com and NYVTmedia.com.

=== Weekly ===
- Adirondack Moneysaver – Saratoga County free shopper's guide, with local merchant specials, classifieds, free non-profits
- The Business Review – a business weekly published each Friday
- Legislative Gazette – covers New York State politics; based in Albany
- Metroland – a free alternative / lifestyle newsweekly printed in Albany; publishes on Thursday
- Saratoga TODAY Newspaper – free news weekly printed by Saratoga Publishing, published every Friday for Saratoga Springs and surrounding communities
- Spotlight Newspapers – local news, events and classifieds printed in several different editions for select suburban towns in the Capital region
- Tuesday Edition – family-oriented events in and around the Capital District

=== Other ===
==== Campus publications ====
- Albany Student Press – published by the students of the University at Albany, SUNY
- The Chronicle – published by students at The College of Saint Rose; printed by The Daily Gazette; published every Tuesday during the school year
- Concordiensis – published by the students of Union College

== Radio ==
In 1947, this region was also home to the first independently owned and operated stand-alone FM radio station in the United States, W47A. In the early 2000s, the greater Albany market had the distinction of having the highest concentration of FM broadcast stations east of the Mississippi River.

=== AM stations ===
- 590 WROW Albany (Oldies)
- 810 WGY Schenectady (News/talk)
- 900 WABY Watervliet (Adult standards)
- 980 WOFX Troy (Sports/FSR)
- 1160 WSSV Mechanicville (Classic hits)
- 1240 WPTR Schenectady (Full-service/Classic rock and hits)
- 1300 WGDJ Rensselaer (Talk)
- 1330 WHAZ Troy (Christian)
- 1400 WAMC Albany (NPR/Northeast Public Radio/WAMC-FM simulcast)
- 1460 WOPG Albany (Catholic/EWTN/WOPG-FM simulcast)

=== FM stations ===
- 88.3 WVCR-FM Loudonville (College/Variety hits/Siena College)
- 89.1 WMHT-FM Schenectady (NPR/Classical)
- 89.7 WRUC Schenectady (College/Union College)
- 89.9 WOPG-FM Esperance (Catholic/EWTN)
- 90.3 WAMC-FM Albany (NPR/Northeast Public Radio)
- 90.7 WPGL Pattersonville (Christian/Sound of Life Radio)
- 90.9 WCDB Albany (College/UAlbany)
- 91.5 WRPI Troy (College/RPI)
- 92.3 WFLY Troy (CHR)
- 93.7 WYAI Scotia (Air1)
- 94.5 WYKV Ravena (K-Love)
- 95.5 WYJB Albany (Adult contemporary)
- 96.3 WAJZ Voorheesville (Rhythmic contemporary)
- 96.7 WMHH Clifton Park (Christian)
- 98.3 WTRY-FM Rotterdam (Oldies)
- 99.5 WRVE Schenectady (Hot AC)
- 100.9 WKLI-FM Albany (Country)
- 102.3 WKKF Ballston Spa (CHR)
- 103.1 WGY-FM Albany (News/talk/WGY simulcast)
- 103.9 WPBZ-FM Rensselaer (Soft AC)
- 104.5 WTMM-FM Mechanicville (Sports/ESPN)
- 104.9 WINU Altamont (Sports)
- 105.7 WQBK-FM Malta (Classic rock)
- 106.5 WPYX Albany (Classic rock)
- 107.7 WGNA-FM Albany (Country)

=== Low-power FM stations and translators ===
- 92.7 WOOG-LP Troy (Community)
- 93.9 W230DK Albany (Adult standards/WABY simulcast)
- 94.9 W235AY Albany (Christian/WFGB simulcast)
- 95.9 W240EC Albany (Sports/FSR/WOFX simulcast)
- 97.5 W248AX Albany (Christian/WNGN simulcast)
- 98.7 W254DA Albany (Talk/WGDJ simulcast)
- 99.1 W256BU Albany (Urban contemporary/WQBK-HD2 simulcast)
- 99.9 W260CH Albany (Country/WRVE-HD2 simulcast)
- 100.5 W263CG Albany (Oldies/WROW simulcast)
- 105.3 WOOC-LP Troy (Christian)
- 106.9 WOOA-LP Albany (Community)
- 107.3 WCAA-LP Albany (Community)

== Television ==
WRGB has the distinction of being the very first affiliate of the NBC television network. The Albany TV DMA is served by the following stations, providing programming from many of the English-language American broadcast television networks. There are currently no local affiliates for any of the Spanish-language domestic broadcast television networks; however, the national service of Univision is provided via cable TV. Unlike many television markets around the country, TV stations from neighboring markets cannot normally be received in the greater Albany area due to distance and terrain.

=== Full-power ===
- 6 WRGB Schenectady (CBS)
- 10 WTEN Albany (ABC)
- 13 WNYT Albany (NBC)
- 17 WMHT Schenectady (PBS)
- 23 WXXA-TV Albany (Fox)
- 45 WCWN Schenectady (The CW)
- 51 WNYA Pittsfield, MA (Independent with MyNetworkTV)
- 55 WYPX-TV Amsterdam (Ion Television)

=== Low-power ===
- 14 WYBN-LD Windham
- 15 WEPT-CD Kinderhook
- 58 W58CX Saratoga Springs (3ABN)

Charter Communications also provides a local 24-hour rolling news service to its subscribers, Spectrum News Capital Region (formerly Capital News 9) on cable channel 9.
