= WGY =

WGY may refers to these radio stations in Upstate New York, United States:

- WGY (AM), Schenectady
- WGY-FM, Albany
- WRVE, Schenectady (WGY-FM 1988–1994)
