= WTRY =

WTRY may refer to:

- WTRY-FM, a radio station (98.3 FM) licensed to serve Rotterdam, New York, United States
- WOFX (AM), a radio station (980 AM) licensed to serve Troy, New York, which held the call sign WTRY from 1940 to September 2000
- WPYX, a radio station (106.5 FM) licensed to serve Albany, New York, which held the call sign WTRY-FM from 1971 to 1973
- Wilmington Terminal Railroad
