= WOPG =

WOPG may refer to:

- WOPG (AM), a radio station (1460 AM) licensed to Albany, New York, United States
- WOPG-FM, a radio station (89.9 FM) licensed to Esperance, New York, United States
