= 1928 in television =

The year 1928 in television involved some significant events. Below is a list of television-related events during 1928.

== Global television events ==
Month	Day	Event
January	13	Dr. Ernst Frederik Werner Alexanderson performs the first successful public television broadcast. The pictures, with 48 lines at 16 frames per second, are received on sets with 1.5 sq. inch screens in the homes of four General Electric executives in Schenectady, New York. The sound is transmitted by the WGY radio station.
February	09	John Logie Baird transmits television pictures across the Atlantic. The pictures are transmitted from Motograph House, London by telephone cable to Ben Clapp's station GK2Z at 40 Warwick Road, Coulsdon, Surrey, and then by radio to Hartsdale, New York, United States.
June	12	The first outside broadcast is made by John Logie Baird on his roof in 133 Long Acre, London, featuring the actor Jack Buchanan.
July	02	Charles Francis Jenkins begins thrice-weekly television broadcasts in Washington, D.C., transmitting silhouette motion pictures. Station W3XK broadcasts from 8 to 9 p.m. on Monday, Wednesday, and Friday nights, testing on 46.72 metres for distance reception and on 186 metres locally.
July	03	John Logie Baird demonstrates a colour television system achieved by using a scanning disc with spirals of red, green and blue filters at the transmitting and receiving ends.
August	14	Hugo Gernsback's radio station, WRNY (New York City) begins a regular, if limited, schedule of live television broadcasts, using a mechanical system developed by a South-American inventor. It transmits 48-line images.
September	1	Philo Farnsworth demonstrates his image dissector camera and "oscillite" tube receiver for the press, with the transmission of motion picture clips, described by a reporter as "a queer looking little image in bluish light now, one that frequently smudges and blurs." It is the first public demonstration of an all-electronic television system.
September	11	The first broadcast of a play by television, melodrama The Queen's Messenger, on General Electric's W2XAD from Schenectady, New York, utilising techniques created by Ernst Alexanderson. Three electromechanical cameras are used.

== Births ==
Date	Name	Notability
January 5	Walter Mondale	U.S. politician (died 2021)
January 7	Ante Garmaz	Argentine actor, fashion designer, television presenter and model (died 2011)
January 8	Sander Vanocur	U.S. television journalist (died 2019)
January 11	Mitchell Ryan	U.S. actor (Dark Shadows) (died 2022)
January 20	Peter Donat	Canadian-American actor (Flamingo Road, The X-Files) (died 2018)
February 1	Stuart Whitman	U.S. actor (Cimarron Strip) (died 2020)
February 11	Conrad Janis	U.S. jazz musician and actor (Mork & Mindy) (died 2022)
February 13	Gerald Fried	U.S. composer (died 2023)
February 22	Bruce Forsyth	English entertainer and presenter (Sunday Night at the London Palladium, The Generation Game) (died 2017)
February 29	Joss Ackland	English actor (died 2023)
February 29	Irene Sunters	Actress (died 2005)
March 20	Fred Rogers	U.S. television personality and musician (Mr. Rogers' Neighborhood) (died 2003)
April 1	George Grizzard	U.S. actor (Law & Order) (died 2007)
April 4	Estelle Harris	U.S. actress (Seinfeld) (died 2022)
April 7	James Garner	U.S. film and television actor (Maverick, The Rockford Files) (died 2014)
April 23	Bill Cotton	British executive, controller of BBC One (1977–1981), managing director of BBC Television (1981–1987) (died 2008)
May 23	Jeannie Carson	English-born U.S. actress (Search for Tomorrow, Hey, Jeannie!)
May 23	Nigel Davenport	Actor (died 2013)
June 4	Ruth Westheimer	Talk show host (died 2024)
June 20	Martin Landau	U.S. actor (Mission: Impossible) (died 2017)
July 1	Birgitta Ulfsson	Finnish actress (Mumintrollet) (died 2017)
July 13	Bob Crane	U.S. disc jockey and actor (Hogan's Heroes) (died 1978)
July 15	Tom Troupe	U.S. actor
July 22	Orson Bean	U.S. actor (Dr. Quinn, Medicine Woman) (died 2020)
August 10	Eddie Fisher	Actor (died 2010)
August 17	Willem Duys	Dutch radio and television presenter (died 2011)
September 1	George Maharis	U.S. actor (Route 66)
September 19	Adam West	U.S. actor (Batman) (died 2017)
September 23	Roger Grimsby	U.S. actor (died 1995)
September 28	Robert Chandler	U.S. television executive (died 2008)
October 17	Don Collier	U.S. actor (Outlaws) (died 2021)
October 25	Hal Bruno	U.S. journalist (ABC News) (died 2011)
October 25	Marion Ross	U.S. actress (Happy Days)
October 25	Anthony Franciosa	U.S. actor (died 2006)
November 11	Sanford Socolow	U.S. broadcast journalist (died 2015)
December 10	Dan Blocker	U.S. actor (Bonanza) (died 1972)
December 16	Terry Carter	U.S. actor (McCloud) (died 2024)
December 17	George Lindsey	U.S. actor (The Andy Griffith Show) (died 2012)
December 28	Bill Cardille	U.S. broadcast personality (died 2016)
December 29	Bernard Cribbins	English actor (died 2022)

== Deaths ==
- December 19 - J. Hartley Manners, 58, author of the first TV drama The Queen's Messenger
