= The Latin Alternative =

Public radio show

- Home station: WEXT, Troy, New York
- Hosted by: Josh Norek and Ernesto Lechner
- Original release: 2009
- Website: www.wextradio.org/show/the-latin-alternative
- Podcast: www.npr.org/podcasts/542771035/the-latin-alternative

The Latin Alternative is a nationally syndicated public radio program in the United States focused on latin alternative, Latin rock, indie, Latin hip-hop, tropical music, Latin funk and other left of center Latin music genres. The weekly show is co-hosted by entrepreneur Josh Norek (co-founder of the Latin Alternative Music Conference and Nacional Records, current president of Regalias Digitales) and journalist Ernesto Lechner (Rolling Stone, LA Times and author of the book Rock en Español: The Latin Rock Explosion).

The Latin Alternative launched in 2009 and is the first syndicated English-language public radio show focused on Latin Alternative music. The program airs weekly on 55 public radio stations and is produced by WEXT (Troy, NY), with national distribution via Public Radio Exchange. Affiliates include KCSN (Los Angeles), WXPN (Philadelphia, KXT (Dallas) and WMFE (Orlando).

In 2013, The Latin Alternative entered into a partnership with Cal State University Northridge (CSUN) station KCSN to help launch the first 24-hour Latin Alternative format station, airing on KCSN HD2. The KCSN HD2 channel's music programming was initially overseen by co-host Josh Norek, with CSUN students eventually taking over the day to day programming.

The program has hosted takeover episodes with many of the Latin Alternative music genre's biggest artists. Past guests include icons like Calle 13, Cafe Tacuba, Carlos Santana, Eddie Palmieri, Los Lobos and Ozomatli as well as newer acts like Ana Tijoux, Alex Cuba, Cimafunk and The Warning. In 2019 The Latin Alternative celebrated its 300th episode. In 2024, the show celebrated its fifteen year anniversary with a special takeover episode featuring Chicano Batman.
