= WDDY =

WDDY may refer to:

- WDDY-LD, a low-power television station (channel 15, virtual 5) licensed to serve Jackson, Tennessee, United States
- WOPG (AM), a radio station (1460 AM) licensed to serve Albany, New York, United States, which held the call sign WDDY from 2002 to 2014
