= Don Weeks =

American Radio Talk Show Host

- Born: Donald Weeks; November 23, 1938; New York, U.S.
- Died: March 11, 2015 (aged 76); Niskayuna, New York, U.S.
- Occupation: News anchor
- Employer: WGY
- Spouse: Suzanne McGee (m. 1960)

Donald E. Weeks (November 23, 1938 — March 11, 2015) was an American radio personality. He was the longtime host of the WGY Morning News on news-talk radio station 810 WGY in Schenectady, New York. Prior to working for WGY, Weeks was a weather forecaster for WAST-TV (now NBC network affiliate WNYT in Albany) and a DJ for Top 40 station WTRY, now sports station WOFX.

Weeks joined WGY as a morning host in 1980 and spent 30 years in that role. He won numerous accolades, including the NAB Marconi Award for Medium Market Personality of the Year in 2005. Weeks was also inducted into the New York State Broadcasters Association Hall of Fame in 2009.

On June 15, 2010, Weeks announced his retirement after a half-century on the radio.

Weeks died at home in Niskayuna, New York, on March 11, 2015. The cause was a rare autoimmune disorder and cancer.
