= WVCR-FM =

- Loudonville, New York; United States
- Broadcast area: Capital District
- Frequency: 88.3 MHz
- Branding: 88.3 The Saint

Programming
- Format: Variety hits

Ownership
- Owner: Siena College

History
- First air date: 1960
- Former frequencies: 89.1 MHz (1960–1970)
- Call sign meaning: W Voice of College Radio; W Voice of the Capital Region

Technical information
- Licensing authority: FCC
- Facility ID: 60295
- Class: B1
- ERP: 2,800 watts
- HAAT: 256 metres (840 ft)
- Transmitter coordinates: 42°38′13.00″N 74°0′5.00″W

Links
- Public license information: Public file; LMS
- Webcast: Listen live (via iHeartRadio)
- Website: www.wvcr.com

WVCR-FM (88.3 The Saint) is a variety hits radio station located in Loudonville, New York, owned by Siena College, and primarily staffed by students from the college. The station broadcasts on 88.3 MHz at an effective radiated power of 2,800 watts from the Helderberg Mountains in the Town of New Scotland. In addition to simulcast programming at www.wvcr.com, WVCR is perhaps the only non-commercial licensee to emulate the variety hits format made popular by the Jack FM approach in the Capital Region. The format is very popular in the region with a very diverse selection from classic 1960s hits to current hits of today—something of a 2,800 Watt iPod for Baby Boomers.

Unlike many Variety Hits stations, WVCR's Variety Hits format contains DJs that interact with listeners, and identify songs played on the station.

In addition, the station frequently makes uses of jingles to identify themselves. This is a somewhat uncommon practice among stations with this format.

On Sundays, WVCR breaks its format for a day of block programming known as Saint Sundays. The programming during this period includes Power & Praise, The Catholic Chorale, Polka Spotlight (as of 2024 it has been airing in its current iteration for 35 years; in addition, a Polish music program has been a continuous music staple on WVCR for 50 years as of February 2025). Reilly on the Radio (which plays songs requested by listeners and includes "classic" music selections going back to the 1940s), and DeSelecciones (celebrating its 37th year on WVCR in May 2024). The station also broadcasts Siena women's basketball games.

== History ==
During the Fall semester of 1959, three Siena students envisioned a college radio station that would serve the resident students and faculty. Carrier current transmitters were built and installed in the faculty residence and the student residence. The station began broadcasting, using the call sign WVCR (Voice of Collegiate Radio). Although the station only broadcast for six to twelve hours a day, until the end of the spring semester, it was so well received by both students and faculty, that Siena College formally approved the station concept, supported extending its broadcast area to the surrounding community, and provided new broadcast studios in Plassmann Hall.

During the spring semester of 1960, WVCR-FM started broadcasting on 89.1 MHz with the purpose of bringing campus news and sports to the off-campus student body (in those days, about 80% of the student body). The station operated with a Class D license from a tower on the Siena campus. The station broadcast a mixed format. The carrier current AM station continued broadcasting, mostly simulcasting the FM signal, but at times broadcasting material that was not intended for the FM outlet. Basketball games, the basis for continued funding by the college, were always broadcast over both AM and FM outlets.

In 1970, PBS station WMHT obtained a full-power construction permit for the 89.1 frequency, paying WVCR to vacate the frequency. With WMHT's help, WVCR would relocate to 88.3 MHz in time for the 1971–72 academic year, upgrading to Class A status with a 360W transmitted signal from Pinnacle Mountain in New Scotland, NY. It was at this time WVCR adopted a more eclectic format common of college radio.

Although the additional height of the Pinnacle Mountain site opened up the possibility of greatly expanded coverage, the WVCR signal was too weak to be reliably received throughout much of the Capital District and especially the Siena College campus. The situation was further worsened by WVCR's failure to transmit in stereo, with stereo broadcasts finally beginning in 1987. As a result, the station experienced a gradual decline in listenership and member morale throughout the late 1970s and early 1980s.

1985 saw a major change at WVCR as a planned dormitory renovation at Plassman Hall forced WVCR to relocate to all new studios across campus. To accomplish this, WVCR-FM spent most of the 1985–86 academic year off the air with the new facilities debuting in December 1986. The relaunch of the station provided the opportunity for a fresh start, and the new student members made many major upgrades to the signal, with the adoption of stereo in 1987, a newer vintage transmitter and antenna in 1988, and the upgrade from class A to B1 status (25000 watts equivalent) in 1989. By 1989, the signal could reliably be received on campus for the first time since 1970. An additional power increase took place in Jan 2001 to bring the signal to its current level or 35,000 watts.

As the 1990s started, the number of genres on WVCR declined as student interest in the station began to go towards two genres of music, heavy metal and urban contemporary, both underrepresented in the Albany market. By 1995, WVCR's schedule outside of Sundays was made solely of programming in those two formats. In 1996, the heavy metal programming was replaced prior to the 1997–98 academic year by alternative rock, a decision that was made without the knowledge of the executive board, and without any public forum. Many local listeners had felt slighted by the process, as the station had recently completed a 'Listener Appeal" to raise the necessary funds to replace the station's aging transmitter. This arrangement would remain in place until the end of the Fall semester of the 1998–99 academic year.

On December 27, 1998, WVCR axed all rock programming and took on a Rhythmic Top 40 format, a move done in rapid response to the launch of then-urban contemporary WAJZ. With this move came an upgrade of studio equipment and the expansion of WVCR to a 24-hour broadcast day; previously, it had signed off from 12:00-6:00 am. WVCR relaunched as a Mainstream Top 40 station in September 2001.

Popular on campus, WVCR's Top 40 format struggled to get some traction going against the more established WFLY and the seemingly Rhythmic WKKF. The redundancy of the station in the market and the support of the station in the community paling in comparison to past formats led Siena to switch the format to variety hits on April 9, 2006.

In October 2007, two new programs were introduced to Saturday music listeners. Moments To Remember, a live all-request program, hosted by Siena Alum Brian Donovan and featuring popular music from the 1950s to 1980s debuted. And Crossroads of Jazz, hosted by Darrin Scott and Ted Moisides kicked off Saturday afternoon programming.

As of March 29, 2008, WVCR began broadcasting a show that showcases Japanese Popular Music (J-Pop). The show which is entitled "The J-Pop Exchange" is produced and hosted by "SeanBird", one of WVCR's On-Air personalities.

WVCR is an affiliate of the syndicated Pink Floyd show "Floydian Slip," as well as the New York State Capitol Region affiliate of the WCNY-FM-produced Capitol Pressroom, a daily news program concerning daily governmental happenings affecting NYS residents.

WVCR-FM continues to be a community leader in the Albany, Schenectady & Troy, N.Y. market while also broadcasting to the neighboring states Vermont & Massachusetts. As of August 2006 Darrin Scott Kibbey serves as General Manager.

== See also ==
- College radio
- List of college radio stations in the United States
