= The Queen's Messenger =

1928 television film by Mortimer Stewart

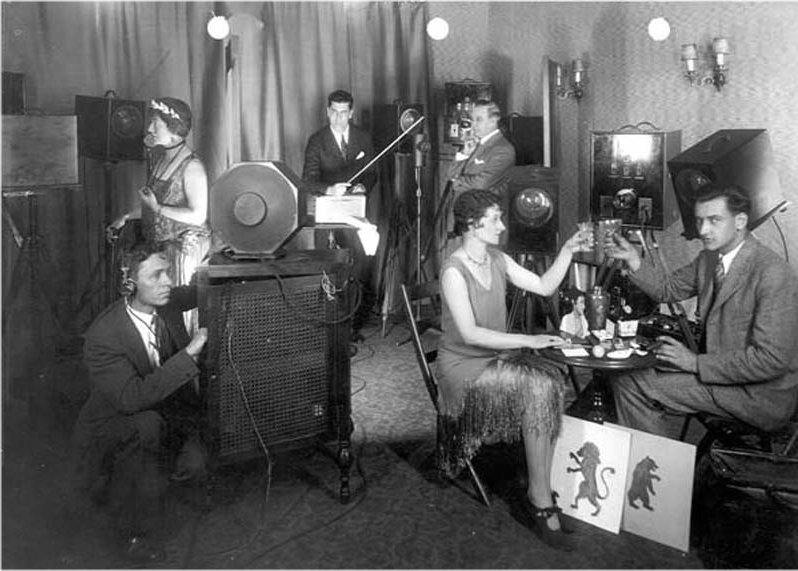
- Play scene set with actors
- Genre: Drama
- Developed by: Ernst Alexanderson (consulting engineer)
- Story by: J. Hartley Manners
- Directed by: Mortimer Stewart
- Starring: Izetta Jewel, Maurice Randall
- Original language: English

Production
- Production location: Schenectady, New York
- Camera setup: multiple-camera setup
- Running time: 40 minutes
- Production company: General Electric

Original release
- Network: W2XAD
- Release: September 11, 1928

The Queen's Messenger was the first television drama. The experiment was broadcast by a Schenectady, New York station on September 11, 1928. It was a radio drama adapted for television and broadcast both sound and moving pictures. These were received by televisions three inches (76 mm) in diameter that were set up in various places all around the city. There were special effect props for this broadcast to enhance the actors' performance and their sounds.

== Background ==
The 1928 one act play written by J. Hartley Manners was the first television drama. It was a radio drama adapted for television. It was made for television in 1928 by station "WGY Television" (W2XAD) using a multiple-camera setup and was an experimental broadcast on September 11 at 1:30 p.m. and 11:30 p.m. The cameras picked up the stage movement action and microphones collected the sound. The television signal was received at a receiving station three miles away, and received much publicity. It was broadcast three years ahead of radio's first soap opera.

The teleplay starred retired actress Izetta Jewell. It was noted by the viewers that in the television receivers she appeared trimmer than in real life and that television made a person look slimmer and younger. The Brooklyn Daily Eagle newspaper in an article at the time observed that even the heavy set opera singer Ernestine Schumann-Heink would look like a charming slender woman if on television. The co-star of the television play was Maurice Randall, appearing as a John Bull-type Englishman.

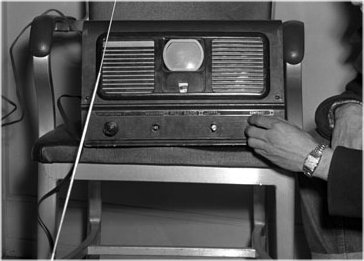
Three inch (76 mm) early television receiver

== Plot ==
A British diplomat has a romantic encounter with a mysterious Russian woman who is secretly trying to obtain secret papers he is carrying in his dispatch case for the queen. The old spy melodrama was selected because it had just two actors and they could alternately select the three television cameras between them and the scene props.

== Television receivers ==
The televised play was received on televisions that were octagonally shaped and about ten inches (250 mm) high and four inches (100 mm) in depth. The front panel upper part had a three inch square aperture through which the moving picture was viewed. There were knobs on the lower part which controlled how the radio signals for the television part were received.

Six televisions were set up around the WGY studios and connected by closed-circuit television for newspaper journalists. There were television receivers set up in the transmitting control rooms that received the signal from the air that was broadcast several miles away.

== Special effects ==
Special techniques had to be devised to show the action movements on a three inch television screen. One was where the likeness of a character was shown to the audience instead of the real person. The facial movements of this figure were then presented in sync with the sound of the spoken parts. This sound part came from a separate radio receiver, that was placed under the television receiver.

To show the action parts of the play, special effect props were developed. One example was where the Queen's messenger took a drink of wine – a wine glass appeared and a liquid poured into it from a long-neck bottle. Other props used for the play were watch dials, keys, revolvers, and stacks of documents. The stage for the play consisted of three spotlights, three scanning machines, three microphones, background scenes and other apparatus. The stage coordinator for these props was Mortimer Stewart.

== Drawbacks ==
The transmission was a test of General Electric's 48-line television system and lasted 40 minutes. Ernst Alexanderson was the electrical engineer that developed the mechanics of coordinating the sound and moving images that was the beginning of the "radio movie" that developed into the soap opera. The received radio drama play tended to shift to the right or left of the center of the television screen. This was due to the variation in the speed of the motor used to drive the scanning disc that received the image on the stage. The pictures at the receiving end also flickered somewhat, similarly to the hand-cranked silent films presented at theaters at the time.

== See also ==
- Queen's Messenger

== Sources ==
- Kisseloff, Jeff (1997). The Box: An Oral History of Television, 1920–1961. Penguin Books. ISBN 978-0-14-025265-1. "In 1928, the station received gobs of publicity when it broadcast the first television drama, J. Hartley Manner's 'The Queen's Messenger.'"
