= WFNP =

- Rosendale, New York; United States
- Broadcast area: Mid-Hudson
- Frequency: 88.7 MHz (timeshare with WRHV-FM)
- Branding: The Edge

Programming
- Language: English
- Format: College radio

Ownership
- Owner: State University of New York at New Paltz

History
- First air date: September 1, 1990; 35 years ago
- Call sign meaning: "Radio Free New Paltz"

Technical information
- Licensing authority: FCC
- Facility ID: 63126
- Class: A
- ERP: 230 watts
- HAAT: 393 meters (1,289 ft)
- Transmitter coordinates: 41°43′9.3″N 73°59′45.5″W

Links
- Public license information: Public file; LMS
- Webcast: Listen live
- Website: wfnp.org

WFNP (88.7 MHz FM) is a college radio station licensed to Rosendale, New York. The station, which is run by students at State University of New York at New Paltz, broadcasts at 6 kilowatts ERP from a tower on Illinois Mountain in nearby Lloyd, New York.

WFNP is one of a handful of time-share FM stations remaining in the United States; since its 1990 sign-on it has shared the 88.7 frequency with WRHV (originally WMHX-FM), a simulcast of classical-formatted WMHT-FM Schenectady. WFNP-FM is on the air from 7:00 pm–5:00 a.m. weeknights and 10:00 p.m.–5:00 a.m. weekends while school is in session (September 1 to November 30 and February 1 until April 30). Since the mid-1990s, WFNP has looked to find its own frequency and explored various options.

Though WFNP signed on in 1990, the station has been on in some form since 1971 when it began as a carrier current AM station heard solely on campus, which went by the name WNPC, and later WRNP (for Radio New Paltz) on 640 AM. After the launch of the WFNP (FM), the AM remained on the air with its own programming by day and an FM simulcast by night. WFNP (AM) lasted until the early 2000s when it was succeeded by the combination of a webcast and a simulcast on WNPC, the campus TV station. As a tip to its heritage, the non-FM programming is referred to as "the AM station".

From the late 1970s to around 1980, the station used the callsign WRSW, until student management realized there was already a real WRSW licensed to Warsaw, Indiana. In addition to being heard in the dorms on 640 AM, local cable TV subscribers could get the station on 91.9 FM if they connected their cable to their home stereo receiver. During the spring of 1980, new student management began to explore the possibility of an actual FM station. In the fall of 1980, a petition was circulated on campus, and student government came up with the funds necessary to perform a frequency search for the new station. A company known as Educational FM associates did the search for a fee of $1,800.00. A copy of the petition (the actual roots of today's WFNP) will be posted at a later date.

Some key student personnel from those early days include Dennis O'Keefe, who later became a campus librarian -and whose name adorns a bench outside Sojourner Truth library in his memory; passionate Beatles fan and music director Nelson Metviner (who was memorialized after being killed in an auto accident with a plaque that hung in the station office for many years), engineer Alex Abrash, Tim Cook, Chuck Grant, Nathan "Nato" Mishan, Robin Milling, and general manager Jeff Jensen. It took several more years for the station to finally reach the goal of being an over-the-air FM radio station.

== See also ==
- College radio
- List of college radio stations in the United States
