= WRHV =

Part-time simulcast of WMHT-FM, Schenectady, NY
- Poughkeepsie, New York; United States
- Broadcast area: Mid-Hudson Valley
- Frequency: 88.7 MHz
- Branding: Classical WMHT FM

Programming
- Format: Classical music
- Affiliations: NPR

Ownership
- Owner: WMHT Educational Telecommunications

History
- First air date: November 1989
- Former call signs: WMHX-FM (1989–1990)
- Call sign meaning: RHV = phonetic spelling of (Hudson) River

Technical information
- Licensing authority: FCC
- Facility ID: 73265
- Class: A
- ERP: 230 watts
- HAAT: 393 meters (1,289 ft)
- Transmitter coordinates: 41.719°N 73.996°W

Links
- Public license information: Public file; LMS
- Webcast: Listen live
- Website: classicalwmht.org

WRHV (88.7 FM) is a noncommercial radio station licensed to Poughkeepsie, New York, United States, and serving the Mid-Hudson Valley. The station is owned by WMHT Educational Telecommunications and is a satellite of Schenectady station WMHT-FM, relaying their classical music format. WRHV transmits from the main Illinois Mountain tower in the town of Lloyd, New York.

WRHV, which signed on in November 1989 as WMHX-FM (sharing the calls of WMHT's secondary television station for the first year of its existence), is involved in one of the few remaining timeshare arrangements on radio in the United States. The 88.7 frequency is shared between WRHV and SUNY New Paltz-owned WFNP. Currently, WRHV is on the air at the following times from September 1 to December 1, and February 1 to May 1:

- Weekdays from 5 a.m. to 7 p.m.
- Saturdays from 5 a.m. to 9 p.m.
- Sundays from 5 a.m. to 10 p.m.

When SUNY New Paltz is either not in session, in exams, or in start-of-semester preparation, WRHV is heard around the clock. Nevertheless, the timeshare arrangement has had its critics on both sides and as a result WFNP-FM has proposed a move to 98.9 MHz where its programming would be heard full-time with WRHV becoming the sole occupant of the 88.7 MHz frequency.

== See also ==
- List of NPR stations
- List of radio stations in New York
