= WMHT-FM =

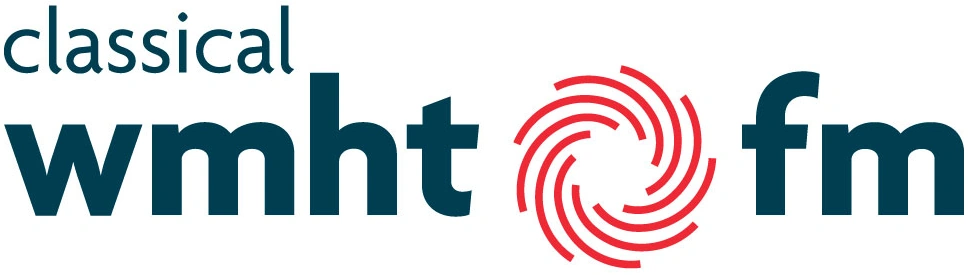
- Schenectady, New York; United States
- Broadcast area: Capital District
- Frequency: 89.1 MHz (HD Radio)
- Branding: Classical WMHT FM

Programming
- Format: Classical music
- Subchannels: HD2: Adult album alternative (WEXT)
- Affiliations: NPR

Ownership
- Owner: WMHT Educational Telecommunications
- Sister stations: WMHT; WEXT

History
- First air date: June 8, 1972
- Call sign meaning: Mohawk–Hudson Television (from WMHT-TV)

Technical information
- Licensing authority: FCC
- Facility ID: 73266
- Class: B
- ERP: 6,100 watts
- HAAT: 361 meters (1,184 ft)
- Transmitter coordinates: 42.6253°N 74.0101°W
- Translator: HD2: 106.1 W291BY (Albany)
- Repeater: Part-time: 88.7 WRHV (Poughkeepsie)

Links
- Public license information: Public file; LMS
- Webcast: Listen live
- Website: classicalwmht.org

WMHT-FM (89.1 FM) is a non-commercial radio station licensed to Schenectady, New York, United States, and serving the Capital District of New York. Co-owned with PBS member station WMHT (channel 17), the station has a classical music format along with some assorted public radio shows from NPR, APM and PRX. WMHT-FM's transmitter is located on the Helderberg Escarpment antenna farm on Pinnacle Road in New Salem, New York. WMHT-FM broadcasts using HD Radio technology.

WMHT-FM programming is also heard on a part-time basis on WRHV in Poughkeepsie, which is involved in one of the last radio timeshare arrangements in the United States alongside State University of New York at New Paltz-owned WFNP-FM. From October 2005 to March 2006, WMHT-FM programming was also heard on co-owned WBKK in Amsterdam. That station now airs an adult album alternative format, also heard on WMHT-FM's HD2 digital subchannel.

== History ==
From its founding in 1972, WMHT-FM has been a classical music station. The plans for the format came into being in the wake of WFLY leaving the classical format in 1969 and an ensuing protest from prominent members of the community. Although a number of PBS stations were launching sister NPR news and information stations, the presence of NPR affiliate 90.3 WAMC in Albany kept WMHT from such an opportunity.

WMHT decided to go in a different direction by launching a classical station. WMHT paid Siena College-owned WVCR-FM to vacate its 89.1 frequency, switching to 88.3 MHz. On June 8, 1972, WMHT-FM officially signed on the air. Because the WMHT call sign, which stood for "Mohawk–Hudson Television", was already established for Channel 17, the FM station took the same call letters. The Mohawk-Hudson Council on Educational Television was the original name of the organization that put Channel 17 on the air.

WMHT-FM's signature program is "Bach's Lunch," a program originally conceived by Pam Mittendorff and Chris Wienk of WSHU-FM in Fairfield, Connecticut. Wienk brought the program to WMHT-FM after it stopped airing on WSHU-FM.

In July 2007, WMHT launched Amsterdam-licensed WEXT (97.7), branded as "Exit 97.7", after the purchase of the commercial license for WBKK, which removed the station's main competitor in the market. WEXT currently runs a non-commercial adult album alternative (AAA) format, along with a focus on local Capital Region artists.

== Original programming ==
- Bach's Lunch: A program of Baroque music airing on weekdays at noon. The host is Chris Wienk.
- WMHT Live: A full-length concert program featuring recordings of recent classical concerts in the Capital District.
- No Ticket Required: A program of concert excerpts featuring recordings of recent classical concerts in the Capital District.
- Serenade: A program of classical music featuring nocturnes, adagios and andantes produced by Wayne Henning.

== RISE ==
WMHT also provides an information service for those who are blind and "print-disabled" known as RISE, which has been in operation since 1978. RISE programming is on the subcarriers of both WMHT-FM and WRHV-FM (even when WRHV-FM is not on the air).

== See also ==
- WMHT (TV)
