= Izetta Jewel =

American actress

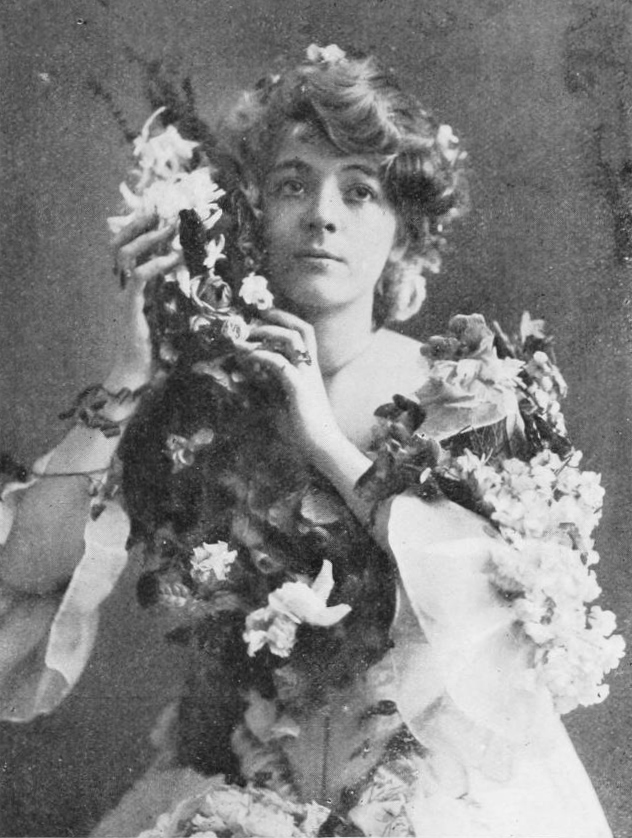
- Jewel c. 1903
- Born: Izetta Jewel Kenney; November 24, 1883; Hackettstown, New Jersey, U.S.A.
- Died: November 14, 1978 (aged 94); La Jolla, California, U.S.A.
- Other names: Izetta Jewel Brown; Izetta Jewel Miller
- Occupations: Stage actress, politician, women's rights activist, radio personality
- Spouse(s): William Gay Brown Jr. (1914–1916; his death); Hugh Miller (1927–1965; his death)

Izetta Jewel Kenney (November 24, 1883 – November 14, 1978) was an American stage actress, women's rights activist and politician. She became the first woman to deliver a seconding speech for a presidential nominee at a major American political party convention when she seconded the nomination of John W. Davis at the 1924 Democratic National Convention.

== Early life and stage career ==
Izetta Jewel Kenney was born in Hackettstown, New Jersey, the daughter of Cornelius Cook and Elizabeth (née Denno) Kenney. Her father was a professional photographer and her mother an artist and early advocate of women's rights. Jewel received her education at the Henry C. de Mille School for Girls at Pompton Township, New Jersey, the East Greenwich Academy in East Greenwich, Rhode Island and a year's studies at the American Academy of Dramatic Arts in New York City. She made her professional stage debut at Wilmington, North Carolina on May 14, 1900, in a summer stock production of Thomas Hardy's Tess of the d'Urbervilles.

Within two weeks of her debut the sixteen-year-old actress was offered the opportunity to replace the troupe's recently departed lead actress as Fanny Le Grande in their production of the Jules Massenet opera Sapho. Later that year she joined the Rowe-King Repertoire Company's tour of New England and the following year supported actress Katherine Rober in summer stock productions at Providence, Rhode Island, before touring with the Bennett and Moulton Opera Company for the 1901–02 season.

On May 5, 1902, Jewel began a consecutive sixty-six-week run with the Castle Square Stock Company in Boston, playing such roles as Marianne in The Two Orphans, Polly Fletcher in The Lost Paradise, Helen McFarland in The Greatest Thing in the World and Caroline Murat in More Than Queen. During her time at the Boston Square Theatre Jewel also appeared in a number of Shakespearean productions such as The Merchant of Venice (Jessica), The Taming of the Shrew (Bianca), Hamlet (the Player Queen), and As You Like It (Celia). Her performance in the latter was particularly well received by Boston critics.

Over the following couple of seasons, Jewel toured in W. J. Thorold's Near the Throne, co-starred with Richard Buhlar in a road production of Paul Revere and played opposite Charles Bradshaw in a vaudeville skit entitled Fix in a Fix. Not long afterwards she joined the Pawtucket Theatre Stock Company in Rhode Island as a lead actress before forming the Jewel-Archer Stock Company in Salem, Massachusetts with actor Edward Archer. The following season she returned to repertoire with the Bennett-Moulton organization.

For the 1905–06 season, Jewel joined the Proctor Stock Company in New York City, where she was well received portraying Hugette in If I Were King; Stella Darbisher in Captain Swift; Florence Sherwood in Northern Lights and Antoinette De Mauban in The Prisoner of Zenda.

On October 6, 1906, in the aftermath of the San Francisco earthquake, Jewel starred in the first production at the city's new Colonial Theatre, as Clementina Fitzhugh in The Man from Mexico. Upon her arrival in San Francisco in mid September, Jewel received the news that her father had been killed in a train-pedestrian accident shortly after she and her mother had left for California.

During her time at the Colonial Jewel's most memorable roles were probably Oscar Wilde's Salomé and Pierre Burton's Zaza. Over the following two seasons she performed with the Bishop Stock Company in Oakland and the Baker Stock Company in Portland, Oregon. At the latter becoming something of a local celebrity by anointing her the first Rose Queen of the new Portland Rose Festival.

While in Portland, Otis Skinner's business manager, Joseph J. Buckley, saw Jewel play Ida Pipp in C. D. Gibson's The Education of Mr. Pipp. As a result, on January 3, 1910, she made her Broadway debut at the Garrick Theatre as Margaret Druce to Skinner's Lafayette Towers in the hit play, Your Humble Servant.

The following season she played opposite Skinner in Charles Frohman's production of Sire at the Criterion Theatre and in 1912 with James K. Hackett in The Grain of Dust also staged at the Criterion. Jewel next was engaged for several seasons as lead actress at The Poli's Theatre on Pennsylvania Avenue in Washington D.C. In 1913 the theater's manager, Sylvester Poli, paid the Otis Lithograph Company of Ohio $3,250 for 1,000 prints of an eleven color lithograph of Jewel's image; reportedly the most expensive lithograph ever produced up to that time.

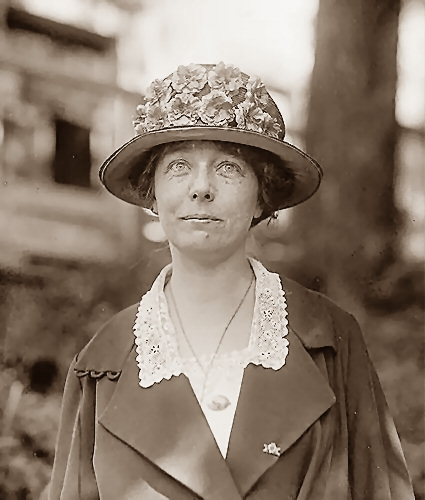
Izetta Jewel Brown, May 1922

== Marriages ==
Jewel left the stage after marrying Congressman William Gay Brown Jr. at the Belvedere Hotel in Baltimore, Maryland on December 4, 1914. Brown, a lawyer, banker, livestock rancher and farmer from Kingwood, West Virginia, was nearly thirty years her senior. His death in 1916, just a few weeks after the birth of their daughter Izetta Jewel Gay Brown, left her an estate worth several millions.

Jewel married Hugh Miller on April 16, 1927, at a friend's residence in Washington D. C. Miller had been a professor of engineering at George Washington University and by the time of their wedding was dean of the Engineering Department at Union College in Schenectady, New York. Her husband served in both World Wars with the U.S. Army attaining the rank of Lt. Colonel.

== Politics ==
On April 3, 1921, Jewel was among a delegation of fifty members of the National Woman's Party (NWP) that met with President Warren G. Harding urging his support to call a special session of congress to address discrimination against women. Three months later the NWP named Jewel as one their twenty-seven founding members in gratitude for her work and financial support. By 1922 Jewel was a leading figure behind the Women's Committee of the American Farm Bureau Federation that lobbied for reforms to help improve the lot of rural farmers and their families.

In 1922, Jewel became the first woman south of the Mason–Dixon line to run for the U.S. Senate. She narrowly lost the West Virginia Democratic Party nomination to Matthew Neely. At the 1924 Democratic National Convention Jewel's seconding speech (the first by a woman in both national parties) for presidential candidate John W. Davis captivated the usually distracted delegates for its eight-minute duration and was duly rewarded by a warm applause. In 1930 she was unable to unseat her incumbent Republican rival to represent New York's 30th congressional district and the following year she failed to win a seat in the New York Assembly. Jewel served as Commissioner of Public Welfare for Schenectady in 1932 and 1933. At one point she was jailed for ignoring a court order to reinstate a fired public employee. A a judge later voided the contempt of court charge because he felt as a woman she did not fully comprehend the consequences of ignoring the court.

In 1935 Jewel was appointed Regional Director of Women's Activities of the Works Progress Administration (WPA), overseeing women's relief projects in West Virginia, Pennsylvania, New Jersey, Kentucky and Ohio.

== Later life and achievements ==
After the death of her first husband Jewel became a noted breeder of purebred milk cows in West Virginia. In 1928 she appeared in the first teleplay (see WGY Radio, Schenectady, NY) ever broadcast in America, playing the Russian spy in J. Hartley Manners', The Queen's Messenger. She was a tireless advocate of the League of Nations and had met with the boy emperor Puyi during a trip to China and the Italian dictator Benito Mussolini while in Rome for a suffragette conference.

Jewel and her husband relocated to Southern California after the war years where she became a local radio personality on KCBQ in San Diego. In 1951 she was elected to the executive board of the newly formed American Women in Radio and Television organization. In 1958 she was invited to be a guest of honor at the Portland Rose Festival to commemorate the 50th anniversary of her coronation as Rose Queen.

Jewel remained active late into her life. She liked to take daily swims well into her eighties in the shores off her La Jolla home. The last few years of her life were spent at the Torrey Pines Convalescent Center in La Jolla where, on her 90th birthday, she was paid a visit by actors Helen Hayes and George C. Scott. Hayes performed with Jewel as a child actor and had long remained an admirer.

Jewel died in La Jolla in 1978, at the age of 94.
