= WEXT =

- Amsterdam, New York; United States
- Broadcast area: Capital District - Mohawk Valley
- Frequency: 97.7 MHz (HD Radio via WMHT-FM-HD2)
- Branding: Exit 97.7/106.1

Programming
- Format: Adult Album Alternative (AAA) (Public)
- Affiliations: National Public Radio; American Public Media; Public Radio Exchange

Ownership
- Owner: WMHT Educational Telecommunications
- Sister stations: WMHT (TV), WMHT-FM

History
- First air date: July 16, 1979 (as WMVQ)
- Former call signs: WCSS-FM (1975–1979); WMVQ (1979–1988); WKOL-FM (1988–1994); WBKK (1994–2007)
- Call sign meaning: "Exit"

Technical information
- Licensing authority: FCC
- Facility ID: 23457
- Class: A
- ERP: 1,600 watts
- HAAT: 190 meters (620 ft)
- Transmitter coordinates: 42°59′05″N 74°10′49″W
- Translators: 106.1 W291BY (Albany, NY)

Links
- Public license information: Public file; LMS
- Website: exit977.org

WEXT (97.7 MHz) is a listener-supported, public FM radio station broadcasting an adult album alternative format. Licensed to Amsterdam, New York, the station serves the Capital District and Mohawk Valley. The station is owned by WMHT Educational Telecommunications and features programming from American Public Media, National Public Radio and Public Radio Exchange. WEXT holds periodic fundraisers on the air to support the station.

WEXT has an effective radiated power (ERP) of 1,600 watts. The transmitter is off New York State Route 30 in Perth, New York. Programming is also heard on an FM translator in Albany, 106.1 W291BY and on the HD Radio digital subchannel of co-owned 89.1 WMHT-FM-HD2.

== History ==
In 1975, WCSS-FM first signed on, airing a top 40/oldies format. It was the FM counterpart to WCSS 1490 AM. In 1979, the call letters changed to WMVQ, carrying a Middle of the Road (MOR) format. In 1984, WMVQ changed formats to soft adult contemporary, which was known as Magic 97.7. In late 1988, the format was changed to oldies with the call letters WKOL-FM, which was known as Cool 97.7. In late 1989, the station flipped to adult contemporary. During the holidays in 1994, the station switched to all Christmas music. That would signal the end of the AC format.

On December 26, 1994, the station flipped to classical music as WBKK W-Bach. As a commercial station, the station originally ran using the KDFC DAT service, switching to the now-defunct SW Classical network and eventually to a service provided by WCRB in Boston, Massachusetts.

On August 4, 2005, the station became a simulcast of WMHT-FM after GEM Associates sold the station to WMHT Educational Telecommunications for $1.5 million. In April 2006, WBKK split off from the simulcast of WMHT-FM with a classical music format carrying shorter pieces than its sister station.

On July 7, 2007, WMHT-FM dropped their classical service on WBKK and launched a new adult album alternative format under the Exit 97.7 branding and the WEXT calls. The station highlights a lot of local music, calling it "Local 518" (in reference to the station's area code). Featured programs include the children's rock and roll program called The Peanut Butter Jam and the Latin music show The Latin Alternative.

On December 21, 2018, the program content of WEXT, which is also on WMHT-FM HD-2, was added to the translator at 106.1 with call sign W291BY.
