= Robert Chandler (network executive) =

American television executive

Robert Chandler (September 25, 1928 – December 11, 2008) was an American television executive who helped create and oversee the television newsmagazine 60 Minutes during his 22-year tenure at CBS News.

== Early life and education ==
He was born Robert Zuckerkandle in Brooklyn, New York on September 25, 1928, one of two sons of Louis and Minnie Gurin Zuckerkandle. Chandler was used by him as a pen name before he had his name legally changed. He attended the City College of New York, where he was the editor of the college newspaper and met his future wife, the former Eleanor Reiff. He graduated from CCNY in 1949 with a degree in economics.

== Career ==
Chandler was hired by Variety as a music reporter, where he worked for several years, interrupted by service in the United States Army in Germany from 1951 to 1953, after which he covered radio and television upon his return. Metro-Goldwyn-Mayer hired him in 1961 to serve as publicity director for its television division.

In 1963, Chandler was hired by CBS News as its director of information services. He later served as vice president in charge of public affairs broadcasts, where he was an advocate of implementing Don Hewitt's proposed 60 Minutes format, in which several standalone segments would be broadcast rather than the standard documentary format in which the same subject was covered for the entire hour. The first broadcast of 60 Minutes was on September 24, 1968. During the 1970s, Chandler approved the program's stories and finances, and helped bring Andy Rooney to the program. Don Hewitt credited Chandler for his role in the program, stating that "In my more than half a century at CBS News, I don't recall anyone having a better fix on what 60 Minutes should be than Bob Chandler". Chandler was named vice president for administration and assistant to the president of CBS News in 1975.

While with CBS News, he was responsible for production of The People of South Vietnam: How They Feel About the War, a March 1967 documentary that he wrote and co-produced; 1966 National Driver’s Test in May 1966, for which he was executive producer; and the December 1971 Emmy Award-nominated CBS Reports: Under Surveillance on U.S. government surveillance of dissenters, which he produced.

As director of operations for the CBS News Election Unit, Chandler was one of the creators of the CBS News Poll, which became the New York Times-CBS News Poll after a partner ship was established with the newspaper in 1976. Chandler retired from the CBS network in 1985. in his role with the News Election Unit, Chandler served as the CBS News member of the Board of Managers of the News Election Service, a joint organization of network and wire services that jointly monitored election results in the 1968 United States Presidential Election. He was co-executive producer of CBS News election night coverage in 1970 and 1972, and supervised the CBS News 1974 election night coverage in 1974.

He later worked for NBC News and was executive producer of the 1990 PBS documentary Learning in America: Schools That Work.

== Death ==
Chandler died at age 80 on December 11, 2008, of heart failure at his home in Pittsfield, Massachusetts.
