= WMHT (TV) =

Television station in Schenectady, New York

- Schenectady–Albany–Troy, New York; United States
- City: Schenectady, New York
- Channels: Digital: 25 (UHF); Virtual: 17
- Branding: WMHT

Programming
- Affiliations: 17.1: PBS; for others, see § Subchannels

Ownership
- Owner: WMHT Educational Telecommunications
- Sister stations: WMHT-FM, WEXT

History
- First air date: March 26, 1962
- Former channel numbers: Analog: 17 (UHF, 1962–2009); Digital: 34 (UHF, 2004–2019); Translators: W04AJ Schoharie; W04BD Glens Falls
- Former affiliations: NET (1962–1970)
- Call sign meaning: Mohawk–Hudson Television

Technical information
- Licensing authority: FCC
- Facility ID: 73263
- ERP: 445 kW
- HAAT: 426 m (1,398 ft)
- Transmitter coordinates: 42°37′31.3″N 74°0′36.7″W
- Translator(s): W23ER-D Poughkeepsie

Links
- Public license information: Public file; LMS
- Website: www.wmht.org

WMHT (channel 17) is a television station licensed to Schenectady, New York, United States, serving the Capital District as a member of PBS. It is owned by WMHT Educational Telecommunications alongside NPR member WMHT-FM (89.1) and adult album alternative station WEXT (97.7 FM). The three stations share studios in the Rensselaer Technology Park in North Greenbush (with a Troy mailing address); the TV station's transmitter is located in the Helderberg Escarpment in New Scotland.

WMHT operates digital translator W23ER-D (channel 23) in Poughkeepsie (part of the New York City market). The translator's ownership was transferred from Dutchess Community College to WMHT in 2014.

== History ==
The Mohawk-Hudson Council on Educational Television was formed in 1953, through financial support from commercial station WRGB (channel 6), its then-parent company General Electric (which was based in Schenectady) and many supporters and local businesses in the Albany/Capital Region. In the beginning, Mohawk-Hudson produced educational programs on WRGB; however, due to the station's tight scheduling, the council decided to form a non-commercial educational television station of its own. WMHT signed on the air on March 26, 1962, on UHF channel 17 as the second educational TV station in the state of New York (after WNED in Buffalo). From the outset the station was a member of National Educational Television (NET) and became one of PBS' charter members after the two stations merged in 1970. In 1972, WMHT expanded into FM radio by launching the first non-commercial classical music station in the United States (a format that continues to this day).

In 1987, WMHT purchased the assets of independent station WUSV (channel 45) and made it a secondary programming service under the calls WMHX. Due to financial difficulties, WMHT shut WMHX down in 1991 and returned it to the air three years later under the call letters WMHQ. In the late 1990s, WMHQ's commercial license became attractive and WMHT sold it to the Tribune Company for $18.5 million in 1999 with the station becoming WB affiliate WEWB that September (it is now CW affiliate WCWN, owned by the Sinclair Broadcast Group). The money from this sale allowed WMHT to expand into digital television. It also allowed the station to replace its original facility in Rotterdam with a state-of-the-art facility in the Rensselaer Tech Park in town of North Greenbush, New York.

== Programming ==
Programming produced by WMHT includes the state public affairs show New York NOW. The program is also aired on all public Television and radio stations across the state of New York in addition to being aired online and in a podcast format.

== Technical information ==
=== Subchannels ===
The station's signal is multiplexed:

Subchannels of WMHT
Subchannel	Res.	Short name	Programming
17.1	1080i	WMHT-HD	PBS
17.2	480i	WMHT-Cr	Create
17.3	480i	WMHT-Wo	World
17.4	480i	WMHT-Ki	PBS Kids

=== Analog-to-digital conversion ===
WMHT shut down its analog signal, over UHF channel 17 at noon on April 16, 2009. The station's digital signal remained on its pre-transition UHF channel 34, using virtual channel 17. During the 2019 digital television repack, WMHT relocated from UHF channel 34 to channel 25.

=== Translator ===
- W23ER-D Poughkeepsie

==== Former translators ====
- W04AJ Schoharie (analog; off-air upon 2009 digital transition, and no longer licensed to WMHT)
- W04BD Glens Falls (analog; off-air upon 2009 digital transition, and no longer licensed to WMHT)

== See also ==
- WMHT-FM
- WEXT
