= WKKF =

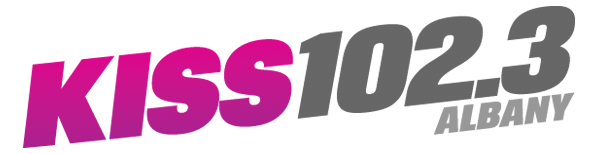
- Ballston Spa, New York; United States
- Broadcast area: Albany, New York
- Frequency: 102.3 MHz (HD Radio)
- Branding: Kiss 102-3

Programming
- Format: Contemporary hit radio
- Affiliations: Premiere Networks

Ownership
- Owner: iHeartMedia; (iHM Licenses, LLC)
- Sister stations: WGY, WGY-FM, WRVE, WPYX, WTRY-FM, WOFX

History
- First air date: 1968
- Former call signs: WKAJ-FM (1968–1979); WASM (1979–1987); WQQY (1987–1991); WZRQ (1991–1996); WXCR (1997–2000)
- Call sign meaning: Kapitol[sic] Kiss FM

Technical information
- Licensing authority: FCC
- Facility ID: 17030
- Class: A
- ERP: 4,100 watts
- HAAT: 118 meters (387 ft)
- Transmitter coordinates: 42.879°N 73.863°W

Links
- Public license information: Public file; LMS
- Webcast: Listen live (via iHeartRadio)
- Website: kiss1023.iheart.com

WKKF (102.3 FM) - branded Kiss 102-3 - is a contemporary hit radio station licensed to Ballston Spa, New York and serving the Capital District and Adirondacks. The station is owned by iHeartMedia and broadcasts at 4,100 watts ERP from a transmitter in Clifton Park, New York.

== Programming ==
WKKF airs a CHR format, including hip-hop, contemporary R&B, and EDM. Elvis Duran and the Morning Show, and American Top 40 hosted by Ryan Seacrest also air on the station.

== History ==
=== Saratoga Springs history ===
The 102.3 frequency originally began in Saratoga Springs, New York in 1968 as WKAJ-FM, sister to WKAJ running an easy listening format. The station also simulcasts New York Mets baseball games during its early years. In 1979, WKAJ-FM changed its calls to WASM keeping the easy listening format though by the mid-1980s the station evolved to an Adult contemporary approach. In June 1987, WASM flipped to Top 40 WQQY (102 Double Q) and began to make a minor wave in the Albany ratings by giving WFLY and WGFM a run for its money in Saratoga County. Among the air talent at WQQY was Rob Dawes early in his career before moving back to the frequency.

=== Move to Ballston Spa ===
With the decline of Top 40 in the early 1990s, its limited 3000 watt signal, WQQY began to look to the south for a better alternative. Having a construction permit to move the station down to the Albany area, WQQY moved its transmitter 12 miles south to Clifton Park (licensed to nearby Ballston Spa), upgraded to 6000 watts, and relaunched in September 1991 as WZRQ, becoming Albany's affiliate of ABC's Z-Rock satellite hard rock format. WZRQ remained as an affiliate of Z-Rock until the network's end in late 1996. Needing a new format, then-owner Radio Enterprises (a joint venture of Clear Channel Communications (now iHeartMedia) and local investors) decided to go after heritage rock station WPYX with a Classic Rock format as Classic Rock 102.3 FM with the WXCR calls. Though former WPYX morning team "Mason and Sheehan" were hired several months later, they were fired a year later, in 1998.

=== 102.3 KISS FM ===
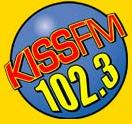
Kiss FM 102.3 logo

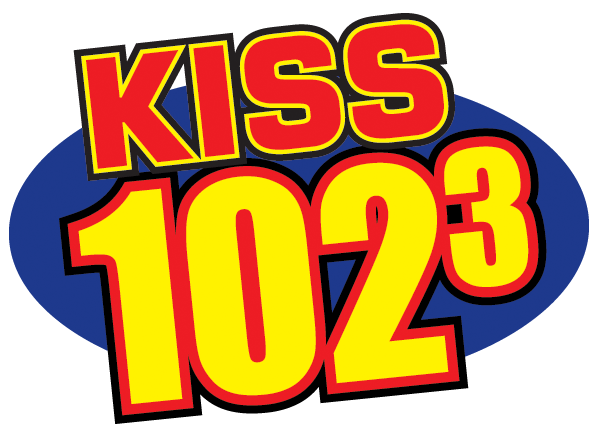
former logo

After Clear Channel acquired WPYX in 2000, 102.3 returned to Top 40 (CHR) as Clear Channel's trademarked KISS FM brand was adopted on May 26, 2000 after a day of stunting, with the WKKF calls following soon after. WXCR personality Steve Scott was the only one to make the transition from classic rock to CHR as Jeff Mrozek adopted the afternoon drive spot at former sister station WQBK-FM earlier that year. Since its launch, WKKF has been a largely successful station going after heritage CHR WFLY with a more rhythmic, younger-leaning format. This approach has allowed it to hold its own against WFLY, a station which had not seen competition for a decade prior to WKKF's launch, and WAJZ, a Rhythmic (since 2005) who happens to be WFLY's sister station.

Much of WKKF's early airstaff were transplants from other stations in the market: former Program Director/midday jock Rob Dawes previously held the same position at WFLY, former midday jock Ally Reid handled middays at WFLY as well as sister station WFLZ in Tampa, Florida, and former WFLY jock "Joey Kidd" (formerly in morning drive, also known as Joe Rosati on WDTW-FM in Detroit, Michigan). Mike Corts, former WFLY jock began board operating Mornings until Valentine in the Morning was syndicated. Corts was hired to host nights on Kiss and also hosted the popular and No. 1 rated Saturday night "Remix". Afternoon drive jock DJ Thomas, the last original staff member from WKKF's launch, former night jock Mick Lee now Program Director at WLIT, Chicago, as well as former evening jock Corey Kincaid, left WKKF in 2009. In addition, the syndicated Elvis Duran and the Morning Show (originating at WHTZ in New York City) was added in morning drive on the station that year.

After the demise of sister alternative rock station WHRL in September 2010, WKKF added more pop rock and alternative artists to its playlist that it would not play as much before, including The Script, Lady Antebellum, and Paramore; in addition, the station added more 1990s and early 2000s gold to its playlist. After the start of 2012, the station has reverted to a Rhythmic Contemporary direction, although still reporting as a Mainstream Top 40 by Mediabase and Nielsen BDS. Regarding WKKF's direction shift, they continue to be a mainstream top 40 because of most markets having two Top 40 (CHR) stations.

=== KISS 102.3 ===
By early 2013, the station has made a slight change in branding to Kiss 102.3 and reverted to a more mainstream CHR approach including more pop-rock artists.

== HD Radio operations ==
In 2005, WKKF upgraded to IBOC digital radio alongside the rest of Clear Channel's Albany stations. On August 17, 2006, WKKF began airing an HD2 channel with a pop and new music-heavy CHR format known as the Hot Spot (later rebranded as the Verizon New Music Channel) which is heard on several other Kiss stations across the United States. The HD2 channel flipped formats in 2011 to a 1980s and 1990s hip hop and R&B channel; a few years later, the format was dropped in favor of NickRadio, eventually On Air with Ryan Seacrest Replay Channel and then iHeart2010s.
