= WRVE =

Radio station in Schenectady, New York, United States

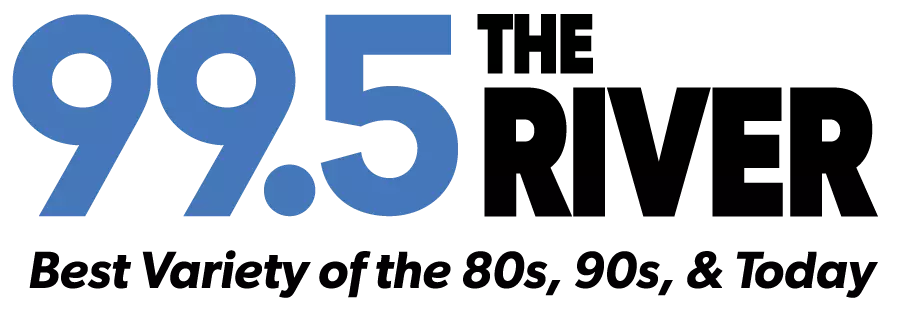
- Schenectady, New York; United States
- Broadcast area: Albany–Schenectady–Troy
- Frequency: 99.5 MHz (HD Radio)
- Branding: 99.5 The River

Programming
- Format: Hot adult contemporary
- Subchannels: HD2: Country "Wild Country 99.9"

Ownership
- Owner: iHeartMedia; (iHM Licenses, LLC)
- Sister stations: WGY, WGY-FM, WPYX, WTRY-FM, WKKF, WOFX

History
- First air date: February 1, 1939
- Former call signs: W2XOY (1939–1941); W57A (1941–1942); W87A (1942–1943); WGFM (1943–1988); WGY-FM (1988–1994)
- Call sign meaning: "River"

Technical information
- Licensing authority: FCC
- Facility ID: 15330
- Class: B
- ERP: 14,500 watts
- HAAT: 282 meters (925 ft)
- Transmitter coordinates: 42.637°N 73.995°W
- Translator: HD2: 99.9 W260CH (Albany)

Links
- Public license information: Public file; LMS
- Webcast: Listen Live; Listen Live (HD2)
- Website: 995theriver.iheart.com wildcountry999.iheart.com (HD2)

WRVE (99.5 FM) is a commercial radio station licensed in Schenectady and serving the Capital District and Upper Hudson Valley in New York. It broadcasts a hot adult contemporary radio format and calls itself "99.5 The River", referring to the Hudson River. The station is owned by iHeartMedia as one of seven radio stations owned by the company in the Albany-Schenectady-Troy radio market.

Studios and offices are at Riverhill Center on Troy-Schenectady Road (NY Route 7) in Latham, New York. The transmitter is on Pinnacle Road in Helderberg Escarpment tower farm in New Scotland.

WRVE is among the nation's oldest FM radio stations and was the first to broadcast full-time in stereo.

== Programming ==
Though classified by Arbitron and Mediabase as a Hot AC station, WRVE has a slight lean towards adult contemporary music. Its main competitor is WYJB (B95.5).

WRVE broadcasts using HD Radio technology, with its HD2 digital subchannel airing country music branded as "Wild Country 99.9". That format is also heard on 250 watt translator station W260CH 99.9 MHz in Albany.

== History ==
=== Experimental broadcasts ===
The station's original owner was General Electric (G.E.), which had a long history as a radio pioneer. In 1922 it founded one of the first AM broadcasting stations, WGY, which in 1925 became the first to operate with 50,000 watts. The company later started one of the first TV stations, WRGB-TV.

General Electric was the first major manufacturer to promote FM radio. WRVE traces its history to G.E.'s experimental FM station W2XOY, originally in New Scotland, New York, which began test transmissions on March 9, 1937. Additional experimental work was conducted by W2XDA in Schenectady. In 1938 these two stations were the first to demonstrate FM's "capture effect", a phenomenon where, when two stations with overlapping coverage operate on the same frequency, only the stronger signal is heard. The capture effect thus allowed co-channel FM broadcasting stations to be located somewhat closer to each other than AM ones, without causing mutual interference.

In August 1939 G.E's Schenectady operations were listed as one of only four FM facilities "in actual operation". On November 20, 1940 W2XOY began a regular service on 43.2 MHz, initially operating seven hours daily from 3 to 10 p.m. A month later, the frequency was changed to 45.7 MHz as the FCC closed the 43 MHz band.

=== Commercial operation ===
In May 1940 the FCC authorized an FM band effective January 1, 1941, operating on 40 channels spanning 42–50 MHz. G.E. filed an application in August 1940 and was issued a commercial station Construction Permit for 45.7 MHz that was assigned the call sign W57A. In the summer of 1942, the still uncompleted Construction Permit was modified to specify 48.5 MHz, which resulted in the call sign being adjusted to W85A. Effective November 1, 1943, the FCC modified its policy for FM call letters, and the station call sign was changed to the long-running WGFM. While operating as W2XOY, W85A and WGFM the station sometimes duplicated the programming of WGY, however, considerable effort was made to create programming unique to the FM channel.

On June 15, 1946, WGFM complied with the FCC's postwar FM band reallocation and switched on a transmitter at 100.7 MHz in the new band; for two years, it operated on both the old and the new bands simultaneously. In May 1947, the remaining new-band transmitter moved to 99.5 MHz, where it broadcasts to this day.

=== Stereo sound ===
On June 1, 1961, at 12:01 AM (EDT), WGFM became the first FM station in the United States to broadcast full-time in stereo. With the switch to higher quality stereo sound, the station no longer duplicated the programming of WGY. At first it aired a classical music format and later it changed to beautiful music.

=== Rock 99 ===
As FM radio listening grew during the 1970s, the 99.5 frequency played host to several formats. In 1973, it began airing TM's syndicated and automated Top 40 "Stereo Rock" format, calling itself "Rock 99". The same TM format and announcer was used at other FM stations in Upstate New York during this period, including WYUT (now WXUR) in Herkimer (Utica-Rome), WKFM (now WBBS) in Fulton–Syracuse, WNOZ (now WIII) in Cortland–Ithaca, WPXY in Rochester and WBEN-FM (now WBKV) in Buffalo. In 1981, WGFM switched to a live adult contemporary format, known as "99 - The Light".

In 1983, the station returned to Top 40 (this time with live personalities) as "99 GFM" and spent much of the 1980s in pursuit of competitor, 92.3 WFLY. By 1985, "99 GFM" had become the dominant Top 40 station in the Albany market; within two years, ratings began to erode. It was during this period that General Electric sold WGFM and WGY. The stations subsequently changed owners several times during the following decade.

=== Electric 99 ===
In 1987, WGFM brought in noted radio consultant Mike Joseph, who constructed an updated version of his successful Hot Hits Top 40 format. With the region's long association with General Electric, and many potential listeners employed by G.E., he dubbed the station "Electric 99". The longtime WGFM call letters were switched to WGY-FM. The station repeatedly played only the top 30 songs of the day along with a few cuts from the top selling albums, hosted by lively disc jockeys who promoted the music, ran contests and talked up local high schools and colleges.

With its ratings on the decline, WGY-FM changed its format to Oldies in October 1990. This occurred during a period when two other stations in the market were already airing Oldies music.

=== 99.5 The River ===
In late 1993, Dame Media purchased WGY and WGY-FM. Dame took control in March 1994, and immediately ended the oldies format. The call letters were changed to the current WRVE and the station began calling itself "99.5 The River". At the outset, the station was branded as "Rock without the Hard Edge" and was musically programmed as an adult album alternative station, though the station's music evolved to become more mainstream. At launch The River was focused on music and offered no contests or promotions, similar to Orlando's WMMO where DJ's would not talk over songs. When Clear Channel Communications (the forerunner to iHeartMedia) bought Dame Media in 1999, the station's format again moved to a more mainstream direction. In the middle of 2012, the station started adding in more current hits. The slogan became "The ’80s to Now, and Everything in Between". At the beginning of May 2013, WRVE removed some of its current hits and began playing more music from the mid 1990s and early 2000s. In order to keep diversity between its co-owned sister stations, WPYX (classic rock) and WKKF (Top 40), WRVE re-branded itself again, this time as "The ’90s to Now".

former logo

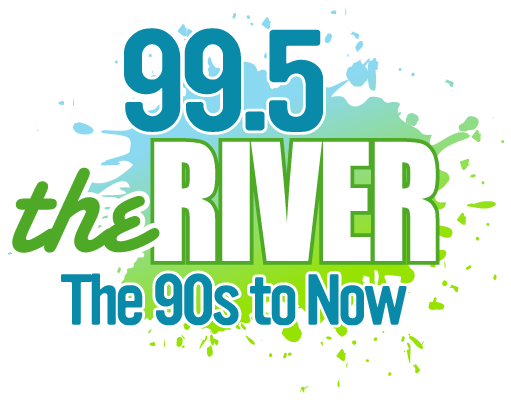
former logo

== WRVE HD-2 ==
In 2005, WRVE added IBOC digital radio (as did Clear Channel's other Albany stations). On August 17, 2006, WRVE began airing an HD2 channel with an adult album alternative similar to, but more varied than, the original "River" format. This HD2 channel was later replaced with a smooth jazz channel which was formerly located on WTRY-FM. On January 14, 2015, WRVE-HD2 changed its format to country music, which is also heard on FM translator W260CH 99.9 FM in Albany.

Broadcast translator for WRVE-HD2
| Call sign | Frequency | City of license | FID | ERP (W) | Class | Transmitter coordinates | FCC info |
|---|---|---|---|---|---|---|---|
| W260CH | 99.9 FM | Albany, New York | 140731 | 250 | D | 42°39′50.5″N 73°40′40.2″W | LMS |
