= WPYX =

Radio station in Albany, New York

- Albany, New York; United States
- Broadcast area: Capital District
- Frequency: 106.5 MHz (HD Radio)
- Branding: PYX 106

Programming
- Format: Classic rock
- Affiliations: United Stations Radio Networks; New York Giants Radio Network

Ownership
- Owner: iHeartMedia, Inc.; (iHM Licenses, LLC)
- Sister stations: WGY; WGY-FM; WKKF; WOFX; WRVE; WTRY-FM

History
- First air date: September 1967
- Former call signs: WDKC (1967–1971); WTRY-FM (1971–1973); WHSH (1973–1980)
- Call sign meaning: Pronounced "picks"

Technical information
- Licensing authority: FCC
- Facility ID: 73911
- Class: B
- ERP: 15,500 watts
- HAAT: 275 meters (902 ft)
- Transmitter coordinates: 42.636°N 74.001°W

Links
- Public license information: Public file; LMS
- Webcast: Listen live (via iHeartRadio)
- Website: pyx106.iheart.com

WPYX (106.5 FM "PYX 106") is a commercial radio station licensed to Albany, New York, and serving the Capital District. It broadcasts a classic rock radio format and is owned by iHeartMedia, Inc. WPYX also carries New York Giants football games.

WPYX has an effective radiated power (ERP) of 15,500 watts. The transmitter is on Pinnacle Road in Helderberg Escarpment tower farm in New Scotland, amid the towers for other Albany-area TV and FM stations. WPYX broadcasts using HD Radio technology. Its HD-2 digital subchannel formerly played 1970s classic rock, branded as "Gran Turino Radio".

== History ==
=== Middle of the road and top 40 ===
In September 1967, the station signed on as WDKC. It played middle of the road (MOR) music and was owned by Kopps-Monahan Communications, Inc., which also owned Top 40 powerhouse WTRY (980 AM; today's WOFX). In 1971, the call sign was changed to WTRY-FM to match its AM counterpart. It continued as an MOR station during the day, but would simulcast WTRY's Top 40 format at night. In 1972, it returned to a full time MOR sound.

In early 1973, the WTRY-AM-FM were sold, and WTRY-FM became WHSH, which then went to its first full-time rock format as the format was changed to a Top 40–oldies hybrid with live DJs. The station was now known as "Wish" as well as "The Albany Stereo Giant" and "Your Albany Wish". Ownership automated the station a year later in 1974, and changed the format to Oldies.

=== Beautiful music and album rock ===
During Labor Day weekend, 1975, the format was flipped again, this time to beautiful music, while keeping the "Wish" nickname. From 1975 to 1980, the station played quarter hour sweeps of mostly instrumental cover versions of popular songs, along with some Broadway and Hollywood show tunes.

By 1980 there was an obvious hole for a mainstream album-oriented rock (AOR) station in the Albany market. WHSH flipped to its current format on September 15, 1980, changing the call sign to WPYX and calling itself "PYX 106". WPYX used all live and local disc jockeys until April 28, 2009, when management replaced most of the local DJs with announcers from other cities who voice-track their shows, to make them sound as if they are in the Capital District.

=== Ownership changes ===
WPYX and WTRY went through several changes in ownership over the years. These included Scott Broadcasting of Pennsylvania, television personality Merv Griffin and Capstar Broadcasting (which was controlled by billionaire mogul Tom Hicks). In 1999, Capstar merged with another Hicks-owned company, Chancellor Media Corporation, to form AMFM Inc.

In 2000, the stations were acquired by Clear Channel Communications when that company merged with AMFM. Clear Channel became iHeartMedia in 2014. WPYX has kept its same call letters and rock format since September 15, 1980.

== HD Radio operations ==
In 2005, WPYX upgraded to IBOC digital radio alongside the rest of Clear Channel's Albany stations. On August 17, 2006, WPYX began airing an HD2 channel with a deep tracks classic rock format, known as Vinyl Vineyard which was later replaced with a classic country format in August 2012.

The classic country was eventually dropped. In September 2018, WPYX-HD2 began playing a Christmas music format called, "iHeartChristmas Lites". That format later gave way to "Gran Torino Radio", a format of 1970s classic rock. The HD2 subchannel has since been turned off.
