= WGY (AM) =

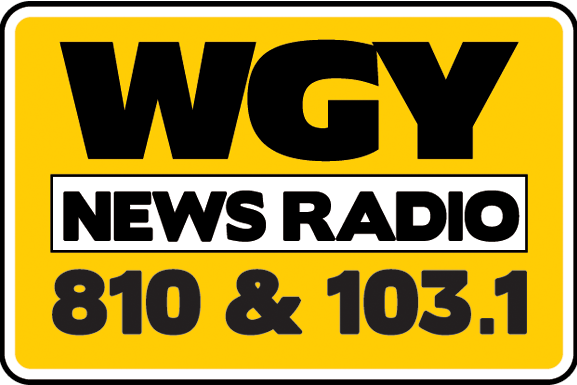
- Schenectady, New York; United States
- Broadcast area: Capital District
- Frequency: 810 kHz
- Branding: News Radio 103.1 and 810 WGY

Programming
- Format: Talk radio
- Affiliations: Compass Media Networks; Fox News Radio; Premiere Networks; Westwood One; Syracuse Sports Network

Ownership
- Owner: iHeartMedia, Inc.; (iHM Licenses, LLC)
- Sister stations: WKKF, WGY-FM, WOFX, WPYX, WRVE, WTRY-FM

History
- First air date: February 20, 1922
- Former frequencies: 833 and 619 kHz (1922); 750 and 619 kHz (1922–1923); 790 kHz (1923–1941)

Technical information
- Licensing authority: FCC
- Facility ID: 15329
- Class: A (clear channel)
- Power: 50,000 watts
- Transmitter coordinates: 42°47′32″N 74°0′43″W
- Repeater: 103.1 WGY-FM (Albany)

Links
- Public license information: Public file; LMS
- Webcast: Listen live (via iHeartRadio)
- Website: wgy.iheart.com

WGY (810 AM) is a commercial radio station licensed to Schenectady, New York, and serving the Capital District of New York. It simulcasts a talk format with WGY-FM (103.1 FM). Owned by iHeartMedia, its studios are located on Troy-Schenectady Road in Latham. WGY is one of the first stations in the United States, and the oldest to operate continuously in New York State, having launched on February 20, 1922.

WGY is powered at 50,000 watts clear-channel, the maximum for commercial AM stations in the U.S. Its transmitter is off Mariaville Road, near the New York State Thruway in the Town of Rotterdam. In addition to a standard analog transmission, WGY is also available online via iHeartRadio.

== History ==
=== Experimental years ===
WGY's original licensee was General Electric (GE), a company headquartered in Schenectady that had extensive experience in radio research and development. In 1903, Reginald Fessenden contracted with GE to help him design and produce a series of high-frequency alternator-transmitters. This project was ultimately assigned to Ernst F. W. Alexanderson, who in August 1906 delivered a unit which was successfully used by Fessenden to make radiotelephone demonstrations.

In early 1915, GE was granted a Class 3-Experimental license with the call sign 2XI. That license was canceled in 1917 due to the United States' entry into World War I. 2XI was relicensed in 1920.

Ernst Alexanderson continued alternator design research and developed more powerful transmitters that by 1919 were considered the best available option for long distance radiotelegraph communication. In 1919, GE's leadership in alternator manufacture led the U.S. government to promote the idea of the company taking over the assets of the Marconi Wireless Telegraph Company of America. This purchase was used to form a GE subsidiary, the Radio Corporation of America (RCA), which became the leading radio company in the United States. In 1921, GE signed a cross-licensing agreement with the Westinghouse Electric and Manufacturing Company that made RCA the sales agent for radio equipment produced by the two companies. (In 1932 RCA became an independent company as part of an antitrust settlement).

Alternator radio transmitters became obsolete by the mid-1920s due to advances in vacuum-tube technology, and another GE employee, Irving Langmuir, played an important role in this development. GE was a major manufacturer of radio vacuum tubes during World War I, and produced over 200,000 for the military during the conflict. Tubes of increasing power ratings were designed, and by the summer of 1922, Langmuir had introduced a 20-kilowatt version.

Radio communication was initially generally limited to Morse code transmissions. By the early 1920s, improvements in vacuum-tube capabilities made audio transmissions practical. Effective December 1, 1921, the United States Department of Commerce, which beginning in 1912 had been responsible for regulating radio stations, set aside two wavelengths for use by broadcasting stations: 360 meters (833 kHz) for "entertainment", and 485 meters (619 kHz) for "market and weather reports".

On February 4, 1922, GE received its first broadcasting license, for a new station located in Schenectady which was authorized to transmit on the 360-meter entertainment wavelength and was issued the randomly assigned call letters WGY. (A few months later permission was granted to also broadcast on 485 meters.) The original transmitter produced an antenna power of 1,500 watts, which was three times the wattage of the standard "high-powered" station at the time. Unusual for the period, the station's studio and transmitter site were at separate locations. Broadcasts originated from a studio on the fourth floor of Building 36 at the General Electric Plant in Schenectady, which was connected to a T-top wire antenna located atop Building 40, another GE building about 1/3 of a mile (1/2 km) distant.

=== Early broadcasts ===
The station was placed under the oversight of Martin P. Rice, who was the manager of the company's publication bureau. WGY's debut broadcast started at 7:47 p.m. on February 20, 1922, when Kolin Hager, or as he was known on the air, "KH", signed on with the station's call letters, explaining the W is for wireless, G for General Electric, and Y, the last letter in Schenectady. The first broadcast, "furnished by some of this city's best talent" lasted about one hour. It consisted of live music and announcements of song titles and other information. The station's second program took place two days later, and featured a speech about George Washington, delivered by W. W. Tranch, Schenectady's American Legion post commander, followed by a concert.

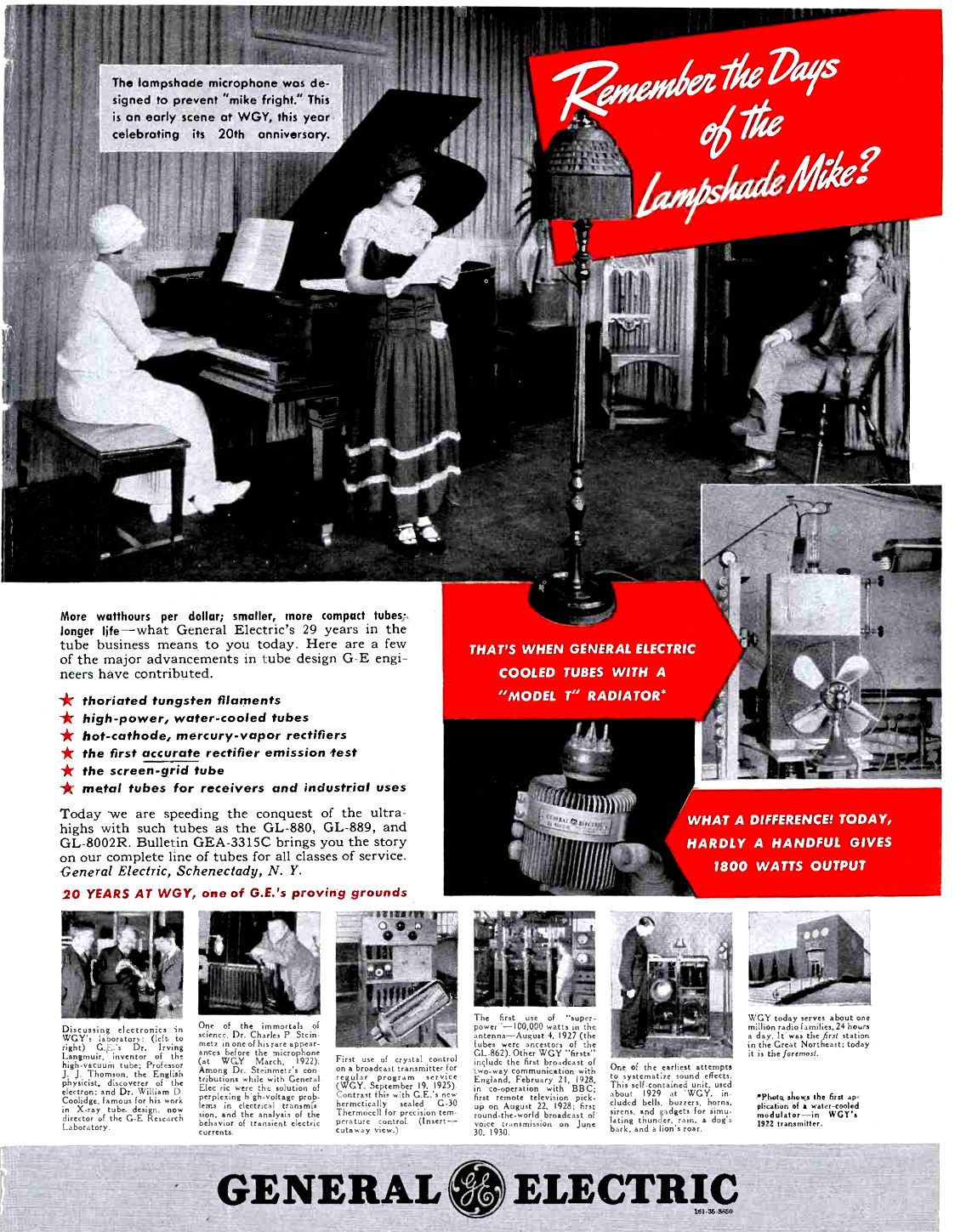
1942 advertisement for General Electric and WGY.

WGY was a pioneer in the use of remote broadcasts originating from locations outside of the main studio, carrying out the first one just days after it signed on. On February 23, 1922, the station ran a telephone line connection to the Union College gymnasium, where New York governor Nathan L. Miller and others gave speeches commemorating the 17th anniversary of the Rotary Club. This was followed by a short concert. Other early programming included coverage of the Yale-Harvard football game live from New Haven, Connecticut; the WGY String Orchestra live from the State Theater in Schenectady, and talks and presentations by various GE innovators, explorers, state and local officials.

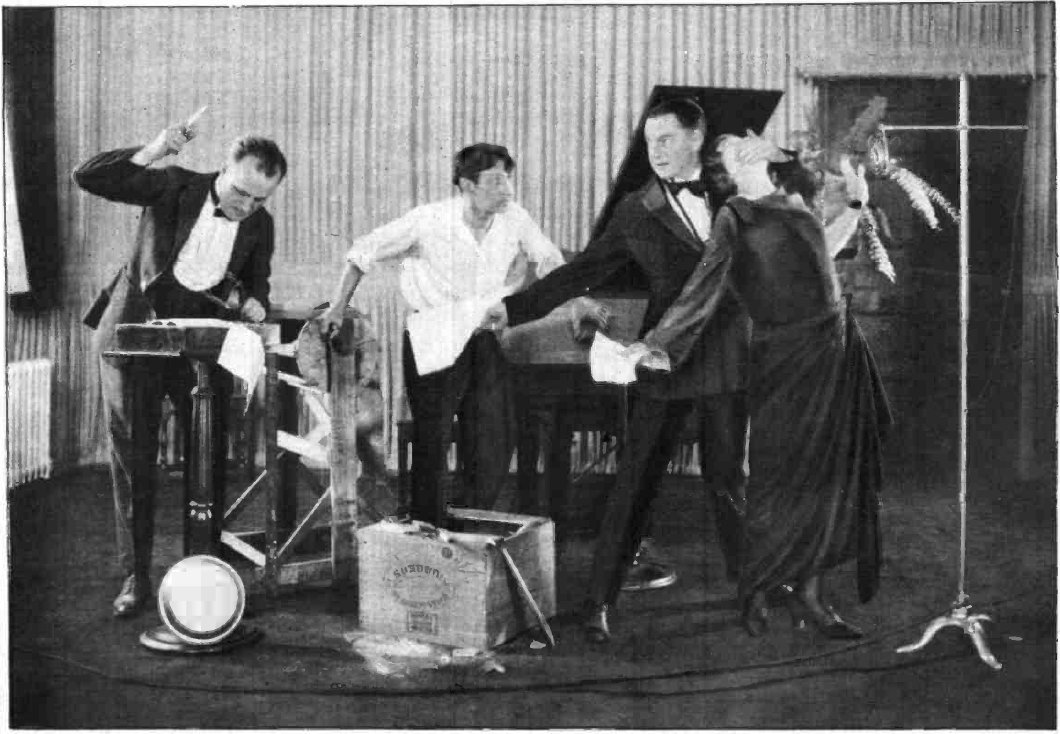
WGY Radio Players performing a dramatic scene from William Vaughn Moody's The Great Divide (1923)

A few months after WGY began broadcasting, Edward H. Smith, director of a community theater group called the Masque in nearby Troy, suggested to Kolin Hager that WGY carry weekly 40-minute long adaptations of plays. A troupe was formed known as the WGY Players performing as radio's first dramatic series. On August 3, 1922, they presented Eugene Walter's 1908 play The Wolf, the first of 43 dramatizations performed during the 1922–1923 season. Smith became a pioneer of radio drama sound effects during this first play when he slapped a couple of two-by-four boards together to simulate the slamming of a door. Initially the actors wore costumes and makeup on the theory that this would enhance performances, but the practice was soon discarded as unneeded. The WGY Orchestra was used to provide music between acts. Response was immediate, with the station reporting that the broadcast resulted in its receiving more than two thousand letters. On November 9, the Players presented on The Sign of the Four starring Edward H. Smith as Sherlock Holmes, and the world's only consulting detective joined the growing number of "disembodied voices floating through electromagnetic heaven."

In 1923, Guglielmo Marconi, credited as the inventor of radio, paid a visit to Schenectady to see WGY's transmitter and studios.

=== TV experiments ===
Beginning in 1926, Ernst Alexanderson worked on an experimental mechanical television system. This led, on September 11, 1928, to the WGY Players broadcasting the first televised play, an old spy melodrama titled The Queen's Messenger and starring Izetta Jewel and Maurice Randall. Alexanderson's development of a portable and simplified television transmitter made the broadcast possible. The only viewers were newspaper and magazine writers watching the program on a 3x3-inch (7.6 cm) screen located three miles (five kilometers) away in the WGY studio. The broadcasts took place at 1:30 and 11:30 pm.

In September 1922, the Department Of Commerce set aside a second entertainment wavelength, 400 meters (750 kHz) for "Class B" stations that had quality equipment and programming. Locally, both WGY and the Rensselaer Polytechnic Institute station, WHAZ, were assigned to this new wavelength on a time-sharing basis. In May 1923, additional broadcasting frequencies were announced, and the Schenectady/Troy region was given exclusive national use of 790 kHz. WGY and WHAZ were assigned to share this new allocation. On November 1, 1927, WHAZ moved to a new frequency, giving WGY full-time use.

WGY also used the first condenser microphone, developed by General Electric for radio studio applications, on February 7, 1923.

=== Network radio ===
On January 4, 1923, the American Telephone and Telegraph Company (AT&T) made the first network radio broadcast, using special telephone lines to relay a program from its New York City station, WEAF, to a Boston station. On June 3, 1923, WGY participated in AT&T's second network test, which linked WEAF to WGY, KDKA in Pittsburgh, and KYW in Chicago. The Radio Corporation of America (RCA) responded by developing a network operation centered on its New York City station, WJZ, and in December 1923 made its first test network connection with a hookup to WGY. The WJZ network never advanced beyond a few affiliates, and struggled with the low fidelity of relying on Western Union telegraph lines to link stations. In 1926, RCA bought out AT&T's network operations, and WGY affiliated with the newly established WEAF-based NBC Red Network. In the Albany market, WABY affiliated with the NBC Blue Network, which later became ABC Radio, while WOKO became a CBS affiliate. WGY remained with NBC Radio until it folded in 1989.

In 1925, WGY helped organize the New York State Radio Network, formed with WMAK in Buffalo, WHAM in Rochester, WFBL in Syracuse and WGY.

In 1924, the transmitter site was moved to its current location in the Town of Rotterdam, then known as South Schenectady. This site was also home of GE's experimental shortwave radio stations W2XAF (31.48 meters or 9.525 MHz) and W2XAD (19 meters or 15 MHz). WGY's power levels were steadily increased, first to 5,000 watts, then 10,000 watts and finally to 50,000 watts on July 18, 1925. By 1928, the WGY transmitter was capable of operating at 150,000 watts, and an application was made to increase to this power. However, this was three times the limit allowed by the Federal Radio Commission (FRC), and the application was denied. Temporary broadcasts were carried out at the 100 kW (August 4, 1927) and 200 kW (March 9, 1930) power levels. From those broadcasts, the station received reception letters and telegrams from as far away as New Zealand. Plans were to make those power increases permanent, but were never carried out.

=== Clear channel status ===
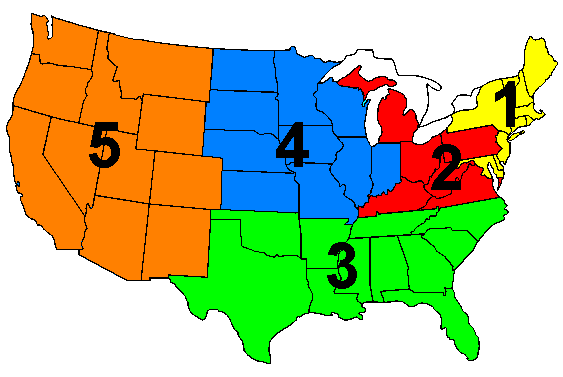
Regional districts used for the November 11, 1928, implementation of the Federal Radio Commission's General Order 40. KGO was in Region 5, and WGY was in Region 1

The March 28, 1928, reauthorization of the Radio Act of 1927 included a provision, known as the Davis Amendment, which mandated an "equality of radio broadcasting service" within the United States. This specified an "equitable allocation" among five regional zones. Effective November 11, 1928, the Federal Radio Commission implemented a major reassignment of transmitting frequencies, as outlined by its General Order 40 Band Plan. This plan designated 40 U.S. clear channels, divided eight to each region, with KGO in Oakland, California, on 790 kHz, included as one of the Region 5 assignments. The only other station assigned to 790 kHz was WGY. KGO and WGY were both owned by GE, with WGY considered the company's showcase station. GE was able to effectively transfer KGO's clear channel assignment from Region 5 to WGY's Region 1, by increasing the power of WGY to 50,000 watts, while limiting KGO to 7,500 watts. (Directional antennas were not developed until the early 1930s, so both stations operated with non-directional antennas.) Any question about the propriety of this action became moot after the Davis Amendment was repealed on June 5, 1936.

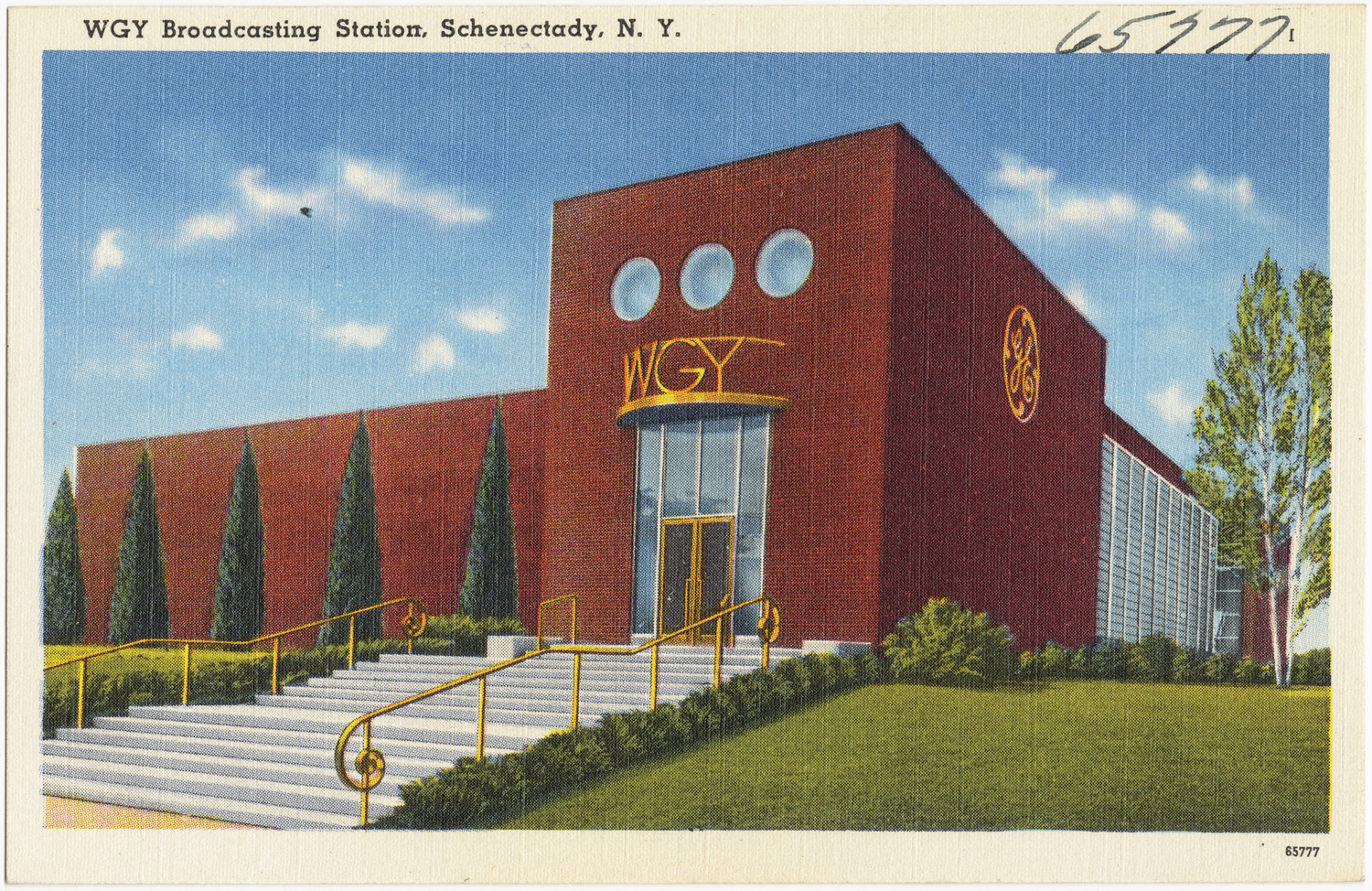
The studio building as it appeared circa 1938–1945.

By 1935, the engineering staff of WGY began work to replace the T-top antenna system with a single vertical radiator tower. At the time, the station was plagued with signal fading at a distance of 30–100 miles (50–160 km) from the transmitter site due to cancellation by out-of-phase co-channel signals from the same source. The ideas for this tower were formed from experiments at WJZ in New York. From this, a square, half-wavelength (on 790 kHz) 625 foot (190-meter) tower was constructed in 1938. The half-wavelength design greatly reduced high angle radiation, thus solved the close in fading issues, and this antenna is still in use today.

In 1938, the station's studios were moved from Building 36 into a brand new building on River Road, in Downtown Schenectady. These studios were torn down in 1961 to make way for Interstate 890. At that time, the studios were moved to 1400 Balltown Road in Niskayuna, New York, co-located with GE owned-and-operated WRGB-TV Channel 6.

=== Move to 810 ===
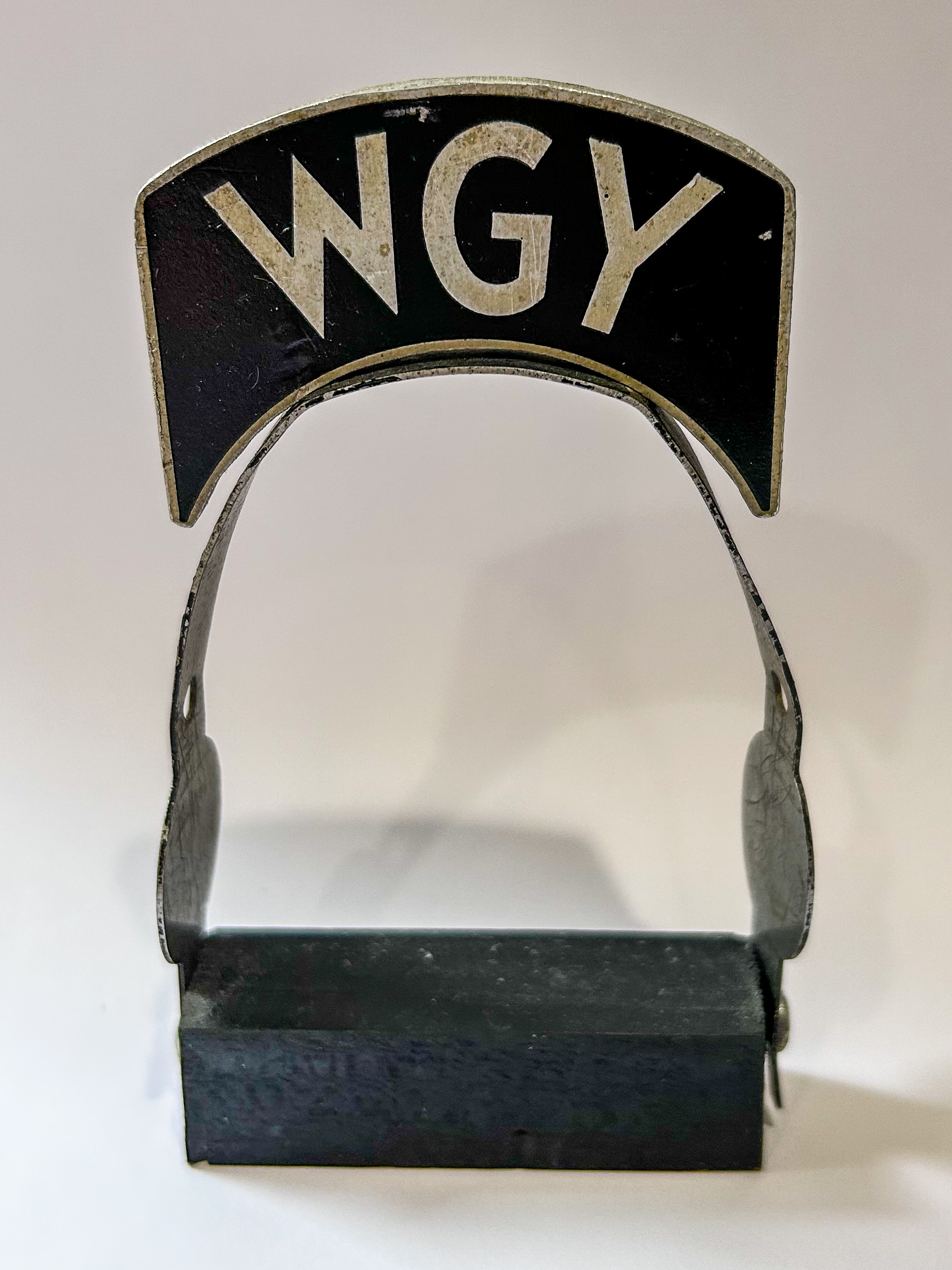
A metal microphone flag used in the WGY studios during the early-to-mid 1940s

In 1941, the stations on 790 kHz, including WGY and KGO, were moved to 810 kHz, with the implementation of the North American Regional Broadcasting Agreement (NARBA). In 1942, during World War II, a concrete wall was built around the base of the transmitter tower to prevent saboteurs from shooting out the base insulator on the tower and taking the station off the air.

As the "Golden Age of Radio" ended, WGY evolved into a full service, middle of the road format of popular music, news and talk. It was the flagship station of General Electric's broadcasting group until 1983, when it was sold to Sky Communications and soon after to Empire Radio Partners, Inc. General Electric's Schenectady operations also pioneered television by putting WRGB-TV on the air, which signed on as W2XB in 1928; and FM radio station W2XOY, later WGFM, then WGY-FM, and today WRVE, which signed on in 1940 and is credited as the first FM station to broadcast in stereo around the clock. Dame Media, Inc. acquired WGY-AM-FM during proceedings in a Philadelphia bankruptcy court, late 1993.

=== All talk and news ===
The AM station eliminated its remaining music programming and became an all-news/talk station on Memorial Day Weekend, 1994. Dame moved the studios to One Washington Square at the end of Washington Avenue Extension, in the west end of Albany, in late 1994, where they remained until 2005. In 1999, Dame Media sold its entire radio group to Clear Channel Communications based in San Antonio. Clear Channel combined all of its Albany-area radio station facilities into the former CHP (Community Health Plan) building on Route 7 (Troy-Schenectady Road) in Latham, in August 2005.

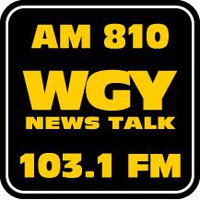
Former station logo

After being one of the founding members of the NBC Radio Network, WGY announced in June 1989 that it would end its 63-year association with the network and change to CBS Radio News, replacing WQBK AM–FM, that September. WGY news director Peter Rief said that the quality of NBC's radio product had declined following the sale of the radio network to Westwood One. The station then switched to ABC News Radio in July 1994, which allowed WGY to add Paul Harvey to its lineup. In August 2005, Clear Channel Communications switched the majority of its news/talk radio stations, including WGY, to Fox News Radio as a boost to that network's launch. Paul Harvey remained on WGY for an additional year. In 2009, WGY received a Radio Television Digital News Association (RTDNA) Edward R. Murrow Award for its coverage of the 2009 Capital Region ice storm.

On September 20, 2010, WGY began simulcasting its programming on WHRL, renamed to WGY-FM.

On February 6, 2012, WGY began an affiliation with AccuWeather for its weather coverage. It discontinued its ties with The Weather Channel after more than a decade. In 2014, Clear Channel Communications changed its corporate name to iHeartMedia.

Several notable former WGY personalities include Mike Gallagher, who hosted afternoon drive in the mid-1990s before moving to WABC in New York, and is now part of the Salem Radio Network. Other notable hosts include Mark Williams, J. R. Gach and Andrew Wilkow of Sirius Satellite Radio who was heard in afternoon drive and later in late mornings. Another WGY weekday local show was hosted by Al Roney, who was replaced by Glenn Beck on February 25, 2010. Don Weeks retired in 2010 after spending 30 years as WGY's morning host. He died in 2015 at age 76.

== Programming ==
Local hosts on WGY include Bob Lonsberry and Dave Allen; the remainder of the lineup is devoted to nationally syndicated conservative talk shows.

== See also ==
- 1928 in television
- List of initial AM-band station grants in the United States
- List of three-letter broadcast call signs in the United States
