= WTRY-FM =

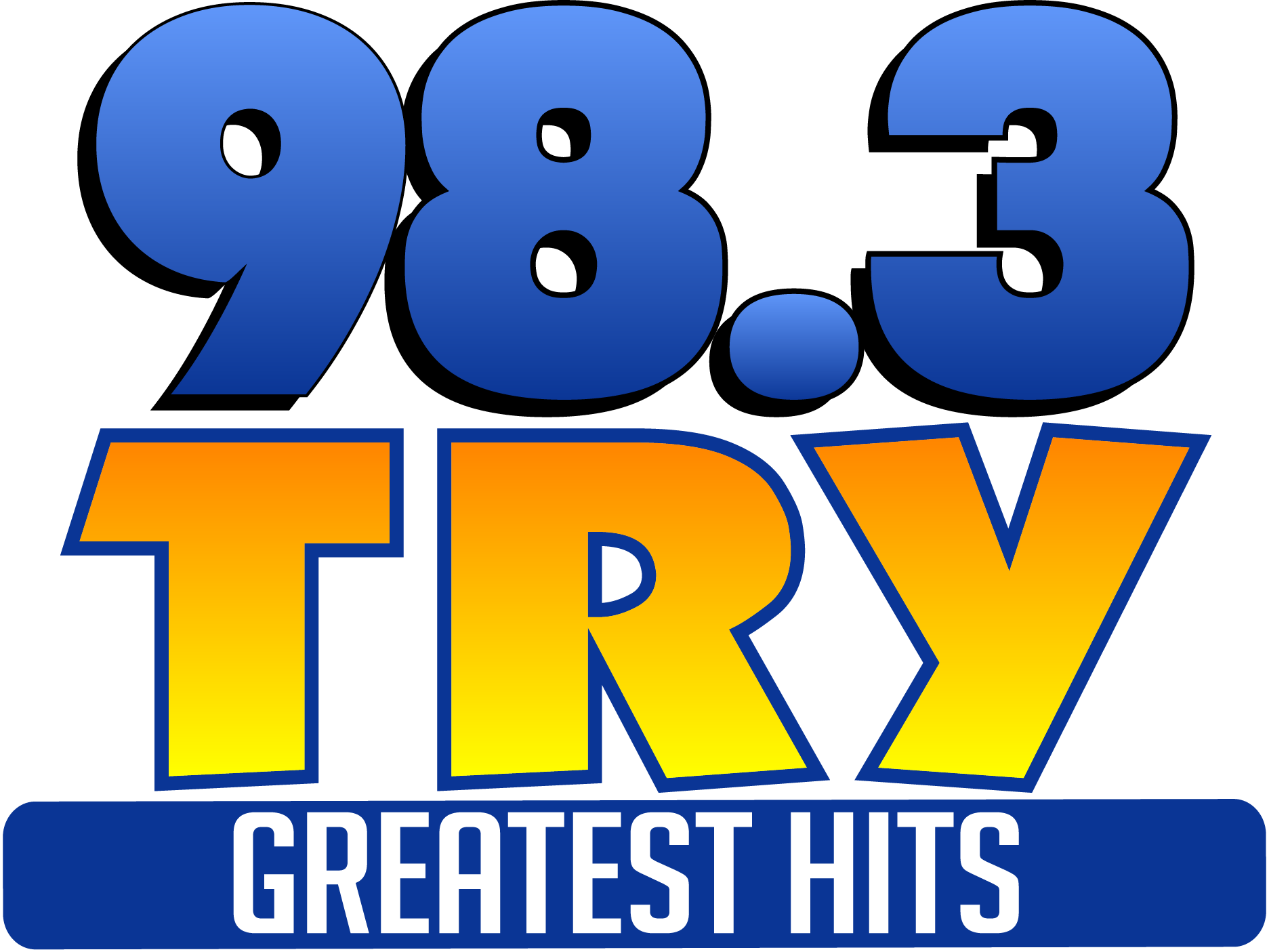
- Rotterdam, New York; United States
- Broadcast area: Capital District (Albany-Schenectady-Troy)
- Frequency: 98.3 MHz (HD Radio)
- Branding: 98-3 TRY

Programming
- Format: Classic hits
- Affiliations: Premiere Networks

Ownership
- Owner: iHeartMedia; (iHM Licenses, LLC)
- Sister stations: WGY; WGY-FM; WRVE; WPYX; WKKF; WOFX

History
- First air date: December 18, 1986 (as WNYQ)
- Former call signs: WDNZ (1986, not on-air); WERV (1986, not on-air); WNYQ (1986–1987); WNYJ (1987–1989); WSHZ (1989–1992); WTRY-FM (1992–1994); WYSR (1994–1996)
- Call sign meaning: Troy (former call sign of 980 AM, now WOFX, which is licensed to Troy)

Technical information
- Licensing authority: FCC
- Facility ID: 8563
- Class: A
- ERP: 6,000 watts
- HAAT: 97 meters (318 ft)
- Transmitter coordinates: 42.745°N 74.069°W

Links
- Public license information: Public file; LMS
- Webcast: Listen live (via iHeartRadio)
- Website: 983try.iheart.com

WTRY-FM (98.3 MHz, "98-3 TRY"), is a commercial radio station licensed to Rotterdam, New York. It airs a classic hits format (and Christmas music from early-November until December 30 or 31). WTRY-FM serves the New York State Capital District in the Albany-Schenectady-Troy radio market. The station is owned by iHeartMedia, and broadcasts at 6,000 watts ERP from a tower in between Altamont and Duanesburg off U.S. Route 20. Studios and offices are on Troy-Schenectady Road (Route 7) in Latham.

The classic hits format on WTRY-FM is a direct continuation of the oldies format which was previously heard on AM 980. The original WTRY was a highly popular Top 40 station in the Albany market through the 1960s and 1970s, moving over to oldies in the 1980s and 1990s, and today is sports radio 980 WOFX.

WTRY-FM broadcasts in the HD Radio format.

== History ==
=== Pre-launch and early formats ===
The first decade of 98.3 was quite unstable. A testament to this can be seen even before it went on the air. In its construction permit stage, 98.3 was to become WDNZ with an early dance/rhythmic contemporary format. However, permit owner Dennis Jackson (now a noted community broadcaster in smaller towns throughout the Northeast) was forced to sell the station before it hit the air.

Under new owners, another set of call letters (WERV) came and went before the frequency signed on as adult contemporary WNYQ on December 15, 1986. The call sign was changed to WNYJ in 1987. Being a new frequency, completely satellite-fed, and going up against a popular AC station WKLI-FM, the format on 98.3 was changed in late 1988 to oldies as Cruisin' 98.3, still keeping the WNYJ call sign.

=== 98.3/103.5 SHO-FM ===
In mid 1989, WNYJ was sold and returned to adult contemporary music as WSHZ SHO-FM, adding a simulcast on WACS-FM 103.5 in Cobleskill (which became WSHQ). WSHZ/WSHQ's adult contemporary format was not successful, and in late September 1990, the format was flipped back to oldies, still as SHO-FM (though it was known as Super Hit Oldies SHO-FM in 1990). A few days later, WGY-FM flipped to oldies as well, causing major problems for both WSHZ/WSHQ and WTRY (980 AM).

=== First WTRY simulcast/Star 98.3 ===
Looking for a boost, then-WTRY owner Liberty Broadcasting entered into a local marketing agreement with WSHZ in late 1991 and flipped 98.3 to a simulcast of 980, both stations playing oldies. This arrangement proved successful, outlasting WGY-FM (which switched to a hot adult contemporary format as WRVE in 1994). By the end of 1991 the simulcast ended with 98.3 moving to a 1970s music format, as WYSR Star 98.3. (After 98.3 dropped the Star branding in 1996, the name was reused by WQAR from 1998 to 2013 under a different format.)

=== Second WTRY simulcast and move to FM ===
In August 1996, WYSR became an outright sister to WTRY when SFX Broadcasting (which bought Liberty earlier that year) bought WYSR from Jarad Broadcasting. Three months later, the simulcast was restored but with a couple wrinkles: 980 would be simulcasting 98.3 rather than vice versa, and WTRY-FM broadcast its own morning show while WTRY AM aired the syndicated Imus in the Morning. After Clear Channel Communications (now iHeartMedia) purchased AMFM in 2000, the simulcast ended in September of that year, when 980 flipped to sports as WOFX.

=== Format evolution ===
Until 1999, WTRY's oldies format largely featured music from 1964 to 1969 with several pre-1964 oldies an hour and about one early 1970s hit an hour cutting off at about 1973. During the course of 1999, songs up to the late 1970s were mixed in and 1970s music was being played several times an hour cutting a couple 1964 to 1969 songs per hour. In 2001, a few 1980s hits were being mixed into the format being played about once per hour. Later that year pre-1964 oldies began to be cut back to two an hour and by 2002 one per hour. In 2003, the word oldies began to be used less and the station was now focusing on the 1964 to 1975 time period. In 2004, WTRY was now playing about half 1964-1969 songs and about half 1970s songs with a 1980s song mixed in and pre-1964 oldies almost completely gone. By 2005, the station had evolved into more of a classic hits format. Beginning in 2001, WTRY began playing all Christmas music around Thanksgiving until some time on December 26. As time went on this annual tradition began earlier in November.

On December 26, 2007, after its annual temporary Christmas format ended, WTRY surprised its listeners with a switch to classic hits, mainly playing songs from the 1970s and 1980s with some 1960s songs mixed in, under the My Music slogan. After playing Christmas music from November 1, 2010, the station reverted to oldies of the 1960s and 1970s as of December 27, 2010, in a similar style to sister stations KJR-FM (Seattle) and KLTH (Portland, Oregon). In early February 2011, WTRY continued to evolve towards a more traditional type of oldies format, while facing competition from 96.7 WPTR, which had just flipped to oldies from contemporary Christian. In November 2011, WPTR became Christian talk station WDCD-FM.

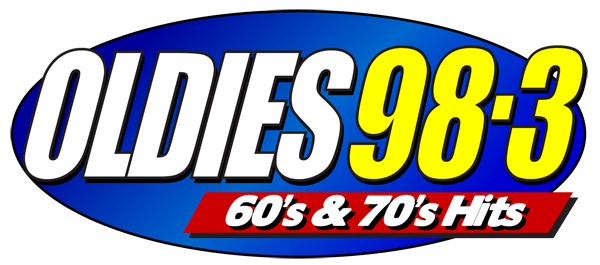
logo as Oldies 98.3, 2012-2015

On February 27, 2012, WTRY rebranded as "Oldies 98.3". On April 29, 2015, WTRY shifted the format to classic hits, branded as "98-3 TRY".

== HD radio operations ==
In 2005, WTRY-FM upgraded to IBOC digital radio along with the rest of Clear Channel's Albany stations. On August 17, 2006, WTRY-FM began airing an HD2 channel with a smooth jazz format. In 2007, it flipped to Cool Oldies with 1950s and 1960s hits, as the smooth jazz format moved to 99.5 WRVE-HD2. As of 2011, WTRY-FM's HD2 signal aired an all-1980s format. Around September 2018, WTRY-FM's HD2 airs a classic Christmas music format called, "iHeartChristmas Classics", which airs Christmas songs from the 1950s, 1960s, and early 1970s with some Michael Bublé thrown in every once in a while. The HD subchannel has since been turned off.
