= WOPG-FM =

- Esperance, New York; United States
- Broadcast area: Mohawk Valley; Capital District
- Frequency: 89.9 MHz

Programming
- Format: Catholic
- Affiliations: EWTN Radio

Ownership
- Owner: Pax et Bonum, Inc.
- Sister stations: WOPG

History
- First air date: November 3, 2010
- Call sign meaning: "Words Of Peace and Goodness"

Technical information
- Licensing authority: FCC
- Facility ID: 171661
- Class: B1
- ERP: 1,400 watts
- HAAT: 306 meters (1,004 ft)
- Transmitter coordinates: 42°46′28.9″N 74°40′53″W

Links
- Public license information: Public file; LMS
- Webcast: Listen live
- Website: pax-et-bonum-radio.org

WOPG-FM (89.9 MHz) is a Catholic radio station licensed to Esperance, New York, and owned by Pax et Bonum, Inc. The station primarily carries satellite-fed programming by EWTN Radio. It is simulcast with co-owned WOPG (1460 AM) in Albany. The studios and offices are on Kenwood Avenue in Bethlehem.

The station broadcasts at 1,400 watts effective radiated power (ERP) and serves the Mohawk Valley and Capital District.

== History ==
WOPG is the newest radio station in the Mohawk Valley region, having signed on November 3, 2010. The station is a "rimshot" into both Albany and Utica, and has its transmitter at a former microwave tower located near Cherry Valley, New York.

In October 2013, Pax et Bonum announced that it would acquire WDDY (1460 AM) from The Walt Disney Company. WDDY had carried programming from Radio Disney; when that network decided to give up most of its radio stations, AM 1460 was available for purchase. Upon the deal's completion, that station was renamed WOPG and became a simulcast of WOPG-FM. Concurrently, the station relocated its studios to the 1460 transmitter site in Delmar, New York. The acquisition was made to improve WOPG-FM's reception in the Capital District, which is affected by terrain. For those listeners who cannot clearly receive the FM signal in the Capital District, they can still listen to 1460 AM.
