= WGY-FM =

Simulcast of WGY, Schenectady
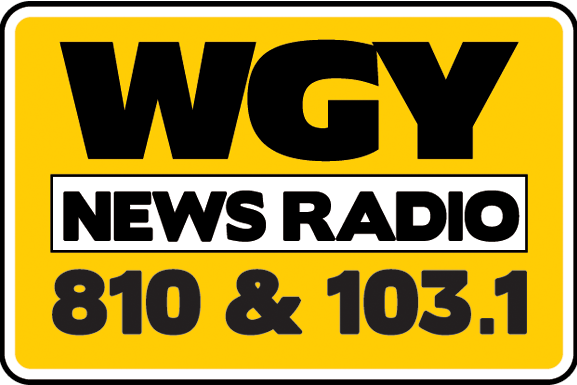
- Albany, New York; United States
- Broadcast area: Capital District
- Frequency: 103.1 MHz (HD Radio)
- Branding: News Radio 103.1 and 810 WGY

Programming
- Format: Talk radio
- Subchannels: HD2: Sports (WOFX)
- Affiliations: Fox News Radio; Premiere Networks; Westwood One; Compass Media Networks

Ownership
- Owner: iHeartMedia, Inc.; (iHM Licenses, LLC)
- Sister stations: WGY, WKKF, WOFX, WPYX, WRVE, WTRY-FM

History
- First air date: September 1, 1966
- Former call signs: WHRL (1966–2010)
- Call sign meaning: derived from sister station WGY (AM)

Technical information
- Licensing authority: FCC
- Facility ID: 55490
- Class: A
- ERP: 5,600 watts
- HAAT: 103 meters (338 ft)
- Transmitter coordinates: 42°47′32.3″N 74°0′42.5″W

Links
- Public license information: Public file; LMS
- Webcast: Listen live (via iHeartRadio)
- Website: wgy.iheart.com

WGY-FM (103.1 FM) is a commercial radio station licensed to Albany, New York, United States, serving the Capital District of New York. It simulcasts a talk radio format with WGY (810 AM); the stations are owned by iHeartMedia with studios on Troy-Schenectady Road in Latham.

WGY-FM's antenna is located off Lape Road in North Greenbush, New York, near U.S. Route 4.

== History ==
=== Easy listening and soft AC ===
The station signed on the air on September 1, 1966. Its original call sign was WHRL, airing a beautiful music format under the moniker Whirl. It played mostly lush instrumental cover versions of popular songs, along with Broadway and Hollywood show tunes.

The easy listening format gradually added more soft vocals to the playlist the next two decades. It eventually eliminated all but a few instrumentals and made the transition to soft adult contemporary in 1987. It was known as "Easy 103.1" and "The Breeze".

=== Smooth Jazz ===
Around 1995, WHRL officially flipped to smooth jazz. It played contemporary jazz instrumentals mixed with some soft pop and R&B vocals.

WHRL enjoyed success in the smooth jazz format. Radio & Records reported on WHRL's "net gains" success on August 25, 1995, noting "WHRL Albany climbed from about a half share to over two in the same demo for a 214% increase." Similarly, in 1997, Radio & Records reported that "WHRL surged 2.5-3.4 12+." Before transitioning to all-smooth jazz, WHRL had played operas on the weekend and big band, only playing smooth jazz on the morning drive, but these were scrapped and WHRL added dayparts, or segments during the day, of smooth jazz. The change was well received. Brant Curtiss, the Operations Manager at the time said that "listener reaction, via phones and e-mail, has been extremely positive. WHRL went from two or three daily complaints (some urging them to convert more quickly) to a over dozen listeners each day asking for title and album information of the new music they had begun playing. Smooth jazz is not just wallpaper music in Albany."

At this time, the new smooth jazz format was marketed with word-of-mouth because there was not the kind of budget for a large television and print campaign like smooth jazz stations in larger markets could afford. In this effort, WHRL launched its website in 1997, as well as a "Jazz Club" that listeners could join. In going through this change to all-smooth jazz, WHRL more than doubled its cume (cumulative audience) from 1996 to 1997. The station's "Today's Jazz" iteration logo had 103.1 on top of "TODAY'S JAZZ" written in a stylized font, above the station number which appeared on the bottom.

Today's Jazz used clips from Spyro Gyra's "Morning Dance" and Rick Braun's "Club Harlem" featuring Peter White as bumpers. WHRL aimed for "stress management" with its song list and format. In 1999, Brant Curtiss, then DJ, Station Programmer, and Director/Creative Services for WHRL described the station:

"Our ratings rise continuously through the day. During evenings with our 'Today's Jazz Tonight' and 'Lights Out' programs, the numbers go through the roof - No. 1 and 2 in certain demos - and we are kicking the hell out of 41 stations in Albany. That's because the format fits the function, and our function is stress management. When people leave work and are driving home, we're like a decompression chamber for them. It's sad, but our morning show is almost not a factor: middays are more like morning for us. That doesn't mean you should waste mornings; you've got to go after it. With great songs like "Urban Turban," Kombo and Brian Tarquin's "Darlin' Darlin' Baby," you can pump up your sound. They have very strong hooks. Songs that are very smooth complement them and offer balance."

==== Ownership changes ====
Dame Media Inc. purchased WHRL in 1996 from Regal Broadcasting, Inc. of Rensselaer. Dame Media paid $2.63 million. That year, Congress had enacted new ownership rules raising the limit in the market size of the Capital Region from four stations to seven. The enactment precipitated a seller's market. At the time of Dame Media's purchase, WHRL had a 1.7 percent share of listeners aged 12 and up putting it in 12th place in the area. In 1994, the station had a revenue of $500,000.

In 1997, Dame Media hired Peter Baumann as station manager of WHRL "Today's Jazz". Previously, Baumann had been director of sales for other Capital District Radio Stations WPYX and WTRY. Another Dame Media hire in that year was Brant Curtiss as operations manager for WHRL. Previously Curtiss had been production director of stations in Harrisburg, Pennsylvania. Dame Media Inc. was acquired by Clear Channel Communications Inc. in 1998 for $85 million in stock and debt.

==== WHRL activities and promotions ====
Today's Jazz produced its own smooth jazz compilations from time to time. In 1998 the station released a compilation album with nine tracks that was available retail at Hollywood Video and sold for $7.95. A portion of the proceeds from the purchase of the compilation benefited the Y-ME National Breast Cancer Organization. The track list included songs by Spyro Gyra, Diana Krall, George Benson, and Lee Ritenour.

The station published a newsletter called "WHRL Smooth Jazz Scene" that featured "the lowdown on upcoming events plus cool photos of your favorite WHRL personalities". The newsletter could be picked up in the Capitol region at over twenty retail locations. In 1997, WHRL acquired a station van that had the 103.1 "Today's Jazz" logo emblazoned on the side.

==== 1999 transfer of smooth jazz to 104.9 FM WZMR ====
Clear Channel Communications (now iHeartMedia) purchased Dame Media in 1999. With the new ownership, WHRL's future became cloudy and rumors of a format change circulated. Clear Channel decided to discontinue the smooth jazz programming on WHRL in 1999. The decision was met with public outcry.

In response to the public support of WHRL 103.1, Albany Broadcasting (now Pamal Broadcasting) picked up the smooth jazz format for its 104.9 WZMR. Albany Broadcasting's Vice President of Programming concurred.

Today's Jazz WHRL continued to sponsor and promote jazz in the Capital Region right up until its departure in October 1999; for example, WHRL sponsored A Night of Jazz at the New York State Museum on September 9, 1999, featuring a live performance by jazz guitarist Dwight Sills.

==== Smooth jazz exits 104.9 ====
In June 2003, 104.9 incorporated smooth jazz and R&B oldies as "104.9 Love FM" to reach a broader audience. However, by 2005, smooth jazz had permanently been taken off the air in the Capital District. In December, the station began playing Christmas music in advance of the holiday.

In January 2005, 104.9 FM was still playing Christmas music for a few more days. It switched to country music, simulcasting co-owned "Froggy Country 107.1" in Glens Falls.

=== Channel 103-1 ===
The smooth jazz format on 103.1 gave way to modern rock Channel 103.1 on October 2, 1999. That was two weeks after former sister station WQBK-FM (now owned by Townsquare Media) flipped from modern rock to active rock. The first song played by Channel 103-1 was "Driven to Tears" by The Police. Slogans used by the station included "Albany's New Music Alternative", "Albany's New Rock Alternative", and eventually "Where You Rock" during its active rock format.

In 2009, WHRL adopted Clear Channel's Premium Choice active rock format, becoming musically identical outside of morning drive time to sister stations KBRU in Oklahoma City and KIOC in Beaumont. WHRL became the third active rock station in the Albany market in addition to competitors WZMR and WQBK-FM. During this period, the Albany market had the highest number of active rock stations for an American radio market, until WZMR flipped to country on February 26, 2010.

Throughout its history as a rock station, it played many alternative, punk, goth, emo, and metal bands and artists, including Avenged Sevenfold, Disturbed, Korn, Linkin Park, Slipknot, and Atreyu. The station also held concerts known as the Channel 103-1 Big Day Out every summer until 2010, featuring modern and active rock artists.

=== WGY-FM News/Talk ===
When WHRL flipped to active rock in 2009, the Clear Channel-Regent non-compete clause, which was previously used when WBZZ flipped from Hot AC to AC, was invoked. With WQBK-FM also playing active rock, WHRL ended its hard rock sound. Clear Channel decided to flip 103.1 WHRL to a talk radio simulcast of 810 WGY. WHRL had been reporting as an active rock station on Mediabase since 2008. Mediabase is owned by the station's parent company, iHeartMedia.

At 12:01 am on September 20, 2010, WHRL played its last song, "New Divide" by Linkin Park. WHRL dropped its active rock format and began simulcasting the same programming as 810 WGY. In addition, the station changed its call sign to WGY-FM. (A co-owned station on 99.5 FM, now WRVE, had been called WGY-FM from 1988 to 1994.)

== Programming ==
Local hosts on WGY include Bob Lonsberry and Dave Allen; the remainder of the lineup is devoted to nationally syndicated conservative talk shows.

== HD Radio operations ==
In 2005, WHRL upgraded to IBOC digital radio alongside the rest of Clear Channel's Albany stations. On August 17, 2006, WHRL began airing an HD2 subchannel with a "Classic Alternative" format. With WHRL dumping active rock for a WGY simulcast, the station's HD2 signal was changed from the classic alternative format to a sports radio simulcast of WOFX Fox Sports 980 the same day.

== Logos ==
WGY-FM's first logo as WHRL Channel 103.1, 1999-2001

WGY-FM's final logo under the Channel 103.1 format, 2005–2010

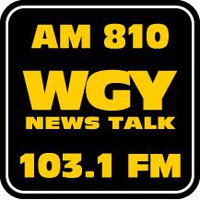
WGY-FM's logo as WGY News Talk, 2010–2013

== See also ==
- List of three-letter broadcast call signs in the United States
