= WOPG (AM) =

Coordinates: 42°37′21.29″N 73°48′7.44″W

- Albany, New York; United States
- Broadcast area: Capital District
- Frequency: 1460 kHz

Programming
- Format: Catholic radio
- Affiliations: EWTN Radio

Ownership
- Owner: Pax et Bonum, Inc.
- Sister stations: WOPG-FM

History
- First air date: June 14, 1924 (in New York City, moved to Albany in 1931) (Note: Current license dates from October 21, 1947.)
- Former call signs: WDBX (1924–1925); WOKO (1925–1983); WWCN (1983–1987); WOKO (1987–1988); WGNA (1988–2002); WDDY (2002–2014)
- Call sign meaning: "Words Of Peace and Goodness"

Technical information
- Licensing authority: FCC
- Facility ID: 72117
- Class: B
- Power: 5,000 watts

Links
- Public license information: Public file; LMS
- Webcast: Listen live
- Website: pax-et-bonum-radio.org

WOPG (1460 kHz) is an AM radio station licensed to Albany, New York, and serving the Capital District. It is owned by Pax et Bonum, Inc. (Peace and Goodness in Latin) and has a Christian radio format aimed at Roman Catholic listeners, with much of its programming coming from the EWTN Radio network. WOPG simulcasts with WOPG-FM 89.9 in Esperance, New York.

WOPG operates with 5,000 watts of power non-directional by day, and employs a directional antenna at night to protect other stations on AM 1460. The transmitter site is on Kenwood Avenue in Delmar, New York.

== History ==
According to FCC records, WOPG only dates back to October 21, 1947, when it was authorized, as WOKO, to replace an earlier WOKO whose license had been revoked. However, the 1947 authorization inherited its predecessor's call letters, as well as its frequency. For these reasons, it is almost universally recognized as a direct continuation of the original WOKO, which dated to 1924. This makes WOPG the oldest station licensed in Albany, and the third-oldest in the Capital District.

=== Establishment in New York City ===
The original WOKO was first licensed, with the sequentially issued call letters WDBX, in June 1924 to Otto Baur at 138 Dyckman Street in New York City. The initial authorization was for only 5 watts transmitting on 1290 kHz, and the station referred to itself as "New York's Smallest Radio Station". In 1925 WDBX's power was increased to 50 watts, and its call sign changed to WOKO.

In mid-1926 the station was purchased by Harold E. Smith and moved north of New York City to Peekskill. In early 1928 the station made a move further north, setting up the station's transmitter on Mount Beacon in southern Dutchess County and serving Poughkeepsie and Newburgh from the Hotel Windsor in Poughkeepsie. WOKO was billed as "The Voice from the Clouds" for its transmitter site on one of the highest mountains in the Hudson Valley. On November 11, 1928, under the provisions of the Federal Radio Commission's General Order 40, WOKO was assigned to 1440 kHz.

The Newburgh-Poukeepsie area of the Hudson Valley was still largely undeveloped, with few advertising opportunities. Without a network affiliation, and limited nighttime hours due to having to share its frequency with WHEC-WABO in Rochester, the station was unprofitable. In late 1929 Harold E. Smith contacted Sam Pickard, vice president in charge of station relations for the CBS Radio Network, to see if WOKO could become a CBS affiliate. Pickard determined that the station did not meet the standards for affiliation. However, Pickard told Smith his station would qualify if it were to move to Albany and expand its hours of operation.

=== Move to Albany ===
WOKO received approval from the Federal Radio Commission (FRC) to make the changes suggested by Pickard. On April 17, 1931, the station was authorized to begin broadcasting full-time from Albany on 1430 kHz. It was the first radio station licensed to New York's state capital. WGY had signed on from nearby Schenectady in 1922, followed later that year by WHAZ in Troy. The station became profitable, due to its expanded hours of operation, combined with CBS's lineup of comedies, news, sports, soap operas, game shows and big band broadcasts during the "Golden Age of Radio". With the implementation of the North American Regional Broadcasting Agreement in March 1941, stations on 1430 kHz, including WOKO, shifted to 1460 kHz, its assignment ever since.

=== License revocation and reassignment ===
WOKO's license came up for its periodic renewal on October 1, 1942. However, before the renewal process began, the Federal Communications Commission (FCC) unearthed evidence that the station owner, WOKO, Inc., had not fully disclosed the company's stockholders. It emerged that in return for his aid in the station moving to Albany as the Capital District's CBS affiliate, Sam Pickard had acquired 240 shares of the company's 1,000 shares of stock. This had not been disclosed in WOKO's financial reports to the FRC and the FCC over the past 12 years. In 1943, Sam Pickard's wife, Francke, attempted to dispose of the 240 shares for $75,000, but the FCC blocked the sale. The FCC launched an investigation into whether WOKO, Inc. was qualified to be a licensee. On March 27, 1945, the Commission "concluded that the applicant cannot be entrusted with the responsibilities of a licensee" and denied renewal of WOKO's license.

This ruling was appealed to the United States Court of Appeals for the District of Columbia, which reversed the FCC's decision on the grounds that "The denial of renewal because of the applicant's failure to show the beneficial ownership of twenty-four per cent of its capital cannot be justified as a penalty for making false statements." However, on subsequent appeal the Supreme Court reversed the Appeals Court decision, and ruled on December 9, 1946, that the revocation was appropriate.

At this time WOKO was one of only two stations licensed to Albany, so to limit the disruption of the station going silent the FCC issued a series of temporary authorizations allowing it to continue broadcasting until its successor was operational. A hearing was held reviewing three competing applications for WOKO's replacement, and on October 21, 1947, the FCC chose the Governor Dongan Broadcasting Corporation. While Governor Dongan technically received a new license unrelated to the original WOKO, it inherited the WOKO call sign, frequency, and CBS affiliation, meaning that functionally it was a continuation of its predecessor.

As of January 1, 1947, WOKO lost the CBS affiliation to upstart WTRY (now WOFX) in Troy. WOKO became an independent, locally focused station with a format consisting largely of music, a rarity in that era for a market of the Capital District's size. The station also carried Brooklyn Dodgers baseball games in the 1950s before the team's move to Los Angeles. In the 1950s and early 60s, WOKO aired a full service, middle of the road format of popular music, news and sports. In an opening paragraph of Ian Fleming's 1962 novel The Spy Who Loved Me, protagonist Vivienne Michel travels to central New York state and recounts listening to WOKO, with the parenthetical comment "they might have dreamed up a grander callsign!".

=== Country music ===
In the late 1960s, WOKO decided to go after an audience that was not well-served in the Capital District. Under station manager Charles Murn, WOKO flipped to country music. Charlie Heisler was the Chief Engineer. In the early 1960s, WOKO's lineup was led by Geoff Davis (formerly of WROW in Albany and WINS in New York City). Bob Cathcart, from Hoosick Falls, was the News Anchor.

The station's country format lasted until 1978 after competition from FM rival WGNA-FM led WOKO to change formats. For a short time it tried disco music. Coming into the format right after the peak of the disco fad and having to battle two decades of country heritage, the new format failed. In early 1980, WOKO returned to country. Though initially regaining some audience, the flip of the more powerful WPTR to country later that year wiped away any gains the station had made.

=== All News and oldies ===
On August 23, 1982, WOKO ended its second attempt at country by flipping to an all-news radio format, carrying the audio from CNN Headline News (then CNN2) most of the day with sports from the Enterprise Radio Network at night. With this flip came a new call sign: WWCN, with the last two letters standing for CNN. Though lower in overhead, the new station also retained the low ratings of the previous format and soon added some talk programming. WWCN continued to struggle and left the format in early 1987.

The demise of WWCN led to the return of the WOKO call sign, this time running an oldies format and converting to C-QUAM AM stereo (only the second station in the market, behind WPTR, to do so). This format was short lived.

WOKO was purchased by Barnstable Broadcasting, then owners of WGNA-FM, with the sale closing in late 1988. Barnstable then took WOKO to a simulcast of its new FM sister for most of the day. It did air some separate special programming and Albany-Colonie Yankees games, when not carrying country music programming. The AM station switched its call sign to WGNA while the FM station became WGNA-FM. (Note: In 1990, the WOKO call letters resurfaced in Burlington, Vermont, at a newly launched country station at the behest of an employee who wished to honor the original WOKO.) This arrangement would last for over a decade through several owners. Regent Communications acquired WGNA-AM-FM in 2000, and the 1460 frequency was put up for sale.

=== Radio Disney ===
In March 2002, Regent sold the station to the Walt Disney Company, who converted it to the Radio Disney children's radio format on February 28, 2002. It was the only Disney-owned outlet in Upstate New York, although a local owner in the Syracuse area converted several of his stations to Radio Disney as well.

The call sign for 1460 were then changed to WDDY on April 23, 2002. The Disney format lasted more than a decade. In June 2013, Disney put WDDY and six other Radio Disney stations in medium markets up for sale, to refocus the network's broadcast distribution on Top-25 markets. On September 29, 2013, WDDY dropped the Radio Disney programming and went silent.

=== Catholic radio ===
In October, Disney filed to sell WDDY to Pax et Bonum, owner of WOPG-FM in Esperance. The acquisition was made to improve the signal for Catholic radio in the Capital District. Pax et Bonum converted the station to noncommercial operation as a simulcast of WOPG-FM, from studios at the AM station's Delmar transmitter site. The sale was consummated on January 17, 2014, the station resumed operations on January 29, 2014, and its call sign was changed to WOPG on February 27, 2014.
