= WOFX (AM) =

Fox Sports Radio station in Troy–Albany, New York

- Troy, New York; United States
- Broadcast area: Capital District; Adirondacks; Berkshires
- Frequency: 980 kHz
- Branding: Fox Sports 980 & 95.9 FM

Programming
- Format: Sports
- Affiliations: Fox Sports Radio; Boston Red Sox Radio Network; Buffalo Bills Radio Network

Ownership
- Owner: iHeartMedia, Inc.; (iHM Licenses, LLC)
- Sister stations: WGY; WGY-FM; WKKF; WPYX; WRVE; WTRY-FM

History
- First air date: April 15, 1940
- Former call signs: WTRY (1940–2000)
- Call sign meaning: "Fox"

Technical information
- Licensing authority: FCC
- Facility ID: 37233
- Class: B
- Power: 5,000 watts
- Transmitter coordinates: 42°46′56″N 73°50′07″W
- Translator: 95.9 W240EC (Albany)
- Repeater: 103.1 WGY-FM-HD2 (Albany)

Links
- Public license information: Public file; LMS
- Webcast: Listen live (via iHeartRadio)
- Website: foxsports980.iheart.com

WOFX (980 AM) is a radio station licensed to Troy, New York. The station is owned by iHeartMedia and runs a sports format and is the Fox Sports Radio affiliate for the Capital District, Adirondacks, and Berkshires.

== Programming ==
Much of WOFX's schedule is programming from Fox Sports Radio. Previously, WOFX aired Imus in the Morning, a program which predated the sports format. However the show was taken off the schedule at the end of 2006 and replaced by Fox Sports Radio's Steve Czaban. WOFX was also once home to Jay Mohr's syndicated midday sports show. WOFX is the Albany market home to the syndicated Cigar Dave show.

In addition to sports talk, the station clears a sizeable amount of play by play on both the local and national levels. WOFX currently is home to New York Knicks basketball, and Buffalo Bills football. It carries University at Albany college football and men's basketball, some Syracuse University football and basketball games not heard on WGY, plus the NCAA Men's Division I Basketball Championship among other events.

In the rare case of play by play conflicts, the latter games are usually heard on sister WTRY-FM, a procedure that has become more solidly done in the wake of the mild success of UAlbany football and the success of the Mets in the 2006 season.

== History ==
From the station's sign-on in 1940 until 2000, the call sign was WTRY. Albany broadcasters WABY and WOKO petitioned the FCC to block approval of the new station and were denied. WTRY took to the air on 950 kHz with 1,000 watts of power, moving to 980 kHz on March 29, 1941, as part of the implementation of the North American Regional Broadcasting Agreement. WTRY was an affiliate of the CBS Radio Network, replacing WOKO. The station's original owner was Troy Broadcasting Co.

During its 63 years, led by principal owner C. George Taylor and others, WTRY gave birth or adopted three other stations at varying times: WTRI-FM 102.7 (in the early 1950s, later deleted), co-owned WTRI-TV channel 35 (later became WAST-TV 13 (1959–1981); now WNYT) from 1954 to 1955 with Van Curler Broadcasting, and WTRY-FM 106.5 (now WPYX).

When WROW took the CBS affiliation in 1954, WTRY briefly was the ABC affiliate before WPTR took that affiliation several years later. In the early 1960s, the station aired a Top 40 format (which gained a simulcast on 106.5 FM briefly in the early 1970s). The contemporary hits sound was maintained in some form until the early 1980s when it went through a long-term evolution which resulted in the station becoming oldies in 1986. In 1992, WTRY gained a simulcast on WTRY-FM 98.3 which ended in 1994, then regained in a mutual arrangement two years later in which the FM became primary and the AM secondary with the AM splitting for alternate programming at points.

WTRY went through several ownership changes. Follow the selling its stake in WTRI, Troy Broadcasting, changes its name to Tri-City Radio, Inc. in late winter of 1956. In 1965, the station was acquired by New Haven–based Kops-Monahan Communications. In 1972, WTRY and WTRY-FM were sold to Scott Broadcasting of Pennsylvania, Inc. In 1985, television personality Merv Griffin, through his company Merv Griffin Enterprises, brought the stations and then sold it in 1994 to Capstar Broadcasting (which was controlled by billionaire mogul Tom Hicks).

=== Expanded Band assignment ===
On March 17, 1997, the Federal Communications Commission (FCC) announced that 88 stations had been given permission to move to newly available "Expanded Band" transmitting frequencies, ranging from 1610 to 1700 kHz, with WTRY authorized to move from 980 to 1640 kHz. However, the station never procured the construction permit needed to implement the authorization, so the expanded band station was never built.

=== Later history ===
In 1999, Capstar merged with another Tom Hicks-owned company, Chancellor Media Corporation, to form AMFM Inc. After the merger of AMFM and Clear Channel Communications (now known as iHeartMedia) in 2000, WTRY and WTRY-FM 98.3 were permanently split with 980 AM flipping to sports and becoming WOFX while the oldies format stayed on 98.3 FM.

On September 20, 2010, with the flip of WHRL to a simulcast of talk radio WGY, WOFX's sports programming can now be heard on WGY-FM's HD2 channel.

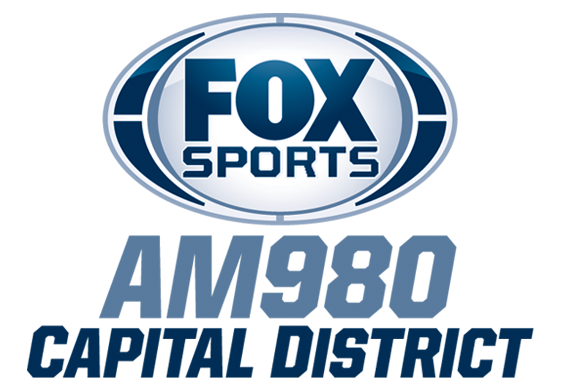
Logo used from 2013-2019 before translator sign on

Previously, WOFX has held the rights to the New York Giants (which were moved to sister WPYX), New York Jets football (currently on WQBK-FM), and New York Mets baseball. They were the home of Albany Devils (previously the Albany River Rats) hockey until the team relocated following the 2017 season. They were the home of Westwood One's coverage of the National Football League until 2019.

== See also ==
- List of radio stations in New York
