= Peg o' My Heart =

Peg o' My Heart may refer to:

- Peg o' My Heart (play), a 1912 comedy by J. Hartley Manners
  - Peg o' My Heart (1922 film), directed by King Vidor
  - Peg o' My Heart (1933 film), featuring Marion Davies
- Peg O' My Heart (2024 film), a 2024 Hong Kong film directed by Nick Cheung
- Peg o' My Heart (song), a popular song published in 1913
