= Manners v. Morosco =

- Supreme Court of the United States

Argued March 2, 1920 Decided March 22, 1920
- Full case name: Manners v. Morosco
- Citations: 252 U.S. 317 (more) 40 S. Ct. 335; 64 L. Ed. 590

Holding
- 1) The copyright transfer contract was not limited to five years because the agreement dealt in minimum requirements. 2) A transfer of the copyright for the production of a play on stage does not grant the ability to make a motion picture based on the play. However, a grant of exclusivity implies a negative guarantee that the original creator will not do anything that may adversely affect that exclusivity, meaning the author forfeited their own ability to authorize a motion picture production.

Court membership
- Chief Justice Edward D. White Associate Justices Joseph McKenna · Oliver W. Holmes Jr. William R. Day · Willis Van Devanter; Mahlon Pitney · James C. McReynolds; Louis Brandeis · John H. Clarke

Case opinions
- Majority: Holmes, joined by White, McKenna, Day, Van Devanter, McReynolds, Brandeis
- Dissent: Clarke, joined by Pitney

Manners v. Morosco, 252 U.S. 317 (1920), was a United States Supreme Court case with two principal holdings. First, the copyright transfer contract in question was not limited to five years because the agreement dealt in minimum requirements. Secondly, the transfer of the copyright for the production of a play on stage did not grant the ability to make a motion picture based on the play. However, a grant of exclusivity implies a negative guarantee that the original creator will not do anything that may adversely affect that exclusivity, meaning the author forfeited their own ability to authorize a motion picture production. The Court enjoined both parties from making a film version.

The case concerned Peg o' My Heart by J. Hartley Manners. A film version of the play was created in 1919 directed by William C. deMille and starring Wanda Hawley, but it was never released due to the legal issues raised by this case. Manners did produce a 1922 version starring his wife Laurette Taylor, and a 1933 version emerged later.

Justices John Hessin Clarke and Mahlon Pitney dissented because they saw nothing in the original or revised contract indicating that either party expected the agreement to last longer than five years.
