= Christine Norman =

American stage actress and playwright (born 1886/7)

- Norman in 1919
- Born: Anna Christine Norman; 1886/1887; Cincinnati, Ohio, U.S.
- Died: March 6, 1930; New York City, U.S.
- Other name: Mrs. Enos Booth
- Occupations: Actress, playwright
- Years active: 1909-1930
- Spouse: Enos S. Booth (1919 - 1930, her death)

Anna Christine Norman (1886/87-1930) was an American stage actress and playwright.

== Early years ==
Norman was the daughter of Andrew G. Norman and his wife Minnie. She studied acting in New York, winning a medal for her work, and then studied music in Paris.

== Career ==
Norman costarred with Constance Collier in Israel on Broadway in 1909. She appeared with Laurette Taylor in the huge Broadway hit Peg o' My Heart in 1912. In 1915 she scored another success costarring with Emily Stevens and Louis Bennison in The Unchastened Woman. Her other Broadway plays included Great Music (1924), The Nest (1922), The Crowded Hour (1918), Branded (1917), Upstairs and Down (1916), Our Children (1915), The Aviator (1910), Israel (1909), and An International Marriage (1909).

In the 1920s she wrote several plays to no distinction such as The Balcony Walkers in 1925 of which she had trouble finding a producer.

== Personal life ==
Norman married Enos Booth in 1919. In 1928, she tried unsuccessfully to divorce him.

She was considered a great Broadway beauty and had her portrait painted by Neysa McMein.

== Death and legacy ==
On March 6, 1930, Norman committed suicide by jumping from the 20th floor of her hotel. After her death, a publicized battle over her will between her mother, her husband and various lawyers was mounted in which eventually a substantial amount of money ($150,000) was left to her dog. (A contemporary Associated Press news story said, "The will divided an estate of $170,000 among 11 friends, ignoring the mother, Mrs. Minnie Mary Jamison, and the husband, Enos Booth ..." The amount left for perpetual care of her dog's grave was reported as $500 in other articles.) Bequests included $40,000 to John Hayden and $50,000 to Clare Cassell, described respectively in a newspaper article as "an ardent admirer" and "a close friend and international tennis star of the day".

== See also ==
- List of suicides (N–Z)
- Clara Bloodgood
- Adele Ritchie
- Leona Helmsley (who also left huge money to her dog)
