= Peg o' My Heart (song) =

1913 song

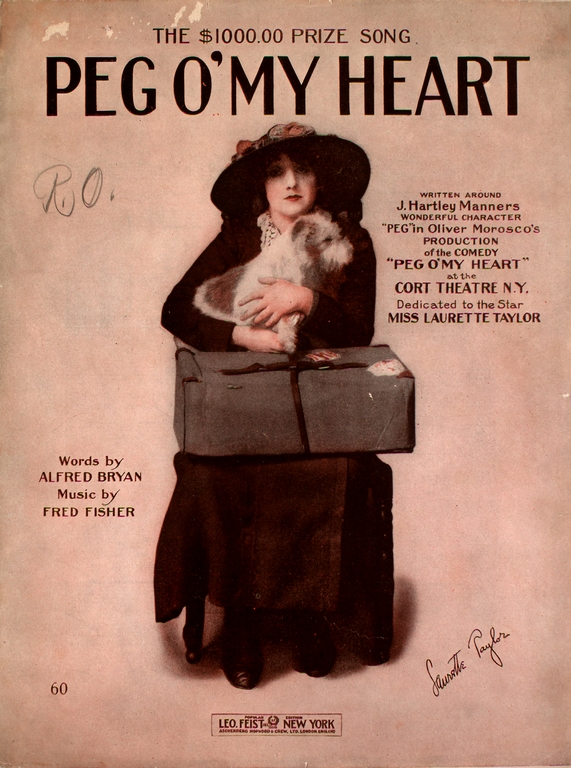
- 1913 sheet music cover with image of Laurette Taylor in her title role in the play.

Song
- Published: March 15, 1913
- Composer: Fred Fisher
- Lyricist: Alfred Bryan

"Peg o' My Heart" is a popular song with lyrics by Alfred Bryan and music by Fred Fisher. It was published on March 15, 1913 and it featured in the 1913 musical Ziegfeld Follies.

The song was first performed publicly by Irving Kaufman in 1912 at The College Inn in New York City after he had stumbled across a draft of sheet music on a shelf at the Leo Feist offices.

The song was inspired by the main character in the very successful Broadway play of the time, Peg o' My Heart, that debuted December 20, 1912 at the Cort Theatre in NYC. The play was written by J. Hartley Manners and starred Laurette Taylor in the title role. Taylor appeared on the cover of early published sheet music.

== Notable recordings ==
Notable recordings of the song include:

- Charles W. Harrison
  - Label: Victor 17412 (matrix: 13628-2)
  - Recorded: July 24, 1913
- Henry Burr
  - Label: Columbia A-1404 (matrix: 38980-2)
  - Recorded: August 1, 1913
- Walter Van Brunt
  - Edison, Blue Amberol 2036
  - Released: September 1913
- Bunny Berigan & his Orchestra
  - Label: Victor 27258 (matrix: 043925)
  - Recorded: New York City November 28, 1939
- Lester Young Trio
  - Label: Clef MGC 135 (matrix: 353-1)
  - Released: 1953
  - Recorded: Hollywood April 1946
- The Harmonicats
  - Label: Vitacoustic Records 1
  - Released: March 1947
  - First entered the Billboard magazine chart on April 18, on charts 21 weeks, peaking at #1
- Buddy Clark with orchestra directed by Mitchell Ayres
  - Label: Columbia 37392 (matrix: CO 37671)
  - Recorded: New York City April 25, 1947
  - First entered the Billboard magazine chart on June 27, on charts 7 weeks, peaking at #4
- Art Lund with orchestra conducted by Johnny Thompson
  - Label: MGM 10037 (matrix: 47-S-3077-3)
  - Recorded: in Los Angeles, California May 12, 1947
  - First entered the Billboard magazine chart on June 20, on charts 10 weeks, peaking at #6
- Clark Dennis
  - Label: Capitol 346
  - First entered the Billboard magazine chart on July 4, 1947, on charts 1 week, at #10
- The Three Suns
  - Label: RCA Victor 20-2272
  - First entered the Billboard magazine chart on June 20, 1947, on charts 16 weeks, peaking at #2
- Joe Loss and his Orchestra
  - Label: His Master's Voice BD 5987
  - Recorded: London on October 13, 1947
- Gene Vincent and His Bluecaps
  - Album: Bluejean Bop!
  - Label: Capitol Records
  - Released: 13 August 1956
- Robert Maxwell His Harp and Orchestra
  - Released 1964: #64 on the US, Hot 100
- Andy Williams
  - Album: The Shadow of Your Smile (1966)
- Celtic punk band Dropkick Murphys covered the song on their 2011 album, Going Out in Style. Their version features a guest appearance by Bruce Springsteen.

== In other media ==
"Peg o' My Heart" featured in the 1949 film Oh, You Beautiful Doll, a fictionalized biography of Fred Fisher, a German-born American writer of Tin Pan Alley songs. (Mark Stevens) turns serious composer Fred Breitenbach (S. Z. Sakall) into songwriter Fred Fisher. Fred Fisher is his assumed name in real life and Breitenbach is his birth surname. In the film, many Fisher songs were given a symphonic arrangement that was performed at Aeolian Hall. Among the other Fisher songs heard were "Chicago," "Dardanella," and "Who Paid the Rent for Mrs. Rip Van Winkle". Mark Stevens (dubbed by Bill Shirley) and June Haver (dubbed by Bonnie Lou Williams) sing "Peg o' My Heart" as a duet. The film was released on November 11, 1949.

The song, performed by Max Harris and his Novelty Trio (based on the Harmonicats' 1947 version), was used as the theme of the BBC miniseries The Singing Detective (1986). When recording engineer Bill Putnam recorded the Harmonicats' version of the song, he utilized the bathroom of Universal Recording as an echo chamber and became the first person to use artificial reverberation creatively on a pop recording.

In the 2010 ITV drama Downton Abbey, episode 4 season 1 features William, the second footman, playing "Peg o' My Heart" on the piano in the servants' hall.
