= H. Reeves-Smith =

English actor (1862–1938)

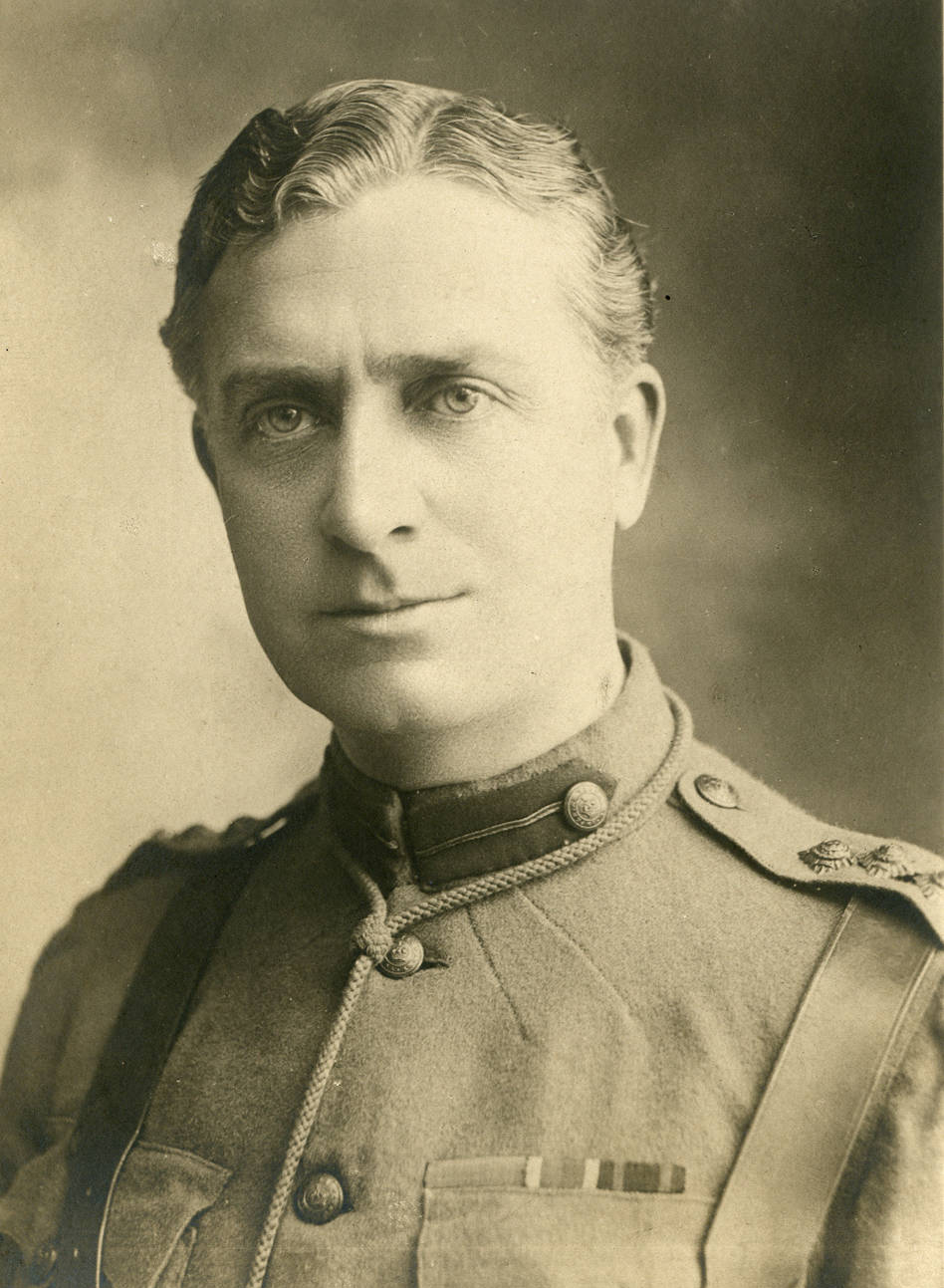
- Born: Harry Reeves-Smith; 17 May 1862; Scarborough, England
- Died: 29 January 1938 (aged 75); Ewell, Surrey, England
- Occupation: Actor
- Years active: 1880s–1935

Harry Reeves-Smith (17 May 1862 – 29 January 1938) was an English born stage actor who achieved success in Broadway productions at the turn of the twentieth century. His father was G. Reeves-Smith, a manager of the Brighton Aquarium. Harry made his first appearance on stage in 1878 at Halifax in Jane Shore. He went to the U.S. in 1887 and toured with John Sleeper Clarke.

In the U.S. Reeves-Smith toured with actresses Henrietta Crosman and Grace George. He is mainly remembered for appearing in several hit plays. Ethel Barrymore became a stage star in Clyde Fitch's Captain Jinks of the Horse Marines (1901) but Reeves-Smith's character Robert Jinks is the title of the play. In 1903 he starred in another play written by Fitch at the Comedy Theatre in London's West End; the role of Edward Warden in The Climbers. In 1910 he appeared in another play with Barrymore, Mid-Channel, about a feuding couple. In 1912 he was opposite Laurette Taylor in her huge success Peg o' My Heart. In The Unchastened Woman (1915) the star was Emily Stevens. His last Broadway part was as Johan Strauss in The Great Waltz in 1935, at the age of 73.

== Films ==
Reeves-Smith appeared in only three motion pictures, two silents and one sound. His last was The Return of Sherlock Holmes (1929) with Clive Brook, which holds the distinction of being the first Sherlock Holmes film to be shot in sound and Reeves-Smith the first Dr. Watson in a sound film.

Reeves-Smith retired to his native England but soon after died of a heart attack at Ewell, Surrey on 29 January 1938.
