= Happiness (1924 film) =

1924 film directed by King Vidor

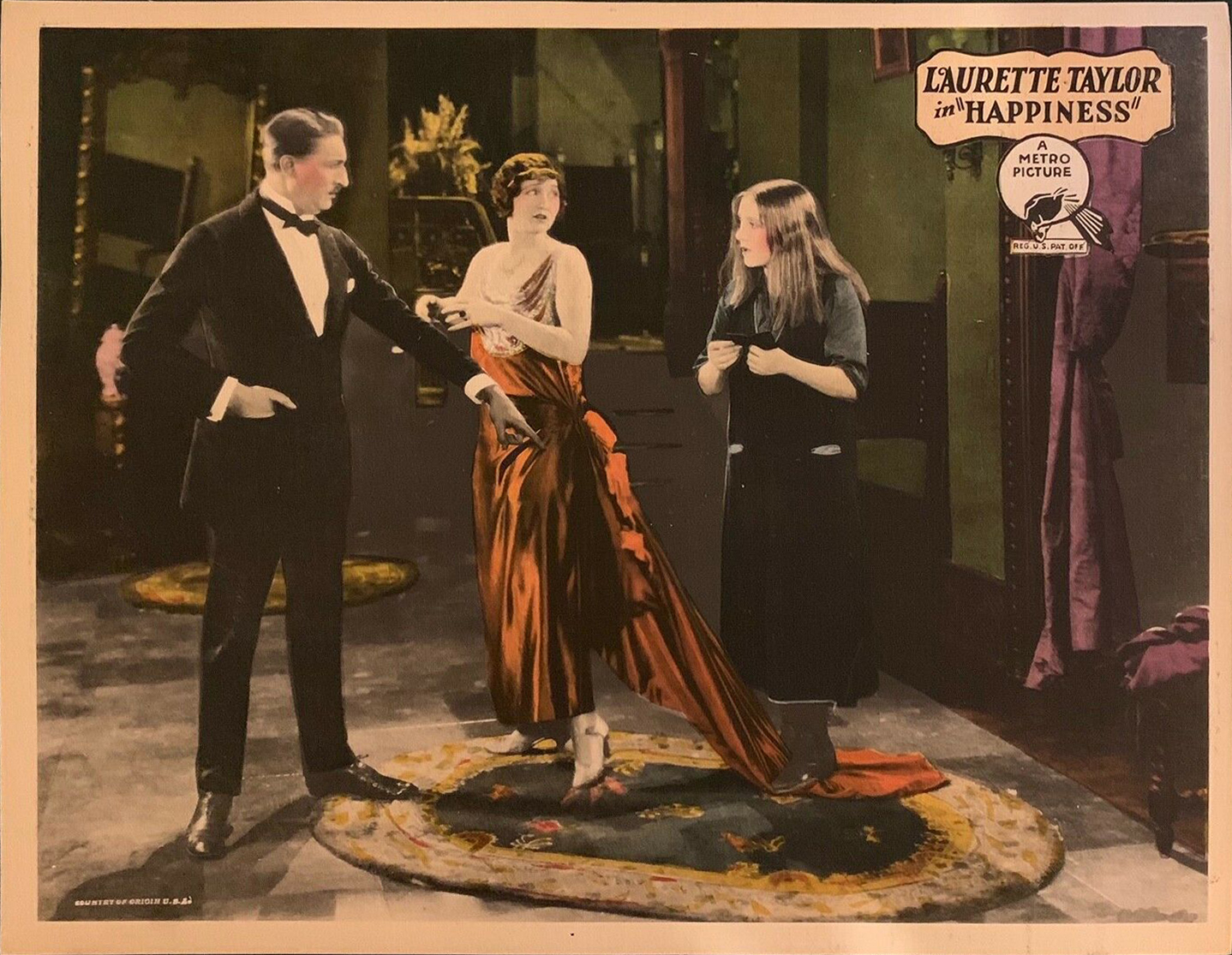
- Lobby card
- Directed by: King Vidor
- Screenplay by: J. Hartley Manners
- Based on: Happiness by J. Hartley Manners
- Starring: Laurette Taylor
- Cinematography: Chester A. Lyons
- Production company: Metro Pictures
- Distributed by: Metro Pictures
- Release date: March 10, 1924
- Running time: 76 minutes; 8 reels
- Country: United States
- Language: Silent (English intertitles)

Happiness is a 1924 American silent comedy film directed by King Vidor and starring stage actress Laurette Taylor in one of her rare film appearances. The film is based on the 1914 Broadway play of the same name written by Taylor's husband J. Hartley Manners.

== Plot ==
As described in a film magazine review, Jenny Wray, the sole support of her mother, obtains work in a modiste's shop. She is called on to deliver several gowns to Mrs. Chrystal Pole. Mrs. Pole, who is bored with life, becomes interested in Jenny's philosophy of happiness, and induces her to make her home at the Pole mansion. However, Jenny soon tires of it and returns to Brooklyn. She continues to cultivate the friendship of Mrs. Pole, who aids her in her efforts to have her own modiste's shop. Fermoy MacDonough, an electrician, falls in love with Jenny and they marry. In several years Jenny has a shop of her own and continues to spread happiness.

== Cast ==
- Laurette Taylor as Jenny Wray
- Pat O'Malley as Fermoy MacDonough
- Hedda Hopper as Mrs. Chrystal Pole
- Cyril Chadwick as Philip Chandos
- Edith Yorke as Mrs. Wreay
- Patterson Dial as Sallie Perkins
- Joan Standing as Jenny
- Lawrence Grant as Mr. Rosselstein
- Charlotte Mineau as Head Saleslady
- Maxine Elliott Hicks (uncredited)
- Dorothy Seay as Little Girl (uncredited)

== Production ==
Happiness marked the second and final cinematic collaboration between Vidor and well-known stage actress Laurette Taylor. Based on the one-act play of the same name by Taylor's husband J. Hartley Manners the film adaption was a box office success, due in part to Vidor's personal interest in the theme and Taylor's, restrained performance

Taylor would make one more movie with M-G-M studios in 1924, One Night in Rome, directed by Clarence Badger.

== Theme ==
Manners' vehicle for Laurette Taylor is largely a facsimile of his 1912 play Peg o' My Heart, with the setting moved from rural British Isles to the urban New York City.

The film version introduces a new facet to Manners' "creaky" scenario. Vidor's identification with the Populist movement and its pro-agrarian and pro-nativist ideals is enlarged in Happiness to include a broader spectrum of the working class, including poor and urban immigrants. The entrepreneurial Jenny (Taylor) struggles in this Brooklyn lower-class milieu to ultimately achieve social and financial security. Vidor makes explicit his political philosophy when the now successful Jenny encounters her early alter-ego, a poor, but ambitious girl (also named Jenny) on the streets of Brooklyn, with the inter-title "And the endless chain of Jennys goes on in all big cities..."

== Preservation ==
Prints of Happiness are preserved at the George Eastman Museum and Gosfilmofond (Russian State archives) Moscow.
