= Adele Ritchie =

American actress (1874–1930)

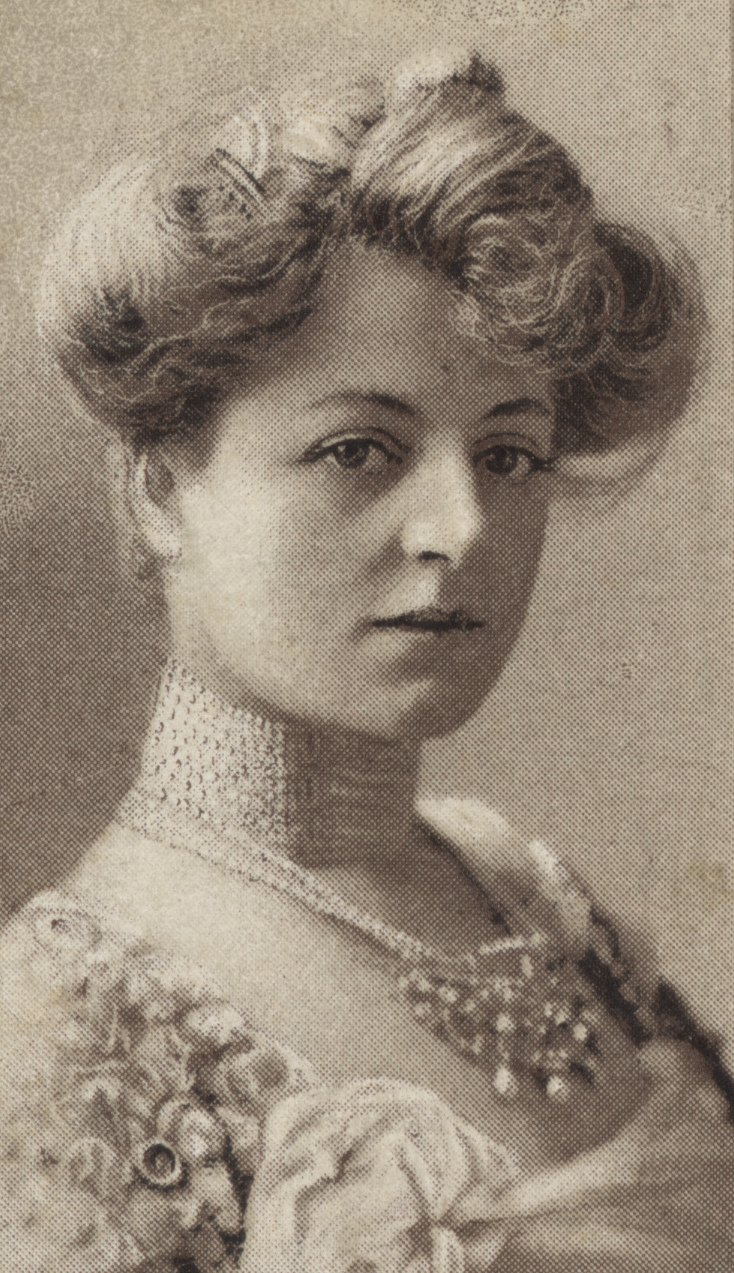
- Born: December 21, 1874; Philadelphia, Pennsylvania, U.S.
- Died: April 24, 1930 (aged 55); Laguna Beach, California, U.S.
- Occupations: Comic opera, musical comedy and vaudeville performer

Adele Ritchie (December 21, 1874 – April 24, 1930) was an American prima donna of comic opera and star of Edwardian musical comedies and vaudeville. Her career began in the early 1890s and continued for nearly twenty-five years. She killed a friend, then herself in a murder–suicide.

== Early life and career ==
Ritchie was born in Philadelphia, Pennsylvania, the daughter of Quaker parents of French descent and, by the age of three, the step-daughter of Jacob Benclift Pultz, founder of the J.B. Pultz Company. She attended the Catholic girl’s preparatory school, Villa Maria Academy at Malvern, and made her first stage appearance as a singer in a production of a French comedy entitled The Isle of Champagne at Miner's Fifth Avenue Theatre on June 5, 1893. With the aid of Reginald De Koven, Ritchie appeared in the fall of 1893 at the Park Theatre, Philadelphia, playing a minor role in his comic opera, The Algerians. Her rendition of "Song of the Rose" became an audience favorite when The Algerians appeared in New York at the Garden Theatre and later Daly's Theatre. When Marie Tempest, the prima donna, left the production at the end of the year, Ritchie was chosen as her replacement. The Algerians like many other road tours found it difficult to achieve profitability in the face of the economic consequences resulting from the Panic of 1893.

On July 14, 1894, Ritchie and the German tenor Conrad Behrens sang with the Sousa Band in a summer concert performed at Manhattan Beach, Brooklyn. At Abbey's Theatre, that September, Ritchie opened as Princess Mirane in The Devil’s Deputy, an operetta adapted from the French by J. Cheever Goodwin and composer Edward Jakobowski. The following week she was replaced by the more experienced Amanda Fabris, who manager Al Canby and lead actor Francis Wilson felt would give the stronger performance. Ritchie was next engaged at the American Theatre in January 1895 as Madge Brainerd in the Harrison Grey Fiske political drama The District Attorney, and that summer at the Garrick Theatre, New York, she played Little Willie in the burlesque Trilby by Joseph W. Hebert and Charles Puener.

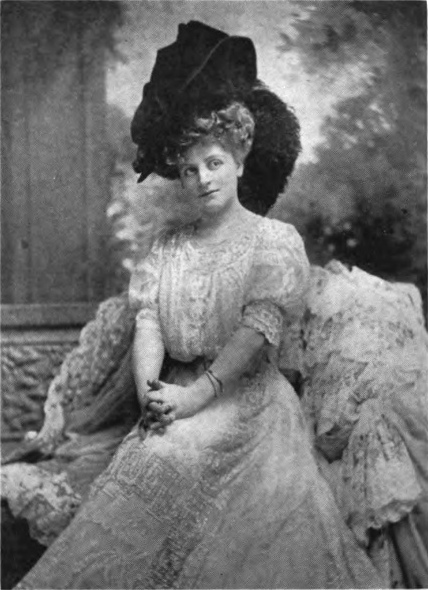
Adele Ritchie c. 1907

In 1896/97, Ritchie toured in the Reginald De Kovan and Harry B. Smith comic opera The Mandarin playing Ting-ling, favorite wife of the Mandarin and, at London’s Shaftesbury Theatre later in 1897, appeared as Cleopatra in the Victor Herbert and Harry B. Smith comic opera, The Wizard of the Nile; or, The Egyptian Beauty. By January 1898 Ritchie was reported to be in Paris studying under the Italian tenor Giovanni Sbriglia.

Ritchie made her vaudeville debut with tenor Don Giovanni Perugini (née John Haley Augustin Chatterton), the husband of Lillian Russell, early in April 1898 at Koster and Bial's Music Hall in an operetta by Alexandre Derolles entitled Au Bain. That November Ritchie assumed the role of Dorothy Stanley from Yvette Violette after Augustin Daly moved the Edwardian musical comedy A Runaway Girl to the Fifth Avenue Theatre. The musical, in which she sang, Oh Listen to the Band and I Love You, My Love, I Do, continued its long run well into February 1899. Ritchie was ranked 8 out of 12 among leading actresses whose companies had the highest gross receipts over the 30-week 1898/99 season.

On Christmas Day 1899, Ritchie played Beatrice Jerome in the R. A. Barnet musical comedy Three Little Lambs, at the Fifth Avenue Theatre, and would go on to appear in such Broadway musical productions as The Casino Girl at the Casino Theatre (1900) and in The Toreador as Dora Selby at the Knickerbocker Theatre, January–May 1902; A Chinese Honeymoon as Mrs. Pineapple at the Casino Theatre, June 1902–April 1903; Fantana, by John Raymond Hubbell, as Fanny Everett at the Lyric Theatre, January–September 1905; The Social Whirl, as Violet Dare at the Casino Theatre, April–September 1906; Fascinating Flora as Flora Duval at the Casino Theatre, May–September 1907; and All for the Ladies as Nancy Panturel at the Lyric Theatre, December 1912-April 1913. At this point in her career Ritchie returned to vaudeville billed as the Dresden China Prima Donna in skits and acts that often featured songs she had performed over her career.

== Personal life ==
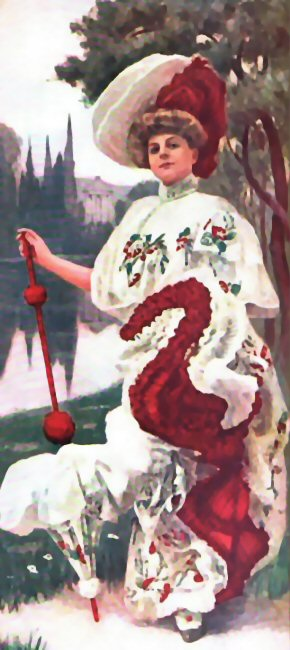
Adele Ritchie, c. 1904

On October 21, 1895, Ritchie married Joseph W. Herbert, a British-born comedian and playwright who at the time was touring with Lillian Russell. At the height of her career Ritchie maintained a country home with a horse barn in Westchester County, and a residence at 67 West Fifty-Seventh Street, New York. She enjoyed horseback riding, bicycling, autoing and competing in dog shows. Ritchie was awarded first prize as the most graceful and elegantly dressed rider of the 1896 Long Branch Bicycle Pageant, and her dog, Little Dot, accumulated the required points to win the 1908 American Kennel Club Yorkshire Terrier class at the seventh annual Wissahickon Kennel Dog Show. By June 1910, Ritchie's circumstances had diminished to the point she was compelled to file for bankruptcy with debts amounting over $16,000 and assets less than $300.

In December 1908, Ritchie arranged, largely through force of personality, the release of Alice Crowninshield Rogers from involuntary confinement at a Connecticut mental institution. Rogers, who Ritchie may have known socially, came from a wealthy family and was the ex-wife of Boston millionaire Thomas Pierce. Ritchie felt Rogers (most likely an alcoholic) had been abandoned by her friends and family. The two later took up residence at Ritchie’s farm near Pelham, New York. Rogers was once again confined, this time at Bellevue Hospital, in June 1910 after causing a disturbance at the Casino Theatre. The incident was later described by a doctor as an episode of “alcoholic hysteria". In August 1910, both women were arrested near a Pelham train station after Ritchie allegedly interfered with police officers attempting to give Rogers a minor traffic citation. In the end, all charges, save the traffic violation, were dropped.

Ritchie married at Stamford, Connecticut, on June 12, 1913, a day in advance of a planned Friday the 13th nuptial, Charles Nelson Bell, a New York wine importer and son of a prominent banker. This union ran into difficulties almost from the beginning with allegations of bigamy from Bell’s former wife, his father’s disapproval of Ritchie, credit woes for both and finally a dispute between Ritchie and her husband over an automobile. During this period Ritchie reportedly slapped a process server after receiving a summons on the steps of a New York City courthouse and was threatened with jail after missing several court dates.

She next married in Toronto on February 2, 1916, Guy Bates Post, a noted stage actor who later had a lengthy career in film. They divorced in 1929 after a nearly three-year separation.

== Murder-suicide at Laguna Beach ==
Toward the end of the 1920s, Ritchie became director of the amateur theatre group, Community Players, at Laguna Beach in Southern California. During this time she became friends with Doris Miller, a set designer at the Laguna Beach Playhouse. Miller, who was some 23 years Ritchie's junior, came from a prominent Waukegan, Illinois, family and was the former wife of Chicago dentist Dr. Clinton Foster Palmer. For a time the two were often seen together at social events involving the Laguna Beach artist colony, but this began to change when Ritchie was replaced as the group's director after clashes with some of the actors. Ritchie grew increasingly bitter over this, which only escalated after Miller received an invitation to a social event, and she did not.

The two women were observed arguing on the afternoon of April 24, 1930, and that evening their bodies were found in Miller's bungalow apartment by a friend returning a lost dog. Miller had been shot in the back, while Ritchie was shot in the mouth. From the evidence Ritchie apparently made a futile attempt to stem the flow of blood from Miller's wound before cleaning up at a bathroom sink and then ultimately taking her own life.

== See also ==
- List of homicides in California
- Clara Bloodgood
- Christine Norman
