= Burnap v. United States =

- Supreme Court of the United States

Argued March 12, 1920 Decided April 19, 1920
- Full case name: Burnap v. United States
- Citations: 252 U.S. 512 (more)

Holding
- Whether a person is an officer of the United States or a mere employee is determined by the manner in which Congress has provided by law for the creation of the position, its duties, and the method of appointment.

Court membership
- Chief Justice Edward D. White Associate Justices Joseph McKenna · Oliver W. Holmes Jr. William R. Day · Willis Van Devanter; Mahlon Pitney · James C. McReynolds; Louis Brandeis · John H. Clarke

Case opinion
- Majority: Brandeis, joined by unanimous

Laws applied
- U.S. Const. art. II, § 2, cl. 2

Burnap v. United States, 252 U.S. 512 (1920), was a decision of the United States Supreme Court concerning the Appointments Clause.

== Background ==
Charles A. Burnap was appointed in 1910 as a landscape architect in the Office of Public Buildings and Grounds, an agency within the War Department. In 1915, he was suspended without pay pending charges, and in 1916 he was formally discharged "to promote the efficiency of the service." His successor was not appointed until 1917. Burnap sued for back pay, arguing that his removal was illegal and therefore void. His claim rested on two main points:

1. He was appointed by the Secretary of War, and therefore must be removed by the Secretary by appointment of a successor.
2. He was entitled to his salary until a successor was named.

== Decision ==
Under Article 2 of the United States Constitution, Congress may vest the appointment of inferior officers in department heads like the Secretary of War. In a line of precedent the Supreme Court had found that the power to remove an officer is an incident of the power to appoint. The Court concludes that the power to suspend is similar.

The Office of Public Buildings and Grounds has a long history, with its duties evolving through several statutes. By the early 1900s, the Chief of Engineers of the U.S. Army was assigned charge of these public buildings and grounds, operating under regulations prescribed by the President through the War Department. The Chief of Engineers reported to the Secretary of War.

The only legal basis for employing a landscape architect in that office came from annual appropriation acts passed by Congress. For example, the Act of June 17, 1910 (and subsequent similar acts) allocated funds and authorized employment "for the following additional employees under the Office of Public Buildings and Grounds," including a landscape architect. Therefore, Burnap's position was created and funded not by a permanent, substantive statute, but through temporary appropriations legislation. There was no separate statute that created an "Office of Landscape Architect" or defined its duties. The position was not established by a specific act of Congress.

The Court acknowledged that, under the broad language of Section 169 of the Revised Statutes, the Secretary of War would have the authority to appoint an employee like a landscape architect within his department, which included the bureau of the Chief of Engineers. However, Section 1799 of the Revised Statutes explicitly authorized the Chief of Engineers to employ persons for the Office of Public Buildings and Grounds. The Court applied the rule that a specific statute overrides a general one to affirm the judgment of the court below.
