= The Return of Sherlock Holmes (1929 film) =

1929 film

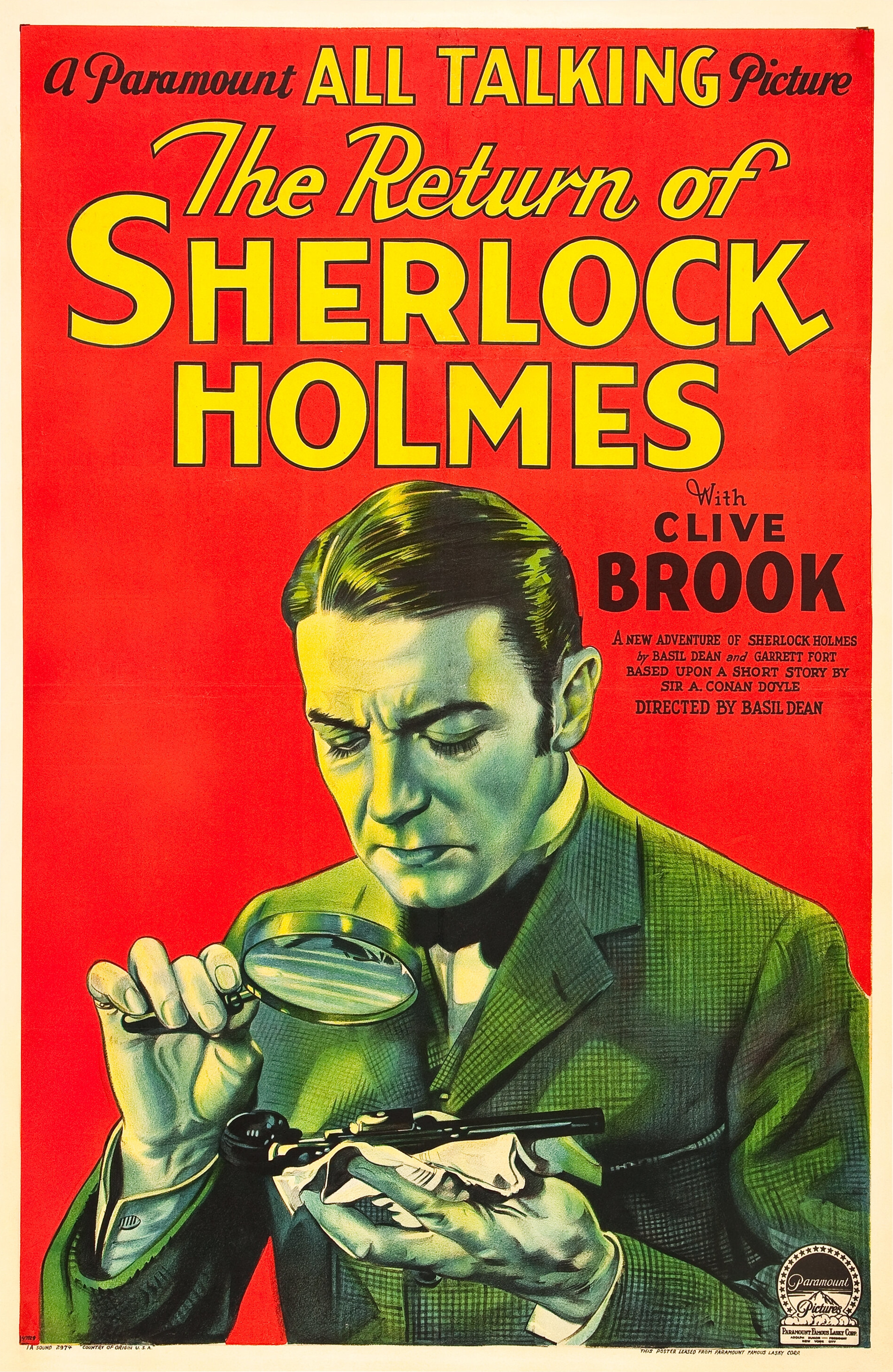
- Theatrical release poster
- Directed by: Basil Dean
- Written by: Arthur Conan Doyle; Basil Dean; Garrett Fort
- Produced by: Basil Dean
- Starring: Clive Brook; H. Reeves-Smith; Betty Lawford; Charles Hay; Phillips Holmes
- Cinematography: William O. Steiner
- Edited by: Helene Turner
- Production company: Paramount Pictures
- Distributed by: Paramount Pictures
- Release date: October 29, 1929
- Running time: 71 minutes
- Country: United States
- Language: English

The Return of Sherlock Holmes is a 1929 American Pre-Code mystery film directed by Basil Dean and written by Arthur Conan Doyle, Basil Dean and Garrett Fort. The film shares its title with the third volume of the Sherlock Holmes stories, The Return of Sherlock Holmes by Arthur Conan Doyle. The film stars Clive Brook, H. Reeves-Smith, Betty Lawford, Charles Hay and Phillips Holmes. The film was released October 29, 1929, by Paramount Pictures. A copy is held at the Library of Congress. It was the first sound film to feature Sherlock Holmes. In 2025, the film entered the public domain in the United States.

== Plot ==
Sherlock Holmes dons several disguises to find information, after a retired captain, repenting of having worked with arch criminal Moriarty, is killed.

== Cast ==
- Clive Brook as Sherlock Holmes
- H. Reeves-Smith as Dr. Watson
- Betty Lawford as Mary Watson
- Charles Hay as Captain Longmore
- Phillips Holmes as Roger Longmore
- Donald Crisp as Colonel Moran
- Harry T. Morey as Professor Moriarty
- Hubert Druce as Sergeant Gripper

== Production ==
The Return of Sherlock Holmes was shot at the Astoria Studios in New York. A silent version of the film was also produced to accommodate theaters which did not feature sound.

== See also ==
- List of early sound feature films (1926–1929)
