= Peg o' My Heart (play) =

1912 play by J. Hartley Manners

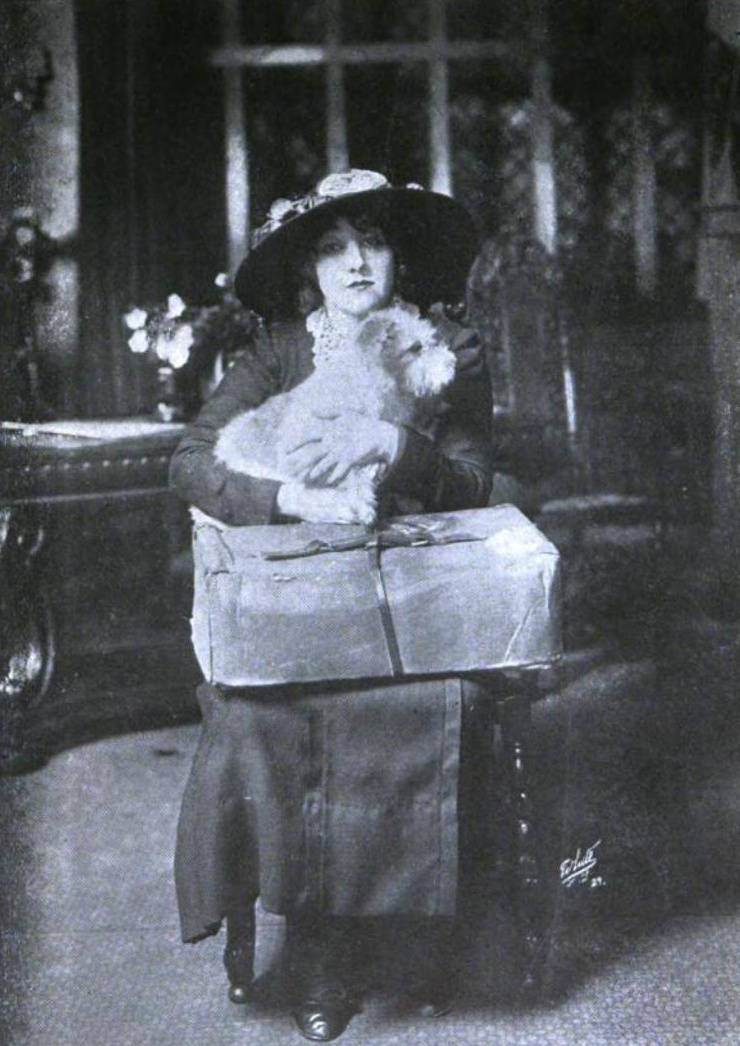
- Laurette Taylor in Peg o' My Heart
- Original language: English
- Written by: J. Hartley Manners
- Subject: Satire of Irish-American sentimentality
- Genre: Comedy
- Setting: Drawing room of Regal Villa in Scarborough

Premiere
- Date: December 20, 1912
- Place: Cort Theatre
- Directed by: J. Hartley Manners

Peg o' My Heart is a 1912 play written by J. Hartley Manners. It has three acts, a medium-sized cast, one setting, and moderate pacing. The story is set at the English mansion of the socially prominent Chichester family, whose lives are changed by the introduction of an Irish-American heiress into their midst.

It was first produced by Oliver Morosco and staged by the playwright. The massive single setting was designed by Robert Brunton. The play starred Laurette Taylor, who had recently signed a three-year contract with Morosco. It opened in Los Angeles during May 1912, where it ran for eleven weeks. Its Broadway premiere came in December 1912. It was a huge success there, playing over 600 times through May 1914, establishing new records "for longest consecutive run of any comedy in New York City" and continuous performances by a female star. Critical reviews on both coasts emphasized the importance of Taylor's performance over the content of the play.

Morosco had announced a prize to write a song for the play in March 1912; a year later the winner Peg o' My Heart was released, also to popular success. Manners published his play, but he also published a novel expanding and encompassing the comedy with background and future events. The play had a moderately successful Broadway revival from February through April 1921, and was the basis for a 1922 silent film and a 1933 musical.

== Characters ==
Characters are listed in order of appearance within their scope, and as defined in 1912 cast lists. Differences with the published play are in footnotes.

Lead

- Margaret O'Connell called Peg, is 18, the pretty American-born daughter of an Irish immigrant and his English wife.
- Sir Gerald Adair called Jerry, is a wealthy young lawyer, Peg's only friend in England; she is unaware of his title.

Supporting

- Mrs. Chichester addressed by her son as "Mater" but named Monica; she is a narrow-minded, self-absorbed widow.
- Ethel is Mrs. Chichester's daughter; she is intelligent, frank, proud, bored and horrified at accepting charity.
- Alaric is Mrs. Chichester's son, a friend of Jerry; not a bad sort and well-educated, but weak-minded and indolent.

Featured

- Christian Brent is a young married man; a long-winded cad who wants to seduce Ethel and Peg.
- Montgomery Hawkes is a middle-aged barrister who informs the Chichester family about Nathaniel's will.
- Footman is a servant in Mrs. Chichester's household. (Note: The published play has this character as "Jarvis" and calls him a butler.)
- Maid is the maid in Mrs. Chichester's household. (Note: The published play has this character as "Bennett".)

Canine

- Michael is Peg's terrier mutt, her constant companion, whom she has smuggled into England.
- Pet is Ethel's female French poodle, a dainty creature unable to deal with Michael.

Off stage

- Nathaniel Kingsworth is Mrs. Chichester's recently deceased brother, who leaves a will favoring his niece Peg.
- Angelia O'Connell long dead, was Peg's mother, sister to both Nathaniel and Mrs. Chichester.
- Frank O'Connell is Peg's father and widower of Angelia, hopeless with money. Peg admires and speaks of him often.

== Synopsis ==
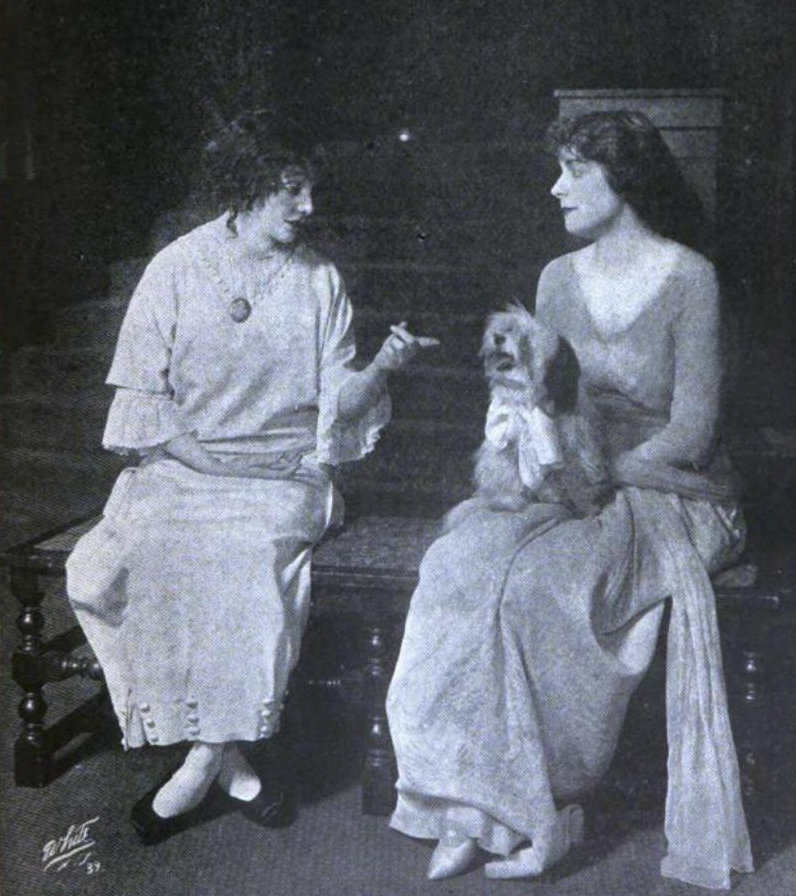

Act I (Drawing room of Regal Villa, the Chichester mansion in Scarborough, on June 1st.) The Chichester family learns their bank has closed its doors. Brent comes to pester Ethel. Peggy, just arrived from New York, enters unannounced, and refuses to explain herself. Exasperated, Ethel sends her to the servants' quarters, while Alaric sees off Brent. Mr. Hawkes explains the curious will of Nathaniel Kingsworth to the Chichesters. They will have £1000 per annum if they agree to teach Peg refinement. Peg is not to know the conditions of the will, but if she refuses to stay or her character is found wanting, the Chichesters get nothing. Peg is fetched back from the servants' quarters to appall her relatives with her outspoken ways, dowdy clothes, and weatherbeaten mutt. Mr. Hawkes gets all parties to agree on a one-month trial. Ordered to her new room, Peg defies the maid only to find the house empty. A summer storm begins, and Peg is frightened by Jerry coming in through the French windows from the garden. Jerry soothes Peg's apprehensions and explains he knows who she is; he was Nathaniel's friend. The Chichesters return, surprised to find Jerry with her. They all go in to lunch together, Peg defying Mrs. Chichester's order to eat in her room. (Curtain)

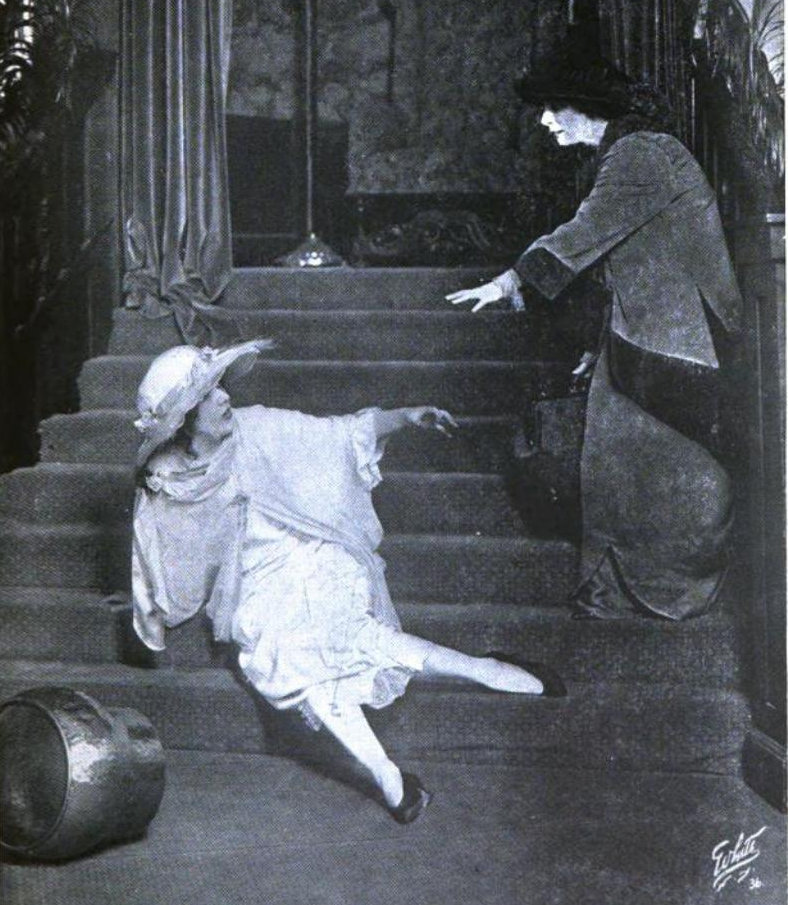

Act II (Same, a month later.) Brent sneaks up on Peg while she's reading a book from Jerry. He pesters, grabs and embraces her, then gets slapped in the face. Ethel enters as Peg runs out, and Brent pivots smoothly to another target. Ethel agrees to elope with Brent that night. Peg returns after Brent leaves, and Jerry joins the two girls. He invites them to a dance. Ethel declines, Peg accepts. When Ethel goes to fetch her mother at Peg's insistence, Jerry and Peg discuss her situation. He convinces her to stay another month. Peg admits they are friends now, and maybe more... However, Mrs. Chichester forbids her to go to the dance. Peg does get her permission to stay up late to study. Everyone has gone to bed, when Peg quietly gets her hat and coat to go out with Jerry. But Ethel also creeps quietly down the stairs with her own coat and travel bag. Peg forcibly stops Ethel, telling her a life of misery awaits her with Brent. Ethel breaks down, confessing her misery at living on Peg's charity. Peg is baffled; she knows nothing of the will. When Peg trips and knocks over an urn, the sudden noise awakens the household. Peg tells Ethel to follow her lead. She convinces Mrs. Chichester that Ethel just caught her, Peg, trying to sneak out to the dance. Mrs. Chicester excortiates Peg for her disobedience. Peg says she will leave in the morning, but Ethel faints. Peg scolds Mrs. Chichester for not caring about her daughter, while tending to Ethel. (Curtain)

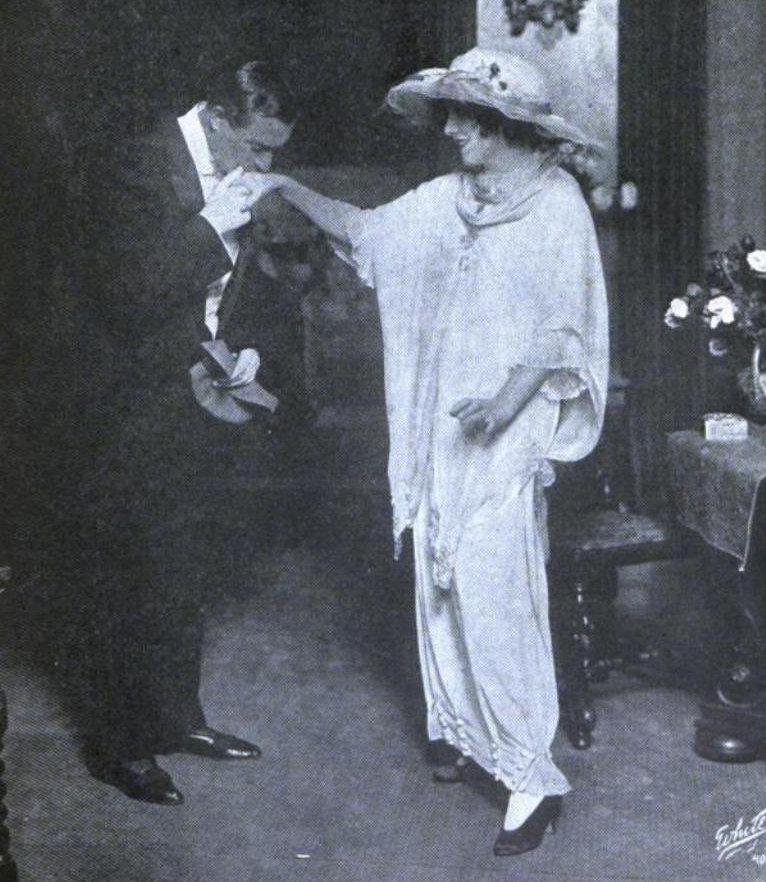

Act III (Same, the next morning.) Ethel convinces her mother to reconsider Peg's departure, since it will leave the family insolvent. Mrs. Chichester approaches Alaric with the suggestion he propose to Peg to keep her at Regal Villa. He reluctantly agrees, but is relieved when Peg laughs, and thanks her for rejecting him. Next Mr. Hawkes arrives; he too proposes to Peg, but adds the curious condition that the engagement should last until she turns 21. She refuses his offer and insists on departing for New York. But now Jerry arrives, and Peg learns he is Sir Gerald, co-executor of her uncle's will. He explains that far from being a guest of the Chichesters, she is actually subsidizing them. Also, if she obeys the will, she will receive £5000 annually at age 21. He then informs the family that their bank has reopened and their capital is secure, so Peg's sinecure is no longer needed. Despite this, Ethel and Alaric urge Peg to stay, while Mrs. Chichester ignores her. However, Peg is determined to see her father again, and so rejects the inheritance. Jerry proposes to her and is accepted, with the understanding he will have to follow her to New York. (Curtain)

== Original production ==
=== Background ===
The play was written in 1911, while the first public mention came in January 1912, when The Los Angeles Times noted Morosco had secured it for early local production by his Burbank Theatre stock company. By March 1912 it was known that Laurette Taylor would star and that it had been written especially for her by Manners.

Taylor was then performing in another Morosco production, The Bird of Paradise, at Maxine Elliott's Theatre on Broadway. The play was closed on April 13, 1912, so she could be freed up for Peg o' My Heart. Her leading man was to be Henry Stanford, brought out to Los Angeles from Broadway, where he had been playing in a revival of Monsieur Beaucaire with Lewis Waller.

=== Cast ===
Principal cast for the Los Angeles and Broadway runs. The production was on hiatus from August 4 through December 19, 1912.
Role	Actor	Dates	Notes and sources
Peg	Laurette Taylor	May 26, 1912 - May 30, 1914	Taylor did not miss a single performance for the Broadway run.
Jerry	Henry Stanford	May 26, 1912 - Aug 03, 1912	
Jerry	H. Reeves-Smith	Dec 20, 1912 - May 30, 1914	
Mrs. Chichester	Emelie Melville	May 26, 1912 - May 30, 1914	Melville was the only other player besides Taylor to last through the entire LA and NY runs.
Ethel	Roberta Arnold	May 26, 1912 - Aug 03, 1912	
Ethel	Christine Norman	Dec 20, 1912 - Jul 2?, 1913	Norman had to leave the production suddenly because of illness.
Ethel	Ruth Gartland	Jul 2?, 1913 - Aug 9, 1913	Gartland took over when Norman first fell ill, then was given the part in the road company.
Ethel	Violet Kemble-Cooper	Aug 11, 1913 - May 30, 1914	
Alaric	Donald Bowles	May 26, 1912 - Aug 03, 1912	
Alaric	Hassard Short	Dec 20, 1912 - May 30, 1914	
Christian Brent	Edward Fielding	May 26, 1912 - Aug 03, 1912	
Christian Brent	Reginald Mason	Dec 20, 1912 - May 30, 1914	
Montgomery Hawkes	James Corrigan	May 26, 1912 - Aug 03, 1912	
Montgomery Hawkes	Clarence Handyside	Dec 20, 1912 - May 30, 1914	
Footman	Robert Leonard	May 26, 1912 - Aug 03, 1912	
Footman	Peter Bassett	Dec 20, 1912 - May 30, 1914	
Maid	Lola May	May 26, 1912 - Aug 03, 1912	
Maid	Ruth Gartland	Dec 20, 1912 - Jul 2?, 1913	
Maid	Yvonne Jarrette	Jul 2?, 1913 - May 30, 1914	

=== Los Angeles opening ===
Peg o' My Heart had its first public performance as a Sunday matinee at Morosco's Burbank Theatre (Note: Despite the name, this was located near Sixth and Main streets in downtown Los Angeles.) on May 26, 1912. Morosco had a stock company at the theatre, who filled some parts, with others drawn from Belasco players in town. Reviewers agreed on two things: that Taylor's performance outshone the play, and that Donald Bowles was mistakenly playing Alaric as a simpleton. Julian Johnson of The Los Angeles Times said: "The feature of the whole thing is Laurette Taylor as 'Peg'. Peg a la Taylor is bigger than the play surrounding her", and he called her "one of the subtlest comediennes on our stage today". He also revealed that the audience was not quite up to some of the lines: "Much of the satire of Peg o' My Heart is so delicate that daylight kills it. Which accounts for many firecracker lines passing noiselessly over the heads at yesterday's matinee".

Originally scheduled for an eight-week run, the production was still attracting standing-room only crowds at eleven weeks when forced to close on August 3, 1912, to make way for Richard Bennett in The Deep Purple. The string of 101 consecutive performances set a record for the Burbank Theatre.

=== Broadway premiere ===
The Broadway premiere for Peg o' My Heart had long been scheduled as the inaugural work for the new Cort Theatre. However, construction took longer than anticipated, so the premiere was slipped until December 1912. Laurette Taylor and J. Hartley Manners confirmed their engagement on November 2, 1912, but said the wedding would have to wait until after the Christmas holidays as they were too busy with play preparations.

Peg o' My Heart premiered at the Cort Theatre on December 20, 1912, with only Emelie Melville (Mrs. Chichester) carried over from the Los Angeles cast. Reviewers devoted some of their space to the aesthetics of the newly opened theatre, but their general conclusions mirrored the earlier critics, that the play was all Taylor. The reviewer for The Brooklyn Daily Eagle said the other characters were impossible due to the writing. The New-York Tribune reported: "After the second act Peg was forced by determined applause to make a speech, and Peg - not Laurette Taylor - responded. For once the curtain speech was a success...". And the critic for The New York Times said "...it will be impossible to imagine 'Peg' without Miss Taylor, or for a long time to come, Miss Taylor without 'Peg'... The others do not matter, with the exception of Mr. H. Reeves-Smith, who does mostly nothing, but does it splendidly. In fact, when Miss Taylor is off the stage the curtain might as well be down".

=== Broadway closing ===
The play closed on Saturday, May 30, 1914, having been performed 604 times, a then record for a comedy. Laurette Taylor was hailed by The New York Times for having never missed a single performance, which it called "a world's record for a female star". Among other statistics compiled and cited by the newspaper were $788,340 in gross receipts (Note: Worth over $25 million in 2024.) and a viewing audience of 524,272. Another newspaper pointed out that the 604 number was "exclusive of special performances" for benefits and one private performance given at the request of Sarah Bernhardt.

== Revival ==
Peg o' My Heart was given a revival by producer Abe Erlanger at the Cort Theatre starting February 14, 1921. Laurette Taylor reprised her starring role, but with a different supporting cast. It ran through April 29, 1921, for 88 performances.

== Adaptations ==
=== Music ===
During March 1912, two months before Peg o' My Heart opened, Morosco announced a $1000 prize for a song to complement the new play. He renewed the offer a year later, with the judging to be done by Laurette Taylor, J. Huntly Manners, and George Mooser.

=== Literature ===
Manners first adapted his play to short story form in March 1913 for the magazine of The Sunday World. In October 1913 he published a novel based on it, comprising the play, background events, and subsequent happenings. The novel was organized into five "books", of which only the fourth covered events from the play, albeit greatly expanded and with changes. The novel introduced new characters and additional plotlines. There were two editions of the novel: a special "Laurette Taylor" edition with a page devoted to the history of the production (at the time still going on Broadway), and a mass edition published by Grossett & Dunlop. Both editions were copyrighted by Dodd, Mead & Company.

=== Film ===
- Peg o' My Heart (1922 film)
- Peg o' My Heart (1933 film)

== Bibliography ==
- J. Hartley Manners. Peg o' My Heart: A Comedy of Youth. Dodd, Mead & Company, New York, October 1913. - "The Laurette Taylor Edition" of the novel.
- J. Hartley Manners. Peg o' My Heart: A Comedy of Youth. Grosset & Dunlap, New York, October 1913. - Mass edition of the novel.
