= List of United States Supreme Court cases, volume 252 =

Supreme Court of the United States
- Interactive map of Supreme Court of the United States
- 38°53′26″N 77°00′16″W
- Established: March 4, 1789; 236 years ago
- Location: Washington, D.C.
- Coordinates: 38°53′26″N 77°00′16″W
- Composition method: Presidential nomination with Senate confirmation
- Authorised by: Constitution of the United States, Art. III, § 1
- Judge term length: life tenure, subject to impeachment and removal
- Number of positions: 9 (by statute)
- Website: supremecourt.gov

This is a list of cases reported in volume 252 of United States Reports, decided by the Supreme Court of the United States in 1920.

== Justices of the Supreme Court at the time of volume 252 U.S. ==
The Supreme Court is established by Article III, Section 1 of the Constitution of the United States, which says: "The judicial Power of the United States, shall be vested in one supreme Court . . .". The size of the Court is not specified; the Constitution leaves it to Congress to set the number of justices. Under the Judiciary Act of 1789 Congress originally fixed the number of justices at six (one chief justice and five associate justices). Since 1789 Congress has varied the size of the Court from six to seven, nine, ten, and back to nine justices (always including one chief justice).

When the cases in volume 252 were decided the Court comprised the following nine members:

Portrait	Justice	Office	Home State	Succeeded	Date confirmed by the Senate (Vote)	Tenure on Supreme Court
	Edward Douglass White	Chief Justice	Louisiana	Melville Fuller	December 12, 1910 (Acclamation)	December 19, 1910 – May 19, 1921 (Died)
	Joseph McKenna	Associate Justice	California	Stephen Johnson Field	January 21, 1898 (Acclamation)	January 26, 1898 – January 5, 1925 (Retired)
	Oliver Wendell Holmes Jr.	Associate Justice	Massachusetts	Horace Gray	December 4, 1902 (Acclamation)	December 8, 1902 – January 12, 1932 (Retired)
	William R. Day	Associate Justice	Ohio	George Shiras Jr.	February 23, 1903 (Acclamation)	March 2, 1903 – November 13, 1922 (Retired)
	Willis Van Devanter	Associate Justice	Wyoming	Edward Douglass White (as Associate Justice)	December 15, 1910 (Acclamation)	January 3, 1911 – June 2, 1937 (Retired)
	Mahlon Pitney	Associate Justice	New Jersey	John Marshall Harlan	March 13, 1912 (50–26)	March 18, 1912 – December 31, 1922 (Resigned)
	James Clark McReynolds	Associate Justice	Tennessee	Horace Harmon Lurton	August 29, 1914 (44–6)	October 12, 1914 – January 31, 1941 (Retired)
	Louis Brandeis	Associate Justice	Massachusetts	Joseph Rucker Lamar	June 1, 1916 (47–22)	June 5, 1916 – February 13, 1939 (Retired)
	John Hessin Clarke	Associate Justice	Ohio	Charles Evans Hughes	July 24, 1916 (Acclamation)	October 9, 1916 – September 18, 1922 (Retired)

== Notable Case in 252 U.S. ==
=== Missouri v. Holland ===
In Missouri v. Holland, 252 U.S. 416 (1920), the Supreme Court considered the extent to which international legal obligations are incorporated into federal law. The case centered on the constitutionality of the Migratory Bird Treaty Act of 1918, which prohibited the killing, capturing, and selling of certain migratory birds pursuant to an earlier treaty between the U.S. and the United Kingdom. The state of Missouri challenged enforcement of the Act within its jurisdiction, arguing that the regulation of game was not expressly delegated by the U.S. Constitution to the federal government, and was therefore reserved for the states under the Tenth Amendment. The Court upheld the Act as a valid exercise of the federal government's treaty power, with the supremacy clause of the Constitution elevating treaties above state law.

== Citation style ==
Under the Judiciary Act of 1789 the federal court structure at the time comprised District Courts, which had general trial jurisdiction; Circuit Courts, which had mixed trial and appellate (from the US District Courts) jurisdiction; and the United States Supreme Court, which had appellate jurisdiction over the federal District and Circuit courts—and for certain issues over state courts. The Supreme Court also had limited original jurisdiction (i.e., in which cases could be filed directly with the Supreme Court without first having been heard by a lower federal or state court). There were one or more federal District Courts and/or Circuit Courts in each state, territory, or other geographical region.

The Judiciary Act of 1891 created the United States Courts of Appeals and reassigned the jurisdiction of most routine appeals from the district and circuit courts to these appellate courts. The Act created nine new courts that were originally known as the "United States Circuit Courts of Appeals." The new courts had jurisdiction over most appeals of lower court decisions. The Supreme Court could review either legal issues that a court of appeals certified or decisions of court of appeals by writ of certiorari. On January 1, 1912, the effective date of the Judicial Code of 1911, the old Circuit Courts were abolished, with their remaining trial court jurisdiction transferred to the U.S. District Courts.

Bluebook citation style is used for case names, citations, and jurisdictions.

- "# Cir." = United States Court of Appeals
  - e.g., "3d Cir." = United States Court of Appeals for the Third Circuit
- "D." = United States District Court for the District of . . .
  - e.g.,"D. Mass." = United States District Court for the District of Massachusetts
- "E." = Eastern; "M." = Middle; "N." = Northern; "S." = Southern; "W." = Western
  - e.g.,"M.D. Ala." = United States District Court for the Middle District of Alabama
- "Ct. Cl." = United States Court of Claims
- The abbreviation of a state's name alone indicates the highest appellate court in that state's judiciary at the time.
  - e.g.,"Pa." = Supreme Court of Pennsylvania
  - e.g.,"Me." = Supreme Judicial Court of Maine

== List of cases in volume 252 U.S. ==
Case Name	Page and year	Opinion of the Court	Concurring opinion(s)	Dissenting opinion(s)	Lower Court	Disposition
Jett Brothers Distilling Company v. Carrollton	1 (1920)	Day	none	none	Ky.	dismissed
Farncomb v. City and County of Denver	7 (1920)	Day	none	none	Colo.	affirmed
Goldsmith v. George G. Prendergast Construction Company	12 (1920)	Day	none	none	Mo.	affirmed
Chicago, Rock Island and Pacific Railroad Company v. Ward	18 (1920)	Day	none	none	Okla.	affirmed
Pennsylvania Gas Company v. Public Service Commission of New York	23 (1920)	Day	none	none	N.Y. Sup. Ct.	affirmed
Ex parte Tiffany	32 (1920)	Day	none	none	D.N.J.	mandamus denied
Shaffer v. Carter	37 (1920)	Pitney	none	none	E.D. Okla.	multiple
Travis v. Yale and Towne Manufacturing Company	60 (1920)	Pitney	none	none	S.D.N.Y.	affirmed
Chesbrough v. Northern Trust Company	83 (1920)	McReynolds	none	none	6th Cir.	affirmed
United States v. A. Schrader's Son, Inc.	85 (1920)	McReynolds	none	none	N.D. Ohio	reversed
Milwaukee Electric Railway and Light Company v. Wisconsin ex rel. City of Milwaukee	100 (1920)	Brandeis	none	none	Wis.	affirmed
McCloskey v. Tobin	107 (1920)	Brandeis	none	none	Tex. Crim. App.	affirmed
Lee v. Central of Georgia Railroad Company	109 (1920)	Brandeis	none	none	Ga. Ct. App.	affirmed
Grand Trunk Western Railroad Company v. United States	112 (1920)	Brandeis	none	none	Ct. Cl.	affirmed
Chapman v. Wintroath	126 (1920)	Clarke	none	none	D.C. Cir.	reversed
National Lead Company v. United States	140 (1920)	Clarke	none	none	Ct. Cl.	affirmed
Kansas City Southern Railway Company v. United States	147 (1920)	Clarke	none	none	Ct. Cl.	affirmed
New York Central Railroad Company v. Mohney	152 (1920)	Clarke	none	none	Ohio Dist. Ct. App.	affirmed
Ash Sheep Company v. United States	159 (1920)	Clarke	none	none	9th Cir.	affirmed
Gayon v. McCarthy	171 (1920)	Clarke	none	none	S.D.N.Y.	affirmed
United States ex rel. Kansas City Southern Railway Company v. Interstate Commerce Commission	178 (1920)	White	none	none	D.C. Cir.	reversed
Eisner v. Macomber	189 (1920)	Pitney	none	Holmes; Brandeis	S.D.N.Y.	affirmed
Pierce v. United States	239 (1920)	Pitney	none	Brandeis	N.D.N.Y.	affirmed
Minnesota v. Wisconsin	273 (1920)	McReynolds	none	none	original	state boundary set
Cole v. Ralph	286 (1920)	VanDevanter	none	none	9th Cir.	reversed
Panama Railroad Company v. Toppin	308 (1920)	Brandeis	none	none	5th Cir.	affirmed
The Atlanten	313 (1920)	Holmes	none	none	2d Cir.	affirmed
Manners v. Morosco	317 (1920)	Holmes	none	Clarke	2d Cir.	reversed
Oklahoma Operating Company v. Love	331 (1920)	Brandeis	none	none	W.D. Okla.	reversed
Oklahoma Gin Company v. Oklahoma	339 (1920)	Brandeis	none	none	Okla.	reversed
Hiawassee River Power Company v. Carolina-Tennessee Power Company	341 (1920)	Brandeis	none	none	N.C.	dismissed
Strathearn Steamship Company, Ltd. v. Dillon	348 (1920)	Day	none	none	5th Cir.	affirmed
Thompson v. Lucas	358 (1920)	Day	none	none	2d Cir.	affirmed
Collins v. Miller	364 (1920)	Brandeis	none	none	E.D. La.	dismissed
Caldwell v. Parker	376 (1920)	White	none	none	N.D. Ala.	affirmed
Cuyahoga River Power Company v. Northern Ohio Traction and Light Company	388 (1920)	McKenna	none	none	N.D. Ohio	affirmed
South Covington and Cincinnati Street Railway Company v. Kentucky	399 (1920)	McKenna	none	Day	Ky.	affirmed
Cincinnati, Covington and Erlanger Railway Company v. Kentucky	408 (1920)	McKenna	none	Day	Ky.	affirmed
Kenney v. Supreme Lodge of the World, Loyal Order of Moose	411 (1920)	Holmes	none	none	Ill.	reversed
Missouri v. Holland	416 (1920)	Holmes	none	none	W.D. Mo.	affirmed
Blumenstock Brothers Advertising Agency v. Curtis Publishing Company	436 (1920)	Day	none	none	N.D. Ill.	affirmed
Askren v. Continental Oil Company	444 (1920)	Day	none	none	D.N.M.	affirmed
Cameron v. United States	450 (1920)	VanDevanter	none	none	9th Cir.	affirmed
United States v. Simpson	465 (1920)	VanDevanter	none	Clarke	D. Colo.	reversed
Houston v. Ormes	469 (1920)	Pitney	none	none	D.C. Cir.	affirmed
Hull v. Philadelphia and Reading Railroad Company	475 (1920)	Pitney	none	Clarke	Md.	affirmed
United States v. Chase National Bank	485 (1920)	McReynolds	none	none	2d Cir.	affirmed
Boehmer v. Pennsylvania Railroad Company	496 (1920)	McReynolds	none	none	2d Cir.	affirmed
Munday v. Wisconsin Trust Company	499 (1920)	McReynolds	none	none	Wis.	affirmed
First National Bank v. Williams	504 (1920)	McReynolds	none	none	M.D. Pa.	reversed
Burnap v. United States	512 (1920)	Brandeis	none	none	Ct. Cl.	affirmed
Oneida Navigation Corporation v. Job and Company, Inc.	521 (1920)	Brandeis	none	none	S.D.N.Y.	dismissed
Penn Mutual Life Insurance Company v. Lederer	523 (1920)	Brandeis	none	none	3d Cir.	affirmed
Estate of P.D. Beckwith, Inc. v. Commissioner of Patents	538 (1920)	Clarke	none	none	D.C. Cir.	reversed
Simpson v. United States	547 (1920)	Clarke	none	none	Ct. Cl.	affirmed
Canadian National Railway Company v. Eggen	553 (1920)	Clarke	none	none	8th Cir.	reversed
