= Missouri v. Holland =

- Supreme Court of the United States

Argued March 2, 1920 Decided April 19, 1920
- Full case name: State of Missouri v. Holland, United States Game Warden
- Citations: 252 U.S. 416 (more) 40 S. Ct. 382; 64 L. Ed. 641; 1920 U.S. LEXIS 1520; 11 A.L.R. 984; 18 Ohio L. Rep. 61

Case history
- Prior: United States v. Samples, 258 F. 479 (W.D. Mo. 1919)

Holding
- Protection of a State's quasi-sovereign right to regulate the taking of game is an insufficient jurisdictional basis, apart from any pecuniary interest, for a bill by a State to enjoin enforcement of federal regulations over the subject alleged to be unconstitutional. Treaties made by the federal government are supreme over any state concerns about such treaties having abrogated any states' rights arising under the Tenth Amendment. The Migratory Bird Treaty Act of 1918 is constitutional.

Court membership
- Chief Justice Edward D. White Associate Justices Joseph McKenna · Oliver W. Holmes Jr. William R. Day · Willis Van Devanter; Mahlon Pitney · James C. McReynolds; Louis Brandeis · John H. Clarke

Case opinions
- Majority: Holmes, joined by White, McKenna, Day, McReynolds, Brandeis, Clarke
- Dissent: Van Devanter, Pitney

Laws applied
- U.S. Const. amend. X

Missouri v. Holland, 252 U.S. 416 (1920) is a United States Supreme Court case concerning the extent to which international legal obligations are incorporated into federal law under the United States Constitution.

The case centered on the constitutionality of the Migratory Bird Treaty Act of 1918, which prohibited the killing, capturing, and selling of certain migratory birds pursuant to a treaty between the United States and the United Kingdom. The state of Missouri challenged the enforcement of the Act within its jurisdiction, arguing that the regulation of game was not expressly delegated to the federal government by the United States Constitution and therefore was reserved for the states under the Tenth Amendment; accordingly, the United States government had no constitutional right to enter into a treaty concerning game regulation.

In a 7–2 decision, the Court upheld the Act as constitutional, since it was enacted pursuant to the federal government's express power to make treaties and to enact laws pursuant to treaties, which the Supremacy Clause of the Constitution elevates above state law. The Court also reasoned that protecting wildlife was in the national interest and could only be accomplished through federal action.

Missouri is also notable for Justice Oliver Wendell Holmes's articulation of the legal theory of a "living constitution", which purports that the Constitution changes over time and adapts to new circumstances without formal amendments.

== Facts ==
Congress had previously passed laws regulating the hunting of migratory waterfowl on the basis that such birds naturally migrated across state and international borders freely, and hence the regulation of the harvest of such birds could not realistically be considered to be province solely of individual states or groups of states. However, several states objected to this theory, and twice successfully sued to have such laws declared unconstitutional, on the premise that the U.S. Constitution gave Congress no enumerated power to regulate migratory bird hunting, thereby leaving the matter to states pursuant to the Tenth Amendment.

Disgruntled with these rulings, Congress then empowered the State Department to negotiate with the United Kingdom—which at the time still largely handled the foreign relations of Canada—a treaty pertaining to this issue. The treaty was subsequently ratified and came into force, requiring the federal government to enact laws regulating the capturing, killing, or selling of protected migratory birds, an obligation that it fulfilled in the Migratory Bird Treaty Act of 1918.

The state of Missouri requested that U.S. Game Warden Ray Holland be enjoined from implementing the Act, arguing that it was "an unconstitutional interference with the rights reserved to the States by the Tenth Amendment, and [...] the acts of the defendant [...] invade the sovereign right of the State and contravene its will manifested in statutes." Additionally, Missouri claimed that states had an "absolute" right to regulate game within their borders as recognized by "ancient law, feudal law, and the common law in England" as an "attribute of government and a necessary incident of sovereignty." The state also warned that permitting the federal government to regulate birds could set a dangerous precedent for government to broaden its power over other domains for which it had no enumerated constitutional power.

== Judgment ==
In an opinion authored by Justice Holmes, the Supreme Court dismissed Missouri's demand for an injunction against the federal government, holding that protection of a state's quasi-sovereign right to regulate game is insufficient jurisdictional basis to enjoin enforcement of the laws at issue.

The Supreme Court ruled the Migratory Bird Treaty Act constitutional, relying primarily on article VI, clause 2, sometimes known as the "Supremacy Clause", which establishes that treaties are the "supreme law of the land" and supersede state law accordingly. The ruling implied that treaty provisions were not subject to questioning by the states under the process of judicial review.

In the course of his judgment, Justice Holmes remarked on the nature of the Constitution as an "organism" that must be interpreted in contemporaneous terms:

With regard to that we may add that when we are dealing with words that also are a constituent act, like the Constitution of the United States, we must realize that they have called into life a being the development of which could not have been foreseen completely by the most gifted of its begetters. It was enough for them to realize or to hope that they had created an organism; it has taken a century and has cost their successors much sweat and blood to prove that they created a nation. The case before us must be considered in the light of our whole experience and not merely in that of what was said a hundred years ago. The treaty in question does not contravene any prohibitory words to be found in the Constitution. The only question is whether it is forbidden by some invisible radiation from the general terms of the Tenth Amendment. We must consider what this country has become in deciding what that amendment has reserved.

Justice Willis Van Devanter and Justice Mahlon Pitney dissented without issuing an opinion.

== Reception ==
Many legal analysts have argued that the decision implies that Congress and the President can essentially amend the Constitution by means of treaties with other countries. These concerns came to a head in the 1950s with the Bricker Amendment, a series of proposed amendments that would have placed restrictions on the scope and ratification of treaties and executive agreements entered into by the United States. More recently, a similar provision has been proposed as the fourth article of the Bill of Federalism, a list of ten proposed amendments drafted by law professor Randy Barnett.

Legal scholar Judith Resnik contests the implication that Missouri allows for treaties to expand the federal government's power, arguing that in the decades since the decision, courts have ruled that the Commerce Clause of the U.S. Constitution provides Congress with broader regulatory power without the need for a treaty.

Jurist and law professor Thomas Healy has suggested that Missouri may not be good law, meaning more recent decisions could overturn the ruling and establish new limits on the Treaty power.

== See also ==
- Louis Marshall, New York lawyer who submitted an amicus curae brief to the U.S. Supreme Court on Missouri v. Holland on behalf of the Association for the Protection of the Adirondacks
- List of United States Supreme Court cases, volume 252
- Living Constitution
- Bricker Amendment, one of several unsuccessful attempts during the 1950s to restrict the ability of the United States government to expand its power via treaties
- Reid v. Covert, a 1957 case which stated that no treaty can come in direct violation of the United States Constitution, a partial limitation of the ability of the United States to use treaties
- Medellín v. Texas (2008), U.S. Supreme Court case that casts some doubt on how broadly Missouri v. Holland can be applied. Texas had ignored obligations of the United States under a convention, despite a relevant presidential order and a finding of the International Court of Justice. The individual defendant (who had been sentenced to death) was held by the courts, including the Supreme Court, not to have any personal rights to challenge his conviction because of this breach of the United States' international obligations
- Bond v. United States (2014), raised similar question, but Supreme Court declined to reach the issue
