= Clara Bloodgood =

American actress (1868–1907)

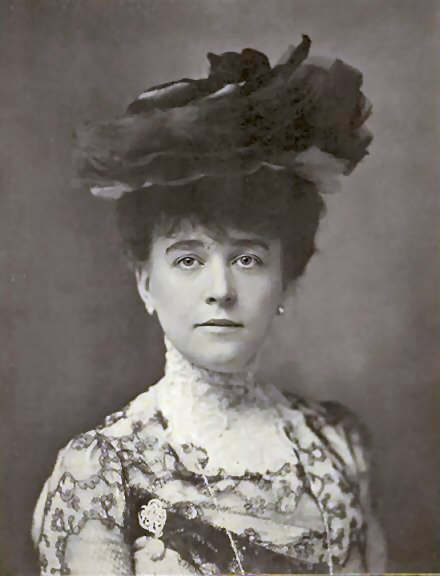
- Clara Bloodgood ca. 1901
- Born: Clara Sutton Stephens; August 28, 1868; Long Branch, New Jersey, U.S.
- Died: December 5, 1907 (aged 39); Baltimore, Maryland, U.S.
- Resting place: Green-Wood Cemetery
- Other names: Clara Havemeyer; Clara Sutton Laimbeer
- Occupation: Actress
- Years active: 1898–1907
- Spouses: William Moller Havemeyer (m. 1887; div. 1888) John “Jack” Bloodgood, Jr. (m. 1889; died 1897) William Laimbeer (m. 1902)

Clara Bloodgood (née Sutton Stephens; August 28, 1868 – December 5, 1907) was an American socialite who became a successful Broadway stage actress.

== Early life ==
Clara Sutton Stephens was born in Long Branch, New Jersey, the daughter of Edward Stephens and Annie Maria Sutton Stephens. Her father, a prominent New York attorney, was the son of author Ann S. Stephens. Her mother was one of three sisters once called “the beautiful Sutton girls” by New York's high society. As a young girl Clara attended St. Johns School in Brighton, England.

At around the age of seventeen Clara attracted the attention of two suitors, William Moller Havemeyer, the son of a wealthy sugar manufacturer and a member of the Havemeyer family, and John “Jack” Bloodgood, Jr., whose father made millions in banking over the years following the American Civil War. She eloped with Havemeyer in 1887 and divorced him within a year or so. She had a child with Havemeyer, who died at one year and 19 days old. She went on to marry Bloodgood in 1889, only to see him lose his inheritance and health within a very short period. His death in 1897, which left her in a dire financial situation, led Clara to attempt a career in theater. In 1902 she married William Laimbeer, a New York stock broker.

== Career ==
Clara Bloodgood's stage debut came in January 1898, at the Empire Theatre in New York playing a minor role in The Conquerors. The following season, at the same venue, she created the role Beatrice Hipgrave in Phroso. She later supported Annie Russell in Catherine and Miss Hobbs and toured with Amelia Bingham's Company in The Climbers. She next appeared with Arnold Daly in How He Lied to Her Husband, and a production of The Gentleman from India, in Boston. In 1905 at the Hudson Theatre in New York she played Violet Robinson in George Bernard Shaw's Man and Superman, with Robert Loraine. She became the leading exponent of plays by Clyde Fitch and worked for such Broadway impresarios as Charles Frohman, Charles Dillingham and Henry B. Harris. Reportedly her best friend in the acting profession was the actress and later screenwriter Zelda Sears, who appeared with her in her last play, The Truth.

== Death ==
On the night of December 5, 1907, just before that night's performance of The Truth, Bloodgood disrobed in her Baltimore hotel room and then shot herself in the mouth. Nearby lay a copy of a book titled How to Shoot Straight and a 38-caliber revolver. Anxiety over her career and losses she suffered in a failed business venture of her husband's may have played a factor in Bloodgood taking her own life.

Author Daniel Blum described Bloodgood's death:

Clara Bloodgood was playing the last role of her short but brilliant career in Clyde Fitch's THE TRUTH. The play ... was not a success, but in the fall she decided to take it on tour. While in Baltimore, she shot herself in a hotel room just before an evening performance. The motives for her suicide were never clearly established.

== See also ==
- Christine Norman
