= J. Hartley Manners =

London-born playwright

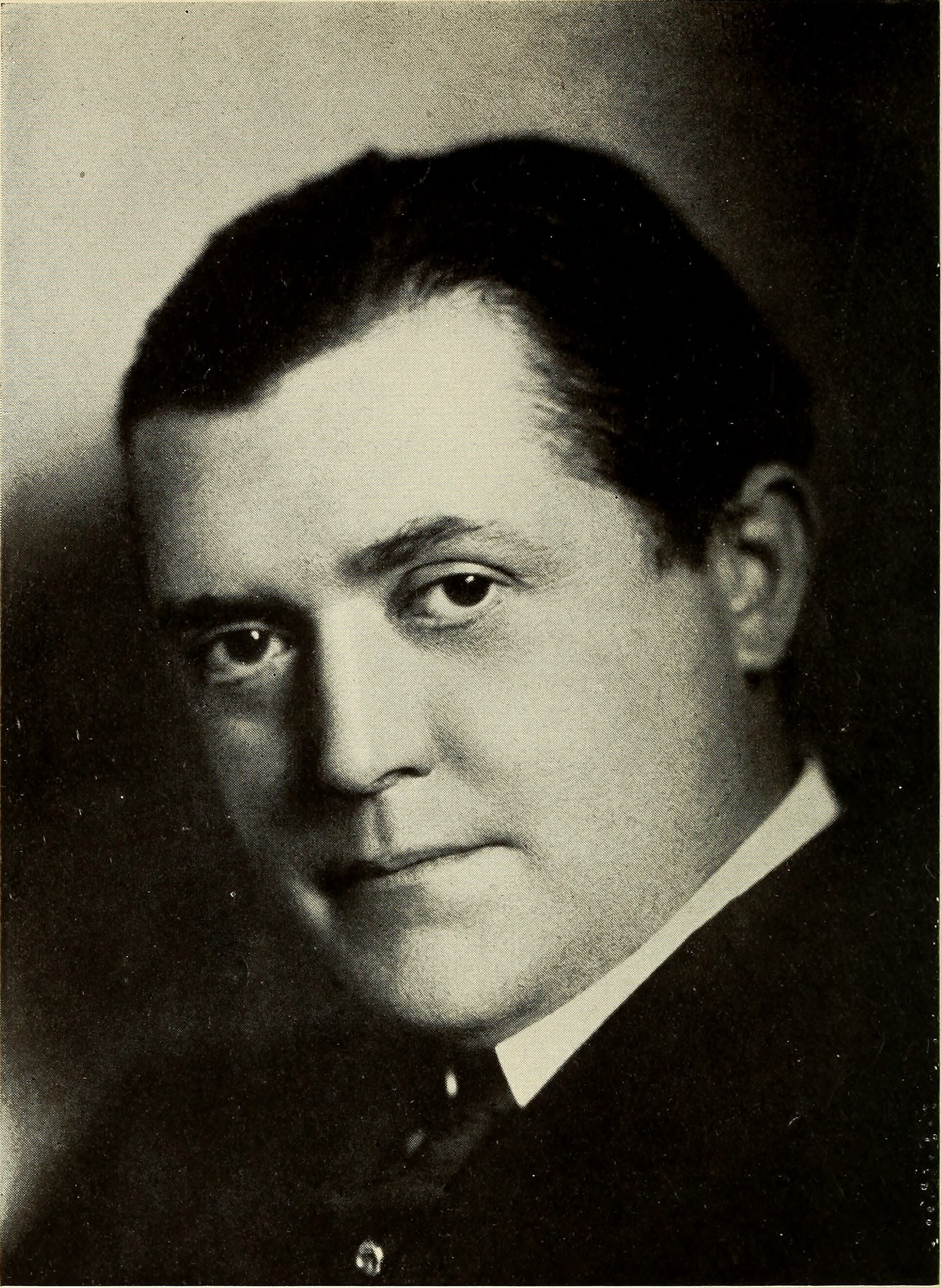
J. Hartley Manners, c. 1918

John Hartley Manners (10 August 1870 – 19 December 1928) was a London-born playwright of Irish extraction who wrote Peg o' My Heart, which starred his wife, Laurette Taylor, on Broadway in one of her greatest stage triumphs.

== Biography ==
Manners was born on 10 August 1870. He wrote the 1922 silent screen adaptation of his own 1912 play Peg o' My Heart, which starred Laurette. The 1933 sound remake starring Marion Davies was adapted from Manners' play as Manners had died in 1928. Manners also wrote two 1924 silent film screenplays which starred his wife in her only two other motion picture appearances, Happiness adapted from his play, and One Night in Rome. The latter his wife particularly enjoyed and kept a personal print to run over and over for guests.

Manners' one-act radio play The Queen's Messenger was adapted to become the first ever broadcast television drama, only three months before his death on 19 December 1928.

== Productions ==
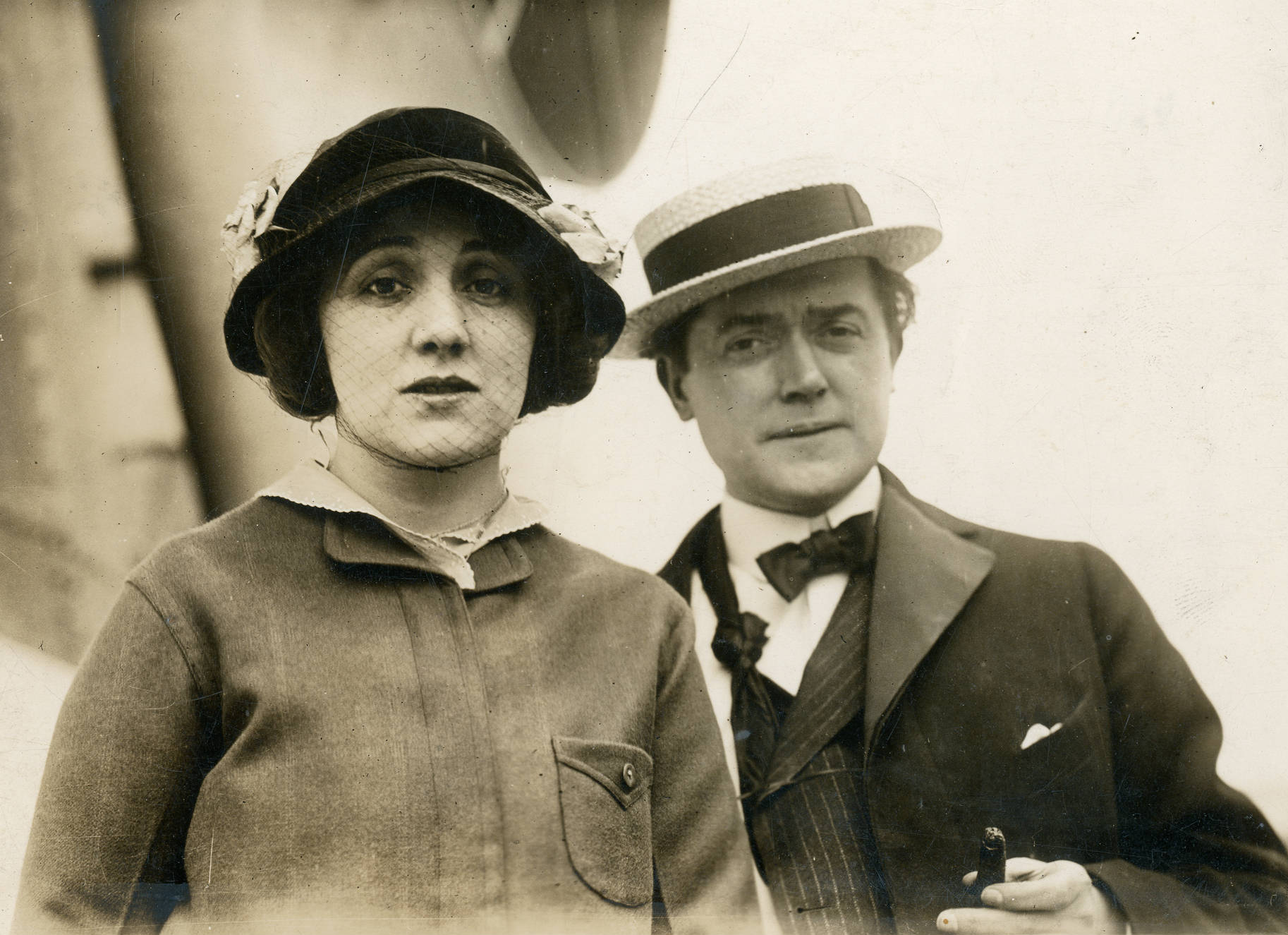
Manners and his wife, the actress Laurette Taylor, c. 1914

Peg o' My Heart, a comedy, played in New York City from December 20, 1912 to May 30, 1914. Afterwards it had a long run in London. The play was the subject of a United States Supreme Court case decided in 1920, Manners v. Morosco.

Manners' other plays include:

- As Once in May
- The Crossways, in collaboration with Lillie Langtry
- The Day of Dupes
- Ganton & Co.
- Getting Together
- The Girl and the Wizard
- The Girl in Waiting
- The Great John Ganton
- Happiness
- The Harp of Life
- The House Next Door
- The Indiscretion of Truth
- The Lancers
- The Majesty of Birth
- A Marriage of Reason
- The National Anthem
- One Night in Rome
- Out There
- The Patriot
- The Prince of Bohemia
- The Comedienne (1927)
- The Queen's Messenger
- A Woman Intervenes
- The Wooing of Eve
- Zira, with Henry Miller

He published Peg o' My Heart in 1913, and Happiness and Other Plays, including Just as Well and The Day of Dupes in 1914.

He died of esophageal cancer in New York City, aged 58.
