= One Night in Rome =

1924 film by Clarence G. Badger

- Lobby card
- Directed by: Clarence G. Badger
- Written by: J. Hartley Manners
- Based on: One Night in Rome by J. Hartley Manners
- Produced by: Metro-Goldwyn
- Starring: Laurette Taylor; Warner Oland; Alan Hale; Tom Moore
- Cinematography: Rudolph J. Bergquist
- Distributed by: Metro-Goldwyn
- Release date: September 29, 1924
- Running time: 70 minutes
- Country: United States
- Language: Silent (English intertitles)

One Night in Rome is a 1924 American silent drama film starring Laurette Taylor. The film was directed by Clarence G. Badger and written by J. Hartley Manners, Taylor's husband, and based upon his play of the same name. Laurette Taylor was a great name of the American theatre, who made only three films in a triumph-studded career, all of them derived from plays by her husband. This was the last of those three films (the previous two had been done by Metro Pictures). Taylor seems to have enjoyed making One Night in Rome as she kept a personal print of the movie to always show guests at her home, re-running it over and over again.

== Plot ==
Madame L'Enigme is a fortune-teller whose client Mario recognises her as a woman who disappeared in a cloud of scandal after her husband's suicide.

== Cast ==
- Laurette Taylor as Duchess Mareno/Madame L'Enigme
- Tom Moore as Richard Oak
- Alan Hale as Duke Mareno
- William Humphrey as George Milburne
- Joseph J. Dowling as Prince Danieli
- Miss DuPont as Zephyer Redlynch
- Warner Oland as Mario Dorando
- Brandon Hurst as Count Beetholde
- Edna Tichenor as Italian Maid
- Ralph Yearsley as Gardner

== Preservation ==
A print of One Night in Rome survives in the Gosfilmofond archive in Moscow, Russia.
