= Peg o' My Heart (1933 film) =

1933 film by Robert Zigler Leonard

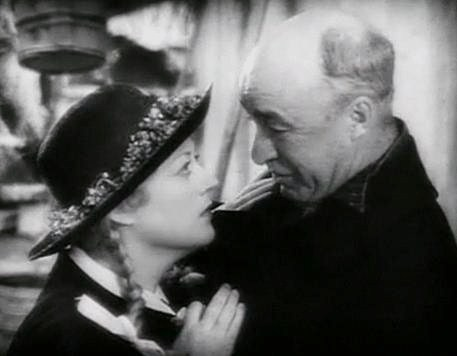
- Directed by: Robert Z. Leonard (uncredited)
- Screenplay by: Frank R. Adams; Frances Marion (adaptation)
- Based on: Peg o' My Heart; 1912 play by J. Hartley Manners
- Produced by: Robert Z. Leonard; John W. Considine Jr.
- Starring: Marion Davies; Onslow Stevens; J. Farrell MacDonald
- Cinematography: George Barnes
- Edited by: Margaret Booth
- Production companies: Cosmopolitan Productions; Metro-Goldwyn-Mayer
- Distributed by: Loew's Inc.
- Release date: May 26, 1933
- Running time: 87 minutes
- Country: United States
- Language: English

Peg o' My Heart is a 1933 American pre-Code romantic drama film directed by Robert Z. Leonard (who was uncredited) and starring Marion Davies as a poor Irish girl, Margaret 'Peg' O'Connell, who stands to inherit a fortune if she satisfies certain conditions. It is an adaptation of the play of the same name by J. Hartley Manners.

It was produced by Cosmopolitan Productions and Metro-Goldwyn-Mayer who has released it on May 26, 1933.

== Plot ==
Sir Gerald Markham Onslow Stevens arrives in Ireland to inform Peg's father that she has inherited her grandfather's estates in England. The conditions are that Peg must spend three years in England learning to be a lady and remain separated from her father. And the separation must be complete and permanent. At first her father refuses the approximately £2M estate, but then he realizes his daughter has been raised without a mother and lacks the refinements of a lady.

She is sent to London to live with her aunt, the penniless Mrs. Chichester, her daughter, Ethel, and spoiled, over-indulged son, Alaric. The Chichesters put up with the arrangement because they are paid 5000 pounds a year for hosting Peg.

Peg falls in love with Sir Gerald. Unfortunately he is in love with Ethel and proposes marriage, but Ethel is secretly having an affair with Christopher, who is married.

At Sir Gerald and Ethel's engagement party, Peg's father arrives and tells Sir Gerald he is leaving for America. Sir Gerald implies to Peg that her father is dead by saying her father has "gone" out to sea.

Later Peg catches Ethel trying to run away with Christopher. Peg runs off in Christopher's limo to confront him and Ethel arrives. Shortly thereafter so does his wife and detectives. The wife demands to see the woman who just ran in the room, but Peg comes out. Ethel is shocked when Christopher doesn't want his wife to divorce him.

When the scandal of Peg's part in Christopher's divorce breaks, she decides to leave London and return to Ireland. Sir Gerald confesses that her father is alive and learns about the money for her education.

Able to stop her father from sailing to America, they are celebrating in Ireland when Sir Gerald arrives to tell Peg he loves her.

== Cast ==
- Marion Davies as Margaret 'Peg' O'Connell
- Onslow Stevens as Sir Gerald Markham
- J. Farrell MacDonald as Patrick Shamus O'Connell
- Juliette Compton as Ethel Chichester
- Irene Browne as Mrs. Chichester
- Tyrell Davis as Alaric Chichester
- Alan Mowbray as Captain Christopher Brent
- Doris Lloyd as Mrs. Grace Brent
- Robert Greig as Jarvis the butler
