= Peg o' My Heart (1922 film) =

1922 film directed by King Vidor

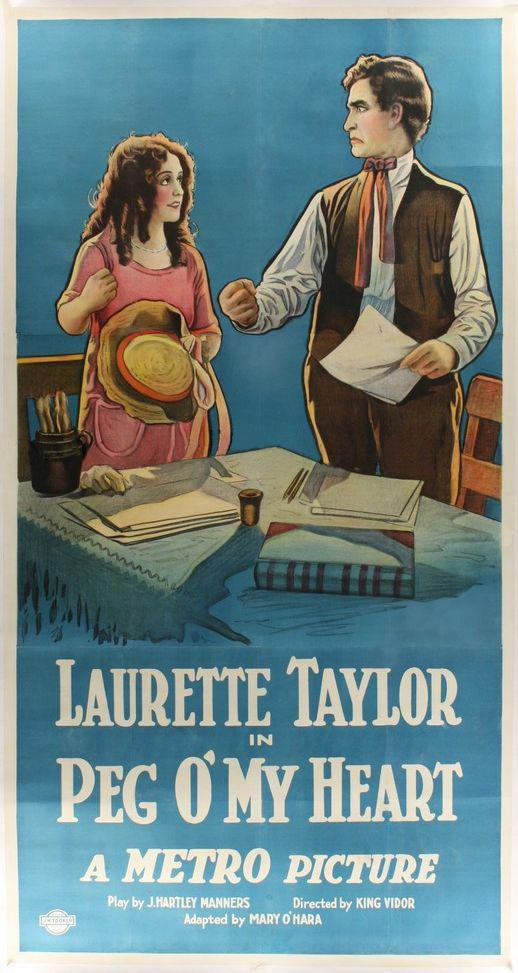
- Film poster
- Directed by: King Vidor
- Written by: Mary O'Hara
- Based on: Peg O' My Heart; 1918 novel by J. Hartley Manners
- Produced by: J. Hartley Manners
- Starring: Laurette Taylor
- Cinematography: George Barnes
- Edited by: Margaret Booth
- Distributed by: Metro Pictures
- Release date: December 18, 1922
- Running time: 80 minutes
- Country: United States
- Language: Silent (English intertitles)

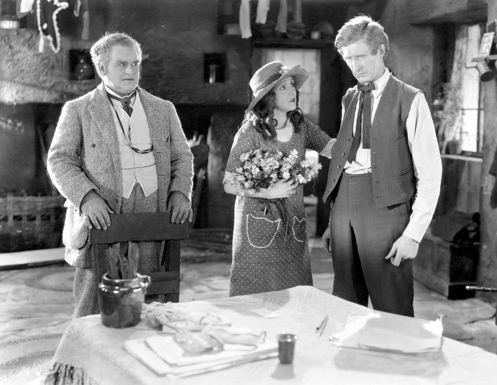
Lionel Belmore, Laurette Taylor and Russell Simpson in Peg o' My Heart.

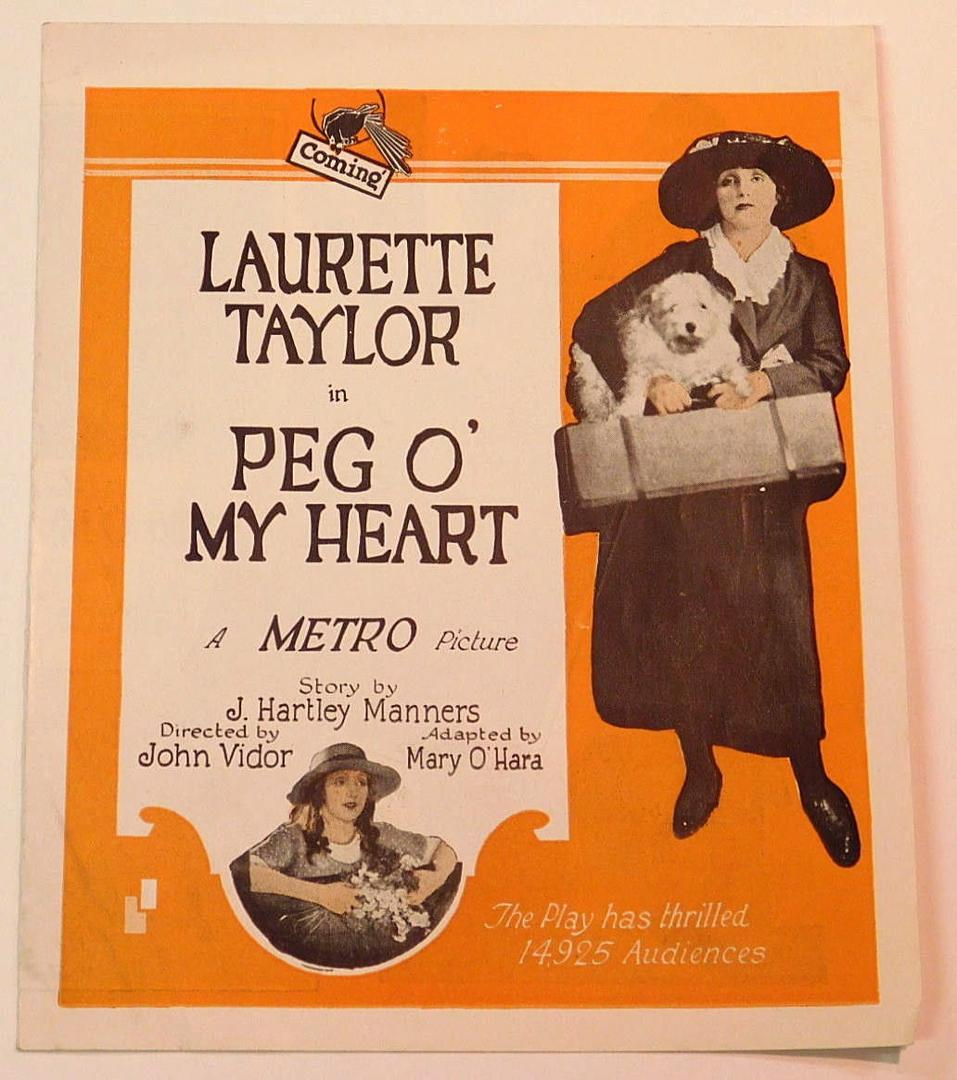
lobby poster.

Peg o' My Heart is a 1922 American silent drama film directed by King Vidor and starring Laurette Taylor. It is based on the 1912 play written by Taylor's husband J. Hartley Manners. The play starred Laurette Taylor and famously ran a record number of performances on Broadway. Six reels of the original eight reels survive at the Library of Congress.

== Plot ==
As described in a film publication, Margaret "Peg" O'Connell, according to her uncle's will, is to be educated in England under the supervision of her aunt, Mrs. Chichester. Upon her arrival from Ireland, she is looked down upon by the Chichester household for her lack of culture, and she vows never to become a lady. She meets Jerry, a young man from a neighboring estate, who becomes her friend. Then she discovers that he is Sir Gerald Adair and rebels at the deception he has been conducting. She also finds out that the only reason her aunt is keeping her is because of compensation from the will. Peg leaves to return home, but finds that she is in love with Gerald. Gerald follows her and proposes.

== Cast ==
- Laurette Taylor as Margaret O'Connell
- Mahlon Hamilton as Sir Gerald Adair
- Russell Simpson as Jim O'Connell
- Ethel Grey Terry as Ethel Chichester
- Nigel Barrie as Charistian Brent
- Lionel Belmore as Hawks
- Vera Lewis as Mrs. Chichester
- Fred Huntley as Jarvis, the butler (as Fred Huntly)

== Proposed Paramount film ==
In 1919 Famous Players–Lasky filmed a version of the play and it starred newcomer Wanda Hawley. However, because of legal issues with Laurette Taylor and her husband J. Hartley Manners—ultimately decided in the United States Supreme Court case Manners v. Morosco—the film was never released.

== Production ==
After his short-lived “Vidor Village” studio closed, King Vidor abandoned independent film-making and sought work with the dominant film studios.

Producer Louis B. Mayer, soon to form Metro-Goldwyn-Mayer offered him the task of adapting the stage production Peg o’ My Heart stage version to film. This would be the first of three plays Vidor would make for Mayer.

The popular Broadway actress Laurette Taylor who portrayed the “impish” Peg O’Connell, an 18-year-old Irish orphan girl, was cast to star in the film production and—at the age of thirty-eight (born 1884)—presented certain technical challenges.

The relatively insensitive film stock of the early 1920s required ample lighting to record images, and tended to reveal the chronological age of an actor.. Given these limitations, Vidor improvised with modified lens and succeeded in creating a sufficiently youthful screen appearance for Taylor. Vidor was not, however, able to suppress the stage mannerisms that Taylor had internalized during her lengthy Broadway career.

Taylor was delighted with Vidor's handling of the picture and frequently screened Peg o' My Heart at social gatherings, prompting guest actress Ethel Barrymore to warn Taylor that she would cease to attend her parties if she had to “sit through Peg o' My Heart again”.

== Theme ==
As written by Manners, Peg o' My Heart contrasts the snobbishness of the British upper-middle class (Peg's aunt Chichester) with the good-willed and sweetly sentimental character of the Irish lass, Peg - a commonplace theatrical conceit.

Vidor invests the film with a moral facet derived from his populism that champions agrarian self-reliance and political independence. In the film version, Peg's father emerges as an agitator for agrarian land reform, rather than a disaffected manual laborer as in the stage production. Peg's superiority to her aristocratic relatives is altered by Vidor, and now originates in her class orientation that holds rural populism as a virtue. As such, Vidor was able to invest an element of his social commitments into an “extremely restricted” cinematic project.

== Preservation status ==
Copies of the film exist at Cinematheque Royale de Belgique Brussels, Museum of Modern Art New York, Cinematheque Quebecoise, Montreal and Filmoteca Espanola, Madrid.
