= Laurette Taylor =

American actress (1883–1946)

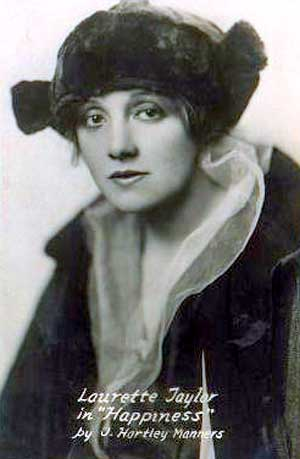
- Laurette Taylor ca. 1918
- Born: Loretta Helen Cooney; April 1, 1883; New York City, U.S.
- Died: December 7, 1946 (aged 63); New York City, U.S.
- Occupation: Actress
- Years active: 1912–1946
- Known for: The Glass Menagerie
- Spouses: Charles A. Taylor (m. 1901; div. 1910) J. Hartley Manners (m. 1912; died 1928)
- Children: 2, including Dwight Oliver Taylor

Laurette Taylor (born Loretta Helen Cooney; April 1, 1883 – December 7, 1946) was an American stage and silent film star who is particularly well known for originating the role of Amanda Wingfield in the first production of Tennessee Williams's play The Glass Menagerie.

== Personal life ==
Taylor was born of Irish heritage as Loretta Helen Cooney in New York City on April 1, 1883, to James and Elizabeth (née Dorsey) Cooney. She had a younger sister, Elizabeth. She married her first husband, Charles Alonzo Taylor (born South Hadley, Massachusetts – died Glendale, California), on May 1, 1901, at age 18. He was almost two decades her senior. They had two children, Dwight Oliver Taylor and Marguerite Courtney, but divorced c. 1910.

On December 22, 1912, she married British-born playwright J. Hartley Manners, who wrote the play Peg o' My Heart, a successful play and an enduring personal triumph for Taylor, who toured in it extensively throughout the U.S. The play's success inspired a 1922 film version starring Taylor and directed by King Vidor. A six-reel print of the film survives in the Motion Picture Division of the Library of Congress. Taylor remained married to Manners until his death in 1928. By law, Taylor lost her U.S. citizenship by marrying a foreign national. A widow, Taylor reclaimed her United States citizenship (cert #3234876) by naturalization on September 11, 1930. Her petition notes her "not having acquired any other nationality by affirmative act".

== Stage work ==
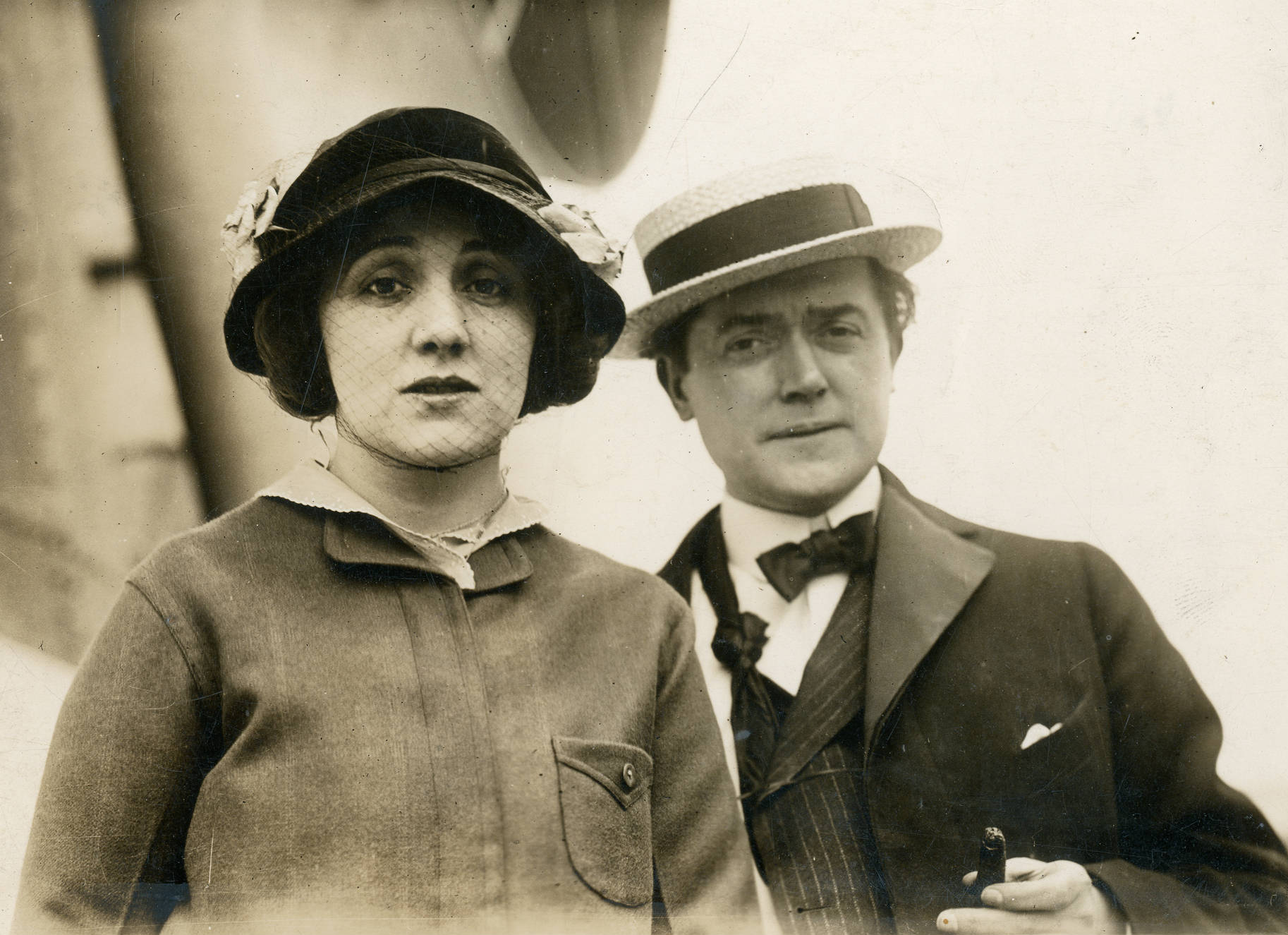
Taylor and her husband J. Hartley Manners circa 1914–1915

Taylor made her Broadway debut in The Great John Ganton in 1908 and appeared in other stage productions such as The Ringmaster, Alias Jimmy Valentine, Seven Sisters, Lola Lola, and The Bird of Paradise. Taylor also appeared in other productions, including One Night in Rome, The Wooing of Eve, and the special production Laurette Taylor in Scenes From Shakespeare. In the last production, she performed scenes from Romeo and Juliet, The Merchant of Venice, and The Taming of the Shrew.

According to New York Times theatre critic Brooks Atkinson, it was The Girl in Waiting (1910) that "made her a star." Of her acting, he wrote,

By the time she was in her late teens, she had created a highly individual technique of acting that was spontaneous and eloquent; it consisted of variations in tempo, tentative movements that were not quite completed, quizzical glances, absorption in what other actors were saying, and, of course, a warm, expressive voice that always seemed to be addressed directly to the individual theatergoer. 'Luminous' was the word most frequently used about her performances.

The effect was so seemingly spontaneous that, early in her career, some doubted she was deliberately acting, as "she employed none of the ritualistic mannerisms or extravagances of the conventional acting of her day."

In 1945, Taylor was voted the best actress in a poll by Variety.

Her biggest hit was Peg o' My Heart, a simple Cinderella-formula vehicle written for her by her husband Manners, it ran on Broadway from December 20, 1912, to May 1914, setting a new Broadway dramatic-play run record of 607 performances. The play earned her and her husband about US$10,000 a week, made Taylor "the most generally worshiped [theatrical] star of her time", and cemented her reputation as a skilled actress. After it closed on Broadway, Taylor starred in the London production until German zeppelin bombing closed it in 1915.

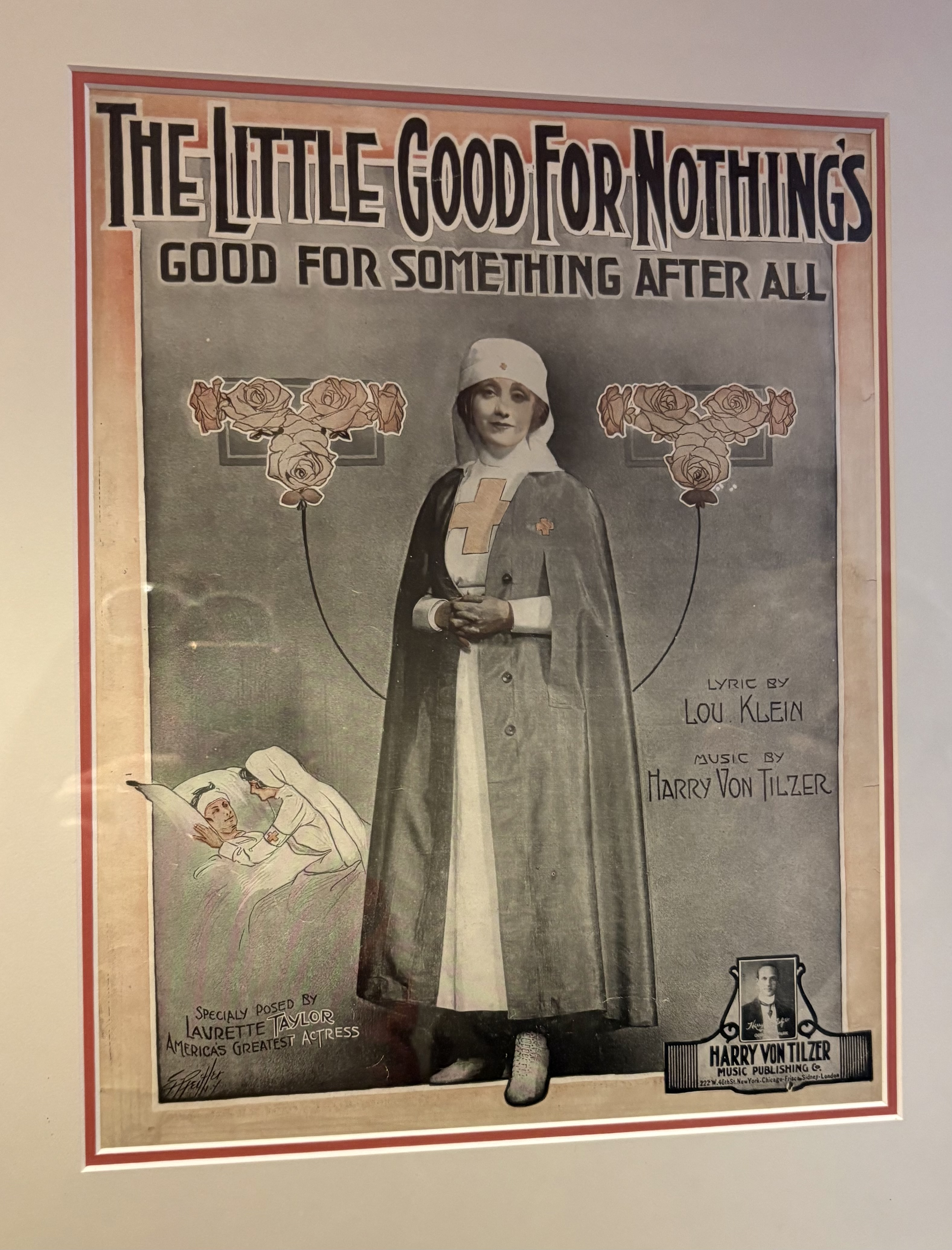
An American Red Cross Nursing Service recruitment poster from World War I, posed for by Taylor.

In 1917, she appeared in Out There (another vehicle written for her by Manners), playing "an obscure Cockney waif" who, "by patriotism and idealism", manages to become a uniformed Red Cross nurse. "She relieved the suffering of wounded English soldiers by attending to them professionally and by charming them in person". A line from the play—"If I go, will you go?"—became the headline of a highly effective armed forces recruiting poster.

In 1918, Taylor starred in Happiness, another successful Manners vehicle, and she reprised the role in the 1924 movie of the same name. According to Atkinson, the play version was "a sentimental comedy about a Brooklyn errand girl who taught a rich customer the secret of happiness."

Soon after, Taylor toured the nation with a revival of Peg o' My Heart, which reopened on Broadway at the Cort Theater on February 14, 1921, and ran for another 692 performances.

However, by the 1920s, public taste had become more sophisticated. Taylor always starred in the kind of simple, formulaic plays which had delighted pre-World War I middle-class audiences, and her popularity waned. New York Times theatre critic John Corbin wrote that she "had probably the greatest talent, the highest spirit of our times", but that her dated material held her back.

Attempting to change her course, Manners then wrote The National Anthem for her, a play with "high motives" which "rebuked and renounced the jazz generation." It opened in 1922 and unsurprisingly failed. It was the last time Taylor appeared in a play by her husband.

Few of Taylor's performances in movies survive.

In 1924, Taylor starred in a film version of Happiness, directed by King Vidor, which told of the adventures of a young shopgirl who learns that riches do not necessarily lead to happiness. The cast included Hedda Hopper and Pat O'Malley. The same year, Taylor starred in One Night in Rome, another screen version of Manners's dramatic play, in which she played the dual role of Duchess Mareno and Madame Enigme. Taylor seems to have enjoyed making One Night in Rome as she kept a personal print of the movie to show guests at her home, running it over and over again. Taylor's friend Noël Coward spent a weekend at her home. He was inspired by this visit to write, in just three days, his comedy of manners Hay Fever (1925).

The play, a comedic dissection of a family whose theatrical excesses drive their unsuspecting visitors to distraction, was a major hit from the moment of its debut on August 6, 1925. It also caused a serious and permanent rift in the friendship of Taylor and Coward. She suffered from severe alcoholism for many years, a condition which sharply limited her appearances from the late 1920s throughout her career. In 1938, she headed the cast in a revival of Outward Bound and did not appear again until her re-emergence in Williams's The Glass Menagerie in 1944; her performance received nearly unanimous rapturous reviews, and she won the New York Drama Critics Award for Best Actress of the season.

== Movies ==
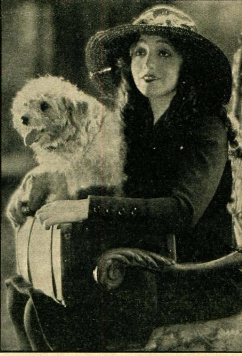
Peg o' My Heart (1923)

Taylor planned to make her film debut in Peg o' My Heart, but the film version of the hit play was coveted by nearly every screen actress, including Mary Pickford, who made an offer considerably in excess of the highest amount ever paid for the picture rights to a play or story. The rights to the film were coveted because of the production's established popularity. Almost any actress in the famous role was assured of a resounding success; however, Taylor clung to the movie rights if she decided to appear in a film. It took years for the play to be filmed and released. King Vidor remembered in his autobiography A Tree Is a Tree:

"I soon landed a job at the old Metro studio on Romaine Street—the assignment: to direct Laurette Taylor in Peg O' My Heart. Although I had never seen Miss Taylor, her name carried with it a certain magic to my young ears."

The play was considerably expanded for the film version, and the final production was an immediate success with audiences. Taylor made Happiness, and then One Night in Rome.

She never appeared in another film, but David O. Selznick did invite her to film a sound test for a role in his 1938 film The Young in Heart, which Taylor did, but she declined the part and actress Minnie Dupree was cast. (The test exists and has been shown on TV from time to time). In preparing interviews for what became Broadway: The Golden Age, Rick McKay asked each person who had influenced him or her the most", and Laurette Taylor's name often was mentioned. McKay devoted an entire section to Taylor, and it includes a section on her 1938 screen test.

== Approach to acting ==
Taylor wrote an essay on acting titled "The Quality Most Needed", which was included in some of the early editions of the text Actors on Acting. In it, Taylor muses on the importance of imagination over physical beauty for the actress wishing to truly create art. She sharply criticizes performances where you can "see the acting" and warns against paying too much attention to the traditions of acting, saying it "cramps creative instinct". To Taylor, the imaginative actress will leave you with a feeling that you can imagine her character's conduct "[i]n any position, aside from the situations involved in the actions of the play". Taylor applauded the imaginative actress who "builds a picture, using all her heart and soul and brain", not for the audience but for herself.

== Death ==
Taylor died from a coronary thrombosis on December 7, 1946, at age 63. Her ashes were interred at Woodlawn Cemetery in the Bronx.

== Legacy ==
Writing after Taylor's death, Tennessee Williams paid tribute to "the great warmth of her heart", stating "There was a radiance about her art which I can compare only to the greatest lines of poetry, and which gave me the same shock of revelation as if the air about us had been momentarily broken through by light from some clear space beyond us."

In 1960, the play Laurette, starring Judy Holliday and directed by José Quintero, closed out of town in Philadelphia owing to Holliday's battle with breast cancer. For years, film director George Cukor tried unsuccessfully to launch a film version of Taylor's life. In 1963, a musical adaptation of Laurette opened on Broadway. The musical, titled Jennie, starred Mary Martin in the title role. Its book by Arnold Schulman is credited as having been suggested by Marguerite Courtney's Laurette, and its score was by Howard Dietz and Arthur Schwartz. It ran for 82 performances, receiving mediocre reviews. The one-act play Opening Night appeared briefly off-Broadway in October 1963. Peggy Wood portrayed Fanny Ellis, a once-famous star who is in her dressing room preparing for a performance. Many thought Fanny was actually Taylor. Wood appeared with Ruth Gates. The play ran for 47 performances.

In the 2004 documentary Broadway: The Golden Age, by the Legends Who Were There, numerous Broadway veterans cited Taylor's performance in Glass Menagerie and Outward Bound as the most memorable stage performances they had seen. A rare sound film clip of Taylor in a screen test made for David O. Selznick's studio is included in the documentary. The test, for a role in the film The Young in Heart, reportedly did not meet the approval of studio executives.

=== Archive ===
According to her daughter, Marguerite Courtney, Laurette destroyed all press books, letters, programs, photograph albums, and other memorabilia associated with her life with J. Hartley Manners upon his death in 1928. In 1995 and 2009, the family placed the remainder of her papers at the Harry Ransom Center. The archive includes correspondence, personal and theater photographs, photograph albums, sound recordings, press reviews, articles, and legal documents, as well as writings by others. Elsewhere in the Ransom Center's holdings is Taylor's screen test for David O. Selznick and extensive collections relating to Tennessee Williams.

=== Notable fans ===
- Actor/teacher Uta Hagen's highly regarded 1991 acting text A Challenge for the Actor describes Taylor as her "idol" and "an inspiration", seeing her as the ultimate example of an actor working from the inside out. Hagen praised Taylor for saying that her identification with a character wasn't complete until she was "wearing the underpants of the character". Hagen's description of Taylor's acting was that she subjectively developed her actions and words, which "always sprang from her as though for the very first time".
- Actor Charles Durning described seeing Taylor's acting: "I thought they pulled her off the street. She was...so natural".
- Actor Martin Landau said Taylor "was almost like this woman had found her way into the theatre, through the stage door, and was sort of wandering around the kitchen".
- New York Theater Guild Actress Peg Entwistle (aka the "Hollywood Sign Girl") was a fan from the age of 13, having first seen Taylor in 1921 on Broadway in the revival of Peg O' My Heart. Entwistle was influenced so much by Taylor's performance that she changed her name from Millicent to Peg for the rest of her life. Years later, in 1932, Entwistle co-starred with Taylor on Broadway in James Barrie's comedy Alice Sit-by-the-Fire.
