= 90.9 FM =

FM radio frequency

The following radio stations broadcast on FM frequency 90.9 MHz:

== Argentina ==
- BT in Rosario, Santa Fe
- Boing in Rojas, Buenos Aires
- Chascomús in Chascomús, Buenos Aires
- Extremo in Avellaneda, Buenos Aires
- La Plata in La Plata, Buenos Aires
- La Única in Puerto Madryn, Chubut
- La Uno in Villa Mercedes, San Luis
- LRL307 UB in Buenos Aires
- Radio María in Castelli, Buenos Aires
- Radio María in Arroyito, Córdoba
- Radio María in Bell Ville, Córdoba
- Signos in Carmen de Patagones, Buenos Aires
- Total in Concepción del Uruguay, Entre Ríos
- Universidad in La Rioja
- Vida in Córdoba

== Australia ==
- 2KY in Mudgee, New South Wales
- 90.9 Sea FM in Gold Coast, Queensland
- Triple J in Launceston, Tasmania
- 3HCR in Omeo, Victoria

== Canada (Channel 215) ==
- CBBX-FM in Sudbury, Ontario
- CBF-FM-13 in St-Michel-Des-Saints, Quebec
- CBJX-FM-1 in Dolbeau, Quebec
- CBRA-FM in Milk River, Alberta
- CBUX-FM in Vancouver, British Columbia
- CBWF-FM in Flin Flon, Manitoba
- CBX-FM in Edmonton, Alberta
- CBYY-FM in Kersley, British Columbia
- CBZB-FM in Boiestown, New Brunswick
- CFVZ-FM in Moose Jaw, Saskatchewan
- CHPA-FM in Port Alberni, British Columbia
- CIAL-FM in London, Ontario
- CION-FM in Quebec City, Quebec
- CJSH-FM in St. John's, Newfoundland and Labrador
- CJSW-FM in Calgary, Alberta
- VF8002 in Louiseville, Quebec

== China ==
- CNR The Voice of China in Xiangxi
- SMG The First Economic Radio in Shanghai
- CNR Business Radio in Zhaoqing

== Indonesia ==
- RRI Programa 3 in Batam, Riau Island

== Japan ==
- YBS Radio in Kōfu, Yamanashi

== Malaysia ==
- Nasional FM in Ipoh, Perak

== Mexico ==
- XHAHC-FM in Chihuahua, Chihuahua
- XHANV-FM in Autlán de Navarro, Jalisco
- XHCUA-FM in Campeche, Campeche
- XHCY-FM in Huejutla de Reyes, Hidalgo
- XHHS-FM in Los Mochis, Sinaloa
- XHJAP-FM in Villahermosa, Tabasco
- XHK-FM in Nuevo Laredo, Tamaulipas
- XHMPD-FM in Miahuatlán, Oaxaca
- XHMQM-FM in Mérida, Yucatán
- XHOK-FM in Monterrey, Nuevo León
- XHPSAB-FM in Sabancuy, Campeche
- XHQRT-FM in Querétaro, Querétaro
- XHRYA-FM in Reynosa, Tamaulipas
- XHTEZ-FM in Teziutlán, Puebla
- XHTPI-FM in Tampico, Tamaulipas
- XHUIA-FM in Mexico City
- XHVER-FM in Veracruz, Veracruz
- XHVLN-FM in Villagran, Tamaulipas
- XHWZ-FM in Soledad Diez Gutiérrez, San Luis Potosí
- XHYTEM-FM in Yautepec, Morelos

== New Zealand ==
- Classic Hits FM in Gisborne and Westport
- ZM (New Zealand) in Wellington

== Philippines ==
- DYMM in Bogo City
- DYRN in Laoang
- DXKW in Dipolog City
- DXPC in Panabo City

== United States (Channel 215) ==
- KAMU in College Station, Texas
- KASF in Alamosa, Colorado
- KAVO (FM) in Pampa, Texas
- KBDG in Turlock, California
- KBNG-LP in Bangs, Texas
- KBSA in El Dorado, Arkansas
- KCBI-FM in Dallas, Texas
- KCPB in Warrenton, Oregon
- KCSD (FM) in Sioux Falls, South Dakota
- KDSD in Pierpont, South Dakota
- KDWG in Dillon, Montana
- KDYR in Dyer, Nevada
- KFLO-FM in Minden, Louisiana
- KFOI in Red Bluff, California
- KGCL in Jordan Valley, Oregon
- KGCM in Three Forks, Montana
- KGZO in Shafter, California
- KHCT (FM) in Great Bend, Kansas
- KHCX in Homer, Alaska
- KHDC in Chualar, California
- KIKL in Lafayette, Louisiana
- KJCH in Coos Bay, Oregon
- KJHL in Boise City, Oklahoma
- KJWR in Windom, Minnesota
- KKCR in Hanalei, Hawaii
- KKLU in Lubbock, Texas
- KKLW in Willmar, Minnesota
- KKRH in Grangeville, Idaho
- KKVO in Altus, Oklahoma
- KLLN in Newark, Arkansas
- KLOX in Creston, Iowa
- KLPT in Prescott, Arizona
- KLRC in Tahlequah, Oklahoma
- KLRV in Billings, Montana
- KLTP in San Angelo, Texas
- KLTQ in Thatcher, Arizona
- KLWV in Chugwater, Wyoming
- KMDY in Keokuk, Iowa
- KNFR in Gravel Ridge, Arkansas
- KNLN in Vienna, Missouri
- KOKF in Edmond, Oklahoma
- KOKT-LP in Tulsa, Oklahoma
- KOLG in Agana, Guam
- KPBG (FM) in Oroville, Washington
- KPNO in Norfolk, Nebraska
- KPSH in Coachella, California
- KRBM (FM) in Pendleton, Oregon
- KRCL in Salt Lake City, Utah
- KRCU in Cape Girardeau, Missouri
- KRGH in Holliday, Texas
- KRLH in Hereford, Texas
- KRRT (FM) in Arroyo Seco, New Mexico
- KRWA in Rye, Colorado
- KSHI in Zuni, New Mexico
- KSJE in Farmington, New Mexico
- KSKF (FM) in Klamath Falls, Oregon
- KSLU (FM) in Hammond, Louisiana
- KSMW in West Plains, Missouri
- KSPL (FM) in Kalispell, Montana
- KSWJ in Alexandria, Minnesota
- KSWP in Lufkin, Texas
- KTBG in Warrensburg, Missouri
- KTOL in Leadville, Colorado
- KTSU in Houston, Texas
- KTWJ in Moffit-Lincoln, North Dakota
- KUKV in Vernal, Utah
- KUMD in Deer Lodge, Montana
- KUNI in Cedar Falls, Iowa
- KUWG in Gillette, Wyoming
- KUWW in Fort Washakie, Wyoming
- KUWX in Pinedale, Wyoming
- KVDG in Midland, Texas
- KVNC in Minturn, Colorado
- KVNF in Paonia, Colorado
- KVTI in Tacoma, Washington
- KWRB in Bisbee, Arizona
- KWRC in Hermosa, South Dakota
- KWRK-LP in Fairbanks, Alaska
- KXJZ in Sacramento, California
- KXRT in Idabel, Oklahoma
- KYFS in San Antonio, Texas
- WAMK in Kingston, New York
- WAQB in Tupelo, Mississippi
- WAQV in Crystal River, Florida
- WATP in Laurel, Mississippi
- WBDG in Indianapolis, Indiana
- WBKC in Morgantown, Indiana
- WBSW in Marion, Indiana
- WBUR in Boston, Massachusetts
- WCDB in Albany, New York
- WCDR in Laporte, Pennsylvania
- WCFG in Springfield, Michigan
- WCGN in Tidioute, Pennsylvania
- WCNI in New London, Connecticut
- WCVJ in Jefferson, Ohio
- WCWM in Williamsburg, Virginia
- WDCB in Glen Ellyn, Illinois
- WDLK in Woodlake, Virginia
- WEKH in Hazard, Kentucky
- WETA (FM) in Washington, District of Columbia
- WEVW in Elysburg, Pennsylvania
- WFAZ in Goodwater, Alabama
- WFCO in Lancaster, Ohio
- WFTF in Rutland, Vermont
- WGBE in Bryan, Ohio
- WGUC in Cincinnati, Ohio
- WGXO in Magnolia, North Carolina
- WHRM (FM) in Wausau, Wisconsin
- WHYY in Philadelphia, Pennsylvania
- WILL in Urbana, Illinois
- WIRR in Virginia-Hibbing, Minnesota
- WJAB in Huntsville, Alabama
- WJKV in Jacksonville, Florida
- WJNY in Watertown, New York
- WJRC in Lewisburg, Pennsylvania
- WJWV in Fort Gaines, Georgia
- WKGG in Bolton, Connecticut
- WKMD in Madisonville, Kentucky
- WKMP-LP in Eastman, Georgia
- WKUE in Elizabethtown, Kentucky
- WKWO in Wooster, Ohio
- WLFE in Key Largo, Florida
- WLGI in Hemingway, South Carolina
- WLGV in Gloversville, New York
- WLNF in Rapids, New York
- WLYM-LP in Mayaguez-Anasco, Puerto Rico
- WMAO in Greenwood, Mississippi
- WMEH in Bangor, Maine
- WMPG in Gorham, Maine
- WMSD in Rose Township, Michigan
- WNBK (FM) in Whitmire, South Carolina
- WNZR in Mount Vernon, Ohio
- WOAK in La Grange, Georgia
- WODB-LP in Caguas, Puerto Rico
- WONY in Oneonta, New York
- WOWB in Brewton, Alabama
- WOXR in Schuyler Falls, New York
- WPRH in Paris, Tennessee
- WQFS in Greensboro, North Carolina
- WRAF (FM) in Toccoa Falls, Georgia
- WRCJ in Detroit, Michigan
- WRQM in Rocky Mount, North Carolina
- WSCS in New London, New Hampshire
- WSHB in Willard, Ohio
- WSIF in Wilkesboro, North Carolina
- WSLI-FM in Belding, Michigan
- WSLO in Malone, New York
- WSOR (FM) in Naples, Florida
- WSQG in Ithaca, New York
- WSQM in Noblesville, Indiana
- WTCK in Charlevoix, Michigan
- WTRK in Freeland, Michigan
- WUPJ in Escanaba, Michigan
- WURI in Manteo, North Carolina
- WUWS in Ashland, Wisconsin
- WVPM in Morgantown, West Virginia
- WVRI in Clifton Forge, Virginia
- WVVS-FM in Valdosta, Georgia
- WVYN in Bluford, Illinois
- WWOG in Cookeville, Tennessee
- WXAF in Charleston, West Virginia
- WYVM in Sheboygan, Wisconsin
- WZJO-LP in Columbia, South Carolina
- WZZH in Honesdale, Pennsylvania
