= List of FM radio stations in the United States by call sign (initial letters KN–KP) =

This is a list of FM radio stations in the United States having call signs beginning with the letters KN through KP. Low-power FM radio stations, those with designations such as KNAK-LP, have not been included in this list.

== KN-- ==
Callsign	Frequency	City of license
KNAA	90.7 FM	Show Low, Arizona
KNAB-FM	104.1 FM	Burlington, Colorado
KNAD	91.7 FM	Page, Arizona
KNAF-FM	105.7 FM	Fredericksburg, Texas
KNAG	90.3 FM	Grand Canyon, Arizona
KNAH	101.5 FM	Oakley, Utah
KNAL	93.3 FM	Port Lavaca, Texas
KNAN	106.7 FM	Nanakuli, Hawaii
KNAQ	89.3 FM	Prescott, Arizona
KNAR	89.3 FM	San Angelo, Texas
KNAS	105.5 FM	Nashville, Arkansas
KNAU	88.7 FM	Flagstaff, Arizona
KNBA	90.3 FM	Anchorage, Alaska
KNBB	97.7 FM	Dubach, Louisiana
KNBE	88.9 FM	Beatrice, Nebraska
KNBJ	91.3 FM	Bemidji, Minnesota
KNBQ	98.5 FM	Central Park, Washington
KNBR-FM	104.5 FM	San Francisco, California
KNBS	94.1 FM	Bowling Green, Missouri
KNBT	92.1 FM	New Braunfels, Texas
KNBX	91.7 FM	San Ardo, California
KNBZ	97.7 FM	Redfield, South Dakota
KNCA	89.7 FM	Burney, California
KNCB-FM	105.3 FM	Vivian, Louisiana
KNCC	91.5 FM	Elko, Nevada
KNCE	93.5 FM	Taos, New Mexico
KNCH	90.1 FM	San Angelo, Texas
KNCI	105.1 FM	Sacramento, California
KNCJ	89.5 FM	Reno, Nevada
KNCK-FM	94.9 FM	Concordia, Kansas
KNCM	91.3 FM	Appleton, Minnesota
KNCN	101.3 FM	Sinton, Texas
KNCO-FM	94.1 FM	Grass Valley, California
KNCQ	97.3 FM	Redding, California
KNCT-FM	91.3 FM	Killeen, Texas
KNCU	92.7 FM	Newport, Oregon
KNCW	92.7 FM	Omak, Washington
KNDA	102.9 FM	Alice, Texas
KNDD	107.7 FM	Seattle, Washington
KNDE	95.1 FM	College Station, Texas
KNDH	96.7 FM	Carbondale, Colorado
KNDL	100.7 FM	Berthold, North Dakota
KNDN-FM	97.5 FM	Shiprock, New Mexico
KNDR	104.7 FM	Mandan, North Dakota
KNDW	91.7 FM	Williston, North Dakota
KNDY-FM	95.5 FM	Marysville, Kansas
KNDZ	89.3 FM	McKinleyville, California
KNEB-FM	94.1 FM	Scottsbluff, Nebraska
KNEC	100.9 FM	Yuma, Colorado
KNEE	95.1 FM	Nenana, Alaska
KNEF	90.1	Franklin, Nebraska
KNEI-FM	103.5 FM	Waukon, Iowa
KNEK-FM	104.7 FM	Washington, Louisiana
KNEL-FM	95.3 FM	Brady, Texas
KNEN	94.7 FM	Norfolk, Nebraska
KNEO	91.7 FM	Neosho, Missouri
KNES	99.1 FM	Fairfield, Texas
KNEV	95.5 FM	Reno, Nevada
KNEX	106.1 FM	Laredo, Texas
KNEZ	107.3 FM	Hazen, Nevada
KNFA	90.7 FM	Grand Island, Nebraska
KNFM	92.3 FM	Midland, Texas
KNFO	106.1 FM	Basalt, Colorado
KNFR	90.9 FM	Gravel Ridge, Arkansas
KNFT-FM	102.9 FM	Bayard, New Mexico
KNFX-FM	99.5 FM	Bryan, Texas
KNFZ	104.7 FM	Bosque Farms, New Mexico
KNGA	90.5 FM	Saint Peter, Minnesota
KNGM	88.9 FM	Guymon, Oklahoma
KNGT	99.5 FM	Lake Charles, Louisiana
KNGW	88.9 FM	Juneau, Alaska
KNHC	89.5 FM	Seattle, Washington
KNHK-FM	101.9 FM	Weston, Oregon
KNHM	91.5 FM	Bayside, California
KNHT	102.5 FM	Rio Dell, California
KNIB	89.5 FM	Nikolai, Alaska
KNID	107.1 FM	North Enid, Oklahoma
KNIN-FM	92.9 FM	Wichita Falls, Texas
KNIS	91.3 FM	Carson City, Nevada
KNIV	104.7 FM	Lyman, Wyoming
KNIX-FM	102.5 FM	Phoenix, Arizona
KNIZ	90.1 FM	Gallup, New Mexico
KNKI	106.7 FM	Pinetop, Arizona
KNKK	107.1 FM	Needles, California
KNKL	88.1 FM	Tremonton, Utah
KNKO	88.5 FM	Shageluk, Alaska
KNKT	90.7 FM	Cannon Air Force Base, New Mexico
KNKX	88.5 FM	Tacoma, Washington
KNLB	91.1 FM	Lake Havasu City, Arizona
KNLE-FM	88.1 FM	Round Rock, Texas
KNLF	95.9 FM	Quincy, California
KNLG	90.3 FM	New Bloomfield, Missouri
KNLH	89.5 FM	Cedar Hill, Missouri
KNLL	90.5 FM	Nashville, Arkansas
KNLM	90.5 FM	Yucca Valley, California
KNLN	90.9 FM	Vienna, Missouri
KNLP	89.7 FM	Potosi, Missouri
KNLR	97.5 FM	Bend, Oregon
KNLT	95.5 FM	Palmer, Alaska
KNLV-FM	103.9 FM	Ord, Nebraska
KNLX	104.9 FM	Prineville, Oregon
KNLY	91.1 FM	New Waverly, Texas
KNMA	88.1 FM	Tularosa, New Mexico
KNMB	96.7 FM	Capitan, New Mexico
KNMC	90.1 FM	Havre, Montana
KNMI	88.9 FM	Farmington, New Mexico
KNMJ	100.9 FM	Eunice, New Mexico
KNMO-FM	97.5 FM	Nevada, Missouri
KNMZ	103.7 FM	Alamogordo, New Mexico
KNNA-FM	99.1 FM	Nenana, Alaska
KNNB	88.1 FM	Whiteriver, Arizona
KNNG	104.7 FM	Sterling, Colorado
KNNK	100.5 FM	Dimmitt, Texas
KNNU	92.3 FM	Antlers, Oklahoma
KNNW	103.1 FM	Columbia, Louisiana
KNNZ	89.1 FM	Hawley, Minnesota
KNOB	96.7 FM	Healdsburg, California
KNOD	105.3 FM	Harlan, Iowa
KNOF	95.3 FM	Saint Paul, Minnesota
KNOG	91.7 FM	Nogales, Arizona
KNOL	107.5 FM	Jean Lafitte, Louisiana
KNOM-FM	96.1 FM	Nome, Alaska
KNON	89.3 FM	Dallas, Texas
KNOR	93.7 FM	Krum, Texas
KNOW-FM	91.1 FM	Minneapolis-St. Paul, Minnesota
KNOZ	97.7 FM	Orchard Mesa, Colorado
KNPC	88.5 FM	Hardin, Montana
KNPH	89.3 FM	Havre, Montana
KNPJ	88.5 FM	Greybull, Wyoming
KNPM	91.5 FM	Miles City, Montana
KNPQ	107.3 FM	Hershey, Nebraska
KNPR	88.9 FM	Las Vegas, Nevada
KNPS	91.7 FM	Scobey, Montana
KNRB	100.1 FM	Atlanta, Texas
KNRG	92.3 FM	New Ulm, Texas
KNRI	89.7 FM	Bismarck, North Dakota
KNRK	94.7 FM	Camas, Washington
KNRQ	103.7 FM	Harrisburg, Oregon
KNRS-FM	105.9 FM	Centerville, Utah
KNRX	96.5 FM	Sterling City, Texas
KNSB	91.1 FM	Bettendorf, Iowa
KNSC	90.7 FM	Carroll, Iowa
KNSE	90.1 FM	Austin, Minnesota
KNSG	107.5 FM	Marshall, Minnesota
KNSH	100.7 FM	Fort Smith, Arkansas
KNSJ	89.1 FM	Descanso, California
KNSK	91.1 FM	Fort Dodge, Iowa
KNSL	97.9 FM	Lamoni, Iowa
KNSM	91.5 FM	Mason City, Iowa
KNSQ	88.1 FM	Mount Shasta, California
KNSR	88.9 FM	Collegeville, Minnesota
KNSS-FM	98.7 FM	Clearwater, Kansas
KNSU	91.5 FM	Thibodaux, Louisiana
KNSW	91.7 FM	Worthington-Marshall, Minnesota
KNSY	89.7 FM	Dubuque, Iowa
KNSZ	89.1 FM	Ottumwa, Iowa
KNTE	101.7 FM	Bay City, Texas
KNTI	99.5 FM	Lakeport, California
KNTK	93.7 FM	Firth, Nebraska
KNTN	102.7 FM	Thief River Falls, Minnesota
KNTO	93.3 FM	Chowchilla, California
KNTU	88.1 FM	McKinney–Denton, Texas
KNTY	103.5 FM	Sacramento, California
KNUE	101.5 FM	Tyler, Texas
KNUJ-FM	107.3 FM	Sleepy Eye, Minnesota
KNUL	99.1 FM	Nulato, Alaska
KNUN	91.9 FM	Toksook Bay, Alaska
KNUQ	103.9 FM	Paauilo, Hawaii
KNUT	101.1 FM	Garapan, Northern Mariana Islands
KNUW	95.1 FM	Santa Clara, New Mexico
KNUZ	106.1 FM	San Saba, Texas
KNVE	91.3 FM	Redding, California
KNVO-FM	101.1 FM	Port Isabel, Texas
KNVQ	90.7 FM	Spring Creek, Nevada
KNVR	102.5 FM	Fallon, Nevada
KNWB	97.1 FM	Hilo, Hawaii
KNWC-FM	96.5 FM	Sioux Falls, South Dakota
KNWD	91.7 FM	Natchitoches, Louisiana
KNWF	91.5 FM	Fergus Falls, Minnesota
KNWI	107.1 FM	Osceola, Iowa
KNWM	96.1 FM	Madrid, Iowa
KNWN-FM	97.7 FM	Oakville–Raymond, Washington
KNWO	90.1 FM	Cottonwood, Idaho
KNWP	90.1 FM	Port Angeles, Washington
KNWR	90.7 FM	Ellensburg, Washington
KNWS-FM	101.9 FM	Waterloo, Iowa
KNWT	89.1 FM	Cody, Wyoming
KNWU	91.5 FM	Forks, Washington
KNWV	90.5 FM	Clarkston, Washington
KNWY	90.3 FM	Yakima, Washington
KNXR	97.5 FM	Rochester, Minnesota
KNX-FM	97.1 FM	Los Angeles, California
KNXX	104.9 FM	Donaldsonville, Louisiana
KNYD	90.5 FM	Broken Arrow, Oklahoma
KNYE	95.1 FM	Pahrump, Nevada
KNYN	99.1 FM	Fort Bridger, Wyoming
KNYR	91.3 FM	Yreka, California
KNZA	103.9 FM	Hiawatha, Kansas
KNZR-FM	97.7 FM	Shafter, California
KNZS	100.3 FM	Arlington, Kansas

== KO-- ==
Callsign	Frequency	City of license
KOAB-FM	91.3 FM	Bend, Oregon
KOAC-FM	89.7 FM	Astoria, Oregon
KOAP	88.7 FM	Lakeview, Oregon
KOAR	101.5 FM	Beebe, Arkansas
KOAS	105.7 FM	Dolan Springs, Arizona
KOAY	88.7 FM	Middleton, Idaho
KOBB-FM	93.7 FM	Bozeman, Montana
KOBC	90.7 FM	Joplin, Missouri
KOBH	91.7 FM	Hobbs, New Mexico
KOBK	88.9 FM	Baker City, Oregon
KOBM-FM	97.3 FM	Blair, Nebraska
KOBN	90.1 FM	Burns, Oregon
KOBQ	93.3 FM	Albuquerque, New Mexico
KOCD	101. 5 FM	Okeene, Oklahoma
KOCN	105.1 FM	Pacific Grove, California
KOCP	104.7 FM	Oxnard, California
KOCU	90.1 FM	Altus, Oklahoma
KODA	99.1 FM	Houston, Texas
KODJ	94.1 FM	Salt Lake City, Utah
KODK	90.7 FM	Kodiak, Alaska
KODM	97.9 FM	Odessa, Texas
KODS	103.7 FM	Carnelian Bay, California
KODV	89.1 FM	Barstow, California
KODZ	99.1 FM	Eugene, Oregon
KOEA	97.5 FM	Doniphan, Missouri
KOEG	88.3 FM	Walters, Oklahoma
KOEL-FM	92.3 FM	Oelwein, Iowa
KOEZ	104.1 FM	Ames, Iowa
KOFG	91.1 FM	Cody, Wyoming
KOFH	99.1 FM	Nogales, Arizona
KOFK-FM	88.1 FM	Bozeman, Montana
KOFM	103.1 FM	Enid, Oklahoma
KOFW	91.9 FM	Deltana, Alaska
KOFX	92.3 FM	El Paso, Texas
KOGA-FM	99.7 FM	Ogallala, Nebraska
KOGJ	88.1 FM	Kenai, Alaska
KOGL	89.3 FM	Gleneden Beach, Oregon
KOGM	107.1 FM	Opelousas, Louisiana
KOGW	90.5 FM	Hartley, Texas
KOHH	90.7 FM	San Lucy, Arizona
KOHL	89.3 FM	Fremont, California
KOHM	105.7 FM	Ridgecrest, California
KOHN	91.9 FM	Sells, Arizona
KOHO-FM	101.1 FM	Leavenworth, Washington
KOHR	88.9 FM	Sheridan, Wyoming
KOHS	91.7 FM	Orem, Utah
KOHT	98.3 FM	Marana, Arizona
KOIA	88.1 FM	Storm Lake, Iowa
KOIR	88.5 FM	Edinburg, Texas
KOIT	96.5 FM	San Francisco, California
KOJB	90.1 FM	Cass Lake, Minnesota
KOJD	89.7 FM	John Day, Oregon
KOJI	90.7 FM	Okoboji, Iowa
KOJO	91.1 FM	Lake Charles, Louisiana
KOJP	95.3 FM	Presidio, Texas
KOKE-FM	99.3 FM	Thorndale, Texas
KOKF	90.9 FM	Edmond, Oklahoma
KOKN	88.7 FM	Oketo, Kansas
KOKO-FM	94.3 FM	Kerman, California
KOKQ	94.7 FM	Oklahoma City, Oklahoma
KOKR	96.7 FM	Newport, Arkansas
KOKS	89.5 FM	Poplar Bluff, Missouri
KOKU	100.3 FM	Agana, Guam
KOKY	102.1 FM	Sherwood, Arkansas
KOKZ	105.7 FM	Waterloo, Iowa
KOLA	99.9 FM	San Bernardino, California
KOLB	88.3 FM	Hartington, Nebraska
KOLC	97.3 FM	Carson City, Nevada
KOLD-FM	91.9 FM	Cold Bay, Alaska
KOLG	90.9 FM	Agana, Guam
KOLI	94.9 FM	Electra, Texas
KOLJ-FM	91.1 FM	Wannaska, Minnesota
KOLK	94.3 FM	Lakeside, Montana
KOLL	106.3 FM	Lonoke, Arkansas
KOLT-FM	100.7 FM	Cheyenne, Wyoming
KOLU	90.1 FM	Pasco, Washington
KOLV	100.1 FM	Olivia, Minnesota
KOLW	97.5 FM	Basin City, Washington
KOLY-FM	99.5 FM	Mobridge, South Dakota
KOLZ	102.9 FM	Kirtland, New Mexico
KOMA	92.5 FM	Oklahoma City, Oklahoma
KOMB	103.9 FM	Fort Scott, Kansas
KOMC-FM	100.1 FM	Kimberling City, Missouri
KOME-FM	95.5 FM	Tolar, Texas
KOMG	105.1 FM	Willard, Missouri
KOMP	92.3 FM	Las Vegas, Nevada
KOMQ	88.5 FM	Omak, Washington
KOMR	106.3 FM	Sun City, Arizona
KOMS	107.3 FM	Poteau, Oklahoma
KOMT	93.5 FM	Lakeview, Arkansas
KOMX	100.3 FM	Pampa, Texas
KONA-FM	105.3 FM	Kennewick, Washington
KOND	107.5 FM	Hanford, California
KONE	101.1 FM	Lubbock, Texas
KONI	104.7 FM	Lanai City, Hawaii
KONO-FM	101.1 FM	Helotes, Texas
KONQ	91.9 FM	Dodge City, Kansas
KONY	99.9 FM	Saint George, Utah
KOOC	106.3 FM	Belton, Texas
KOOI	106.5 FM	Jacksonville, Texas
KOOL-FM	94.5 FM	Phoenix, Arizona
KOOO	101.9 FM	Lincoln, Nebraska
KOOP	91.7 FM	Hornsby, Texas
KOOS	107.3 FM	North Bend, Oregon
KOOU	104.7 FM	Hardy, Arkansas
KOOV	106.9 FM	Kempner, Texas
KOOZ	94.1 FM	Myrtle Point, Oregon
KOPB-FM	91.5 FM	Portland, Oregon
KOPJ	89.3 FM	Sebeka, Minnesota
KOPN	89.5 FM	Columbia, Missouri
KOPR	94.1 FM	Butte, Montana
KOPW	106.9 FM	Plattsmouth, Nebraska
KOPY-FM	92.1 FM	Alice, Texas
KOQL	106.1 FM	Ashland, Missouri
KORA-FM	98.3 FM	Bryan, Texas
KORB	88.7 FM	Hopland, California
KORD-FM	102.7 FM	Richland, Washington
KORI	91.9 FM	Noorvik, Alaska
KORL-FM	101.1 FM	Waianae, Hawaii
KORN-FM	92.1 FM	Parkston, South Dakota
KORQ	96.1 FM	Winters, Texas
KORR	104.1 FM	American Falls, Idaho
KORT-FM	92.7 FM	Grangeville, Idaho
KORU	89.9 FM	Garapan, Saipan, Northern Marianas Islands
KORV	93.5 FM	Lakeview, Oregon
KOSB	105.1 FM	Perry, Oklahoma
KOSC	89.9 FM	Angwin, California
KOSE-FM	107.3 FM	Osceola, Arkansas
KOSF	103.7 FM	San Francisco, California
KOSG	103.9 FM	Pawhuska, Oklahoma
KOSI	101.1 FM	Denver, Colorado
KOSN	107.5 FM	Ketchum, Oklahoma
KOSO	92.9 FM	Patterson, California
KOSP	92.9 FM	Ozark, Missouri
KOSR	88.3 FM	Stillwater, Oklahoma
KOST	103.5 FM	Los Angeles
KOSU	91.7 FM	Stillwater, Oklahoma
KOSY-FM	95.7 FM	Anamosa, Iowa
KOTD	89.7 FM	The Dalles, Oregon
KOTE	93.9 FM	Eureka, Kansas
KOTM-FM	97.7 FM	Ottumwa, Iowa
KOTN	102.5 FM	Gould, Arkansas
KOTO	91.7 FM	Telluride, Colorado
KOTX	98.7 FM	Hebbronville, Texas
KOUA	91.9 FM	Ada, Oklahoma
KOUI	88.3 FM	Mount Pleasant, Texas
KOUL	107.7 FM	Agua Dulce, Texas
KOUT	98.7 FM	Rapid City, South Dakota
KOUW	102.9 FM	Island Park, Idaho
KOVE-FM	106.5 FM	Galveston, Texas
KOWI	101.3 FM	Oatman, Arizona
KOWY	102.3 FM	Dayton, Wyoming
KOWZ	100.9 FM	Blooming Prairie, Minnesota
KOXE	101.3 FM	Brownwood, Texas
KOYA	88.1 FM	Rosebud, South Dakota
KOYE	96.7 FM	Frankston, Texas
KOYH	95.5 FM	Elaine, Arkansas
KOYN	93.9 FM	Paris, Texas
KOYR	88.5 FM	Yorktown, Arkansas
KOYU	98.1 FM	Koyukuk, Alaska
KOYY	93.7 FM	Fargo, North Dakota
KOZA	96.9 FM	Effingham, Kansas
KOZB	97.5 FM	Livingston, Montana
KOZE-FM	96.5 FM	Lewiston, Idaho
KOZI-FM	93.5 FM	Chelan, Washington
KOZO	89.7 FM	Branson, Missouri
KOZQ-FM	102.3 FM	Waynesville, Missouri
KOZT	95.3 FM	Fort Bragg, California
KOZX	98.1 FM	Cabool, Missouri
KOZY-FM	101.3 FM	Bridgeport, Nebraska
KOZZ-FM	105.7 FM	Reno, Nevada

== KP-- ==
Callsign	Frequency	City of license
KPAC	88.3 FM	San Antonio, Texas
KPAE	91.5 FM	Erwinville, Louisiana
KPAL	91.3 FM	Palacios, Texas
KPAN-FM	106.3 FM	Hereford, Texas
KPAQ	88.1 FM	Plaquemine, Louisiana
KPAS	103.1 FM	Fabens, Texas
KPAT	95.7 FM	Orcutt, California
KPAU	103.5 FM	Center, Colorado
KPAW	92.9 FM	Warren AFB, Wyoming
KPAY-FM	93.9 FM	Chico, California
KPBA	99.3 FM	Pine Bluff, Arkansas
KPBG	90.9 FM	Oroville, Washington
KPBR	91.7 FM	Poplar Bluff, Missouri
KPBS-FM	89.5 FM	San Diego, California
KPBW	91.9 FM	Brewster, Washington
KPBX-FM	91.1 FM	Spokane, Washington
KPBZ	90.3 FM	Spokane, Washington
KPCC	89.3 FM	Pasadena, California
KPCH	99.3 FM	Ruston, Louisiana
KPCL	95.7 FM	Farmington, New Mexico
KPCO-FM	89.9 FM	Cooper, Texas
KPCS	89.7 FM	Princeton, Minnesota
KPCV	91.7 FM	Portales, New Mexico
KPCW	91.7 FM	Park City, Utah
KPDA	100.7 FM	Mountain Home, Idaho
KPDE	91.5 FM	Eden, Texas
KPDO	89.3 FM	Pescadero, California
KPDQ-FM	93.9 FM	Portland, Oregon
KPDR	90.3 FM	Wheeler, Texas
KPEK	100.3 FM	Albuquerque, New Mexico
KPEL-FM	96.5 FM	Breaux Bridge, Louisiana
KPEN-FM	101.7 FM	Soldotna, Alaska
KPEP	106.5 FM	Eldorado, Texas
KPEZ	102.3 FM	Austin, Texas
KPFA	94.1 FM	Berkeley, California
KPFB	89.3 FM	Berkeley, California
KPFC	91.9 FM	Callisburg, Texas
KPFK	90.7 FM	Los Angeles
KPFM	105.5 FM	Mountain Home, Arkansas
KPFR	89.5 FM	Pine Grove, Oregon
KPFT	90.1 FM	Houston, Texas
KPFX	107.9 FM	Kindred, North Dakota
KPFZ-FM	88.1 FM	Lakeport, California
KPGA	91.9 FM	Morton, Texas
KPGF	93.7 FM	Sun Valley, Nevada
KPGG	103.9 FM	Ashdown, Arkansas
KPGR	88.1 FM	Pleasant Grove, Utah
KPGS	88.1 FM	Pagosa Springs, Colorado
KPGT	89.1 FM	Watertown, South Dakota
KPGX	103.5 FM	Navajo Mountain, Utah
KPHA	91.7 FM	Mandan, North Dakota
KPHR	106.3 FM	Ortonville, Minnesota
KPHT	95.5 FM	Rocky Ford, Colorado
KPHW	104.3 FM	Kaneohe, Hawaii
KPIG-FM	107.5 FM	Freedom, California
KPIJ	88.5 FM	Junction City, Oregon
KPIN	101.1 FM	Pinedale, Wyoming
KPIO-FM	93.7 FM	Pleasanton, Kansas
KPIT	91.7 FM	Pittsburg, Texas
KPJH	89.5 FM	Polson, Montana
KPJM	88.1 FM	Payson, Arizona
KPJP	89.3 FM	Greenville, California
KPKK	101.1 FM	Amargosa Valley, Nevada
KPKO	91.3 FM	Pecos, Texas
KPKR	95.7 FM	Parker, Arizona
KPKW	90.3 FM	Susanville, California
KPKY	94.9 FM	Pocatello, Idaho
KPLA	101.5 FM	Columbia, Missouri
KPLD	101.1 FM	Kanab, Utah
KPLG	91.5 FM	Plains, Montana
KPLI	90.1 FM	Olympia, Washington
KPLK	88.9 FM	Sedro-Woolley, Washington
KPLM	106.1 FM	Palm Springs, California
KPLN	106.7 FM	Lockwood, Montana
KPLO-FM	94.5 FM	Reliance, South Dakota
KPLP	104.5 FM	White Salmon, Washington
KPLS-FM	97.7 FM	Strasburg, Colorado
KPLT-FM	107.7 FM	Paris, Texas
KPLU (FM)	100.7 FM	Palacios, Texas
KPLV	88.7 FM	Corpus Christi, Texas
KPLW	89.9 FM	Wenatchee, Washington
KPLX	99.5 FM	Fort Worth, Texas
KPLZ-FM	101.5 FM	Seattle, Washington
KPMA-FM	91.9 FM	Archer City, Texas
KPMB	88.5 FM	Plainview, Texas
KPMD	91.9 FM	Evanston, Wyoming
KPMI-FM	94.5 FM	Baudette, Minnesota
KPMW	105.5 FM	Haliimaile, Hawaii
KPMX	105.7 FM	Sterling, Colorado
KPNC	100.9 FM	Ponca City, Oklahoma
KPND	95.3 FM	Deer Park, Washington
KPNE-FM	91.7 FM	North Platte, Nebraska
KPNO	90.9 FM	Norfolk, Nebraska
KPNT	105.7 FM	Collinsville, Illinois
KPNW-FM	98.9 FM	Seattle, Washington
KPNY	102.3 FM	Alliance, Nebraska
KPOA	93.5 FM	Lahaina, Hawaii
KPOC-FM	104.1 FM	Pocahontas, Arkansas
KPOD-FM	97.9 FM	Crescent City, California
KPOI-FM	105.9 FM	Honolulu, Hawaii
KPOO	89.5 FM	San Francisco, California
KPOP	94.3 FM	Hartshorne, Oklahoma
KPOR	90.3 FM	Welches, Oregon
KPOV-FM	88.9 FM	Bend, Oregon
KPOW-FM	97.7 FM	La Monte, Missouri
KPPD	91.7 FM	Devils Lake, North Dakota
KPPK	98.3 FM	Rainier, Oregon
KPPL	92.5 FM	Poplar Bluff, Missouri
KPPO	90.5 FM	Mapusaga, American Samoa
KPPR	89.5 FM	Williston, North Dakota
KPPT-FM	100.7 FM	Depoe Bay, Oregon
KPPV	106.9 FM	Prescott Valley, Arizona
KPPW	88.7 FM	Williston, North Dakota
KPQ-FM	102.1 FM	Wenatchee, Washington
KPQG	104.3 FM	Goliad, Texas
KPQN	96.1 FM	Roswell, New Mexico
KPQP	106.1 FM	Panhandle, Texas
KPQS	106.7 FM	Waterford, California
KPQW	106.3 FM	Willows, California
KPQX	92.5 FM	Havre, Montana
KPRA	89.5 FM	Ukiah, California
KPRB	106.3 FM	Brush, Colorado
KPRC-FM	100.7 FM	Salinas, California
KPRD	88.9 FM	Hays, Kansas
KPRE	89.9 FM	Vail, Colorado
KPRF	98.7 FM	Amarillo, Texas
KPRG	89.3 FM	Agana, Guam
KPRH	88.3 FM	Montrose, Colorado
KPRI	91.3 FM	Pala, California
KPRJ	91.5 FM	Jamestown, North Dakota
KPRN	89.5 FM	Grand Junction, Colorado
KPRO	93.5 FM	Altus, Oklahoma
KPRQ	88.1 FM	Sheridan, Wyoming
KPRR	102.1 FM	El Paso, Texas
KPRS	103.3 FM	Kansas City, Missouri
KPRT-FM	107.9 FM	Kirtland, New Mexico
KPRU	103.3 FM	Delta, Colorado
KPRV-FM	92.5 FM	Heavener, Oklahoma
KPRW	99.5 FM	Perham, Minnesota
KPRX	89.1 FM	Bakersfield, California
KPSA-FM	98.5 FM	Lordsburg, New Mexico
KPSC	88.5 FM	Palm Springs, California
KPSD-FM	97.1 FM	Faith, South Dakota
KPSH	90.9 FM	Coachella, California
KPSI-FM	100.5 FM	Palm Springs, California
KPSL-FM	96.5 FM	Bakersfield, California
KPSM	99.3 FM	Brownwood, Texas
KPSO-FM	106.3 FM	Falfurrias, Texas
KPST-FM	103.5 FM	Coachella, California
KPSV-FM	91.9 FM	Tulare, California
KPTE	92.9 FM	Bayfield, Colorado
KPTJ	104.5 FM	Grape Creek, Texas
KPTX	98.3 FM	Pecos, Texas
KPTZ	91.9 FM	Port Townsend, Washington
KPUB	91.7 FM	Flagstaff, Arizona
KPUL	101.7 FM	Winterset, Iowa
KPUR-FM	95.7 FM	Claude, Texas
KPUS	104.5 FM	Gregory, Texas
KPUT	92.9 FM	Mona, Utah
KPUW	91.9 FM	Alpine, Wyoming
KPUY	97.3 FM	Garwood, Texas
KPVL	89.1 FM	Postville, Iowa
KPVO	99.9 FM	Fountain Green, Utah
KPVS	95.9 FM	Hilo, Hawaii
KPVU	91.3 FM	Prairie View, Texas
KPVW	107.1 FM	Aspen, Colorado
KPWA	93.5 FM	Bismarck, Arkansas
KPWB-FM	104.9 FM	Piedmont, Missouri
KPWD	91.7 FM	Lefors, Texas
KPWI	94.9 FM	Craig, Alaska
KPWJ	107.7 FM	Kurten, Texas
KPWR	105.9 FM	Los Angeles
KPWW	95.9 FM	Hooks, Texas
KPWY	90.7 FM	West Yellowstone, Montana
KPXP	97.9 FM	Garapan, Northern Mariana Islands
KPYG	94.9 FM	Cayucos, California
KPYM	106.1 FM	Matagorda, Texas
KPYR	88.3 FM	Craig, Colorado
KPZA-FM	103.7 FM	Jal, New Mexico
KPZE-FM	106.1 FM	Carlsbad, New Mexico
KPZK-FM	102.5 FM	Cabot, Arkansas
KPZX	94.7 FM	Paducah, Texas

== See also ==
- North American call sign
