= List of FM radio stations in the United States by call sign (initial letters WN–WP) =

This is a list of FM radio stations in the United States having call signs beginning with the letters WN through WP. Low-power FM radio stations, those with designations such as WNAP-LP, have not been included in this list.

== WN ==
Callsign	Frequency	City of license
WNAA	90.1 FM	Greensboro, North Carolina
WNAE	104.3 FM	Clarendon, Pennsylvania
WNAN	91.1 FM	Nantucket, Massachusetts
WNAP-FM	88.1 FM	Morristown, Indiana
WNAS	88.1 FM	New Albany, Indiana
WNAX-FM	104.1 FM	Yankton, South Dakota
WNBB	97.9 FM	Bayboro, North Carolina
WNBK	90.9 FM	Whitmire, South Carolina
WNBL	107.3 FM	South Bristol Township, New York
WNBT-FM	104.5 FM	Wellsboro, Pennsylvania
WNBU	94.1 FM	Oriental, North Carolina
WNBV	88.1 FM	Grundy, Virginia
WNBY-FM	93.9 FM	Newberry, Michigan
WNBZ-FM	106.3 FM	Saranac, New York
WNCB	93.9 FM	Cary, North Carolina
WNCC	104.1 FM	Franklin, North Carolina
WNCD	93.3 FM	Youngstown, Ohio
WNCH	88.1 FM	Norwich, Vermont
WNCI	97.9 FM	Columbus, Ohio
WNCK	89.5 FM	Nantucket, Massachusetts
WNCO-FM	101.3 FM	Ashland, Ohio
WNCQ-FM	102.9 FM	Canton, New York
WNCS	104.7 FM	Montpelier, Vermont
WNCT-FM	107.9 FM	Greenville, North Carolina
WNCU	90.7 FM	Durham, North Carolina
WNCV	93.3 FM	Shalimar, Florida
WNCW	88.7 FM	Spindale, North Carolina
WNCX	98.5 FM	Cleveland, Ohio
WNCY-FM	100.3 FM	Neenah–Menasha, Wisconsin
WNDD	92.5 FM	Alachua, Florida
WNDH	103.1 FM	Napoleon, Ohio
WNDI-FM	95.3 FM	Sullivan, Indiana
WNDV-FM	92.9 FM	South Bend, Indiana
WNDX	93.9 FM	Lawrence, Indiana
WNDY	91.3 FM	Crawfordsville, Indiana
WNEC-FM	91.7 FM	Henniker, New Hampshire
WNED-FM	94.5 FM	Buffalo, New York
WNEE	88.1 FM	Patterson, Georgia
WNEF	91.7 FM	Newburyport, Massachusetts
WNEQ	90.3 FM	Taylortown, New Jersey
WNEV	98.7 FM	Friar's Point, Mississippi
WNEW-FM	102.7 FM	New York City
WNEX-FM	100.9 FM	Perry, Georgia
WNFA	88.3 FM	Port Huron, Michigan
WNFB	94.3 FM	Lake City, Florida
WNFC	91.7 FM	Paducah, Kentucky
WNFM	104.9 FM	Reedsburg, Wisconsin
WNFN	106.7 FM	Franklin, Tennessee
WNFR	90.7 FM	Sandusky, Michigan
WNFZ	94.3 FM	Powell, Tennessee
WNGB	91.3 FM	Petersham, Massachusetts
WNGC	106.1 FM	Arcade, Georgia
WNGE	99.5 FM	Negaunee, Michigan
WNGH-FM	98.9 FM	Chatsworth, Georgia
WNGN	91.9 FM	Argyle, New York
WNGU	89.5 FM	Dahlonega, Georgia
WNHG	89.7 FM	Grand Rapids, Michigan
WNHI	106.5 FM	Farmington, New Hampshire
WNHU	88.7 FM	West Haven, Connecticut
WNHW	93.3 FM	Belmont, New Hampshire
WNIA	89.1 FM	Tarboro, North Carolina
WNIC	100.3 FM	Dearborn, Michigan
WNIE	89.1 FM	Freeport, Illinois
WNIJ	89.5 FM	DeKalb, Illinois
WNIK-FM	106.5 FM	Arecibo, Puerto Rico
WNIN-FM	88.3 FM	Evansville, Indiana
WNIQ	91.5 FM	Sterling, Illinois
WNIR	100.1 FM	Kent, Ohio
WNIU	90.5 FM	Rockford, Illinois
WNIW	91.3 FM	La Salle, Illinois
WNJA	89.7 FM	Jamestown, New York
WNJB-FM	89.3 FM	Bridgeton, New Jersey
WNJD	102.3 FM	Hartly, Delaware
WNJH	105.5 FM	Cape May Court House, New Jersey
WNJK	105.9 FM	Burgin, Kentucky
WNJM	89.9 FM	Manahawkin, New Jersey
WNJN-FM	89.7 FM	Atlantic City, New Jersey
WNJO	90.3 FM	Toms River, New Jersey
WNJP	88.5 FM	Sussex, New Jersey
WNJR	91.7 FM	Washington, Pennsylvania
WNJT-FM	88.1 FM	Trenton, New Jersey
WNJY	89.3 FM	Netcong, New Jersey
WNJZ	90.3 FM	Cape May Court House, New Jersey
WNKC	104.9 FM	Gloucester, Massachusetts
WNKI	106.1 FM	Corning, New York
WNKJ	89.3 FM	Hopkinsville, Kentucky
WNKL	96.9 FM	Wauseon, Ohio
WNKN	105.9 FM	Middletown, Ohio
WNKO	101.7 FM	Newark, Ohio
WNKR	106.7 FM	Williamstown, Kentucky
WNKT	107.5 FM	Eastover, South Carolina
WNKV	103.5 FM	Burgettstown, Pennsylvania
WNKX-FM	96.7 FM	Centerville, Tennessee
WNKZ-FM	92.5 FM	Pocomoke City, Maryland
WNLA-FM	95.3 FM	Drew, Mississippi
WNLC	98.7 FM	East Lyme, Connecticut
WNLD	88.1 FM	Decatur, Illinois
WNLF	95.9 FM	Macomb, Illinois
WNLI	94.5 FM	State College, Pennsylvania
WNLJ	91.7 FM	Madisonville, Kentucky
WNLS	91.3 FM	Slidell, Louisiana
WNLT	104.3 FM	Harrison, Ohio
WNLV	95.1 FM	Charlotte, North Carolina
WNMC-FM	90.7 FM	Traverse City, Michigan
WNML-FM	99.1 FM	Friendsville, Tennessee
WNMP	88.5 FM	Marlinton, West Virginia
WNMQ	103.1 FM	Columbus, Mississippi
WNMU-FM	90.1 FM	Marquette, Michigan
WNNA	106.1 FM	Beaver Springs, Pennsylvania
WNND	103.5 FM	Pickerington, Ohio
WNNF	94.1 FM	Cincinnati
WNNG-FM	99.9 FM	Unadilla, Georgia
WNNH	99.1 FM	Henniker, New Hampshire
WNNI	98.9 FM	Adams, Massachusetts
WNNJ	103.7 FM	Newton, New Jersey
WNNK-FM	104.1 FM	Harrisburg, Pennsylvania
WNNL	103.9 FM	Fuquay-Varina, North Carolina
WNNO-FM	106.9 FM	Wisconsin Dells, Wisconsin
WNNP	104.3 FM	Richwood, Ohio
WNNS	98.7 FM	Springfield, Illinois
WNNT-FM	107.5 FM	Warsaw, Virginia
WNNU	89.5 FM	Great Barrington, Massachusetts
WNNV	91.7 FM	San German, Puerto Rico
WNNX	100.5 FM	College Park, Georgia
WNNZ-FM	91.7 FM	Deerfield, Massachusetts
WNOB	93.7 FM	Chesapeake, Virginia
WNOC	89.7 FM	Bowling Green, Ohio
WNOD	94.1 FM	Mayagüez, Puerto Rico
WNOE-FM	101.1 FM	New Orleans, Louisiana
WNOH	105.3 FM	Windsor, Virginia
WNOI	103.9 FM	Flora, Illinois
WNOK	104.7 FM	Columbia, South Carolina
WNOR	98.7 FM	Norfolk, Virginia
WNOU	107.7 FM	Sasser, Georgia
WNOX	93.1 FM	Karns, Tennessee
WNPE	102.7 FM	Narragansett Pier, Rhode Island
WNPH	90.7 FM	Portsmouth, Rhode Island
WNPN	89.3 FM	Newport, Rhode Island
WNPP	88.5 FM	Cole, Indiana
WNPQ	95.9 FM	New Philadelphia, Ohio
WNPR	90.5 FM	Meriden, Connecticut
WNRK	90.7 FM	Norwalk, Ohio
WNRN-FM	91.9 FM	Charlottesville, Virginia
WNRQ	105.9 FM	Nashville, Tennessee
WNRS-FM	89.9 FM	Sweet Briar, Virginia
WNRT	96.9 FM	Manatí, Puerto Rico
WNRW	98.9 FM	Prospect, Kentucky
WNRX	99.3 FM	Jefferson City, Tennessee
WNRZ	91.5 FM	Dickson, Tennessee
WNSB	91.1 FM	Norfolk, Virginia
WNSC-FM	89.9 FM	Rock Hill, South Carolina
WNSL	100.3 FM	Laurel, Mississippi
WNSN	101.5 FM	South Bend, Indiana
WNSP	105.5 FM	Bay Minette, Alabama
WNSS	89.3 FM	Palm Coast, Florida
WNSV	104.7 FM	Nashville, Illinois
WNSX	97.7 FM	Winter Harbor, Maine
WNSY	100.1 FM	Talking Rock, Georgia
WNTB	93.7 FM	Topsail Beach, North Carolina
WNTE	89.5 FM	Mansfield, Pennsylvania
WNTH	88.1 FM	Winnetka, Illinois
WNTK-FM	99.7 FM	New London, New Hampshire
WNTQ	93.1 FM	Syracuse, New York
WNTR	107.9 FM	Indianapolis, Indiana
WNUB-FM	88.3 FM	Northfield, Vermont
WNUE-FM	98.1 FM	Titusville, Florida
WNUR-FM	89.3 FM	Evanston, Illinois
WNUS	107.1 FM	Belpre, Ohio
WNUX	89.7 FM	Montgomery, West Virginia
WNVE	98.7 FM	Culebra, Puerto Rico
WNVM	97.7 FM	Cidra, Puerto Rico
WNVU	93.5 FM	New Rochelle, New York
WNVZ	104.5 FM	Norfolk, Virginia
WNWC-FM	102.5 FM	Madison, Wisconsin
WNWN	98.5 FM	Coldwater, Michigan
WNWS-FM	101.5 FM	Jackson, Tennessee
WNWV	107.3 FM	Elyria, Ohio
WNWX	96.5 FM	Rhinelander, Wisconsin
WNXP	91.1 FM	Nashville, Tennessee
WNXR	107.3 FM	Iron River, Wisconsin
WNXT-FM	99.3 FM	Portsmouth, Ohio
WNXX	104.5 FM	Jackson, Louisiana
WNYC-FM	93.9 FM	New York City
WNYE	91.5 FM	New York City
WNYO	88.9 FM	Oswego, New York
WNYQ	101.7 FM	Hudson Falls, New York
WNYR-FM	98.5 FM	Waterloo, New York
WNYU-FM	89.1 FM	New York City
WNZN	89.1 FM	Lorain, Ohio
WNZR	90.9 FM	Mount Vernon, Ohio

== WO ==
Callsign	Frequency	City of license
WOAB	104.9 FM	Ozark, Alabama
WOAH	106.3 FM	Glennville, Georgia
WOAK	90.9 FM	La Grange, Georgia
WOAR	88.3 FM	South Vienna, Ohio
WOAS	88.5 FM	Ontonagon, Michigan
WOBB	100.3 FM	Tifton, Georgia
WOBC-FM	91.5 FM	Oberlin, Ohio
WOBE	100.7 FM	Crystal Falls, Michigan
WOBM-FM	92.7 FM	Toms River, New Jersey
WOBN	97.5 FM	Westerville, Ohio
WOBO	88.7 FM	Batavia, Ohio
WOBR-FM	95.3 FM	Wanchese, North Carolina
WOBX-FM	98.1 FM	Manteo, North Carolina
WOCE	101.9 FM	Ringgold, Georgia
WOCG	89.1 FM	Livingston, Tennessee
WOCL	105.9 FM	DeLand, Florida
WOCM	98.1 FM	Selbyville, Delaware
WOCN-FM	104.7 FM	Orleans, Massachusetts
WOCO-FM	107.1 FM	Oconto, Wisconsin
WOCR	89.7 FM	Olivet, Michigan
WODA	94.7 FM	Bayamón, Puerto Rico
WODC	93.3 FM	Ashville, Ohio
WODE-FM	99.9 FM	Easton, Pennsylvania
WODZ-FM	96.1 FM	Rome, New York
WOEL-FM	89.9 FM	Elkton, Maryland
WOES	91.3 FM	Ovid-Elsie, Michigan
WOEX	96.5 FM	Orlando, Florida
WOEZ	93.7 FM	Burton, South Carolina
WOFE	98.9 FM	Byrdstown, Tennessee
WOFM	89.1 FM	Alcoa, Tennessee
WOFN	88.7 FM	Beach City, Ohio
WOFR	89.5 FM	Schoolcraft, Michigan
WOFX-FM	92.5 FM	Cincinnati
WOGA	92.3 FM	Mansfield, Pennsylvania
WOGB	103.1 FM	Reedsville, Wisconsin
WOGG	94.9 FM	Oliver, Pennsylvania
WOGI	104.3 FM	Moon Township, Pennsylvania
WOGK	93.7 FM	Ocala, Florida
WOGL	98.1 FM	Philadelphia
WOGR-FM	93.3 FM	Salisbury, North Carolina
WOGT	107.9 FM	East Ridge, Tennessee
WOGY	104.1 FM	Jackson, Tennessee
WOHA	94.9 FM	Ada, Ohio
WOHC	90.1 FM	Chillicothe, Ohio
WOHF	92.1 FM	Bellevue, Ohio
WOHK	96.1 FM	Ashtabula, Ohio
WOI-FM	90.1 FM	Ames, Iowa
WOJB	88.9 FM	Reserve, Wisconsin
WOJC	89.7 FM	Crothersville, Indiana
WOJG	94.7 FM	Bolivar, Tennessee
WOJL	105.5 FM	Louisa, Virginia
WOJO	105.1 FM	Evanston, Illinois
WOKA-FM	106.7 FM	Douglas, Georgia
WOKD-FM	91.1 FM	Danville, Virginia
WOKG	90.3 FM	Galax, Virginia
WOKH	102.7 FM	Springfield, Kentucky
WOKI	98.7 FM	Oliver Springs, Tennessee
WOKK	97.1 FM	Meridian, Mississippi
WOKL	89.1 FM	Round Lake Beach, Illinois
WOKN	99.5 FM	Southport, New York
WOKO	98.9 FM	Burlington, Vermont
WOKQ	97.5 FM	Dover, New Hampshire
WOKV-FM	104.5 FM	Atlantic Beach, Florida
WOKW	102.9 FM	Curwensville, Pennsylvania
WOKZ	105.9 FM	Fairfield, Illinois
WOLD-FM	102.5 FM	Marion, Virginia
WOLF-FM	92.1 FM	Baldwinsville, New York
WOLG	95.9 FM	Carlinville, Illinois
WOLL	105.5 FM	Hobe Sound, Florida
WOLM	88.1 FM	D'Iberville, Mississippi
WOLN	91.3 FM	Olean, New York
WOLR	91.3 FM	Lake City, Florida
WOLS	106.1 FM	Waxhaw, North Carolina
WOLT	103.3 FM	Indianapolis, Indiana
WOLV	97.7 FM	Houghton, Michigan
WOLW	91.1 FM	Cadillac, Michigan
WOLX-FM	94.9 FM	Baraboo, Wisconsin
WOLZ	95.3 FM	Fort Myers, Florida
WOMB	89.9 FM	Ellettsville, Indiana
WOMC	104.3 FM	Detroit, Michigan
WOMG	98.5 FM	Lexington, South Carolina
WOMP	100.5 FM	Bellaire, Ohio
WOMR	92.1 FM	Provincetown, Massachusetts
WOMX-FM	105.1 FM	Orlando, Florida
WONA-FM	95.1 FM	Vaiden, Mississippi
WONC	89.1 FM	Naperville, Illinois
WONE-FM	97.5 FM	Akron, Ohio
WONU	89.7 FM	Kankakee, Illinois
WONY	90.9 FM	Oneonta, New York
WOOD-FM	106.9 FM	Muskegon, Michigan
WOOF-FM	99.7 FM	Dothan, Alabama
WOOL	91.5 FM	Bellows Falls, Vermont
WOOZ-FM	99.9 FM	Harrisburg, Illinois
WOPC	101.3 FM	Linden, Tennessee
WOPG-FM	89.9 FM	Esperance, New York
WOPR	88.1 FM	Madison, North Carolina
WORC-FM	98.9 FM	Webster, Massachusetts
WORD-FM	101.5 FM	Pittsburgh, Pennsylvania
WORG	100.3 FM	Elloree, South Carolina
WORI	90.1 FM	Harrison, Ohio
WORM-FM	101.7 FM	Savannah, Tennessee
WORO	92.5 FM	Corozal, Puerto Rico
WORQ	90.1 FM	Green Bay, Wisconsin
WORT	89.9 FM	Madison, Wisconsin
WORW	91.9 FM	Port Huron, Michigan
WORX-FM	96.7 FM	Madison, Indiana
WOSA	101.1 FM	Grove City, Ohio
WOSB	91.1 FM	Marion, Ohio
WOSE	91.1 FM	Coshocton, Ohio
WOSF	105.3 FM	Gaffney, South Carolina
WOSL	100.3 FM	Norwood, Ohio
WOSM	103.1 FM	Ocean Springs, Mississippi
WOSN	97.1 FM	Indian River Shores, Florida
WOSP	91.5 FM	Portsmouth, Ohio
WOSQ	92.3 FM	Spencer, Wisconsin
WOSR	91.7 FM	Middletown, New York
WOSU-FM	89.7 FM	Columbus, Ohio
WOSV	91.7 FM	Mansfield, Ohio
WOSX	91.1 FM	Granville, Ohio
WOTB	88.7 FM	Pearl River, Louisiana
WOTC	88.3 FM	Edinburg, Virginia
WOTH	107.9 FM	Williamsport, Pennsylvania
WOTJ	90.7 FM	Morehead City, North Carolina
WOTL	90.3 FM	Toledo, Ohio
WOTR	96.3 FM	Weston, West Virginia
WOTT	94.1 FM	Calcium, New York
WOTX	93.7 FM	Lunenburg, Vermont
WOUB-FM	91.3 FM	Athens, Ohio
WOUC-FM	89.1 FM	Cambridge, Ohio
WOUH-FM	91.9 FM	Chillicothe, Ohio
WOUL-FM	89.1 FM	Ironton, Ohio
WOUR	96.9 FM	Utica, New York
WOUX	105.3 FM	St. Marys, West Virginia
WOUZ-FM	90.1 FM	Zanesville, Ohio
WOVI	89.5 FM	Novi, Michigan
WOVK	98.7 FM	Wheeling, West Virginia
WOVM	91.1 FM	Appleton, Wisconsin
WOVO	96.7 FM	Auburn, Kentucky
WOVV	90.1 FM	Ocracoke, North Carolina
WOWA	93.7 FM	West Salem, Illinois
WOWB	90.9 FM	Brewton, Alabama
WOWC	105.3 FM	Morrison, Tennessee
WOWE	98.9 FM	Vassar, Michigan
WOWF	102.5 FM	Crossville, Tennessee
WOWI	102.9 FM	Norfolk, Virginia
WOWL	91.9 FM	Burnsville, Mississippi
WOWN	99.3 FM	Shawano, Wisconsin
WOWQ	101.7 FM	Central City, Pennsylvania
WOWY	103.1 FM	State College, Pennsylvania
WOWZ-FM	99.3 FM	Accomac, Virginia
WOXD	95.5 FM	Oxford, Mississippi
WOXF	105.1 FM	Oxford, Mississippi
WOXL-FM	96.5 FM	Biltmore Forest, North Carolina
WOXM	90.1 FM	Middlebury, Vermont
WOXO-FM	92.7 FM	Norway, Maine
WOXR	90.9 FM	Schuyler Falls, New York
WOXX	97.1 FM	Colebrook, New Hampshire
WOXY	94.5 FM	Englewood, Ohio
WOYE	97.3 FM	Rio Grande, Puerto Rico
WOYS	106.5 FM	Carrabelle, Florida
WOZI	101.9 FM	Presque Isle, Maine
WOZQ	91.9 FM	Northampton, Massachusetts
WOZZ	94.7 FM	Mosinee, Wisconsin

== WP ==
Callsign	Frequency	City of license
WPAC	98.7 FM	Ogdensburg, New York
WPAE	89.7 FM	Centreville, Mississippi
WPAI	90.7 FM	Nanty Glo, Pennsylvania
WPAK-FM	106.9 FM	Tigerton, Wisconsin
WPAP	92.5 FM	Panama City, Florida
WPAR	91.3 FM	Salem, Virginia
WPAS	89.1 FM	Pascagoula, Mississippi
WPAT-FM	93.1 FM	Paterson, New Jersey
WPAU	91.5 FM	Palmyra Township, Pennsylvania
WPAW	93.1 FM	Winston-Salem, North Carolina
WPBB	104.7 FM	Palm Beach Shores, Florida
WPBG	93.3 FM	Peoria, Illinois
WPBK	102.9 FM	Crab Orchard, Kentucky
WPBX	99.3 FM	Crossville, Tennessee
WPBZ-FM	103.9 FM	Rensselaer, New York
WPCD	88.7 FM	Champaign, Illinois
WPCJ	91.1 FM	Pittsford, Michigan
WPCK	104.9 FM	Denmark, Wisconsin
WPCL	97.3 FM	Spangler, Pennsylvania
WPCR-FM	91.7 FM	Plymouth, New Hampshire
WPCS	89.5 FM	Pensacola, Florida
WPCV	97.5 FM	Winter Haven, Florida
WPDA	106.1 FM	Jeffersonville, New York
WPDH	101.5 FM	Poughkeepsie, New York
WPDQ	91.3 FM	Scottsville, Kentucky
WPDT	105.1 FM	Coward, South Carolina
WPDX-FM	104.9 FM	Clarksburg, West Virginia
WPEA	90.5 FM	Exeter, New Hampshire
WPEB	88.1 FM	Philadelphia
WPEG	97.9 FM	Concord, North Carolina
WPEH-FM	92.1 FM	Louisville, Georgia
WPEI	95.9 FM	Saco, Maine
WPEL-FM	96.5 FM	Montrose, Pennsylvania
WPEN	97.5 FM	Burlington, New Jersey
WPEO-FM	98.3 FM	Farmer City, Illinois
WPER	90.5 FM	Fredericksburg, Virginia
WPEZ	93.7 FM	Jeffersonville, Georgia
WPFF	90.5 FM	Sturgeon Bay, Wisconsin
WPFG	91.3 FM	Carlisle, Pennsylvania
WPFL	105.1 FM	Century, Florida
WPFM	107.9 FM	Panama City, Florida
WPFT	106.3 FM	Pigeon Forge, Tennessee
WPFW	89.3 FM	Washington, District of Columbia
WPFX-FM	107.7 FM	Luckey, Ohio
WPGB	104.7 FM	Pittsburgh, Pennsylvania
WPGC-FM	95.5 FM	Morningside, Maryland
WPGI	93.7 FM	Georgetown, South Carolina
WPGL	90.7 FM	Pattersonville, New York
WPGM-FM	96.7 FM	Danville, Pennsylvania
WPGT	90.1 FM	Lake City, Florida
WPGU	107.1 FM	Urbana, Illinois
WPGW-FM	100.9 FM	Portland, Indiana
WPHD	98.7 FM	Corning, New York
WPHH	93.5 FM	Hope Hull, Alabama
WPHI-FM	103.9 FM	Jenkintown, Pennsylvania
WPHK	102.7 FM	Blountstown, Florida
WPHN	90.5 FM	Gaylord, Michigan
WPHP	91.9 FM	Wheeling, West Virginia
WPHR-FM	94.7 FM	Gifford, Florida
WPHS	89.1 FM	Warren, Michigan
WPHZ	102.5 FM	Orleans, Indiana
WPIA	98.5 FM	Eureka, Illinois
WPIB	91.1 FM	Bluefield, West Virginia
WPIG	95.7 FM	Olean, New York
WPIK	102.5 FM	Summerland Key, Florida
WPIL	91.7 FM	Heflin, Alabama
WPIM	90.5 FM	Martinsville, Virginia
WPIN-FM	91.5 FM	Dublin, Virginia
WPIO	89.3 FM	Titusville, Florida
WPIR	89.9 FM	Culpeper, Virginia
WPJC	88.3 FM	Pontiac, Illinois
WPJN	89.3 FM	Jemison, Alabama
WPJW	91.5 FM	Hurricane, West Virginia
WPJY	88.7 FM	Blennerhassett, West Virginia
WPKC-FM	92.1 FM	Sanford, Maine
WPKE-FM	103.1 FM	Coal Run, Kentucky
WPKF	96.1 FM	Poughkeepsie, New York
WPKG	92.7 FM	Neillsville, Wisconsin
WPKL	99.3 FM	Uniontown, Pennsylvania
WPKN	89.5 FM	Bridgeport, Connecticut
WPKO-FM	98.3 FM	Bellefontaine, Ohio
WPKQ	103.7 FM	North Conway, New Hampshire
WPKR	99.5 FM	Omro, Wisconsin
WPKT	89.1 FM	Norwich, Connecticut
WPKV	98.3 FM	Duquesne, Pennsylvania
WPLA	107.3 FM	Green Cove Springs, Florida
WPLH	88.3 FM	Tifton, Georgia
WPLJ	95.5 FM	New York City
WPLL	106.9 FM	Cross City, Florida
WPLM-FM	99.1 FM	Plymouth, Massachusetts
WPLN-FM	90.3 FM	Nashville, Tennessee
WPLR	99.1 FM	New Haven, Connecticut
WPLT	106.3 FM	Sarona, Wisconsin
WPLV	95.7 FM	Navarre, Florida
WPLW-FM	96.9 FM	Goldsboro, North Carolina
WPMA	102.7 FM	Buckhead, Georgia
WPMJ	94.3 FM	Chillicothe, Illinois
WPMW	88.5 FM	Middleborough Center, Massachusetts
WPMX	94.9 FM	Millen, Georgia
WPNA-FM	103.1 FM	Niles, Illinois
WPNC-FM	95.9 FM	Plymouth, North Carolina
WPNE	89.3 FM	Green Bay, Wisconsin
WPNG	101.9 FM	Pearson, Georgia
WPNH-FM	100.1 FM	Plymouth, New Hampshire
WPNJ	90.5 FM	Easton, Pennsylvania
WPNR-FM	90.7 FM	Utica, New York
WPOB	88.5 FM	Plainview, New York
WPOC	93.1 FM	Baltimore, Maryland
WPOK	93.7 FM	Pontiac, Illinois
WPOR	101.9 FM	Portland, Maine
WPOS-FM	102.3 FM	Holland, Ohio
WPOW	96.5 FM	Miami, Florida
WPOZ	88.3 FM	Orlando, Florida
WPPG	101.1 FM	Repton, Alabama
WPPI	95.5 FM	Topsham, Maine
WPPL	103.9 FM	Blue Ridge, Georgia
WPPN	106.7 FM	Des Plaines, Illinois
WPPR	88.3 FM	Demorest, Georgia
WPPY	92.7 FM	Starview, Pennsylvania
WPPZ-FM	107.9 FM	Pennsauken, New Jersey
WPQP	93.1 FM	Clearfield, Pennsylvania
WPRB	103.3 FM	Princeton, New Jersey
WPRC	88.7 FM	Sheffield, Illinois
WPRG	89.5 FM	Columbia, Mississippi
WPRH	90.9 FM	Paris, Tennessee
WPRJ	101.7 FM	Coleman, Michigan
WPRK	91.5 FM	Winter Park, Florida
WPRL	91.7 FM	Lorman, Mississippi
WPRM-FM	99.1 FM	San Juan, Puerto Rico
WPRO-FM	92.3 FM	Providence, Rhode Island
WPRR-FM	90.1 FM	Clyde Township, Michigan
WPRS-FM	104.1 FM	Waldorf, Maryland
WPRT-FM	102.5 FM	Pegram, Tennessee
WPRW-FM	107.7 FM	Martinez, Georgia
WPRY-FM	92.1 FM	Perry, Florida
WPRZ-FM	88.1 FM	Brandy Station, Virginia
WPSC-FM	88.7 FM	Wayne, New Jersey
WPSF	91.5 FM	Clewiston, Florida
WPSK-FM	107.1 FM	Pulaski, Virginia
WPSM	91.1 FM	Fort Walton Beach, Florida
WPSR	90.7 FM	Evansville, Indiana
WPST	94.5 FM	Trenton, New Jersey
WPSU	91.5 FM	State College, Pennsylvania
WPSX	90.1 FM	Kane, Pennsylvania
WPTE	94.9 FM	Virginia Beach, Virginia
WPTH	88.1 FM	Olney, Illinois
WPTI	94.5 FM	Eden, North Carolina
WPTJ	90.7 FM	Paris, Kentucky
WPTM	102.3 FM	Roanoke Rapids, North Carolina
WPTQ	105.3 FM	Glasgow, Kentucky
WPTS-FM	92.1 FM	Pittsburgh, Pennsylvania
WPTY	105.3 FM	Calverton-Roanoke, New York
WPUB-FM	102.7 FM	Camden, South Carolina
WPUC-FM	88.9 FM	Ponce, Puerto Rico
WPUP	100.1 FM	Watkinsville, Georgia
WPUR	107.3 FM	Atlantic City, New Jersey
WPUT	90.1 FM	North Salem, New York
WPVA	90.1 FM	Waynesboro, Virginia
WPVD-FM	103.7 FM	Westerly, Rhode Island
WPVL-FM	107.1 FM	Platteville, Wisconsin
WPVM	88.5 FM	Sturgeon Bay, Wisconsin
WPVQ-FM	95.3 FM	Greenfield, Massachusetts
WPWB	90.5 FM	Byron, Georgia
WPWQ	106.7 FM	Mount Sterling, Illinois
WPWV	90.1 FM	Princeton, West Virginia
WPWX	92.3 FM	Hammond, Indiana
WPWZ	95.5 FM	Pinetops, North Carolina
WPXC	102.9 FM	Hyannis, Massachusetts
WPXN	104.9 FM	Paxton, Illinois
WPXY-FM	97.9 FM	Rochester, New York
WPXZ-FM	104.1 FM	Punxsutawney, Pennsylvania
WPYK	104.1 FM	New Boston, Ohio
WPYO	95.3 FM	Maitland, Florida
WPYX	106.5 FM	Albany, New York
WPZA	107.9 FM	Canton, Illinois
WPZE	102.5 FM	Mableton, Georgia
WPZR	89.3 FM	Emporia, Virginia
WPZX	105.9 FM	Pocono Pines, Pennsylvania
WPZZ	104.7 FM	Crewe, Virginia

== See also ==
- North American call sign
