= KPOD =

KPOD may refer to:

- KPOD (AM), a radio station (1240 AM) licensed to Crescent City, California, United States
- KPOD-FM, a radio station (97.9 FM) licensed to Crescent City, California, United States
- Vapes that contain drugs, particularly etomidate.
- Drink pods created for use in Keurig coffee makers (primarily known as K-Cup pods)
