= KSFQ =

KSFQ may refer to:

- KLTQ (FM), a radio station (90.9 FM) licensed to serve Thatcher, Arizona, United States, which held the call sign KSFQ from 2012 to 2023
- KQLV (FM), a radio station (90.7 FM) licensed to serve Santa Fe, New Mexico, United States, which held the call sign KSFQ from 2007 to 2009
