= KBGR =

KBGR may refer to:

- The ICAO code for Bangor International Airport
- KOAR, a radio station (101.5 FM) licensed to Beebe, Arkansas, United States, known as KBGR from 2001 to 2009
