= KOKT =

KOKT may refer to:

- KOKT-LP, a low-power radio station (90.1 FM) licensed to serve Tulsa, Oklahoma, United States
- KOKT-LP (defunct), a defunct low-power television station (channel 20) formerly licensed to serve Sulphur, Oklahoma
