= KGFA =

KGFA may refer to:

- KGFA (FM), a radio station (90.7 FM) licensed to Great Falls, Montana, United States
- the ICAO code for Malmstrom Air Force Base
