= XHQRT-FM =

Radio station in Querétaro

- Querétaro, Querétaro; Mexico
- Frequency: 90.9 FM (HD Radio)
- Branding: 91 DAT

Programming
- Format: Pop music in English and Spanish

Ownership
- Owner: Respuesta Radiofónica; (Radiodifusora Querétaro, S.A. de C.V.)

History
- First air date: October 29, 1991 (concession)
- Call sign meaning: "Querétaro"

Technical information
- Class: C1
- ERP: 100,000 watts
- HAAT: 394.75 m
- Transmitter coordinates: 20°40′17.6″N 100°20′48.3″W

Links
- Website: 91dat.com.mx

XHQRT-FM is a radio station on 90.9 FM in Querétaro, Querétaro. The station is owned by Respuesta Radiofónica and carries a pop music format in English and Spanish known as 91 DAT.

XHQRT-FM broadcasts in HD from a tower atop Cerro de la Bandera northeast of the city Centre, giving great coverage to the southern area of the state of Querétaro including the whole city metro area, Pedro Escobedo, San Juan del Río, and parts of Guanajuato including Celaya, Cortázar and parts of Michoacán.

== History ==
XHQRT began with a concession awarded on October 29, 1991 to José Visoso del Valle. The concession was ceded in 1996.
