= XHCY-FM =

Radio station in Huejutla de Reyes, Hidalgo

- Huejutla, Hidalgo; Mexico
- Frequency: 90.9 FM
- Branding: XHCY 90.9

Programming
- Format: Regional Mexican

Ownership
- Owner: Telecomunicaciones de la Huasteca, S.A. de C.V.

History
- First air date: 1968
- Former call signs: XECY-AM
- Former frequencies: 1320 kHz, 930 kHz

Technical information
- Class: B1
- ERP: 15,000 watts
- Transmitter coordinates: 21°07′49″N 98°25′14″W

Links
- Website: laquemandaenhuejutla.com

XHCY-FM is a radio station on 90.9 FM in Huejutla, Hidalgo. It is owned by Telecomunicaciones de la Huasteca and carries a Regional Mexican format.

== History ==
XHCY began as XECY-AM 1320, which was later moved to 930. It was the first radio station in the region, owned by José Pinto Meneses and officially coming to the air in 1968. In 1977, Pinto Meneses sold the concession to Isabel Flores Vera.

In 2012, XECY signed on its FM station, with the AM frequency being shut down in 2015.
