= XHANV-FM =

Radio station in Autlán de Navarro, Jalisco

- Autlán de Navarro, Jalisco; Mexico
- Frequency: 90.9 FM
- Branding: Fiesta Mexicana

Programming
- Format: Grupera

Ownership
- Owner: José Pablo Pérez Ramírez

History
- First air date: September 26, 1997 (concession)
- Call sign meaning: Autlán de NaVarro

Technical information
- Licensing authority: CRT
- Class: C1
- ERP: 20 kW
- HAAT: 675.8 meters (2,217 ft)
- Transmitter coordinates: 19°41′19.4″N 104°23′46″W

XHANV-FM is a radio station on 90.9 FM in Autlán de Navarro, Jalisco. The station is known as Fiesta Mexicana with a grupera format.

== History ==
XHANV received its concession on September 26, 1997. It originally broadcast on 104.9 MHz.
