= WCWM =

- Williamsburg, Virginia; United States
- Broadcast area: Virginia Peninsula
- Frequency: 90.9 MHz
- Branding: WCWM 90.9

Programming
- Format: Variety

Ownership
- Owner: The College of William & Mary; (The College of William & Mary in Virginia)

History
- First air date: September 28, 1959
- Former frequencies: 89.1 MHz (1959–1985); 90.7 MHz (1985–2004)
- Call sign meaning: College of William and Mary

Technical information
- Licensing authority: FCC
- Facility ID: 65555
- Class: B1
- ERP: 13,500 watts
- HAAT: 82 meters (269 ft)
- Transmitter coordinates: 37°21′16.0″N 76°59′58.0″W

Links
- Public license information: Public file; LMS
- Webcast: Listen live
- Website: wcwm.wm.edu

WCWM is a variety formatted broadcast radio station licensed to Williamsburg, Virginia, serving the Virginia Peninsula. WCWM is owned and operated by the College of William & Mary.

== History ==
The first known radio activities at the College of William & Mary occurred in the spring of 1956, when a group of students, using equipment purchased in their own financial initiative, broadcast a weak signal from the Chapman House. Although many students and some faculty were behind the effort, this early initiative failed due to lack of administrative backing, according to a letter to the editor by former WCWM Program Director Fred Schaffer (class of 1957) that was published in the Flat Hat, the William & Mary newspaper, on March 10, 1959.

WCWM officially began operations in September, 1959, after two years of political process aimed at procuring funding and administrative approval, and another year to complete construction and obtain a broadcast license from the Federal Communications Commission (FCC). The station was originally licensed to operate at 89.1 megahertz with an effective radiated power of ten watts. The original operating schedule was daily from 4:55 pm to 10:30 pm. Programming featured news and mostly classical music.

WCWM has historically relied on a steady supply of student volunteers. During 1975 and 1976, WCWM upgraded its studios and transmitter to stereophonic operation and increased its effective radiated power to 1,600 watts, according to former student John Keimig (class of 1978), who worked in the station's engineering department during that time. The whole process of procuring and installing facility equipment and submitting the necessary applications to the FCC was initiated by student station manager Rick Krizman and financial officer Jim Harmon, and implemented by student volunteers who held other leadership positions at the station. The college provided funding and administrative support. Programming in those years typically ran from 7:00 am to 3:00 am, with continuous operation when volunteer staff were available to fill the "graveyard" shift. The station's frequency changed from 89.1 MHz to 90.7 MHz before the 1985–86 academic year.

Since then, the station has grown to a 13,500 watt signal and the frequency changed once again from 90.7 MHz to 90.9 MHz. The station continues to draw a majority of its talent and personnel from the William & Mary student body.

In 2012, WCWM hosted the first music festival at the College of William & Mary, WCWM Fest, featuring The Walkmen and The Mountain Goats as headliners. Subsequent WCWM Fests have featured headliners such as Frankie Cosmos, Remember Sports, Half Waif, Vagabon, and Lucy Dacus.

In early 2026, the College of William & Mary requested that WCWM's FCC license be canceled. As of April 2026, it continues to operate as an Internet radio station.
