= KLLN =

- Newark, Arkansas; United States
- Frequency: 90.9 MHz
- Branding: Timberwolf Radio

Ownership
- Owner: Cedar Ridge School District

Technical information
- Licensing authority: FCC
- Facility ID: 48700
- Class: C3
- ERP: 4,000 watts
- HAAT: 139 metres (456 ft)
- Transmitter coordinates: 35°43′25″N 91°26′40″W

Links
- Public license information: Public file; LMS
- Website: Official Website

KLLN (90.9 FM) is a radio station licensed to serve the community of Newark, Arkansas. The station is owned by the Cedar Ridge School District.

The station was assigned the KLLN call letters by the Federal Communications Commission on June 13, 1983.
