= KNFR =

- Gravel Ridge, Arkansas; United States
- Broadcast area: Northeastern Little Rock Metropolitan Area; Cabot, Arkansas; Jacksonville, Arkansas
- Frequency: 90.9 MHz

Programming
- Format: Christian radio

Ownership
- Owner: Fellowship Christian Church

Technical information
- Licensing authority: FCC
- Facility ID: 175961
- Class: A
- ERP: 1,500 watts
- HAAT: 125 meters (410 ft)
- Transmitter coordinates: 35°00′21″N 92°04′27″W

Links
- Public license information: Public file; LMS
- Website: knfr.org

KNFR is a Christian radio station licensed to Gravel Ridge, Arkansas, broadcasting on 90.9 FM. The station serves the northeastern Little Rock Metropolitan Area, and is owned by Fellowship Christian Church.
