= KLTQ (FM) =

Radio station in Thatcher, Arizona

- Thatcher, Arizona; United States
- Broadcast area: Safford, Arizona
- Frequency: 90.9 MHz

Programming
- Format: Contemporary Christian
- Network: K-Love

Ownership
- Owner: Educational Media Foundation

History
- First air date: 2012
- Former call signs: KSFQ (2012–2023)

Technical information
- Licensing authority: FCC
- Facility ID: 176391
- Class: C2
- ERP: 600 watts
- HAAT: 687 meters (2,254 ft)
- Transmitter coordinates: 32°53′22″N 109°19′23″W

Links
- Public license information: Public file; LMS

KLTQ (90.9 FM) is a radio station in Thatcher, Arizona. The station is currently owned by Educational Media Foundation. and broadcasts the K-Love contemporary Christian music network.

== History ==
KLTQ signed on the air in 2012 as KSFQ. The station was owned by the Cochise Community Radio Corporation, the noncommercial division of Cochise Broadcasting, but it barely operated at all. In a 2017 consent decree, the Federal Communications Commission required Cochise to unload the licenses of KSFQ and nine other stations that had minimal to nonexistent broadcast histories. The station was donated to Good News Radio Broadcasting, Inc., owners of Tucson's KVOI, that September.

Effective December 16, 2022, Good News Radio Broadcasting donated KSFQ and sister station KXMK to Educational Media Foundation. EMF changed the station's call sign to KLTQ on January 10, 2023.
