= XHUIA-FM =

Radio station in Mexico City

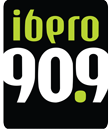

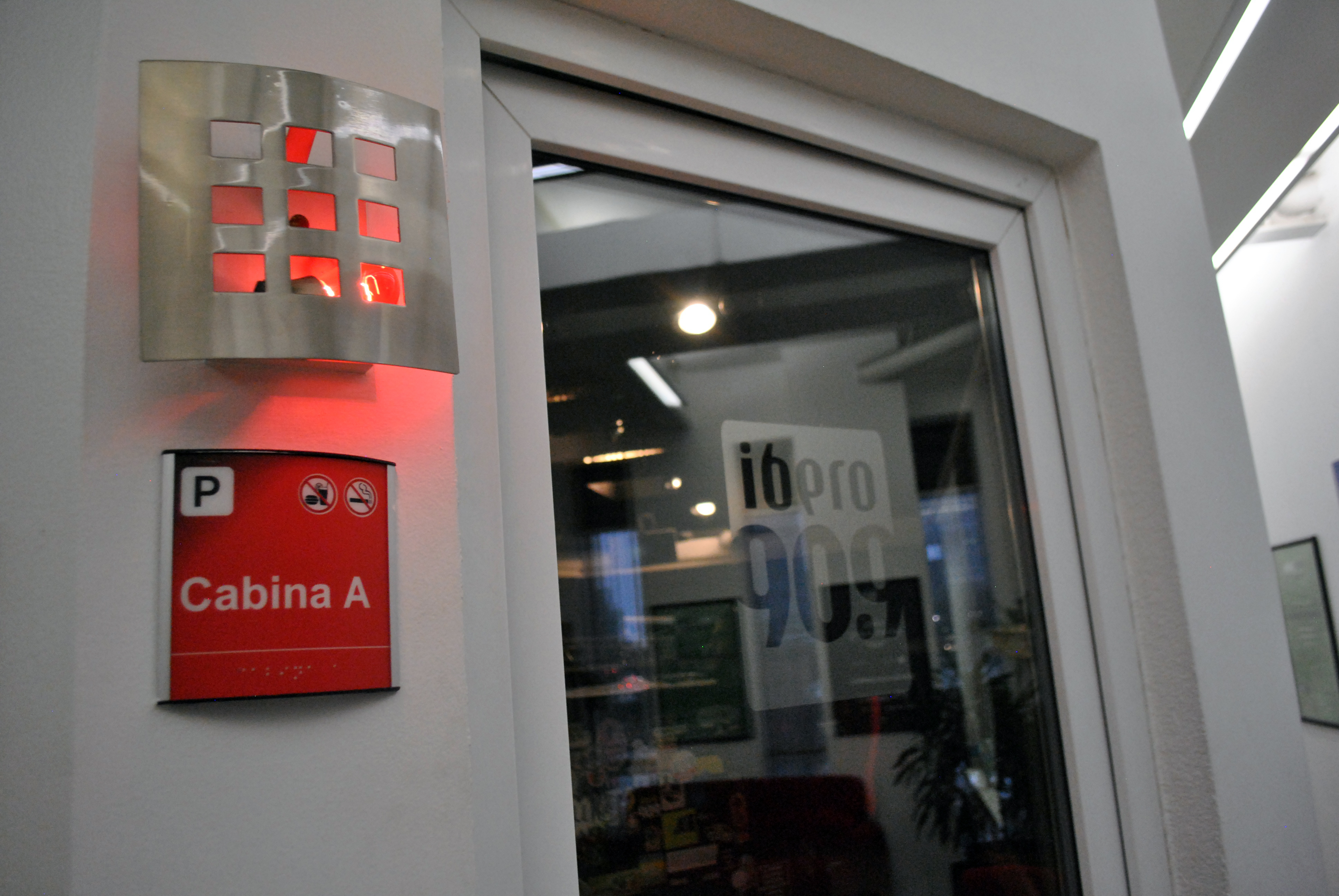
- Ibero 90.9 studios
- Mexico City; Mexico
- Broadcast area: Greater Mexico City
- Frequency: 90.9 MHz (HD Radio)
- Branding: Ibero 90.9

Programming
- Format: College radio, Alternative Rock music in English and Spanish, Talk programs

Ownership
- Owner: Universidad Iberoamericana; (Radio Ibero, A.C.)

History
- First air date: 1991; 35 years ago
- Former call signs: XHUIB-FM (July 24, 1991–July 23, 1996)
- Call sign meaning: "Universidad Iberoamericana"

Technical information
- Licensing authority: CRT
- Class: B1
- ERP: 10 kW
- HAAT: 6.5 metres (21 ft)
- Transmitter coordinates: 19°22′04.7″N 99°15′53.4″W

Links
- Website: https://ibero909.fm/

XHUIA-FM (90.9 MHz), known as Ibero 90.9, is the radio station of the Universidad Iberoamericana in Mexico City. Owned by the Universidad Iberoamericana through licensee Radio Ibero, A.C., XHUIA-FM carries a college radio format under the name "Ibero 90.9". It airs a mix of alternative rock, reggaeton and other genres of music in Spanish and English, along with talk programs. The transmitter is located on the university's Santa Fe campus and broadcasts with an effective radiated power (ERP) of 10,000 watts. XHUIA-FM broadcasts using HD Radio technology. It carries two subchannels, known as Ibero 90.9.1 and Ibero 90.9.2.

== History ==
In the late 1980s, the university began to seek a construction permit for a new radio station primarily to be used for teaching purposes. The Secretariat of Communications and Transportation assigned a provisional permit for XHUIB-FM in 1991. It began broadcasting with 20 watts, a fraction of its current output.

The station grew in the 1990s; it received a power hike to 100 watts ERP by 1994. It was broadcasting 40 hours a week. In July 1996, the current XHUIA-FM call sign was adopted. The station was primarily programmed by students at the university; the programs and format were free form.

On September 25, 2001, the SCT authorized a power increase to 3 kW. The university also formalized the station's management (under a civil association) and updated the programming. This led to the station's relaunch as Radio Ibero on March 7, 2003.

In December 2018, the IFT approved an increase to 10 kW for the station, expanding service particularly in areas to the north and east of Mexico City.
