= KMDY =

Coordinates: 40°30′41″N 91°19′50″W

- Keokuk, Iowa; United States
- Broadcast area: Keokuk, Iowa; Fort Madison, Iowa; Carthage, Illinois
- Frequency: 90.9 MHz
- Branding: Lift FM

Programming
- Format: Christian radio

Ownership
- Owner: Sound in Spirit Broadcasting, Inc.

History
- First air date: 2001

Technical information
- Licensing authority: FCC
- Facility ID: 84893
- Class: B1
- ERP: 7,700 watts
- HAAT: 60 meters (200 ft)
- Translator: 89.7 W209CH (Quincy, IL)

Links
- Public license information: Public file; LMS
- Website: liftfmfamily.com

KMDY is a Christian radio station licensed to Keokuk, Iowa, broadcasting on 90.9 MHz. KMDY serves the areas of Keokuk, Iowa, Fort Madison, Iowa, and Carthage, Illinois. The station is owned by Sound in Spirit Broadcasting, Inc.

KMDY began broadcasting in 2001, and was owned by Moody Bible Institute, running 30 watts. In 2005, KMDY was purchased by Cornerstone Community Radio. In 2006, its power was increased to 7,700 watts.

Effective December 28, 2018, Cornerstone Community Radio sold KMDY and translator W209CH to Sound in Spirit Broadcasting, Inc. for $150,000.

== Translators ==
KMDY is also heard in Quincy, Illinois through a translator on 89.7 FM.

Call sign	Frequency	City of license	FID	ERP (W)	Class	FCC info
W209CH	89.7 FM	Quincy, Illinois	152831	5	D	LMS
