= XHRYA-FM =

- Reynosa, Tamaulipas; Mexico
- Broadcast area: McAllen–Reynosa
- Frequency: 90.9 FM
- Branding: Más Music

Programming
- Format: Contemporary hit radio (noncommercial)

Ownership
- Owner: Jorge Brenes; (Patronato Pro-Radio Cultural de Reynosa, A.C.)

History
- First air date: November 22, 1988 (permit)
- Call sign meaning: "Reynosa"

Technical information
- Licensing authority: CRT
- Class: A
- ERP: 1,970 watts
- HAAT: 35.04 m (115.0 ft)

Links
- Website: masmusic.fm

XHRYA-FM (branded as Más Music FM) is a noncommercial Spanish-language FM radio station that serves the McAllen, Texas (USA) / Reynosa, Tamaulipas (Mexico) border area.

== History ==
XHRYA was permitted on November 22, 1988. For the first 19 years of its life, until November 15, 2007, it was operated by the Universidad México Americana del Norte and known as Stereo América. It was a cultural station with a format of primarily instrumental music, as well as news, weather and traffic reports. In 2007, XHRYA was relaunched as Más Music, with a pop/rock format similar to other stations in the region.

Former logo
