= KSLU (FM) =

- Hammond, Louisiana; United States
- Broadcast area: Lake Pontchartrain area
- Frequency: 90.9 MHz (HD Radio)
- Branding: 90.9 The Lion

Programming
- Format: College radio; classic rock
- Affiliations: NPR

Ownership
- Owner: Southeastern Louisiana University

History
- First air date: November 11, 1974
- Call sign meaning: Southeastern Louisiana University

Technical information
- Licensing authority: FCC
- Facility ID: 61234
- Class: A
- ERP: 4,200 watts
- HAAT: 102.0 meters (334.6 ft)
- Transmitter coordinates: 30°32′29.7″N 90°29′3.7″W

Links
- Public license information: Public file; LMS
- Webcast: Listen live
- Website: lionupradio.org

KSLU (90.9 MHz) is an FM radio station broadcasting a classic rock format on the campus of Southeastern Louisiana University in Hammond, Louisiana, United States. The station is broadcast from studios inside Cardinal Newman Hall on the campus of SLU on West Dakota Street with a transmitter on North Morrison Boulevard, both in Hammond.

KSLU began broadcasting in 1974 and has provided a mix of campus-oriented and alternative public radio broadcasting to the Hammond area. In 2023, responsibility for the station was moved under the university's athletics department in support of the school's sports communication program.

== History ==
On December 14, 1973, Southeastern Louisiana University (SLU) applied to the Federal Communications Commission (FCC) for the construction permit to build a new 10-watt educational radio station on the campus. The FCC granted this permit on May 21, 1974, and KSLU began broadcasting on November 11, 1974, from studios in the Humanities Building. In the early 1980s, Robin Roberts—later of ESPN and Good Morning America—was a special assignment reporter for KSLU while a student at the university. The station began airing public radio programming in 1982, providing the format for the first time in the Hammond and Tangipahoa Parish area. KSLU increased its power to 3,000 watts in 1984 and increased its coverage of SLU athletics.

Previous logo

In 2021, the university began a renovation of D Vickers Hall, presenting logistical concerns for the future of the station. However, after Hurricane Ida in 2022, the station was knocked off air as the facility sustained substantial damage; streaming was resumed from studios in Cardinal Newman Hall. In Ida's wake, the station manager successfully campaigned for the station to be transferred to the university's athletic department in support of a recently established sports communication major. KSLU resumed broadcasting at reduced power of 600 watts on May 4, 2023. The renovated D Vickers Hall will contain a new broadcast and media center. Ground was broken for the new facility, to be named for Roberts, in November 2023. That same month, after stunting for 39 hours with "Never Gonna Give You Up" by Rick Astley, the station shifted to a classic rock-based music format emphasizing the 1980s and 1990s.

== Funding ==
In fiscal year 2022, KSLU was predominantly funded by the university, by way of contributions and student fees, and by grants from the Corporation for Public Broadcasting. The latter provides funds for the purchase of syndicated programming from various public radio distributors as well as support the station's local news reporting and a weekly community affairs program.
