= KSHI =

- Zuni, New Mexico; United States
- Frequency: 90.9 MHz

Programming
- Format: Variety

Ownership
- Owner: Zuni Communications Authority

Technical information
- Licensing authority: FCC
- Facility ID: 74600
- Class: A
- ERP: 100 watts
- HAAT: -76 meters (-249 feet)
- Transmitter coordinates: 35°05′18″N 108°47′22″W

Links
- Public license information: Public file; LMS
- Website: KSHI website

KSHI (90.9 FM) is a radio station licensed to serve Zuni, New Mexico. The station is owned by Zuni Communications Authority. It airs a Variety radio format.

The station was assigned the KSHI call letters by the Federal Communications Commission. The pronunciation of the call letters is the same as the Zuni word for "hello."
