= CIAL-FM =

Radio station in London, Ontario

Coordinates: 43°00′40.5″N 81°15′52.8″W

- London, Ontario; Canada
- Broadcast area: Southwestern Ontario
- Frequency: 90.9 MHz
- Branding: CIAL FM 90.9

Programming
- Format: Multilingual

Ownership
- Owner: Malayalam Community Radio Inc. Founder - Aneesh Joseph

History
- First air date: 2025

Technical information
- Licensing authority: CRTC
- Class: Low-power
- ERP: 50 watts
- HAAT: 45.2 metres (148 ft)

Links
- Website: mcradio.ca, https://cialfm.ca

CIAL-FM (90.9 MHz) is a low-power Canadian radio station in London, Ontario. Owned by Malayalam Community Radio Inc. The station airs a multilingual format aimed at the South Asian community. CIAL's studios are located at 379 Dundas Street in Downtown London, while its transmitter is located at the top of the Somerset Place off Richmond Street in North London.

CIAL operates at low-power to avoid interference with WRCJ-FM (Detroit, Michigan) and CBL-FM-2 (a rebroadcaster of CBL-FM Toronto located Paris, Ontario).

== History ==
On January 16, 2023, the CRTC approved Malayalam Community Radio's application to operate a multilingual radio station in London.

In 2019, Aneesh Joseph launched an initiative to secure an FM licence for CIAL FM 90.9 in London, Ontario. As the founder, he established CIAL FM 90.9 as Canada's first Malayali community-owned FM radio station, serving as a cultural hub for the South asian diaspora. Tomy Kokkat, Aneesh Joseph, Archana Prathap, and Manoj Mammen are the current Directors.
