= KWRB =

Radio station in Bisbee, Arizona

- Bisbee, Arizona; United States
- Broadcast area: Cochise County, Arizona and Northern Sonora Mexico
- Frequency: 90.9 MHz

Programming
- Format: Contemporary Christian Music

Ownership
- Owner: World Radio Network, Inc.

Technical information
- Licensing authority: FCC
- Facility ID: 73754
- Class: C2
- ERP: 990 watts
- HAAT: 638.0 meters (2,093.2 ft)
- Transmitter coordinates: 31°28′54″N 109°57′35″W

Links
- Public license information: Public file; LMS
- Webcast: Listen Online
- Website: www.kwrb.org

KWRB (90.9 FM) is a radio station licensed to Bisbee, Arizona and serves Cochise County Arizona and Northern Sonora Mexico. The station airs a Contemporary Christian music format and is owned by World Radio Network, Inc.

KWRB also airs Christian Talk and Teaching programs including; Insight For Living with Charles Swindoll, Turning Point with David Jeremiah, In Touch with Dr. Charles Stanley, and Focus on the Family.

They also have a repeating station for the Wilcox, Arizona area, with the callsign of K274CB on the 102.7 MHz frequency.
