= WSCS =

- New London, New Hampshire; United States
- Broadcast area: New London, New Hampshire; Andover, New Hampshire; Lake Sunapee Region
- Frequency: 90.9 MHz
- Branding: Classical 90.9 WSCS

Programming
- Format: Classical

Ownership
- Owner: (Sugar River Foundation, Inc.)

History
- First air date: February 1996
- Call sign meaning: Colby-Sawyer College (former owner)

Technical information
- Licensing authority: FCC
- Facility ID: 12228
- Class: A
- ERP: 63 watts (horiz.); 250 watts (vert.)
- HAAT: 91 meters (299 ft)
- Transmitter coordinates: 43°24′41.2″N 71°58′31.3″W

Links
- Public license information: Public file; LMS
- Webcast: Listen live
- Website: www.classicalwscs.org

WSCS is a classical formatted broadcast radio station. The station is licensed to New London, New Hampshire, United States, and serves New London, Andover and the Lake Sunapee Region in New Hampshire. WSCS is owned and operated by Sugar River Foundation, Inc., a not for profit 501(c)3 tax exempt organization.

== History ==
WSCS was formerly owned by Colby-Sawyer College, WSCS was sold to the Vinikoor Family Foundation, Inc. on September 1, 2014, for $4,000. At the time, Bob Vinikoor owned Koor Communications, Inc, a commercial broadcasting company that operated several radio stations in the upper Connecticut River valley. As part of a deal announced October 5, 2016, The Vinikoor Family Foundation sold WSCS to Sugar River Foundation, Inc. for $10,000. Sugar River Foundation is controlled by Robert and John Landry, who are the owners of Sugar River Media, LLC.
