= XHJAP-FM =

Radio station in Villahermosa, Tabasco

Villahermosa, Tabasco; Mexico
- Frequency: 90.9 MHz
- Branding: Tabasco Hoy Radio

Programming
- Format: News

Ownership
- Owner: Grupo Cantón; (Grupo Cantón Radio, S.A. de C.V.)
- Sister stations: XHEMZ-FM, XHRTM-FM

History
- First air date: November 17, 1992 (concession)
- Call sign meaning: Jalapa, to which this station was originally allotted

Technical information
- ERP: 100 kW

Links
- Website: tabascohoy.com

XHJAP-FM is a radio station in Villahermosa, Tabasco, Mexico. Broadcasting on 90.9 FM, XHJAP is owned by Grupo Cantón and is known as Tabasco Hoy Radio. It is co-owned with the Tabasco Hoy newspaper.

== History ==
The station's concession was awarded in 1992. Until 2014, the station was known as Conexión 90.9, later becoming Tabasco Hoy Radio. That name is still used for the station during newscasts.
