= XHCUA-FM =

Radio station of the Universidad Autónoma de Campeche

- Campeche, Campeche, Mexico; Mexico
- Broadcast area: Campeche
- Frequency: 90.9 MHz
- Branding: Radio Universidad

Programming
- Format: Mexican college

Ownership
- Owner: Universidad Autónoma de Campeche

History
- First air date: May 13, 1993
- Call sign meaning: Campeche Universidad Autónoma

Technical information
- Class: B1
- ERP: 10 kW
- HAAT: 80.7 m
- Transmitter coordinates: 19°49′54″N 90°30′58″W

Links
- Webcast: Radio Universidad

XHCUA-FM is a Mexican college radio station owned by the Universidad Autónoma de Campeche.

== History ==
XECUA-AM 1410 came to air on May 13, 1993. It was the successor to XECUC-AM 840 "Radio Casa de la Cultura", a state-run radio station dating to 1981 whose failing equipment and economic problems caused then-governor Jorge Salomón Azar to declare that it "was not meeting the objective for which it had been created". The university had long sought to operate a cultural radio station. In 2000, power was upgraded from 500 to 1,000 watts. During Hurricane Isidore in 2002, XECUA was the only station to remain on the air; after the disaster, Radio Universidad expanded its facilities in order to be able to sustain service during emergencies.

The university radio station migrated to FM in 2012 as XHCUA-FM 90.9, though FM tests had begun as early as 2007. On March 20, 2015, the Universidad Autónoma de Campeche formally surrendered its permit for the AM station, citing the costs of maintaining two radio services, a desire to focus on FM and the breakdown of its AM transmitter in August 2014; the university proceeded with the dismantling of the AM facility in September 2014. In October 2017, the IFT approved a power increase from 2.67 to 10 kW for XHCUA-FM.
