= WNKJ =

Coordinates: 36°48′34″N 87°24′20″W

- Hopkinsville, Kentucky; United States
- Broadcast area: Hopkinsville, Kentucky; Clarksville, Tennessee
- Frequency: 89.3 MHz
- Branding: Missionary Radio

Programming
- Format: Christian radio

Ownership
- Owner: Pennyrile Christian Community, Inc.

History
- First air date: August 3, 1981

Technical information
- Licensing authority: FCC
- Facility ID: 52223
- Class: C3
- ERP: 12,000 watts
- HAAT: 101 meters (331 ft)

Links
- Public license information: Public file; LMS
- Webcast: Listen live
- Website: wnkj.org

WNKJ is a Christian radio station licensed to Hopkinsville, Kentucky, broadcasting on 89.3 FM. The station serves the areas of Hopkinsville, Kentucky, and Clarksville, Tennessee, and is owned by Pennyrile Christian Community, Inc.

== History ==
The station began operations on August 3, 1981. The station's programming schedule was expanded to a 24/7 schedule in 1987 when the station joined Moody Radio Network.

== Programming ==
WNKJ's programming includes Christian talk and teaching shows such as Truth for Life with Alistair Begg, Insight for Living with Chuck Swindoll, Turning Point with David Jeremiah, Revive our Hearts with Nancy Leigh DeMoss, Back to Genesis by the Institute for Creation Research, The Alternative with Tony Evans, Focus on the Family, and Unshackled!

== Rebroadcasters ==
WNKJ is simulcast on 91.7 WNLJ in Madisonville, Kentucky, as well as low powered translators on 92.1 in Murray, Kentucky, 98.9 in Dickson, Tennessee, and 101.7 in Providence, Kentucky.

=== Simulcast ===
Broadcast translator for WNKJ
Call sign	Frequency	City of license	FID	ERP (W)	HAAT	Class	FCC info
WNLJ	91.7 FM	Madisonville, Kentucky	92339	200	80 m (262 ft)	A	LMS

=== Translators ===
Broadcast translators for WNKJ
Call sign	Frequency	City of license	FID	ERP (W)	HAAT	Class	FCC info
W221AA	92.1 FM	Murray, Kentucky	141597	55	52.3 m (172 ft)	D	LMS
W255AP	98.9 FM	Dickson, Tennessee	52225	23	49.6 m (163 ft)	D	LMS
W269CD	101.7 FM	Providence, Kentucky	52224	38	74 m (243 ft)	D	LMS
