= KSJE =

- Farmington, New Mexico; United States
- Broadcast area: Four Corners
- Frequency: 90.9 MHz

Programming
- Format: Classical, Jazz
- Affiliations: Public Radio International

Ownership
- Owner: San Juan College

History
- First air date: 1988
- Call sign meaning: San Juan Educational

Technical information
- Licensing authority: FCC
- Facility ID: 58863
- Class: C3
- ERP: 15,000 watts
- HAAT: 119 meters (390 feet)
- Translators: K277CR (103.3 MHz, Durango, CO)

Links
- Public license information: Public file; LMS
- Webcast: Listen Live
- Website: ksje.com

KSJE (90.9 FM) is a non-commercial radio station licensed to serve Farmington, New Mexico, United States. The station is owned by San Juan College. In addition to its conventional broadcast signal, local programming on KSJE is also available live as streaming audio and recorded as a downloadable podcast.

KSJE is a member of the New Mexico Broadcasters Association. It broadcasts mostly classical music and jazz music formats and features programming from American Public Media.

== History ==
This station received its original construction permit from the Federal Communications Commission on April 18, 1988. The new station was assigned the call letters KSJE by the FCC on June 8, 1988. After receiving an extension to its original permit, KSJE received its license to cover from the FCC on December 9, 1992.

== Honors and awards ==
In April 2001, Constance Gotsch and KSJE received the first place award for "Best Interview or Talk Show" from the New Mexico Press Women, an affiliate of the National Federation of Press Women, at their annual conference in Gallup, New Mexico.
