= KSWP =

- Lufkin, Texas; United States
- Broadcast area: Lufkin-Nacogdoches
- Frequency: 90.9 MHz

Programming
- Format: Contemporary Christian
- Affiliations: Salem Communications, USA Radio Network

Ownership
- Owner: LEBF, Inc., Lufkin Educational Broadcasting Foundation.

Technical information
- Licensing authority: FCC
- Facility ID: 39168
- Class: C1
- ERP: 100,000 watts
- HAAT: 246.0 meters (807.1 ft)
- Transmitter coordinates: 31°22′8.00″N 94°38′45.00″W

Links
- Public license information: Public file; LMS
- Webcast: Listen live
- Website: Official website

KSWP (90.9 FM) is a radio station broadcasting a Contemporary Christian music format. Licensed to Lufkin, Texas, United States, the station serves the Lufkin-Nacogdoches area. The station is currently owned by Lufkin Educational Broadcasting Foundation.

Former logo
