= List of Air1 stations =

The following is a list of full-power radio stations, HD Radio subchannels and low-power translators in the United States broadcasting Air1 programming, which can be sorted by their call signs, frequencies, city of license, state and broadcast area.

Blue background indicates a low-power FM translator.
Gray background indicates an HD Radio subchannel.

Call sign	Frequency	City of license	State	Broadcast area
WZZK-FM-HD2	104.7-2	Birmingham	Alabama	Birmingham
W271BN	102.1	Birmingham	Alabama	Birmingham
WHVK-HD2	103.5-2	New Hope	Alabama	Huntsville
WFMA	102.9	Marion	Alabama	Tuscaloosa
KYKA	104.9	Meadow Lakes	Alaska	Anchorage
K220IV	91.9	North Pole	Alaska	Fairbanks
KAKI	88.1	Juneau	Alaska	Juneau
K214FG	90.7	Casa Grande	Arizona	Casa Grande
KOWI	101.3	Oatman	Arizona	Kingman
KAIZ	105.5	Avondale	Arizona	Phoenix
KLTU-HD2	88.1-2	Mammoth	Arizona	Tucson
K243CC	96.5	Tucson	Arizona	Tucson
K210EU	89.9	Tucson	Arizona	Tucson
KRQA	88.1	Bentonville	Arkansas	Bentonville
K279BT	103.7	Blytheville	Arkansas	Blytheville
KKRI	88.1	Pocola, OK	Arkansas	Fort Smith
KARH	104.3	Fouke	Arkansas	Fouke
KALR	91.5	Hot Springs	Arkansas	Hot Springs
KJBR	93.7	Marked Tree	Arkansas	Jonesboro
K241AP	96.1	Ferndale	Arkansas	Little Rock
KOAR	101.5	Beebe	Arkansas	Searcy
KYZA	92.7	Adelanto	California	Adelanto
KAIA	95.9	Greater Los Angeles	California	Greater Los Angeles
KAIB	89.5	Shafter	California	Bakersfield
K285GG	104.9	Edison	California	Bakersfield
K284AO	104.7	Oildale	California	Bakersfield
K221GB	92.1	Barstow	California	Barstow
KYIX	104.9	South Oroville	California	Chico
KYLA	92.7	Fountain Valley	California	Fountain Valley
KAWF	88.5	Selma	California	Fresno
KHRI	90.7	Hollister	California	Hollister
K228KB	93.5	Tahoe Vista	California	Kings Beach
K216EM	91.1	Arcadia	California	La Cañada Flintridge
KTLW	88.9	Lancaster	California	Lancaster
K225AO	92.9	Lompoc	California	Lompoc
KKLQ-HD2	100.3-2	Los Angeles	California	Los Angeles
KAWJ	94.5	Coarsegold	California	Madera
K264AL	100.7	Merced	California	Merced
K270BE	101.9	Modesto	California	Modesto
KARW	97.9	Salinas	California	Monterey–Salinas
K264AF	100.7	Ontario	California	Ontario
KHCS	91.7	Palm Desert	California	Palm Springs
K289AZ	105.7	Porterville	California	Porterville
KKRO	102.7	Red Bluff	California	Redding
K211CO	90.1	Redding	California	Redding
KYUA	88.5	Inyokern	California	Ridgecrest
K255CL	98.9	Clarksville	California	Sacramento
KSAI	99.5	Citrus Heights	California	Sacramento
KARA	99.1	Williams	California	Sacramento
KLRD	90.1	Yucaipa	California	San Bernardino
KYDO	96.1	Campo	California	San Diego
KARJ	92.1	Escondido	California	San Diego
KLVS-HD2	107.3-2	Livermore	California	San Francisco
K277CH	103.3	San Francisco	California	San Francisco
KWAI	97.7	Los Altos	California	San Jose
K205BN	88.9	Los Gatos	California	San Jose
KBKF-LD	87.7	San Jose	California	San Jose
K281BL	104.1	Coyote	California	San Jose
KARQ	88.5	San Luis Obispo	California	San Luis Obispo
KLSB-HD2	97.5-2	Goleta	California	Santa Barbara
K280FV	103.9	Santa Barbara	California	Santa Barbara
K205EP	88.9	Santa Clarita	California	Santa Clarita
KBBL	106.3	Cazadero	California	Santa Rosa
K220FR	91.9	Simi Valley	California	Simi Valley
KCAI	89.3	Linden	California	Stockton
K220HC	91.9	Studio City	California	Studio City
KAIV	92.7	Thousand Oaks	California	Thousand Oaks
KLDV-HD2	91.1-2	Morrison	Colorado	Denver
K205FV	88.9	Plainview	Colorado	Denver
K215EM	90.9	Eagle	Colorado	Eagle
K233CH	94.5	Greeley	Colorado	Greeley
KRKA	103.9	Severance	Colorado	Fort Collins
KAAI	98.5	Palisade	Colorado	Grand Junction
KHCO	90.1	Hayden	Colorado	Steamboat Springs
KSRI	90.7	Sterling	Colorado	Sterling
WASH-HD2	97.1-2	Washington	District of Columbia	Washington, D.C.
W204BU	88.7	Gainesville	Florida	Gainesville
W208AV	89.5	San Jose	Florida	Jacksonville
WJKV-HD2	90.9-2	Jacksonville	Florida	Jacksonville
WXRA	99.3	Inglis	Florida	Ocala
WFLV-HD2	90.7-2	West Palm Beach	Florida	West Palm Beach
W284CK	104.7	West Palm Beach	Florida	West Palm Beach
WAIA	104.7	Athens	Georgia	Atlanta
WAKL-HD2	106.7-2	Gainesville	Georgia	Atlanta
WQAI	89.5	Thomson	Georgia	Augusta
WLXP	88.1	Savannah	Georgia	Savannah
WAWS	107.3	Claxton	Georgia	Statesboro
KLUU-HD2	103.5-2	Wahiawa	Hawaii	Honolulu
K288FB	105.5	Honolulu	Hawaii	Honolulu
KARO	98.7	Nyssa	Idaho	Boise
K298BQ	107.5	Coeur D'Alene	Idaho	Coeur D'Alene
KAIO	90.5	Idaho Falls	Idaho	Idaho Falls
K210DT	89.9	Pocatello	Idaho	Pocatello
W202CF	88.3	Champaign	Illinois	Champaign
WAWE	94.3	Glendale Heights	Illinois	Chicago
WAWY	103.9	Dundee	Illinois	Chicago
WCKL-HD2	97.9-2	Chicago	Illinois	Chicago
W203BD	88.5	Decatur	Illinois	Decatur
W272CB	102.3	Long Creek	Illinois	Decatur
W287AU	105.3	DeKalb	Illinois	DeKalb
WQFL	100.9	Rockford	Illinois	Rockford
WSRI	88.7	Sugar Grove	Illinois	Sugar Grove
W203BL	88.5	Kirksville	Indiana	Bloomington
W276BF	103.1	Bloomington	Indiana	Bloomington
WQME	98.7	Anderson	Indiana	Indianapolis
WQRA	90.5	Greencastle	Indiana	Indianapolis
WARA-FM	88.3	New Washington	Indiana	New Washington
K209FW	89.7	Ames	Iowa	Ames
KXGM	89.1	Hiawatha	Iowa	Cedar Rapids
K249DO	97.7	Clinton	Iowa	Clinton
K281DH	100.1	Iowa City	Iowa	Iowa City
K248CE	97.5	Davenport	Iowa	Quad Cities
K250BU	97.9	Bettendorf	Iowa	Quad Cities
KAIP	88.9	Wapello	Iowa	Quad Cities
K217FT	91.3	Waterloo	Iowa	Waterloo
K265EH	100.9	Waverly	Iowa	Waverly
KAIG	89.9	Dodge City	Kansas	Dodge City
K217EN	91.3	Great Bend	Kansas	Great Bend
K221DW	92.1	Tecumseh	Kansas	Topeka
K215DM	90.9	Hoyt	Kansas	Topeka
K277CU	103.3	Wichita	Kansas	Wichita
K218DK	91.5	Bel Aire	Kansas	Wichita
WLJC	102.1	Beattyville	Kentucky	Beattyville
WLAI	107.1	Wilmore	Kentucky	Lexington
KYAI	89.3	McKee	Kentucky	London
KRVE-HD3	96.1-3	Brusly	Louisiana	Baton Rouge
W266CD	101.1	Baton Rouge	Louisiana	Baton Rouge
K246CK	97.1	Lake Charles	Louisiana	Lake Charles
KITA	89.5	Iota	Louisiana	Lake Charles–Lafayette
K221GT	92.1	Ruston	Louisiana	Ruston
KYXA	106.7	Homer	Louisiana	Shreveport
K272EI	102.3	Sulphur	Louisiana	Sulphur
WKVB-HD2	107.3-2	Westborough	Massachusetts	Boston
W260AS	99.9	Lawrence	Massachusetts	Lawrence/Haverhill Massachusetts
WRWX	91.1	Winchendon	Massachusetts	Winchendon
WARX	93.9	Lewiston	Maine	Lewiston
WDKL-HD2	102.7-2	Mount Clemens	Michigan	Detroit
W296CG	107.1	Detroit	Michigan	Detroit
W292DK	106.3	Westland	Michigan	Detroit
W295BP	106.9	Haslett	Michigan	Lansing
WITL-FM-HD3	100.7-3	Lansing	Michigan	Lansing
W215CH	90.9	Grand Ledge	Michigan	Lansing
W240CG	95.9	Webberville	Michigan	Lansing
W228DE	93.5	New Baltimore	Michigan	New Baltimore
W288BK	105.5	Rochester Hills	Michigan	Rochester Hills
WTRK	90.9	Freeland	Michigan	Saginaw
K221ES	92.1	Albertville	Minnesota	Albertville
W225AP	92.9	Saint Paul	Minnesota	Minneapolis
K208DV	89.5	Saint Cloud	Minnesota	Saint Cloud
KMWA	96.3	Edina	Minnesota	Minneapolis–St. Paul
WJAI	93.9	Pearl	Mississippi	Jackson
WIVG	96.1	Tunica	Mississippi	Memphis
KBAI	91.5	Bloomfield	Missouri	Bloomfield
KCFX-HD3	101.1-3	Harrisonville	Missouri	Kansas City
K300CH	107.9	Lee's Summit	Missouri	Kansas City
KSRD	91.9	Saint Joseph	Missouri	Saint Joseph
KBIL	89.7	Park City	Montana	Billings
K219KM	91.7	Butte	Montana	Butte
KGFA	90.7	Great Falls	Montana	Great Falls
KFLF	91.3	Somers	Montana	Kalispell
KYMI	97.5	Charlo	Montana	Missoula
K211FN	90.1	Norfolk	Nebraska	Norfolk
KGOR-HD3	99.9-3	Omaha	Nebraska	Omaha
K285GP	104.9	Millard	Nebraska	Omaha
KIMI	107.7	Malvern	Nebraska	Omaha
KDAI	89.1	Scottsbluff	Nebraska	Scottsbluff
K215FJ	90.9	Carson City	Nevada	Carson City
K234BS	94.7	Las Vegas	Nevada	Las Vegas
KAER	89.3	Mesquite	Nevada	Mesquite
K253BH	98.5	Gardnerville	Nevada	Minden–Gardnerville
KYSA	88.3	Sparks	Nevada	Reno
WNHI	106.5	Farmington	New Hampshire	Farmington
WYPA	89.5	Cherry Hill	New Jersey	Philadelphia
WKVP-HD2	106.9-2	Camden	New Jersey	Philadelphia
KQRI	105.5	Bosque Farms	New Mexico	Albuquerque
K207CZ	89.3	Carlsbad	New Mexico	Carlsbad
K283BC	104.5	Hobbs	New Mexico	Hobbs
K217FA	91.3	Portales	New Mexico	Portales
KQAI	89.1	Roswell	New Mexico	Roswell
WYAI	93.7	Scotia	New York (state)	Albany
WMWA	96.5	Malone	New York (state)	Montreal–Cornwall (Canada); Franklin County
W282BI	104.3	Catskill	New York (state)	Coxsackie
WAIV	91.7	Kingston	New York (state)	Kingston
WARW	96.7	Port Chester	New York (state)	New York City
WPLJ-HD2	95.5-3	New York City	New York (state)	New York City
W206AQ	89.1	Plattsburgh	New York (state)	Plattsburgh
WAWR	93.5	Remsen	New York (state)	Rome
W267AZ	101.3	Syracuse	New York (state)	Syracuse
WSYR-FM-HD3	106.9-3	Solvay	New York (state)	Syracuse
W262BM	100.3	Charlotte	North Carolina	Charlotte
WHQC-HD2	96.1-2	Shelby	North Carolina	Charlotte
WRCM-HD2	91.9-2	Wingate	North Carolina	Charlotte
WGTI	97.7	Winfall	North Carolina	Elizabeth City–Hampton Roads
WKFV-HD2	107.3-2	Clinton	North Carolina	Fayetteville
W275BW	102.9	Fayetteville	North Carolina	Fayetteville
WZRI	89.3	Spring Lake	North Carolina	Fayetteville
W224CO	92.7	Greensboro	North Carolina	Greensboro
WWLV-HD2	94.1-2	Lexington	North Carolina	Greensboro–High Point–Winston-Salem
W296CV	107.1	High Point	North Carolina	High Point
WBKZ	105.1	Morehead City	North Carolina	Morehead City–New Bern
W260BG	99.9	Lexington	North Carolina	Piedmont Triad
W291DD	106.1	Lexington	North Carolina	Piedmont Triad
W249BX	97.7	Southern Pines	North Carolina	Southern Pines
W205CP	88.9	Winston-Salem	North Carolina	Winston-Salem
KNRI	89.7	Bismarck	North Dakota	Bismarck
KFAA	89.5	Horace	North Dakota	Fargo
K220GC	91.9	Minot	North Dakota	Minot
W273BL	102.5	Akron	Ohio	Akron
WKDD-HD2	98.1-2	Munroe Falls	Ohio	Akron–Cleveland
WOHC	90.1	Chillicothe	Ohio	Chillicothe
WKFS-HD3	107.1-3	Milford	Ohio	Cincinnati
WORI	90.1	Harrison	Ohio	Cincinnati
W245AJ	96.9	Forest Park	Ohio	Cincinnati
W279BT	103.7	Cleveland	Ohio	Cleveland
W224CD	92.7	Parma	Ohio	Cleveland
W257CU	99.3	Columbus	Ohio	Columbus
WODC-HD3	93.3-3	Ashville	Ohio	Columbus
WYDA	96.9	Troy	Ohio	Dayton
W246CQ	97.1	Dayton	Ohio	Dayton
W238BJ	95.5	Auburn	Ohio	Hamilton
WCVJ	90.9	Jefferson	Ohio	Jefferson
W287CL	105.3	Lancaster	Ohio	Lancaster
WOAR	88.3	South Vienna	Ohio	South Vienna
KKRD	91.1	Enid	Oklahoma	Enid
K264AJ	100.7	Lawton	Oklahoma	Lawton
KARU	88.9	Cache	Oklahoma	Lawton
K285FI	104.9	Muskogee	Oklahoma	Muskogee
KOKF	90.9	Edmond	Oklahoma	Oklahoma City
K263AM	100.5	Tahlequah	Oklahoma	Tahlequah
KTUA	88.1	Coweta	Oklahoma	Tulsa
KVRA	89.3	Sisters	Oregon	Bend
K214CI	90.7	Eugene	Oregon	Eugene
K212BF	90.3	Eugene	Oregon	Eugene
KYSF	97.5	Bonanza	Oregon	Klamath Falls
K218EX	91.5	Klamath Falls	Oregon	Klamath Falls
KGRI	88.1	Lebanon	Oregon	Lebanon
KYSO	88.7	Selma	Oregon	Medford
K224DL	92.7	Portland	Oregon	Newberg
K248BS	97.5	Newberg	Oregon	Newberg
KLVP-HD2	97.9-2	Aloha	Oregon	Portland
KPOZ	104.1	Portland	Oregon	Scappoose
KRNZ	88.7	Sandy	Oregon	Portland
KAIS	90.3	Salem	Oregon	Salem
KAIK	88.5	Rockaway Beach	Oregon	Tillamook
W269AS	101.7	Carlisle	Pennsylvania	Harrisburg
WHKF-HD2	99.3-2	Harrisburg	Pennsylvania	Harrisburg
WPAI	90.7	Nanty Glo	Pennsylvania	Johnstown
WROZ	101.3	Lancaster	Pennsylvania	Lancaster
W204CT	88.7	Pittsburgh	Pennsylvania	Pittsburgh
WPKV-HD2	98.3-2	Duquesne	Pennsylvania	Pittsburgh
WYRA	98.5	Confluence	Pennsylvania	Somerset
WNLI	94.5	State College	Pennsylvania	State College
WLTE	95.5	Powdersville	South Carolina	Anderson
WMHK-HD2	89.7-2	Columbia	South Carolina	Columbia
W219CY	91.7	Irmo	South Carolina	Columbia
WLTS	103.3	Greer	South Carolina	Greenville–Spartanburg
W211BG	90.1	Walden	Tennessee	Chattanooga
WSAA	93.1	Benton	Tennessee	Cleveland
W292ED	106.3	Franklin	Tennessee	Franklin
W262CN	100.3	Hendersonville	Tennessee	Hendersonville
WOFM	89.1	Alcoa	Tennessee	Knoxville
WKVF-HD2	94.9-2	Bartlett	Tennessee	Memphis
W244BY	96.7	Memphis	Tennessee	Memphis
WLVU-HD2	97.1-2	Belle Meade	Tennessee	Nashville
W223BV	92.5	Brentwood	Tennessee	Nashville
WTAI	88.9	Union City	Tennessee	Union City
KAGT	90.5	Abilene	Texas	Abilene
KXRI	91.9	Amarillo	Texas	Amarillo
K225CA	92.9	Del Valle	Texas	Austin
KVLR	92.5	Sunset Valley	Texas	Austin
KYLR	92.1	Hutto	Texas	Round Rock–Georgetown
K241BO	96.1	Belton	Texas	Belton
K237FS	95.3	Conroe	Texas	Conroe
KYDA	101.7	Azle	Texas	Dallas–Fort Worth
KHJK	103.7	La Porte	Texas	Houston
K271AS	102.1	Killeen	Texas	Killeen
KPGA	91.9	Morton	Texas	Lubbock
KFRI	88.7	West Odessa	Texas	Midland–Odessa
K209BT	89.7	Plainview	Texas	Plainview
KNAR	89.3	San Angelo	Texas	San Angelo
KZAI	103.7	Balcones Heights	Texas	San Antonio
KZAR	97.7	McQueeney	Texas	San Antonio
K237EY	95.3	Temple	Texas	Temple
K224EH	92.7	Victoria	Texas	Victoria
KWAA	88.9	Mart	Texas	Waco
K263AK	100.5	Wichita Falls	Texas	Wichita Falls
K231CD	94.1	Smithfield	Utah	Logan
K209CJ	89.7	Tooele	Utah	Salt Lake City
KUAO	88.7	North Ogden	Utah	Salt Lake City
WGLY-FM-HD2	91.5-2	Bolton	Vermont	Burlington
W235BE	94.9	Burlington	Vermont	Burlington
W252CJ	98.3	Burlington	Vermont	Burlington
WAVJ	103.3	Waterbury	Vermont	Burlington
WCMD-FM-HD2	89.9-2	Barre	Vermont	Montpelier
W295BR	106.5	Montpelier	Vermont	Montpelier
WFTF	90.9	Rutland	Vermont	Rutland
WAWX	101.7	Lynchburg	Virginia	Lynchburg
WARV-FM	90.1	Colonial Heights	Virginia	Petersburg
WAIW	92.5	Winchester	Virginia	Washingtion, D.C.
KAKP	101.3	Pasco	Washington	Pasco, Richland, Kennewick (Tri-Cities)
KTSL	101.9	Medical Lake	Washington	Spokane
KWAO	88.1	Vashon	Washington	Tacoma
K201DX	88.1	Walla Walla	Washington	Walla Walla
K210CX	89.9	Yakima	Washington	Yakima
W205CG	88.9	Charleston	West Virginia	Charleston
WSHA	89.3	South Charleston	West Virginia	Charleston
WYXA	90.1	Clarksburg	West Virginia	Clarksburg
WCDE	89.9	Elkins	West Virginia	Elkins
W248BF	97.5	Granville	West Virginia	Morgantown
WZEE-HD3	104.1-3	Madison	Wisconsin	Madison
W203BX	88.5	Sheboygan	Wisconsin	Sheboygan
KAIX	88.3	Casper	Wyoming	Casper
K281DD	104.1	Cheyenne	Wyoming	Cheyenne
K206EO	89.1	Granite	Wyoming	Cheyenne
KAWR	98.7	Reliance	Wyoming	Rock Springs
