= KBDG =

Coordinates: 37.517°N 120.870°W

- Turlock, California; United States
- Frequency: 90.9 MHz

Programming
- Format: Middle Eastern music

Ownership
- Owner: Assyrian American Civic Club of Turlock, Inc.

History
- First air date: October 4, 1976
- Call sign meaning: "Bulldogs", as in the mascot of former owner Turlock High School

Technical information
- Licensing authority: FCC
- Facility ID: 3051
- Class: A
- ERP: 730 watts
- HAAT: 12.0 meters

Links
- Public license information: Public file; LMS
- Website: assyrianradio.org

KBDG (90.9 FM) is a radio station in Turlock, California, United States. It is owned by the Assyrian American Civic Club of Turlock, Inc., and broadcasts a variety of Middle Eastern music, concentrating on Assyrian music.

It has been operated by the Assyrian American Club since 1993; the club purchased it from original owner Turlock High School, which operated it as a training program and class for high school students.

== History ==
Turlock High School obtained the permit for a new 10-watt educational radio station in town on December 19, 1975. It began operation on October 4, 1976. After 17 years, the high school sold the station off in 1993, with faculty advisor Bob Hoskins noting the school was more interested in starting a television production program. The Assyrian American Club bought the station for $17,000, fending off a rival bid from KADV (90.5 FM) in Modesto.
