= CFVZ-FM =

Radio station in Moose Jaw, Saskatchewan, Canada

- Moose Jaw, Saskatchewan; Canada
- Frequency: 90.9 MHz (FM)

Programming
- Format: Sports

Ownership
- Owner: Moose Jaw Tier 1 Hockey Inc.

History
- First air date: January 21, 2005

Technical information
- Licensing authority: CRTC
- ERP: 28 watts
- HAAT: 17.6 metres (58 ft)
- Transmitter coordinates: 50°24′53″N 105°32′11″W

CFVZ-FM is a Canadian radio station that broadcasts a sports format at 90.9 FM in Moose Jaw, Saskatchewan.

CFVZ is owned and operated by Moose Jaw Tier 1 Hockey. The station broadcasts the Moose Jaw Warriors hockey games.
