= KPOD-FM =

- Crescent City, California; United States
- Broadcast area: Crescent City area
- Frequency: 97.9 MHz
- Branding: K-(Pod) Hot Country

Programming
- Format: Country
- Affiliations: Westwood One

Ownership
- Owner: Bicoastal Media Licenses II, LLC

History
- Former call signs: KTGK (1987–1988)

Technical information
- Licensing authority: FCC
- Facility ID: 37153
- Class: A
- ERP: 6,000 watts
- HAAT: −39 meters (−128 ft)
- Transmitter coordinates: 41°45′35″N 124°11′28″W

Links
- Public license information: Public file; LMS
- Webcast: Listen live
- Website: kpodfm.com

KPOD-FM (97.9 FM) is a radio station broadcasting a country music format. Licensed to Crescent City, California, United States, the station serves the Crescent City area. The station is currently owned by Bicoastal Media Licenses II, LLC.

== History ==
The station went on the air as KTGK on December 8, 1987. On February 4, 1988, the station changed its call sign to the current KPOD.

Previous logo
