= WOAK =

Coordinates: 32°57′57″N 84°59′08″W

- LaGrange, Georgia; United States
- Frequency: 90.9 MHz
- Branding: The Oak 90.9 fm

Programming
- Format: Christian radio

Ownership
- Owner: Oakside Christian School

History
- First air date: June 11, 1984

Technical information
- Licensing authority: FCC
- Facility ID: 49942
- Class: A
- ERP: 3,400 watts
- HAAT: 91 meters (299 ft)

Links
- Public license information: Public file; LMS
- Webcast: Listen live

WOAK is a Christian radio station licensed to LaGrange, Georgia, broadcasting on 90.9 FM. The station is owned by Oakside Christian School.

WOAK's programming includes Christian music and Christian talk and teaching. Christian talk and teaching programs on WOAK includes: Thru the Bible with J. Vernon McGee, Revive Our Hearts with Nancy DeMoss Wolgemuth, In Touch with Dr. Charles Stanley, The Family Altar Program with Lester Roloff, Love Worth Finding with Adrian Rogers, Turning Point with David Jeremiah, and Adventures in Odyssey.
