= KOLG =

Catholic radio station in Hagåtña, Guam

- Hagåtña; Guam
- Broadcast area: Guam
- Frequency: 90.9 MHz
- Branding: KOLG 90.9

Programming
- Format: Catholic

Ownership
- Owner: Catholic Educational Radio – Archdiocese of Agaña; (Archbishop Michael J. Byrnes (transfer of license pending) (Note: The license is held by the archbishop as a corporation sole.))

History
- First air date: September 20, 1991
- Former call signs: K225AN (now K227CT)
- Call sign meaning: Our Light in Guam

Technical information
- Licensing authority: FCC
- Class: C
- ERP: 5,700 watts
- HAAT: 154 meters (505 feet)
- Transmitter coordinates: 13°29′21″N 144°49′33″E

Links
- Public license information: Public file; LMS
- Website: www.kolg.org

KOLG (90.9 FM) is Guam's traditional religious and inspirational programmed radio station. The station is owned and operated by the Archbishop of Agaña, and is licensed to Hagåtña. The station signed on the air on September 20, 1991.

The station was assigned the KOLG call letters by the Federal Communications Commission on September 20, 1991.

The station's original tower was toppled by Super Typhoon Pongsona in 2002; sailors from the USS Frank Cable helped to remove it. In 2019, the archdiocese warned that KOLG needed $50,000 to $100,000 in additional operating funds or it would close.
