= WOHC =

- Chillicothe, Ohio; United States
- Frequency: 90.1 MHz
- Branding: Air1

Programming
- Format: Christian worship
- Affiliations: Air1

Ownership
- Owner: Educational Media Foundation

History
- First air date: May 1, 1992

Technical information
- Licensing authority: FCC
- Facility ID: 65503
- Class: B1
- ERP: 7,000 watts
- HAAT: 120.0 meters
- Transmitter coordinates: 39°20′45.00″N 83°11′15.00″W

Links
- Public license information: Public file; LMS
- Webcast: Listen Live
- Website: air1.com

WOHC (90.1 FM) is a Christian worship formatted radio station licensed to Chillicothe, Ohio, United States and broadcasts the nationally syndicated Air1 feed. The station is currently owned by Educational Media Foundation.
