= KPSH =

- Coachella, California; United States
- Broadcast area: Palm Springs, California
- Frequency: 90.9 MHz

Programming
- Format: Christian

Ownership
- Owner: Family Worship Center Church, Inc.; (Jimmy Swaggart Ministries)

History
- First air date: January 2005

Technical information
- Licensing authority: FCC
- Facility ID: 87604
- Class: A
- ERP: 230 watts
- HAAT: 190 meters (620 ft)
- Transmitter coordinates: 33°52′3″N 116°25′58″W

Links
- Public license information: Public file; LMS
- Website: sonlifetv.com

KPSH (90.9 FM) is a radio station licensed to Coachella, California, United States, and serving the Palm Springs market. The station is currently owned by Family Worship Center Church, Inc., which is part of Jimmy Swaggart Ministries. KPSH broadcasts a Christian radio format.

Family Worship Center acquired the construction permit for KPSH from Shepherd Communications for $750,000 in 2004; it was targeted to be on the air by January 2005. The station was formerly known as "V-91."

An earlier KPSH was owned and operated by the Palm Springs Unified School District, transmitting from the grounds of the Palm Springs High School at 88.3 FM. That station is now KPSC (88.5).
