= WOWB =

- Brewton, Alabama; United States
- Frequency: 90.9 MHz
- Branding: WOW 90.9

Programming
- Format: Contemporary Christian

Ownership
- Owner: Agape Educational Media, Inc.

History
- First air date: 1998 (as WPHG-FM)
- Former call signs: WGYJ-FM (1996–1997); WPHG-FM (1997–2000); WELJ (2000–2009)
- Call sign meaning: WOW [Radio] Brewton

Technical information
- Licensing authority: FCC
- Facility ID: 40428
- Class: C1
- ERP: 100,000 watts
- HAAT: 153 meters (502 feet)
- Transmitter coordinates: 31°18′13″N 87°02′50″W

Links
- Public license information: Public file; LMS
- Webcast: Listen Live
- Website: wowradio.org

WOWB (90.9 FM; "WOW 90.9") is a radio station licensed to serve Brewton, Alabama, United States. The station is owned by Agape Educational Media. It airs a contemporary Christian music format.

== History ==
The station's original construction permit was granted by the Federal Communications Commission on December 13, 1994. The new station was assigned the call letters WGYJ-FM on February 23, 1996. The station, still under construction, changed callsigns to WPHG-FM on November 7, 1997. After several extensions and modifications to the original permit, the station received its license to cover on October 27, 1998.

In August 2000, Marranatha Ministries Foundation Inc. (John Mathis, president) reached an agreement to sell WPHG-FM to Gateway Public Radio (Gladys M. Fleming, president) for a reported sale price of $3,500. The deal was approved by the FCC on October 12, 2000, and the transaction was consummated on November 12, 2000. The new owners had the call letters changed by the FCC to WELJ on December 25, 2000.

In October 2008, Gateway Public Radio (Earl Thompson, president) reached an agreement to sell WELJ to Agape Educational Media, Inc. (Dale Riddick, president) in exchange for a $100,000 promissory note. The call letters were changed, this time to WOWB, on December 14, 2009.

Radio-Locator and fccdata.org is now reporting this station has a CP to change their COL to Jay, Florida. The CP was issued on March 30, 2017 and is scheduled to expire on March 30, 2020.
