= Gravel Ridge, Arkansas =

- CDP
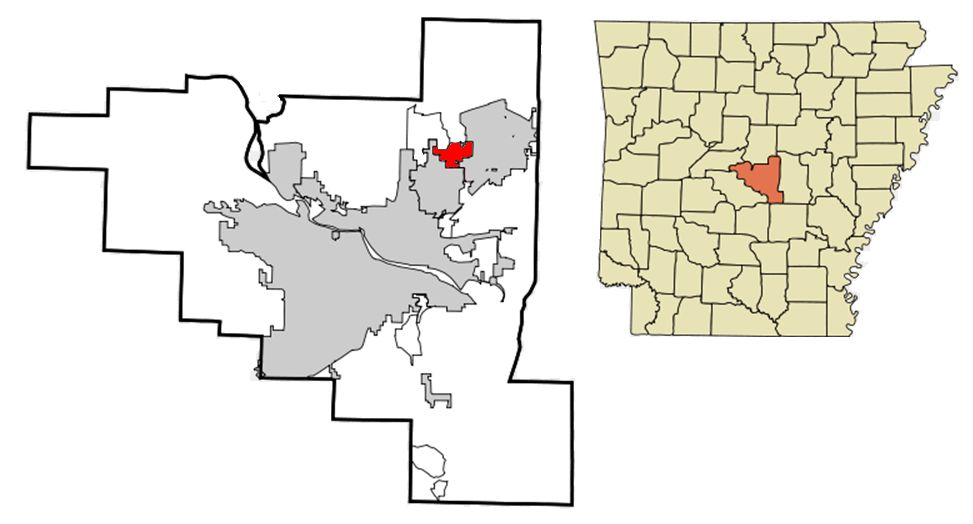
- Location in Pulaski County and the state of Arkansas
- Coordinates: 34°52′12″N 92°11′13″W
- Country: United States
- State: Arkansas
- County: Pulaski

Area
  - Total: 1.9 sq mi (4.9 km^{2})
  - Land: 1.9 sq mi (4.9 km^{2})
  - Water: 0 sq mi (0 km^{2})
- Elevation: 253 ft (77 m)

Population (2000)
  - Total: 3,232
  - Density: 1,708/sq mi (659.6/km^{2})
- Time zone: UTC-6 (Central (CST))
  - Summer (DST): UTC-5 (CDT)
- ZIP code: 72076
- Area code: 501
- FIPS code: 05-28270
- GNIS feature ID: 0057842

Gravel Ridge is a former census-designated place (CDP) in Pulaski County, Arkansas, United States. The population was 3,232 at the 2000 census. It has been annexed into the city of Sherwood and is part of the Little Rock–North Little Rock–Conway Metropolitan Statistical Area.

== Geography ==
Gravel Ridge is located at 34°52′12″N 92°11′13″W (34.870068, -92.187069).

According to the United States Census Bureau, the CDP has a total area of 1.9 square miles (4.9 km^{2}), all of it land.

== History ==
In a special election on April 1, 2008, voters in Gravel Ridge decided to annex to the adjacent city of Sherwood. The annexation had been contested between Sherwood and Jacksonville. Both cities sought to annex Gravel Ridge, and voters in both cities approved proposals to add Gravel Ridge to their cities. In the April 1 election, Gravel Ridge voters were asked to choose between Sherwood and Jacksonville. The results showed a strong preference for Sherwood, which received 74 percent of the votes to 26 percent for Jacksonville.

== Demographics ==
As of the census of 2000, there were 3,232 people, 1,275 households, and 887 families residing in the CDP. The population density was 1,709.9 inhabitants per square mile (660.2/km^{2}). There were 1,331 housing units at an average density of 704.2 per square mile (271.9/km^{2}). The racial makeup of the CDP was 80.57% White, 14.17% Black, 0.65% Native American, 1.08% Asian, 0.03% Pacific Islander, 1.11% from other races, and 2.38% from two or more races. 2.94% of the population were Hispanic or Latino of any race.

There were 1,275 households, out of which 36.2% had children under the age of 18 living with them, 52.7% were married couples living together, 13.7% had a female householder with no husband present, and 30.4% were non-families. 26.1% of all households were made up of individuals, and 5.7% had someone living alone who was 65 years of age or older. The average household size was 2.53 and the average family size was 3.06.

In the CDP, the population was spread out, with 26.9% under the age of 18, 10.9% from 18 to 24, 34.4% from 25 to 44, 21.1% from 45 to 64, and 6.8% who were 65 years of age or older. The median age was 32 years. For every 100 females, there were 94.2 males. For every 100 females age 18 and over, there were 91.1 males.

The median income for a household in the CDP was $39,551, and the median income for a family was $44,318. Males had a median income of $31,553 versus $21,903 for females. The per capita income for the CDP was $16,932. About 7.9% of families and 8.5% of the population were below the poverty line, including 10.6% of those under age 18 and 12.9% of those age 65 or over.

== Climate ==
The climate in this area is characterized by hot, humid summers and generally mild to cool winters. According to the Köppen Climate Classification system, Gravel Ridge has a humid subtropical climate, abbreviated "Cfa" on climate maps.
