= WNZR =

Coordinates: 40.371°N 82.468°W

- Mount Vernon, Ohio; United States
- Frequency: 90.9 MHz
- Branding: The Lifeline

Programming
- Format: Contemporary Christian

Ownership
- Owner: Mount Vernon Nazarene University

History
- First air date: February 13, 1986
- Call sign meaning: Nazarene

Technical information
- Licensing authority: FCC
- Facility ID: 46748
- Class: A
- ERP: 1,300 watts
- HAAT: 57.3 meters (188 ft)

Links
- Public license information: Public file; LMS
- Website: wnzr.fm

WNZR (90.9 FM) is a noncommercial educational radio station licensed to Mount Vernon, Ohio, United States. Owned by Mount Vernon Nazarene University, it features a Christian contemporary format with studios and transmitter located on the university campus. WNZR signed on in October 1986 and serves a dual purpose as a laboratory for radio broadcasting classes and a broadcast ministry of MVNU.

WNZR is licensed by the Federal Communications Commission as a non-commercial educational (NCE) station, and is located in the NCE range of the FM bandwidth. WNZR was originally licensed to operate around 140 watts. In May 2008, the station was approved for a power increase up to 1300 watts and went live with a new transmitter on May 21, 2010. WNZR's signal now reaches into bordering counties (Licking, Morrow, and Richland). WNZR also streams online at www.wnzr.fm and has a smartphone app available on both the Google Play/Android platform and on the iTunes App Store.

WNZR is funded through support from the university's general academic budget, donations from listeners, and underwriting support from area businesses and organizations. It operates 24 hours a day, seven days a week, 365 days a year, broadcasting primarily an Adult Contemporary (AC) Christian music format, along with a variety of Christian teaching programs and athletic events.
