= KOKT-LP =

Tulsa, Oklahoma; United States
- Broadcast area: Tulsa, Oklahoma
- Frequency: 90.1 MHz

Programming
- Format: Variety

Ownership
- Owner: Electron Benders

History
- First air date: 2016
- Call sign meaning: Oklahoma, Tulsa

Technical information
- Licensing authority: FCC
- Facility ID: 194191
- Class: LP1
- ERP: 14 watts
- HAAT: 79 meters (259 ft)
- Transmitter coordinates: 36°03′47″N 95°55′10″W

Links
- Public license information: LMS
- Webcast: https://stationplaylist.com/playstream.asp?mount=listen.aac&port=7056&autoplay=1&title=KOKT+FM
- Website: http://www.kokt.org

KOKT-LP (90.1 FM) is a low-power FM radio station licensed to Tulsa, Oklahoma, United States. The station is currently owned by Electron Benders.

== History ==
The station has some significant programming features. Its normal daytime programming is Classic Rock, covering mostly from the 60s to the 80s. From 6 pm to 6 am it airs a nighttime program called Subterrania playing progressive rock. It may be the only extended format playing progressive rock on the US FM dial, aside from limited one-hour shows or similar. Another significant programming feature is that they play all-day blocks by a single artist if they have a concert in Tulsa that night, or in tribute if they have died.
