= WCVJ =

- Jefferson, Ohio; United States
- Broadcast area: Ashtabula County
- Frequency: 90.9 MHz
- Branding: Air1

Programming
- Format: Contemporary worship

Ownership
- Owner: Educational Media Foundation
- Sister stations: WOHK

History
- First air date: 1978
- Call sign meaning: "Celebrate Victory in Jesus"

Technical information
- Licensing authority: FCC
- Facility ID: 612
- Class: B1
- ERP: 1,850 watts
- HAAT: 196 meters (643 ft)
- Transmitter coordinates: 41°37′49.6″N 80°45′33.7″W

Links
- Public license information: Public file; LMS
- Website: air1.com

WCVJ (90.9 FM) is a non-commercial educational radio station licensed to Jefferson, Ohio, United States, airing a contemporary worship format via the Air1 network. The station is owned and operated by the Educational Media Foundation, the station serves Ashtabula County, as well as portions of Greater Cleveland and Northwestern Pennsylvania. WCVJ's transmitter is located on New Lyme Road in Jefferson.

== History ==
WCVJ went on the air in 1978. The station was locally owned and operated by Agape School, Inc., headed by Myron J. Hubler. The station transmitted 5,500 watts ERP with an antenna height of 372 feet.

For many years, the station signed on the air at 6 AM and signed off at 10 PM. The station was off the air on Sundays. The hymn "Victory in Jesus" played each morning at sign-on. The station's operating parameters, studio and mailing address was announced during the song. A prayer conducted by the morning DJ immediately followed. Right before sign-off, the evening DJ would say a prayer at the conclusion of the broadcast day, followed by the national anthem.

During the summer of 1982, WCVJ was frequently robbed by thieves stealing equipment, which put WCVJ off the air for certain amounts of time.

The broadcast day eventually expanded to 24 hours a day by the mid-1990s, but broadcasts on Sunday were completely automated. The station started a fundraising effort to build a taller broadcast tower. The tower raised the antenna to 571 feet, approximately a 200-foot increase. The tower was finally built in 2001. The transmission tower is marked by lights in the shape of a cross atop the tower. The station would also air a Contemporary Christian format mainly consisting of praise and worship music. National and local Christian teaching programs accounted for 50% of the daily broadcast schedule. The station played music tailored to teens and young adults on Saturday evenings, similar to the Air1 format that currently airs.

In September 2005, Agape School, Inc. sold WCVJ to Educational Media Foundation for $650,000. At that point, the station began broadcasting Air1's (at the time) Christian rock programming.

Air1 flipped from Christian rock to Christian CHR in 2013.

On January 1, 2019, Air1 shifted its format to focus on Contemporary worship music.
