= WONY =

- Oneonta, New York; United States
- Broadcast area: Otsego County, New York
- Frequency: 90.9 MHz
- Branding: W.O.N.Y. Oneonta

Programming
- Language: English
- Format: college radio
- Affiliations: Pacifica Radio Network

Ownership
- Owner: State University of New York at Oneonta

History
- First air date: 1976
- Call sign meaning: "Oneonta, New York"

Technical information
- Licensing authority: FCC
- Facility ID: 63109
- Class: A
- ERP: 180 watts
- HAAT: −22 meters (−72 ft)
- Transmitter coordinates: 42°28′02.20″N 75°03′38.50″W

Links
- Public license information: Public file; LMS
- Webcast: Listen live
- Website: www.wonyfm.org

WONY (90.9 FM, is a college radio station, on the campus of the State University of New York at Oneonta. The station's studios are located on the basement floor of the Hunt Union.

== External links and sources ==
- Official website
- Facility details for Facility ID 63109 (WONY) in the FCC Licensing and Management System
- WONY in Nielsen Audio's FM station database
