= KOKF =

Air1 radio station in Edmond–Oklahoma City, Oklahoma

Coordinates: 35.566°N 97.475°W

Edmond, Oklahoma; United States
- Broadcast area: Oklahoma City metropolitan area
- Frequency: 90.9 MHz

Programming
- Format: Contemporary worship music
- Network: Air1

Ownership
- Owner: Educational Media Foundation

History
- First air date: 1978
- Call sign meaning: Kings Of Kings Forever

Technical information
- Licensing authority: FCC
- Facility ID: 54418
- Class: C1
- ERP: 7,800 watts
- HAAT: 451 meters (1,480 ft)

Links
- Public license information: Public file; LMS
- Webcast: Listen Live
- Website: www.air1.com

KOKF (90.9 FM) is an Air1 affiliate contemporary worship music radio station serving the Oklahoma City metropolitan area, area and is owned by Educational Media Foundation.

== History ==
The station went on the air with a Christian music format in October 1978. The station switched to Christian contemporary hit radio in 1985, and was one of the first in the nation to adopt this format.

The station identified itself as Hit Music Radio 91 FM, during the day, from 6 am, to 7 pm, while playing different assortments of Christian pop, alternative, hip hop, and R&B.

During the night from 7 pm, to midnight, except Friday and Saturday nights, it played Christian rock and alternative music, and identified itself as The Alternative Edge.

On Friday and Saturday nights it played Christian techno, trance, and electronic music. On Fridays the show was known as the Friday Night Party Mixx, later the Weekend Party Mixx, then Lifted Radio. On Saturday it was known as The Weekend Party Mix with host DJ Matt Lindsey. These shows lasted from 7 pm, to midnight. Lifted Radio replayed from midnight to 5 am, after it originally aired.

Overnights except Friday night from 12 am, to 5 am, over the years featured a Christian heavy metal show known as Nitetime 91.

KOKF showcased several shows over the years during the weekend hours including Saturday Morning Raptunes, The Top-40 Countdown, All-Request Music Fest, The Weekend Jam, In The Groove, The All-Request and Dedication Show, the Sunday Shakedown, a Christian hip-hop and rap show, and a Christian indie rock show known as the Underdog Show.

Today 91 FM is no longer on the air. The station was sold in May 2006. 90.9 FM is now the home to the Air1 radio network, which is based in Rocklin, California. Air1 originally played an assortment of Christian pop and alternative as a continuation of 91 FM in the market. However, in January 2019, Air1 changed its long time format of Christian pop, rock, hip hop and R&B to contemporary worship music.

91 FM, its vision, ministry, and DJs were reborn into 91 Online on October 31, 2010 (on the 25th anniversary of 91FM.) Earlier that summer a board of directors was assembled to oversee and execute an online version of 91FM with the same open format, DJs and familiar programming. This online station broadcast off and on until ceasing operations in 2018.

Since 2006, another site, OKC91FM.com, has existed as a tribute site to KOKF as a local station. In early 2010, an Internet station was launched. This station, now known as Throwback91.com, played Christian pop, rock and hip hop from the 1990s and 2000s. The internet station lasted until 2017.

Some of the former 91FM staff and programming influences still exist as of 2020 on Crossover Radio, a locally owned and operated internet station.
