= KOAR =

Air 1 radio station in Beebe, Arkansas

- Beebe, Arkansas; United States
- Broadcast area: Searcy, Arkansas
- Frequency: 101.5 MHz
- Branding: Air1

Programming
- Format: Contemporary Christian
- Affiliations: Air1

Ownership
- Owner: Educational Media Foundation

History
- Former call signs: KPIK (1990–2001); KBGR (2001–2009)

Technical information
- Licensing authority: FCC
- Facility ID: 35482
- Class: A
- ERP: 6,000 watts
- HAAT: 100 meters (330 ft)
- Transmitter coordinates: 35°11′26″N 91°54′45″W

Links
- Public license information: Public file; LMS
- Webcast: Listen Live
- Website: air1.com

KOAR (101.5 FM) is a non-commercial educational radio station licensed to serve Beebe, Arkansas, United States. The station is owned by the Educational Media Foundation.

== Programming ==
KOAR broadcasts a contemporary Christian music format to the Searcy, Arkansas, area as an affiliate of the Air 1 radio network.

== History ==
This station received its original construction permit from the Federal Communications Commission on April 27, 1990. The new station was assigned the KPIK call sign by the FCC on May 10, 1990. KPIK received its license to cover from the FCC on February 11, 1992.

In February 1993, license holders Judith Ann Davis and Barbara Jo Faith applied to the FCC to transfer the license for this station to a new company called KPIK Communications, Inc. The deal was approved by the FCC on March 9, 1993, and the transaction was consummated on April 22, 1993.

In May 2001, KPIK Communications, Inc., reached an agreement to sell this station to Searcy Broadcasting, Inc. The deal was approved by the FCC on June 13, 2001, and the transaction was consummated on June 22, 2001. The new owners had the FCC change the call sign to KBGR on July 9, 2001.

In March 2005, Searcy Broadcasting, Inc., reached an agreement to sell this station to the Educational Media Foundation for a reported sale price of $525,000. The deal was approved by the FCC on June 9, 2005, and the transaction was consummated on July 25, 2005. At the time of the sale, KBGR was broadcasting a country music format.

The EMF flipped the station to a contemporary Christian music format and added the station to their Air 1 network. The station was assigned call sign KOAR on March 25, 2009.
