= Mass media in Durango, Colorado =

Durango media

Durango is a center of media in southwestern Colorado and the larger Four Corners region. The following is a list of media outlets based in the city.

== Print ==
=== Newspapers ===
The Durango Herald is the city's primary newspaper that is published daily. The Durango Telegraph, a weekly alternative newspaper, is also published in the city. DGO Magazine, a free alt-weekly also known as "freekly," is published at Durango as well.

== Radio ==
The following is a list of radio stations that broadcast from and/or are licensed to Durango.

=== AM ===
Frequency	Callsign	Format	City of License	Notes
930	KIUP	Sports	Durango, Colorado	-
1240	KDGO	News/Talk	Durango, Colorado	-

=== FM ===
Frequency	Callsign	Format	City of License	Notes
88.5	KTDU	Religious	Durango, Colorado	Translator of KTLF, Colorado Springs, Colorado
89.3	KDNG	Adult Album Alternative	Durango, Colorado	Translator of KSUT, Ignacio, Colorado
90.5	K213AD	Christian Contemporary	Durango, Colorado	Translator of KNMI, Farmington, New Mexico
91.9	KDUR	Variety	Durango, Colorado	Fort Lewis College radio
92.9	KPTE	Adult Contemporary	Bayfield, Colorado	Broadcasts from Durango
94.3	K232DA	Religious	Durango, Colorado	Translator of KTGW, Fruitland, New Mexico
97.3	K247AU	Hot Adult Contemporary	Durango, Colorado	Translator of KIQX
97.7	K249DE	Country	Durango, Colorado	Translator of KISZ-FM, Cortez, Colorado
99.7	KKDG	Top 40	Durango, Colorado	-
100.5	KRSJ	Country	Durango, Colorado	-
101.3	KIQX	Hot Adult Contemporary	Durango, Colorado	-
105.3	KXRC	Classic Rock	Durango, Colorado	-
105.9	K290AD	Religious	Durango, Colorado	Translator of KPCL, Farmington, New Mexico
106.7	K294AJ	Active Rock	Durango, Colorado	Translator of KDAG, Farmington, New Mexico
107.7	K299AJ	Top 40	Durango, Colorado	Translator of KOLZ in Kirtland, New Mexico, Kirtland, New Mexico

== Television ==
Durango is in the Albuquerque-Santa Fe television market.

The following is a list of television stations that broadcast from and/or are licensed to Durango

Display Channel	Network	Callsign	City of License	Notes
2.1	Telemundo	KREZ-LD	Durango, Colorado	Translator of KASA-TV, Santa Fe, New Mexico
6.1	Fox	K45DH-D	Durango, Colorado	Translator of KRQE, Albuquerque, New Mexico
6.2	Independent	K45DH-D	Durango, Colorado	Translator of KRQE, Albuquerque, New Mexico
7.1	ABC	K45DH-D	Durango, Colorado	Translator of KOAT-TV, Albuquerque, New Mexico
7.2	Estrella TV	K45DH-D	Durango, Colorado	Translator of KOAT-TV, Albuquerque, New Mexico
7.4	CBS	K45DH-D	Durango, Colorado	Translator of KOAT-TV, Albuquerque, New Mexico
12.1	NBC	K25GE-D	Durango, Colorado	Translator of KOB, Albuquerque, New Mexico
16.1	EICB TV	K16GZ-D	Durango, Colorado	-
20.1	PBS	KRMU	Durango, Colorado	Satellite station of KRMA-TV, Denver, Colorado
33.1	TeleXitos	KRTN-TV	Durango, Colorado	-
