= KISZ-FM =

Coordinates: 37.363°N 108.151°W

- Cortez, Colorado; United States
- Broadcast area: Four Corners area
- Frequency: 97.9 MHz
- Branding: Kiss Country

Programming
- Format: Country

Ownership
- Owner: Hutton Broadcasting, LLC
- Sister stations: KENN, KRWN, KPRT-FM, KPTE, KKDG, KDGO, KRTZ, KVFC

History
- First air date: 1979
- Call sign meaning: "Kiss Country"

Technical information
- Licensing authority: FCC
- Facility ID: 54005
- Class: C
- ERP: 100,000 watts
- HAAT: 399 meters (1,309 ft)
- Translator: 99.3 K257DQ (Farmington, New Mexico)

Links
- Public license information: Public file; LMS
- Webcast: Listen live
- Website: kisscountry.net

KISZ-FM (97.9 MHz) is a country music radio station in the Four Corners area of the Western United States. It is licensed to Cortez, Colorado and is owned by Hutton Broadcasting, LLC. Bill Kruger-Regional Director, Overnights feature "Kickin It With Kix", hosted by Kix Brooks. Weekday mornings are hosted by nationally syndicated Big D, and Bubba. Evenings feature Lia Night, and the award-winning "Nights with Lia" Monday through Saturday. Sunday's feature the "American Christian Music Review", Thunder Road", "American Country Countdown", and "The Road".

The station also has a booster, KISZ-FM1 in Farmington, New Mexico.

KISZ went on the air on April 17, 1979. Before becoming “Kiss Country” in the 1990s, it was “Kiss 98” with a Top 40 format.
