= KENN (AM) =

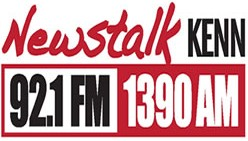
- Farmington, New Mexico; United States
- Broadcast area: Four Corners area
- Frequency: 1390 kHz
- Branding: News Talk KENN 92.1 & 1390

Programming
- Format: Talk radio
- Affiliations: Fox News Radio; Premiere Networks; Westwood One

Ownership
- Owner: Hutton Broadcasting, LLC
- Sister stations: KISZ-FM, KRWN, KPRT-FM, KVFC, KDGO, KPTE, KKDG

History
- First air date: 1951
- Former call signs: KVBC (1951–1958)

Technical information
- Licensing authority: FCC
- Facility ID: 33953
- Class: B
- Power: 5,000 watts (day); 1,300 watts (night)
- Transmitter coordinates: 36°42′27″N 108°8′50″W
- Translator: see below

Links
- Public license information: Public file; LMS
- Webcast: Listen live
- Website: kennradio.com

KENN (1390 AM) is a radio station broadcasting a talk radio format. Licensed to Farmington, New Mexico, United States, the station serves the Four Corners area. The station is currently owned by Hutton Broadcasting, LLC and features programming from Fox News Radio, Premiere Networks and Westwood One.

== History ==
The station was first licensed, as KVBC, in 1951, to Luella M. Bowles and Marvin E. Bowles, doing business as the Valley Broadcasting Company in Farmington. It initially operated with 250 watts on 1240 kHz, which in 1957 was changed to 5,000 watts daytime and 1,000 watts at night on 1390 kHz. On September 1, 1958 the call sign was changed to KENN.

=== Expanded Band assignment ===
On March 17, 1997 the Federal Communications Commission (FCC) announced that eighty-eight stations had been given permission to move to newly available "Expanded Band" transmitting frequencies, ranging from 1610 to 1700 kHz, with KENN authorized to move from 1390 to 1620 kHz. A Construction Permit for the expanded band station, also located in Farmington, was assigned the call letters KBAG in March 1998, which was changed to KNNT a month later. However the expanded band station was never built, and its Construction Permit was cancelled on January 9, 2001.

== FM Translator ==
In order to expand coverage of the main station, KENN also broadcasts on an FM translator at 92.1 MHz.

Call sign	Frequency	City of license	FID	ERP (W)	Class	FCC info
K221DJ	92.1 FM	Farmington, New Mexico	30200	101	D	LMS
