= KPRT-FM =

- Kirtland, New Mexico; United States
- Broadcast area: Four Corners
- Frequency: 107.9 MHz
- Branding: Pirate Radio 107.9

Programming
- Format: Variety hits
- Affiliations: Premiere Networks

Ownership
- Owner: Hutton Broadcasting, LLC
- Sister stations: KENN, KISZ-FM, KKDG, KRTZ, KRWN

History
- First air date: January 2012
- Call sign meaning: K PiRaTe

Technical information
- Licensing authority: FCC
- Facility ID: 165985
- Class: A
- ERP: 6,000 watts
- HAAT: 97 meters (318 ft)
- Transmitter coordinates: 36°41′45″N 108°13′23″W

Links
- Public license information: Public file; LMS

KPRT-FM (107.9 MHz) is a radio station licensed to Kirtland, New Mexico, United States. The station serves the Four Corners area and is currently owned by Hutton Broadcasting, LLC.

KPRT-FM signed on in January 2012 and airs a variety hits music format branded as "Pirate Radio".
