= Éric Claude Gaucher =

French geochemist

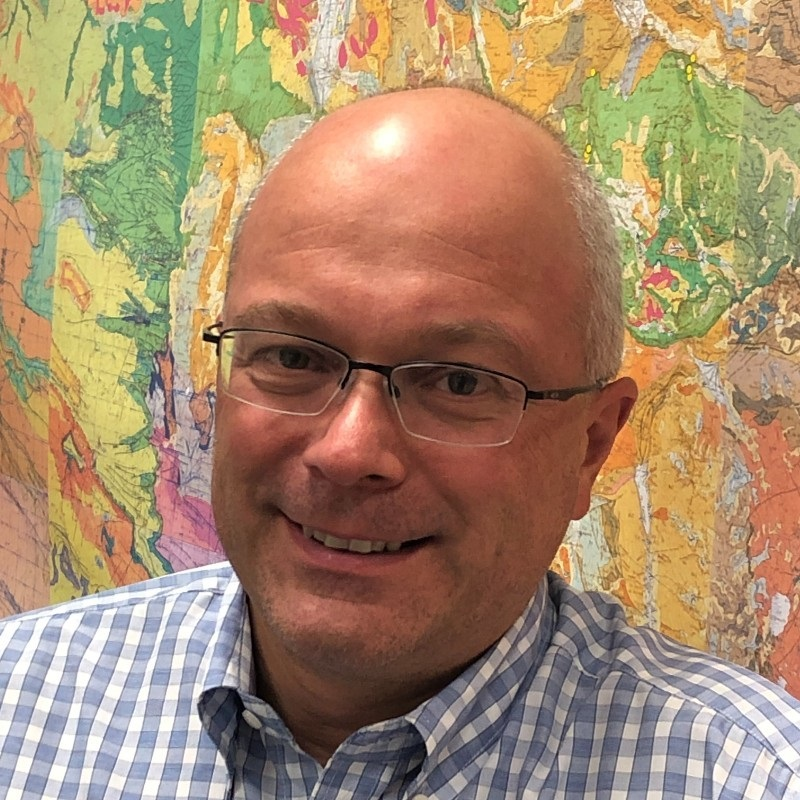
- Known for: exploration of natural hydrogen
- Scientific career
- Fields: geochemistry

Éric Claude Gaucher, born in November 1970, is a French geochemist with an international reputation in the field of geo-energy and geological storage. He is a specialist in the calculation of water-rock-gas interactions. He is actively involved in the energy transition through his work on the exploration of natural hydrogen. He manages Lavoisier H2 Geoconsult since 2022.

== Biography ==
=== Education ===
In 1993, he obtained a master's degree in Earth sciences at the École Normale Supérieure de Lyon (France). In 1998, under the direction of professor of water chemistry, Gil Michard, Éric Gaucher published a thesis on the water-clays interaction for the CEA and the University of Paris-Diderot.

=== Career ===
In 1998, Éric Gaucher began his career at the French Geological Survey (BRGM) in Orléans. There he led a research unit working in particular on the stability of clay formations for the management of radioactive waste and the geological storage of carbon dioxide .

In 2012, he joined TotalEnergies, where his work focuses on water-rock-gas interactions from of a laboratory to geological basin scale using experimental, field and numerical modeling methods. His main research objectives are to understand the behavior of carbon dioxide in sediments (e.g. diagenesis, carbon dioxide storage ), he now studies abiotic gases ( dihydrogen, methane ) in natural systems mainly related to serpentinization.

In 2021, Éric Gaucher joined the University of Bern as associate researcher in the Institute of Geological Sciences. His h-index on Google Scholar is 38 in January 2023. In his research of economic gases in France, he also observed how hydrogen sulphide, by its oxidation, is at the origin of large karstic caverns.

In 2022, he founded a start-up specializing in the natural hydrogen exploration, Lavoisier H2 Geoconsult. His company is a partner of 45-8 Energy's Grand-Rieu exploration permit in the Nouvelle Aquitaine region of France.

His research on native hydrogen encouraged him to believe that industrial exploitation of this energy resource was possible, and declared in 2023 that he hoped that investors would take the initiative to launch exploration projects. His last research is focused on characterizing the volume of native hydrogen in Switzerland for industrial production, particularly in the Valais region. He compares the economic potential of native hydrogen to the discovery of oil in 1859 in Titusville by the drilling of Edwin Drake. A first dihydrogen drilling already illustrates this possibility since 1987 in Bourakébougou in Mali.

In 2024, he and Olivier Sissmann were appointed to lead the Task 49 Natural Hydrogen in the Hydrogen Technology Collaboration Program, a program from the International Energy Agency. This international research group aims to "raise awareness of the state of research and industrial exploration of this new energy source" (natural hydrogen).

== Publications ==
- Gaucher, Eric C.; Blanc, P. (2006). "Cement/clay interactions – A review: Experiments, natural analogues, and modeling". Waste Management. 26 (7): 776–788. doi:10.1016/j.wasman.2006.01.027.
- Gaucher, Éric C.; Altmann, S.; Pearson, FJ; Blanc, P. (November 1, 2009). "A robust model for pore-water chemistry of clayrock". Geochimica et Cosmochimica Acta. 26 (73): 6470–6487. doi:10.1016/j.gca.2009.07.021.
- Gaucher, Éric C. (February 2020). "New Perspectives in the Industrial Exploration for Native Hydrogen". Elements. 16 (1): 8–9. doi:10.2138/gselements.16.1.8.
- Osselin, F.; Pichavant, M.; Fauguerolles, C.; Gaucher, Eric C. (October 3, 2022). "Orange hydrogen is the new green". Nature Geoscience. 15 (10): 765–769. doi:10.1038/s41561-022-01043-9.
- Naumenko-Dèzes, M.; Mayer, B.; Blessing, M.; Bondu, R.; Bondu, R.; Gaucher, Eric C. (February 17, 2022). "Natural gas of radiolytic origin: An overlooked component of shale gas". Proceedings of the National Academy of Sciences. 119 (15). doi:10.1073/pnas.2114720119.
- Gaucher, Éric C. (June 2020). "Une découverte d'hydrogène naturel dans les Pyrénées-Atlantiques, première étape vers une exploration industrielle" [A natural hydrogen discovery in the Pyrénées-Atlantiques region, the first step towards industrial exploration]. Géologues, Société géologique de France (in French) (213).
- Gaucher, Éric C.; Moretti, I.; Gonthier, N.; Pélissier, N.; Burridge, G. (June 2023). "The place of natural hydrogen in the energy transition: A position paper". European Geologist Journal (55). doi:10.5281/zenodo.8108239.
- Zwaan, F.; Brune, S.; Glerum, Anne C.; Vasey, Dylan A.; Naliboff, John B.; Manatschal, G.; Gaucher, Éric C. (February 2025). "Rift-inversion orogens are potential hot spots for natural H2 generation". Science Advances (8). doi:10.1126/sciadv.adr3418. PMC 11838002.

== Bibliography ==
- Andreas Hirstein (March 4, 2023). "Wasserstoff: Der grüne Schatz" [Hydrogen: The Green Treasure]. NZZ am Sonntag (in German)..
