= KIQX =

- Durango, Colorado; United States
- Broadcast area: Four Corners
- Frequency: 101.3 MHz
- Branding: Radio 101

Programming
- Format: Hot adult contemporary/Variety
- Affiliations: NBC News Radio

Ownership
- Owner: Four Corners Broadcasting, LLC
- Sister stations: KRSJ, KIUP, KKDC

Technical information
- Licensing authority: FCC
- Facility ID: 22174
- Class: C
- ERP: 100,000 watts
- HAAT: 127 meters
- Transmitter coordinates: 37°15′44″N 107°54′8″W
- Translators: 96.5 K243AO (Farmington, New Mexico); 97.5 K248AF (Pagosa Springs); 104.9 K285AK (Cortez); 104.9 K285AN (Monticello-Blanding, Utah)

Links
- Public license information: Public file; LMS
- Webcast: Listen
- Website: KIQX Online

KIQX (101.3 FM) is a radio station broadcasting a hot adult contemporary/Variety format which includes adult alternative, classic rock and Rhythm & Blues. Licensed to Durango, Colorado, United States, the station serves the Four Corners area. The station is currently owned by Four Corners Broadcasting, LLC and features programming from NBC News Radio.

== Personalities ==
- Ed Lacy in the Morning
- Brett Lustig in the Afternoon
