= Hibari =

Hibari (ひばり) is the Japanese name for the Eurasian skylark.

Hibari may also refer to:

== People ==
- Hibari Misora (美空 ひばり, 1937–1989), Japanese singer and actress

=== Fictional characters ===
- Hibari, a character in the video game series Senran Kagura
- Hibari Ōzora, the title character of the manga series Stop!! Hibari-kun!
- Kyoya Hibari, a character in the manga series Reborn!

== Places ==
- Hibari Station, a Japanese railway station
- Studio Hibari, a Japanese animation studio

== Other uses ==
- Hibari (satellite), a proposed space telescope to test a stable orientation method

== See also ==
- Hybari (pronounced the same), also known as the FV-E991 series, a hydrogen fuel cell and Li-ion battery hybrid train operated by JR East
