= Hydrogen train =

Train transporting or using hydrogen

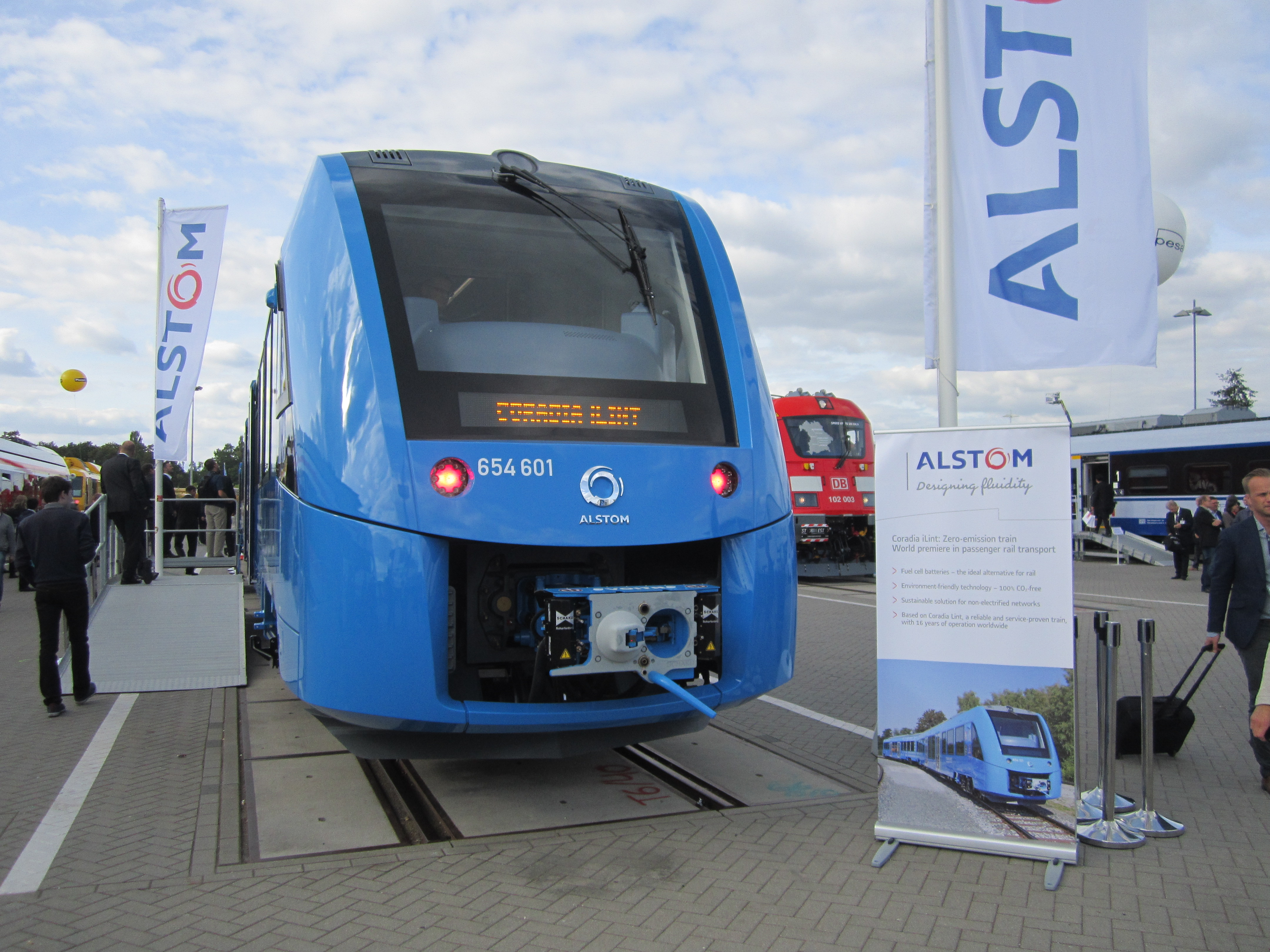
Debut of the Alstom Coradia iLint, a hydrogen-powered passenger train, at InnoTrans 2016

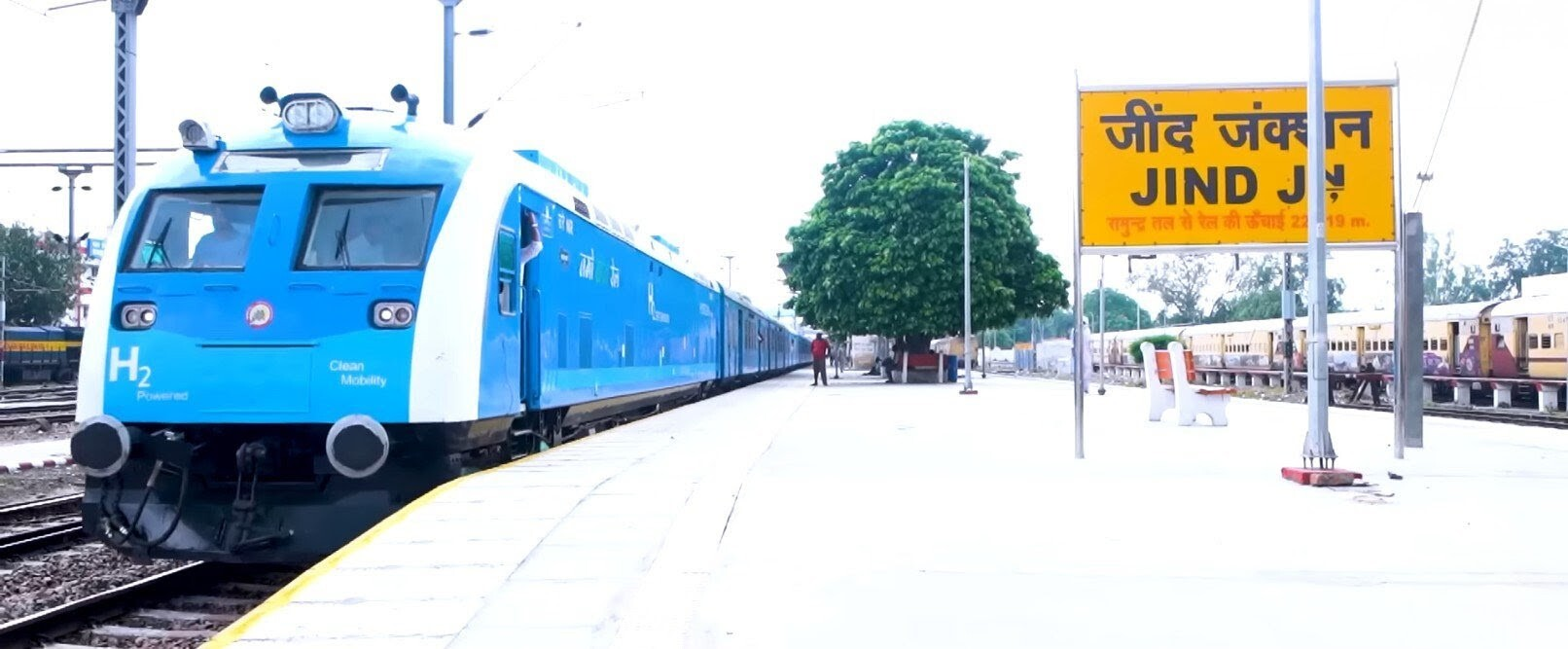
India's indigenously developed Namo Green Rail hydrogen fuel cell train of Indian Railways

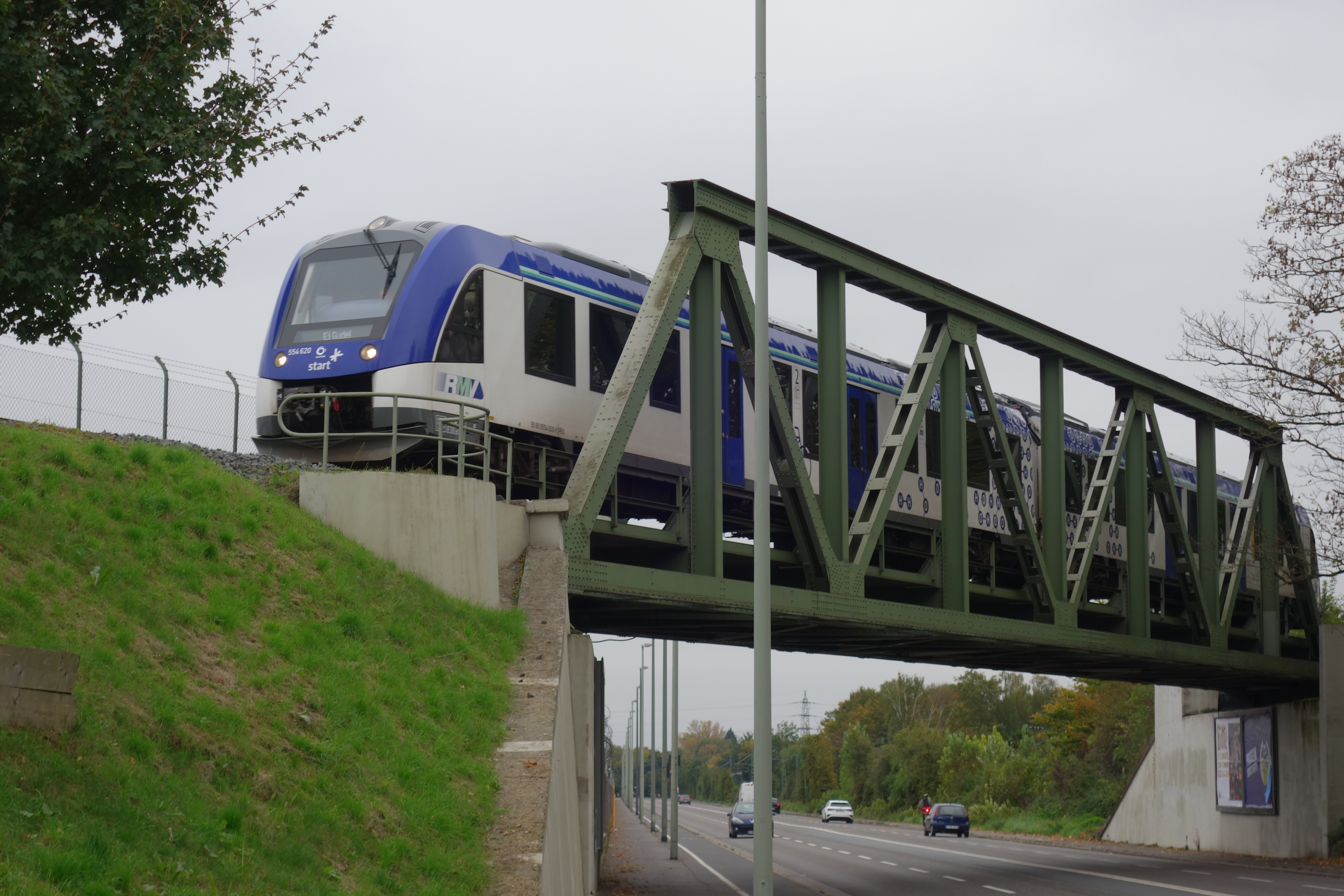
iLint of Regionalverkehre Start Deutschland on the way to its filling station at industrial park Höchst

In transportation, the original (2003) generic term "hydrail" includes hydrogen trains, zero-emission multiple units, or ZEMUs—generic terms describing rail vehicles, large or small, which use on-board hydrogen fuel as a source of energy to power the traction motors, or the auxiliaries, or both. Hydrail vehicles use the chemical energy of hydrogen for propulsion, either by burning hydrogen in a hydrogen internal combustion engine, or by reacting hydrogen with oxygen in a fuel cell to run electric motors, as the hydrogen fuel cell train. Widespread use of hydrogen for fueling rail transportation is a basic element of the proposed hydrogen economy. The term has been used by research scholars and technicians around the world.

Hydrail vehicles are usually hybrid vehicles with renewable energy storage, such as batteries or super capacitors, for regenerative braking, improving efficiency and lowering the amount of hydrogen storage required. Potential hydrail applications include all types of rail transport: commuter rail; passenger rail; freight rail; light rail; rail rapid transit; mine railways; industrial railway systems; trams; and special rail rides at parks and museums.

The term hydrail is believed to date back to 22 August 2003, from an invited presentation at the US Department of Transportation's Volpe Transportations Systems Center in Cambridge, Massachusetts. There, Stan Thompson, a former futurist and strategic planner at US telecoms company AT&T gave a presentation entitled the Mooresville Hydrail Initiative. However, according to authors Stan Thompson and Jim Bowman, the term first appeared in print on 17 February 2004 in the International Journal of Hydrogen Energy as a search engine target word to enable scholars and technicians around the world working in the hydrogen rail area to more easily publish and locate all work produced within the discipline.

Since 2005, annual International Hydrail Conferences have been held. Organised by Appalachian State University and the Mooresville South Iredell Chamber of Commerce in conjunction with universities and other entities, the Conferences have the aim of bringing together scientists, engineers, business leaders, industrial experts, and operators working or using the technology around the world in order to expedite deployment of the technology for environmental, climate, energy security and economic development reasons. Presenters at these conferences have included national and state/provincial agencies from the US, Austria, Canada, China, Denmark, the EU, Germany, France, Italy, Japan, Korea, Russia, Turkey, the United Kingdom and the United Nations (UNIDO-ICHET). In its early years, these conferences were largely dominated by academic fields; however, by 2013, an increasing number of businesses and industrial figures have reportedly been in attendance.

During the 2010s, both fuel cells and hydrogen generation equipment have been taken up by several transport operators across various countries, such as China, Germany, Japan, Taiwan, the United Kingdom, and the United States. Many of the same technologies that can be applied to hydrail vehicles can be applied to other forms of transport as well, such as road vehicles.

== Technology ==
India's first Hydrogen train, showing the Hydrogen storage module, battery stacks and fuel cell.

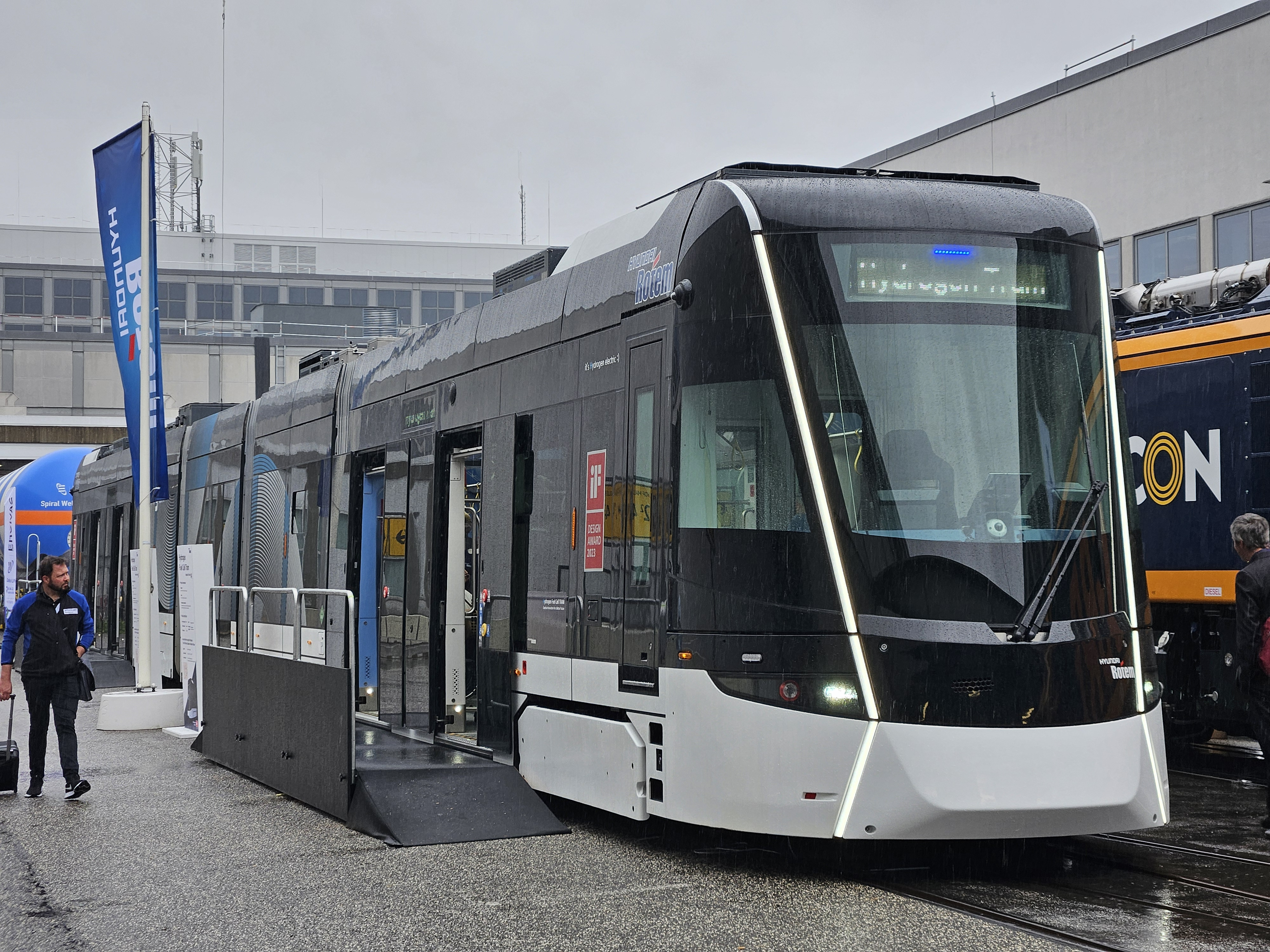
Hyundai Rotem Hydrogen Fuel cell Tram, pictured in 2024

Hydrogen is a common and easy to find element, given that each molecule of water has two atoms of hydrogen for every oxygen atom present. Hydrogen can be separated from water via several means, including steam reforming (normally involving the use of fossil fuels) and electrolysis (which requires large amounts of electricity and is less commonly used). Once isolated, hydrogen can serve as a form of fuel. It has been proposed that hydrogen for fueling hydrail vehicles can be produced in individual maintenance depots, requiring only a steady supply of electricity and water; it can then be pumped into pressurised tanks upon the vehicle.

The development of lighter and more capable fuel cells has increased the viability of hydrogen-powered vehicles. According to Canadian company Hydrogenics, in 2001 its 25 kW (34 hp) fuel cell weighed 290 kg (640 lb) and had an efficiency range between 38 and 45 percent; however, by 2017 their fuel cells weighed 72 kg (159 lb) with an efficiency of 48 to 55 percent, a roughly five-fold increase in power density. According to Rail Engineer, the use of hydrogen propulsion on certain types of trains (such as freight locomotives or high-speed trains) is less attractive and more challenging than on lower-powered applications (such as shunting locomotives and multiple units). The publication also observes that pressure to cut emissions within the railway industry is likely to play a role in stimulating demand for the uptake of hydrail.

A key technology of a typical hydrogen propulsion system is the fuel cell. This device converts the chemical energy contained within the hydrogen in order to generate electricity, as well as water and heat. As such, a fuel cell would operate in a manner that is essentially inverse to the electrolysis process used to create the fuel; consuming pure hydrogen to produce electricity rather than consuming electrical energy to produce hydrogen, albeit incurring some level of energy losses in the exchange. Reportedly, the efficiency of converting electricity to hydrogen and back again is just beneath 30 per cent, roughly similar to contemporary diesel engines but less than conventional electric traction using overhead catenary wires. The electricity produced by the onboard fuel cell would be fed into a motor to propel the train. Overhead wire electrification costs are around EUR 2m/km, so electrification is not cost-efficient for low-traffic routes and battery and hydrail solutions may be alternatives.

Railway industrial publication Railway Engineer has theorised that the expanding prevalence of wind power has led to some countries having surpluses of electrical energy during nighttime hours, and that this trend could offer a means of low-cost and highly available energy with which hydrogen could be conveniently produced via electrolysis. Thus, it is believed that the production of hydrogen using off-peak electricity available from countries' electrical grids will be one of the most economic practices available. As of January 2017, hydrogen produced via electrolysis commonly costs roughly the same as natural gas and costs almost double the price of diesel fuel; however, unlike either of these fossil-based fuels, hydrogen propulsion produces zero vehicle emissions. A 2018 European Commission report states that if hydrogen is produced by steam methane reforming, hydrail emissions are 45% lower than diesel trains.

According to Rail Engineer and Alstom, a 10 MW wind farm is capable of comfortably producing 2.5 t (2.5 long tons; 2.8 short tons) of hydrogen per day—enough to power a fleet of 14 iLint trains over a distance of 600 km (370 mi) per day. Reportedly, as of January 2017, production of hydrogen worldwide has been expanding in quantity and availability, increasing its attractiveness as a fuel. The need to build up a capable distribution network for hydrogen, which in turn requires substantial investments to be made, is likely to play a role in restraining the growth of hydrail at least in the short term.

It was observed by Railway Technology that the rail industry has been historically slow to adopt new technologies and relatively conservative in outlook; however, a successful large-scale deployment of this technology by an early adopter may be decisive in overcoming attitudes of reluctance and traditionalism. Additionally, there could be significant benefits to transitioning from diesel to hydrail propulsion. According to the results of a study performed by a consortium of Hitachi Rail Europe, the University of Birmingham, and Fuel Cell Systems Ltd, hydrail vehicles in the form of re-powered diesel multiple units could be capable of generating significant energy consumption reductions; reportedly, their model indicated a saving of up to 52 percent on the Norwich to Sheringham line over conventional traction. An intermediate step using existing railroad technology is burning a mixture of diesel and hydrogen in conventional engines, although this is not zero emission.

=== Hydrolley ===
A hydrolley is a term for a streetcar or tram (trolley) powered by hydrail technology. The term (for hydrogen trolley) was coined at the Fourth International Hydrail Conference, Valencia, Spain, in 2008, as a research-simplifying search engine target word. Onboard hydrogen-derived power eliminates the need for overhead trolley arms and track electrification, greatly reducing construction cost, reducing visual pollution and eliminating the maintenance expense of track electrification. The term 'hydrolley' is preferred to 'hydrail light rail' or other combinations which might connote external electrification.

=== Safety ===
Hydrogen is combustible in a wide range (4–74%) of mixtures with air, and explosive in 18–59%.

== Projects and prototypes ==
- In 2002, the first 3.6 t (3.5 long tons; 4.0 short tons), 17 kW (23 hp), hydrogen-powered mining locomotive powered by Nuvera Fuel Cells for Placer Dome was demonstrated in Val-d'Or, Quebec.
- In April 2006, the world's first hydrail railcar, which was developed by East Japan Railway Company, was developed.
- In October 2006, the Railway Technical Research Institute in Japan conducted tests on a fuel cell hydrail, a 70 t (68.9 long tons; 77.2 short tons) intercity train powered by Nuvera Fuel Cells.
- In April 2007, the mini-hydrail from the Taiwan National Science and Technology Museum and Taiwan Fuel Cell Partnership combination made its first educational ride.
- In 2007, the Railway Technical Research Institute in Japan built two 62 t (61.0 long tons; 68.3 short tons) passenger cars, each with a 450 kW (600 hp) PEM fuel cell and a 150 kW (200 hp) battery.
- In 2008, the East Japan Railway Company in Japan tested its experimental "NE Train" hybrid train fitted with two 65 kW (87 hp) PEM fuel cells and 19 kWh (68 MJ) lithium-ion batteries for a short period in the Nagano area.
- In 2009, BNSF Railway unveiled its Vehicle Projects HH20B, a switcher-locomotive powered by hydrogen fuel cells and developed in conjunction with the US Army Corps of Engineers and Vehicle Projects Inc. It reportedly performed its first run during 2010.
- In 2010, a 357-kilometre (222 mi) high-speed hydrail line was proposed in Indonesia. The rail link, now under feasibility study, would connect several cities in Java with a hydrogen-powered maglev system.
- In 2011, FEVE and the University of Valladolid (CIDAUT) launched the FC Tram H_{2} Project in Asturias using a converted FABIOLOS series 3400 from SNCV. It can carry up to 30 passengers with a maximum speed of 20 km/h (12 mph).
- During 2012, the Hydrogen Train Project in Denmark commenced its efforts to develop and build Europe's first hydrogen powered train using hydrogen in an internal combustion engine.
- In 2012, the mini-hydrail Hydrogen Pioneer Train from the University of Birmingham, a scaled powertrain for configuration testing.
- Between 2012 and 2014, testing was conducted on the hydrail concept in China. In November 2010, Southwest Jiaotong University demonstrated their first hydrail prototype.
- During 2012, Anglo American Platinum (Amplats) in South Africa and Vehicle Projects Inc. launched 5 PEMFC Trident new era locomotives at the Dishaba mine with reversible metal-hydride storage for testing.
- In 2014, the German states of Lower Saxony, North Rhine-Westphalia, Baden-Württemberg and the Public Transportation Authorities of Hesse signed a letter of intent with Alstom Transport for trials with two fuel cell Alstom Coradia trains by 2018.
- During 2015, the University of Warwick started work on a hydrogen powered locomotive. That same year, the Downtown Oranjestad streetcar in Aruba went into service; the Downtown Dubai Trolley Project is intended to go into service around Burj Khalifa and the Dubai Mall in Dubai. In 2015, CSR Sifang Co Ltd. showed its first 380-passenger tram in Qingdao, China.
- During September 2016, Alstom revealed their newly developed iLint train, produced at their factory in Salzgitter. In November 2017, the state of Lower Saxony's local transportation authority ordered an initial fleet of 14 iLints. Testing and approval by the German Federal Railway Authority Eisenbahn-Bundesamt commenced in late 2016.
- 2016 – CRRC TRC(Tangshan) developed the world's first commercial fuel cell hybrid tram and completed its first test run on Nanhu industrial tourism demonstration operation in 2017.
- 2018 – A pair of prototype Ilint trains are to enter regular revenue service on the Buxtehude–Bremervörde–Bremerhaven–Cuxhaven region. Schleswig-Holstein intends to electrify the entirety of its 1,100 km (680 mi) network using a fleet of 60 iLint hydrail vehicles by 2025. As of January 2018, all vehicles are planned to be maintained at a depot in Bremervorde, which will be the world's first hydrogen train refuelling depot; hydrogen is to be generated on-site using local wind turbines.
- In September 2017, Alstom proposed a trial of Hydrogen Fuel Cell powered train on the new Liverpool to Chester line in England, which is scheduled for opening in December 2018. Alstom have a new facility in Halebank on the edge of Liverpool adjacent to the line, with hydrogen available from the nearby Stanlow Refinery.
- In March 2018, the Sarawak state government in Malaysia proposed that the Kuching Light Rail Transit system will be powered using hydrogen fuel cells and is expected to be completed by 2024. However, in September 2018, the Sarawak Chief Minister announced that the project has been placed on hold, citing that the funds were needed elsewhere.
- In June 2019, East Japan Railway Company announced that it is investing into developing a two-car trainset using hydrogen fuel-cell technology from Toyota, hoping to start trials by 2021 and have commercially viable technology ready by 2024. Toyota has been using fuel cell technology in the Mirai cars.
- In June–July 2019, Italy's Ministry of Economic Development gathered stakeholders input on hydrogen rollout projects in various sectors, including rail transport. These included the conversion from diesel to hydrogen of a 310 km (190 mi) railway link across four regions of central Italy, from Sansepolcro (Tuscany) to Sulmona (Abruzzo). Developed by Italy's Cinque International together with US AECOM, Spain's Iberdrola and other local partners, the project was included in the priority list of Italy's Ministry of Transport and in the project pipeline of the European Clean Hydrogen Alliance. On 20 December 2021, the Prime Minister's office allocated €50M for the purchase of rolling stock and for three renewable hydrogen production sites alog the railway, albeit limited to the Terni-Rieti-L'Aquila-Sulmona route.
- In November 2019, the first hydrogen fuel cell train in the United States was ordered from Swiss manufacturer Stadler Rail for service on the soon to open Arrow commuter rail service between Redlands, California, and San Bernardino, California.
- On 17 March 2021, French Railway Company announced that 15 Hydrail would be operated on the Caen-Alençon-Le Mans-Tours line (northwest France) in the next 5 years. The line exclusively used diesel-fuelled X 72500 and XGC.
- In April 2021, 14 Hydrail (two of which optional) were ordered by French Railway Company from Alstom for an amount of 200 million euros. The trains will be operated by 2025 in four regions (Auvergne-Rhône-Alpes, Bourgogne-Franche-Comté, Grand Est et Occitanie). These trains have 600 km of autonomy without direct CO_{2} emission.
- In September 2022, Caltrans and CalSTA placed an order for 29 (four on official order and 25 optional) Hydrogen Fuel Cell transits from Stadler. These trains will be used on Amtrak California services.
- Hydrogen locomotives – BNSF, Caterpillar, Progress Rail, and Chevron partnered up in 2021 to develop a hydrogen fuel cell locomotive prototype. CSX and Canadian Pacific teamed up in 2023 to develop hydrogen conversion kits to retrofit diesel locomotives to hydrogen.
- The proposed Valley Link commuter rail service in Northern California is planning to use zero emission hydrogen trainsets for its operations.
- 2024: A hydrogen fuel-cell passenger train developed by Swiss rail vehicle maker Stadler Rail has achieved a new Guinness World Record, travelling nonstop for a distance of 1,741.7 mi (2,803.0 km) over two days.
- Project Hympulso is a Spanish initiative announced in 2024 and led by Talgo focused on the development of the world’s first hydrogen-powered high-speed train. Furthermore, the project seeks to analyze the feasibility to power Spain’s entire rail network, which represents the second largest high-speed network in the world.
- The Integral Coach factory, in association with the Indian railways, plans to convert one DHMU into a hydrogen fuel cell based train.It is planned to be rolled out in late 2025 and be used on the heritage Kalka-Shimla route.
- The Indian Railways has begun a series of tests for a Hydrogen train prototype in Jind, Haryana. Built with eight coaches, the hydrogen train reached a top speed of 70 km/h (43 mph) during its inaugural test run on March 2nd 2026.
- 17 July 2026: The Indian Prime Minister flagged off India's first indigenous hydrogen train between Jind and Sonipat covering 89 Km.

== Operating trains by country ==
=== India ===
India operates world's most powerful, longest and farthest travelling hydrogen train. It is a 10-car hydrogen fuel cell-based train set, powered by a 2x1200 kW hydrogen fuel cell propulsion system providing a 3,200 HP. Approved to operate at a maximum speed of 75 kmph with a design speed of 110 kmph. It has capacity of around 2,600 Passengers.

The first service operates between Jind–Sonipat section of the Northern Railway Zone covering a distance of 89 km. Its coaches are based on urban metro designs and are equipped with DC air-conditioning units, automatic doors, and a public announcement system.

India currently has World's largest electrified railway network(70,002 route kilometres), with 100% electrified routes. Few remaining Heritage Hilly trains running on diesel will be migrated to Hydrogen as part of National Hydrogen Mission. Under the "Hydrogen for Heritage" initiative, India plans to deploy 35 zero-emission, hydrogen-powered trains across vulnerable, scenic mountainous and heritage routes to preserve the ecological balance.

=== Germany ===
In September 2018, the world's first commercial hydrogen-powered passenger train entered service in Lower Saxony, Germany. The Alstom-developed train uses a zero-emission hydrogen fuel cell. In August 2022, the first rail line entirely run by hydrogen-powered trains debuted in Bremervörde, Lower Saxony, where the route's 15 diesel trains are being gradually replaced.

=== Japan ===
The FV-E991 series hydrogen train entered fare paying service in 2022 on the Tsurumi Line between Yokohama and Kawasaki, as a test service.

=== South Korea ===
In July 2024, 38 hydrogen fuel cell trams manufactured by Hyundai Rotem were selected to operate on Daejeon Metro Line 2. The supply contract has already been signed, and delivery is scheduled to begin in 2026. The line is expected to enter service in 2028.

=== United States ===
The first hydrogen train in the United States began operations on Arrow between San Bernardino and Redlands, California on September 13, 2025. The train runs through an area with poor air quality.

=== Canada ===
In 2024 and 2025 CPKC (Canadian Pacific Kansas City) Railway has introduced 3 new H_{2} locomotives into commercial operations as part of a long term pilot project to move to a carbon free locomotive fleet (with support from the Province of Alberta). A paper was produced for the province looking at the viability H_{2} powered locomotives. The conclusion was that it is a viable solution, and in fact as part of the report, it was concluded that battery powered heavy duty locomotives are just not practical for a variety of reasons, including the economics. As of mid 2025, CPKC continues to operate 3 types of H_{2} locomotives including one that has transitioned to commercial coal hauling using its highest power locomotive type (CP 1200). In May 2025 the company supplying the fuel cells announced further orders for CPKC for building out a further 4 CP 1200 sized locomotives for a total of 7 units (1 existing 1200, plus 2 smaller sized units).

== See also ==
- Battery electric multiple unit
- Combined cycle powered railway locomotive
- Fuel cell bus
- Hydrogen vehicle
- Hydrogen fuel cell power plant
- List of fuel cell vehicles
- Timeline of hydrogen technologies
