= KNMI =

KNMI may refer to:

- KNMI (FM), a radio station (88.9 FM) licensed to Farmington, New Mexico, United States
- Royal Netherlands Meteorological Institute (Dutch abbreviation: KNMI)
