= Lisa Sattenspiel =

Anthropologist

- Education: University of New Mexico
- Scientific career
- Thesis: The spread of disease in subdivided populations (1984)

Lisa Sattenspiel is an anthropologist at the University of Missouri known for her work on infectious diseases, their spread and ecology. She is an elected fellow of the American Association for the Advancement of Science.

== Education and career ==
Sattenspiel has a B.A. from Stanford University, and an M.S. (1979) and a Ph.D. from the University of New Mexico. For her Ph.D. she worked on disease transmission in heterogeneous populations. Following her Ph.D. she worked at the University of Michigan until her 1987 move to the University of Missouri. She was promoted to professor in 2003 and was promoted to chair of the department of anthropology in 2016.

== Research ==
Sattenspiel is known for her research into infectious diseases, their ecology, transmission, and effect on human populations. She has worked on the Spanish flu, influenza and measles in Canada, and epidemics in the Four Corners region of Arizona. Her early work modeled age structure of populations and the impact on spread of diseases. She has examined the transmission of diseases including HIV, measles, and influenza. Her research includes investigations into the impact of quarantines and vaccination strategies. In Newfoundland, she researched connections between absenteeism in schools and epidemics, and how social interactions impact the spread of infectious diseases. More recently, she has applied her past work on the Spanish flu to interpret the patterns from the COVID-19 pandemic in the state of Missouri.

== Selected publications ==
- Sattenspiel, Lisa (2009). The geographic spread of infectious diseases: models and applications. Alun Lloyd. Princeton: Princeton University Press. ISBN 978-1-4008-3170-8. OCLC 650310316.
- Sattenspiel, Lisa; Dietz, Klaus (1995-07-01). "A structured epidemic model incorporating geographic mobility among regions". Mathematical Biosciences. 128 (1): 71–91. doi:10.1016/0025-5564(94)00068-B. ISSN 0025-5564. PMID 7606146.
- Sattenspiel, Lisa; Harpending, Henry (1983). "Stable Populations and Skeletal Age". American Antiquity. 48 (3): 489–498. doi:10.2307/280557. ISSN 0002-7316. JSTOR 280557. S2CID 161551247.
- Sattenspiel, Lisa; Herring, D. Ann (2003-01-01). "Simulating the effect of quarantine on the spread of the 1918–19 flu in Central Canada". Bulletin of Mathematical Biology. 65 (1): 1–26. doi:10.1006/bulm.2002.0317. ISSN 1522-9602. PMID 12597114. S2CID 25567353.

== Awards and honors ==
Sattenspiel was elected a fellow of the American Association for the Advancement of Science in 2013.
