= KKDC =

- Dolores, Colorado; United States
- Frequency: 93.3 MHz
- Branding: The Crow

Programming
- Format: Album-oriented rock (AOR)
- Affiliations: United Stations Radio Networks

Ownership
- Owner: Four Corners Broadcasting LLC
- Sister stations: KIUP, KRSJ, KIQX

History
- First air date: October 21, 2003

Technical information
- Licensing authority: FCC
- Facility ID: 88574
- Class: C2
- ERP: 50,000 watts
- HAAT: 103 meters (338 ft)
- Transmitter coordinates: 37°27′59″N 108°31′28″W

Links
- Public license information: Public file; LMS
- Website: Official website

KKDC (93.3 FM) is a radio station licensed to Dolores, Colorado. Currently, the station carries an album-oriented rock (AOR) format and is owned by Four Corners Broadcasting LLC.

== Programming ==
Aside from rock music, the station carries local Dolores High School football from September through November and basketball from January through March.
