= KPRT =

KPRT may refer to:

- KPRT (AM), an AM radio station in Kansas City, Missouri, United States
- KPRT-FM, an FM radio station in Kirtland, New Mexico, United States
