= KPCL =

KPCL may refer to:

- Krishnapatnam Port
- Karnataka Power Corporation Limited
- KPCL (FM), a radio station (95.7 FM) licensed to Farmington, New Mexico, United States
