= KRSJ =

- Durango, Colorado; United States
- Broadcast area: Four Corners
- Frequency: 100.5 MHz
- Branding: 100.5 KRSJ

Programming
- Format: Country music
- Affiliations: Fox News Radio; Denver Broncos; Colorado Avalanche

Ownership
- Owner: Four Corners Broadcasting, LLC
- Sister stations: KIQX, KIUP, KKDC

Technical information
- Licensing authority: FCC
- Facility ID: 22036
- Class: C1
- ERP: 100,000 watts
- HAAT: 110 meters (360 ft)
- Transmitter coordinates: 37°15′47″N 107°53′46″W
- Translators: 104.9 K285BW (North La Plata Court); 104.9 K285AH (Aztec, Etc., New Mexico)

Links
- Public license information: Public file; LMS
- Webcast: Listen live
- Website: radiodurango.com/krsj

KRSJ (100.5 FM) is a radio station broadcasting a country music format. Licensed to Durango, Colorado, United States, the station serves the Four Corners area. First licensed in January 1973, KRSJ is currently owned by Four Corners Broadcasting, LLC and features programming from Fox News Radio and play-by-play of the Denver Broncos and the Colorado Avalanche.
