= Hydrogen fuel cell power plant =

Powerplant that uses hydrogen to generate electricity

A hydrogen fuel cell power plant is a type of fuel cell power plant (or station) which uses a hydrogen fuel cell to generate electricity for the power grid. They are larger in scale than backup generators such as the Bloom Energy Server and can be up to 60% efficient in converting hydrogen to electricity. There is little to no nitrous oxide produced in the fuel cell process, which is produced in the process of a combined cycle hydrogen power plant. If the hydrogen could be produced with electrolysis also known as green hydrogen, then this could be a solution to the energy storage problem of renewable energy.

== Shinincheon Bitdream Hydrogen Fuel Cell Power Plant ==
The Shinincheon Bitdream Hydrogen Fuel Cell Power Plant in Incheon, South Korea can produce 78.96 MegaWatts of power. It opened in 2021 and is one of the first large scale fuel cell power plants for the grid, rather than just a backup generator. The plant will also purify the air by sucking in 2.4 tons of fine dust per year and filtering it out of the air. It will also produce hot water as a by-product that will be used to heat houses locally, also known as district heating.

== Cogeneration or combined cycle ==
Fuel cells produce a lot of hot water and a cogeneration or combined cycle could be used for further benefit or to produce more electricity with a steam turbine, increasing the efficiency to >80% using a Phosphoric acid fuel cell.

== Water uses ==
Further studies are needed to see if the water is potable. Places that are dry and have water shortages could use the water for agriculture or other greywater uses. Another use would be to use the hot water by-product for High-temperature electrolysis for more hydrogen fuel.

== High temperature electrolysis at nuclear power plants ==
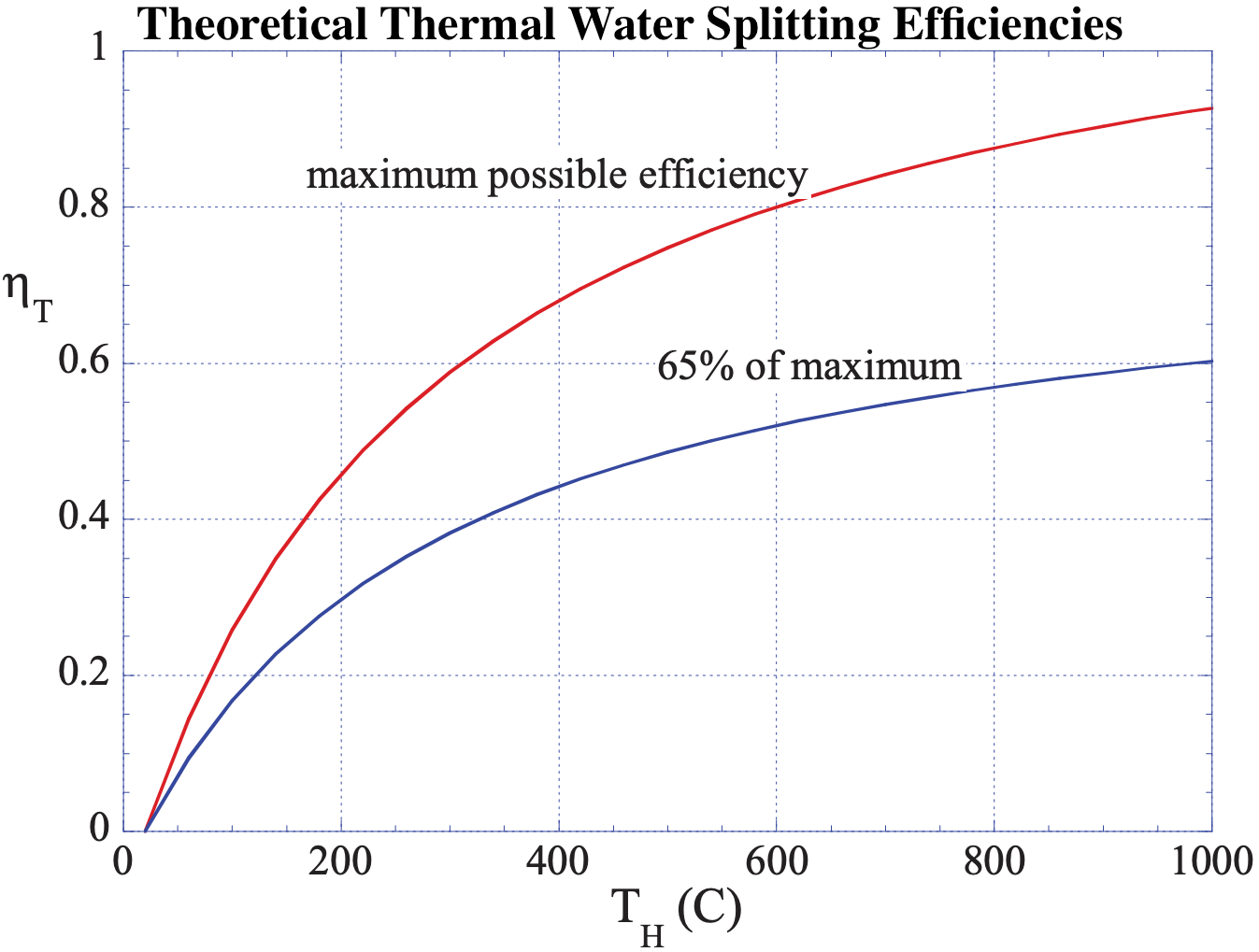
Theoretical thermal water splitting efficiencies. 60% efficient at 1000°C Steam reforming of hydrocarbons to hydrogen is 70-85% efficient

High-temperature electrolysis at nuclear power plants could produce hydrogen at scale and more efficiently. The DOE Office of Nuclear Energy has demonstration projects to test 3 nuclear facilities in the United States at:

- Nine Mile Point Nuclear Generating Station in Oswego, NY
- Davis–Besse Nuclear Power Station in Oak Harbor, Ohio
- Prairie Island Nuclear Power Plant in Red Wing, Minnesota

== See also ==
- Strategic natural gas reserve
- Comparison of fuel cell types
- Green energy
- Hydrogen economy
- Hydrogen fuel cell train
- Hydrogen fuel enhancement
- Hydrogen storage
- Underground hydrogen storage
- Blue hydrogen
- Intermountain Power Plant
- Smart grid
- Pumped-storage hydroelectricity
- Methanol economy
- Natural hydrogen
