= KLJH =

- Bayfield, Colorado; United States
- Broadcast area: Four Corners
- Frequency: 107.1 MHz
- Branding: Super Station 107.1 FM

Programming
- Format: Contemporary Inspirational
- Affiliations: Salem Communications

Ownership
- Owner: Native American Christian Voice, Inc.
- Sister stations: KPCL, KTGW

Technical information
- Licensing authority: FCC
- Facility ID: 78212
- Class: C
- ERP: 100,000 watts
- HAAT: 574 meters (1,883 ft)
- Transmitter coordinates: 37°21′46″N 107°47′40″W
- Translators: (103.9 MHz) K280FL (Aztec, NM) (107.9 MHz) K300BN (Mancos)

Links
- Public license information: Public file; LMS
- Webcast: Listen live
- Website: Official website

KLJH (107.1 FM) is a radio station broadcasting a Contemporary Inspirational format. Licensed to Bayfield, Colorado, United States, the station serves the Four Corners area. The station is currently owned by Native American Christian Voice, Inc., and features programming from Salem Communications.
