= Hyundai Rotem Hydrogen Fuel cell Tram =

Electric tram by Hyundai Rotem

Hydrogen Fuel cell Tram
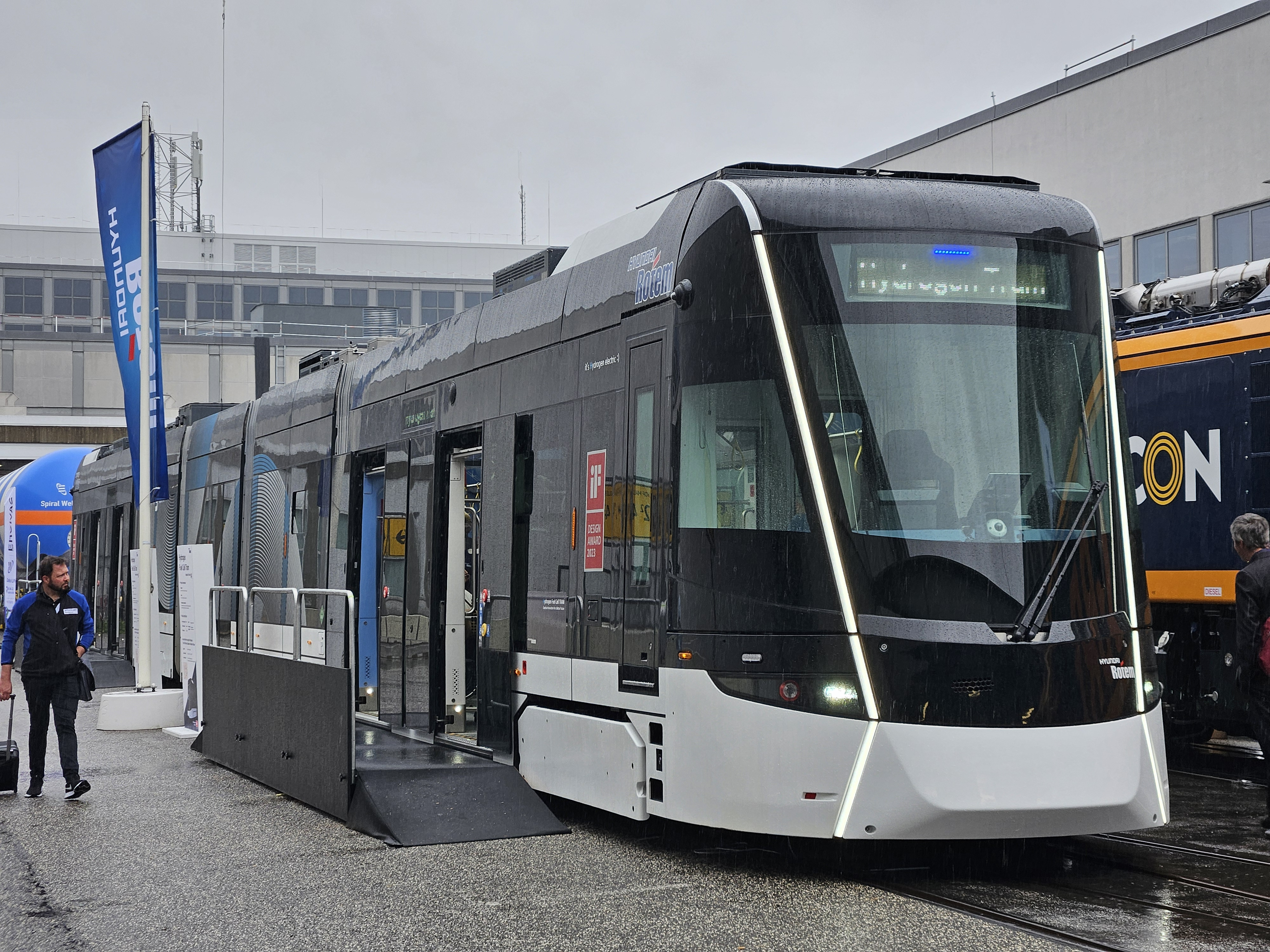
- Tram train on Innotrans trade fair in Berlin, 2024
- Manufacturer: Hyundai Rotem
- Built at: Changwon, South Gyeongsang Province
- Capacity: 225—305

Specifications
- Train length: five cars, 35 m (114 ft 9 15/16 in)
- Width: 2,650 mm (8 ft 8 5/16 in)
- Height: 4,000 mm (13 ft 1 1/2 in)
- Maximum speed: 60–70 km/h (37–43 mph)

Hydrogen Fuel cell Tram (Korean: 수소전기트램) is an hydrogen electric tram manufactured by Hyundai Rotem.

== Technology ==
Hydrogen Fuel cell Tram is a hydrogen electric tram that uses hydrogen to generate electricity. Its power source is electricity generated by a fuel cell, which supplies oxygen from the air to the hydrogen stored in the vehicle's rooftop hydrogen tank. It can travel over 200 km on a single charge and does not require external power supply facilities, such as large-scale power supply and substation facilities. It is constructed entirely without cables, eliminating the need for power lines within the city. Furthermore, it can be operated simply by laying tracks, allowing for flexible, cost-effective expansion of the route in the future.

It does not emit pollutants, so they effectively purify fine dust and improve air quality during operation. The 34 trains used on Daejeon Metro Line 2, operating for 19 hours, produce enough clean air to consume approximately 110,000 people in one hour.

== Operations ==
In July 2024, Daejeon City ordered 34 trains for Daejeon Metro Line 2. Operation is scheduled to start in 2028. It is also scheduled to be used as rolling stock for Ulsan Metro Line 1, the first urban railway line in Ulsan. In March 2026, Ulsan City signed a contract with Hyundai Rotem to manufacture nine train sets.
