= Namo Green Rail =

Hydrogen fuel cell electric train type

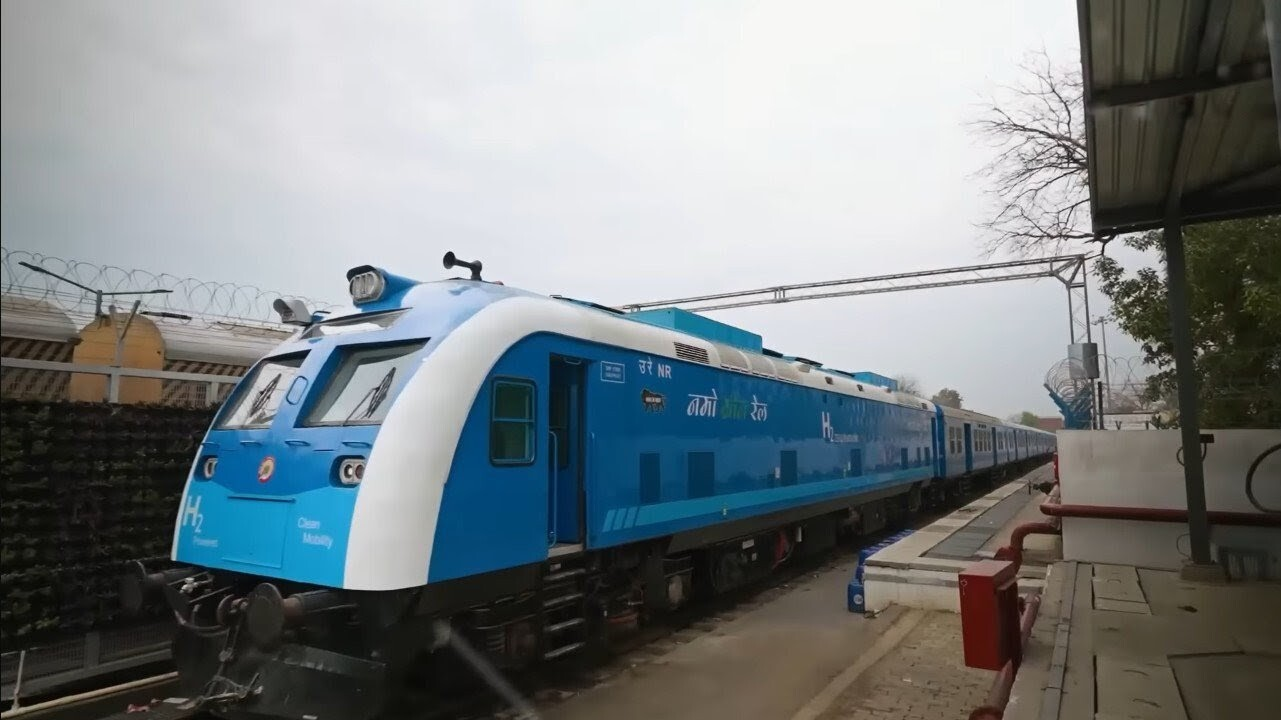
- In service: 17 July 2026
- Manufacturer: Integral Coach Factory (ICF)
- Built at: ICF, Chennai
- Family name: Zero Emission Multiple Unit (ZEMU)
- Replaced: Diesel Electric Multiple Unit (DEMU)
- Constructed: 2024
- Entered service: July 17, 2026 – present
- Number built: 1 set (10 cars)
- Number in service: 1
- Formation: 10 cars (2 driving power cars + 8 passenger cars)
- Fleet numbers: 1
- Capacity: 2,600 (total); 682 (seated)
- Operator: Indian Railways
- Depot: Shakurbasti (maintenance)
- Line served: Jind–Sonipat line

Specifications
- Maximum speed: 120 km/h (75 mph) (design); 75 km/h (47 mph) (operational)
- Prime mover: Electric Engine powered by Hydrogen Fuel Cells
- Power output: 2,400 kW (total)
- Transmission: Hydrogen Powered
- Power supply: Hydrogen fuel cell (1,200 kW propulsion system)
- Safety systems: Leak/flame detectors, 24x7 monitoring
- Coupling system: CBC Coupling
- Track gauge: 1,676 mm (5 ft 6 in)

The Namo Green Rail is a Hydrogen Train based on hydrogen fuel cell electric multiple unit (EMU) train type developed by the state-owned Integral Coach Factory (ICF) for the Indian Railways.

This train features two Power Cars positioned at either end of the 10-coach trainset (one at the front and one at the back). The eight passenger coaches are located in the middle and have a total capacity of 2600 passengers. The total traction capacity stands at 2,400 kW (approximately 3,200 hp), as each power car can generate 1,200 kw of power each . At peak capacity the train is expected to use around 300 kg of hydrogen each day.

The train operates on the 89-km Jind–Sonipat section in Haryana under the Northern Railways. The first test run took place on March 2, 2026, on this route.

== Fuel cell system ==
This series is equipped with a hybrid system that uses hydrogen as fuel and an electric battery as a power source. It works by generating electricity with compressed hydrogen (stored in the train) and oxygen (from the air). This electricity is then stored on batteries to power the electric motors and other systems of the train. Fuel cell vehicles only emit water and heat, so they are considered Zero emission vehicles (ZEV).

The main goal of this project is to create sustainable modes of transportation which can be used on heritage lines where installing OHE can damage the fragile ecosystem. Furthermore, the project aims to create rolling stock that operates using clean energy, such as hydrogen, to minimize environmental impact. Hydrogen does not emit carbon dioxide or any other polluting substance into the atmosphere and can be produced using renewable energy, which will help to curb global warming, preserve historical rail routes, and diversify energy sources for Indian Railways

== Design ==
Based on the design of S13 ICF coaches which were often exported to countries like Sri Lanka, the design of the train conveys a traditional Indian train aesthetic while maintaining a modern, futuristic image. The train is painted in a blue pattern, showing the connection between the rail heritage and the clean water generated as the only emission from the fuel cell device. The train has the Namo Green Rail logo on the front and another on the side in the middle of the train, at the junction between cars. This logo represents the introduction of sustainable energy for vehicles as a new beginning for the rail network on the land.
