= Natural hydrogen =

Molecular hydrogen naturally occurring on Earth

Natural hydrogen (also known as white hydrogen, geologic hydrogen, geogenic hydrogen, or gold hydrogen) is molecular hydrogen present on Earth that is formed by natural processes, as opposed to hydrogen produced in a laboratory or in industry. Modelling suggests that sufficient natural hydrogen exists to meet humanity's demand for thousands of years; however, most of it cannot be extracted economically. Natural hydrogen has been identified in many source rocks in areas beyond the sedimentary basins where oil companies typically operate. As of 2026, only one natural hydrogen well has been exploited, supplying gas to generate electricity for a village in Mali, but exploration and research projects are underway in many countries worldwide.

== History ==
=== Early theories and findings ===
Vladimir N. Larin developed the Primordially Hydridic Earth (PHE) concept in his 1975 work Hydridic Earth: The New Geology of Our Primordially Hydrogen-rich Planet (translated in 1993), which suggests that hydrogen, which used to be abundant in the interior of the planet, played a vital role in the evolution of Earth, and described a deep-seated natural hydrogen prominence. However, modern geochemists have challenged the PHE theory, citing geochemical studies of known hydrogen fields that suggest crustal reactions between water and rocks, particularly serpentinisation and radiolysis, rather than any primordial origin.

Samples taken from an oil well east of the town of Robe, South Australia in 1915 had a hydrogen concentration of around 25 per cent. Also in South Australia in the 1930s, oil well drillers reported finding "vast amounts of high-purity hydrogen". At the time, it was viewed as a useless byproduct of the oil drilling industry, and no efforts were made to capture it.

=== Mali (2012) ===
In 1987, in the village of Bourakebougou in the Koulikoro Region of Mali, Africa, a worker attempted to light his cigarette next to a certain water well. The well unexpectedly caught fire, and it was determined that the flames were produced by natural hydrogen seeping out of the well. A local petroleum company, Petroma Inc., was created in 2006. Working with international partners, it was found that the hydrogen existed as a gas. Exploration, research, and drilling were done, with a pilot project commencing in 2012. Further international collaborations followed, and the company was renamed Hydroma in 2019. In 2021, Hydroma started working with the Fraunhofer Institute in Germany and has been exploring the possibility of exporting natural hydrogen to Germany. Since 2012, the well has produced enough hydrogen to provide electricity for the whole village, with a slight increase in pressure after 11 years of operation, rather than declining, as with other conventional sources of oil and gas.

=== Elsewhere (2020s) ===
During the 2020s, interest in natural hydrogen has increased, and investments have been made to develop natural hydrogen wells in several countries. The first H-NAT Summit, the first world summit on natural hydrogen, was held in Perth, Western Australia, as well as online, on 27-28 November 2023. After the 2025 event in Paris, France, hosted more than 500 leaders from over 40 nationalities, the 2026 edition is to be held in November 2026. Major international reviews of the topic were published by the Royal Society of London in 2025 and the Leopoldina German National Academy of Sciences in 2026.

== Description and naming ==
Natural hydrogen is molecular hydrogen present on Earth that is formed by natural processes, as opposed to hydrogen produced in a laboratory or in industry. It is also known as white hydrogen, geologic hydrogen, geological hydrogen, geogenic hydrogen, or gold hydrogen.

It is possible that natural hydrogen is a form of renewable energy, as the Earth may generate hundreds of millions of tons of it each year; however, more studies showing the rate of accumulation vs leakages need to be produced.

== Geology ==
Natural hydrogen is generated from various sources. Sources of natural hydrogen may include:

- primordial H_{2}, present at the creation of the solar system in the Earth's mantle or even its core, (per Larin et al. and Zgonnik, 2020) degassing over time
- reaction of water with ultramafic rocks (serpentinisation)
- natural water radiolysis
- biological activity
- weathering – water in contact with freshly exposed rock surfaces
- decomposition of hydroxyl ions in the structure of minerals
- decomposition of organic matter

Many hydrogen emissions have been identified on mid-ocean ridges. Serpentinisation occurs frequently in the oceanic crust; many targets for exploration include portions of oceanic crust (ophiolites) which have been obducted and incorporated into continental crust. Aulacogens such as the Midcontinent Rift System of North America are also viable sources of rocks which may undergo serpentinisation. Reactions between water and rocks in the earth's crust, particularly serpentinisation and radiolysis, rather than any primordial origin, have been posited as the most likely sources of natural hydrogen.

Mantle hydrogen and hydrogen from water radiolysis or from bacterial activity are under investigation. In France, the Alps and Pyrenees are suitable for exploitation. New Caledonia has hyperalkaline sources that show hydrogen emissions.

Hydrogen is soluble in fresh water, especially at moderate depths in the Earth's crust, as solubility increases with pressure. However, at greater depths, temperatures and pressures, such as within the Earth's mantle, the solubility decreases due to the highly asymmetric nature of mixtures of hydrogen and water.

== Current sources and projects ==
Modelling suggests that sufficient natural hydrogen exists to meet humanity's demand for thousands of years; however, most of it cannot be extracted economically. Natural hydrogen has been identified in many source rocks in areas beyond the sedimentary basins where oil companies typically operate.

As of 2023, there were 25 wells in the village of Bourakebougou, Mali, of which only one was used to produce electricity. This one produces around 50,000 ft^{3} (1,400 m^{3}) of gas per day, which powers its 1,500 inhabitants. As of 2026 the Malian hydrogen well remains the world's first and only economically successful hydrogen well. H_{2} concentration is more than 95%.

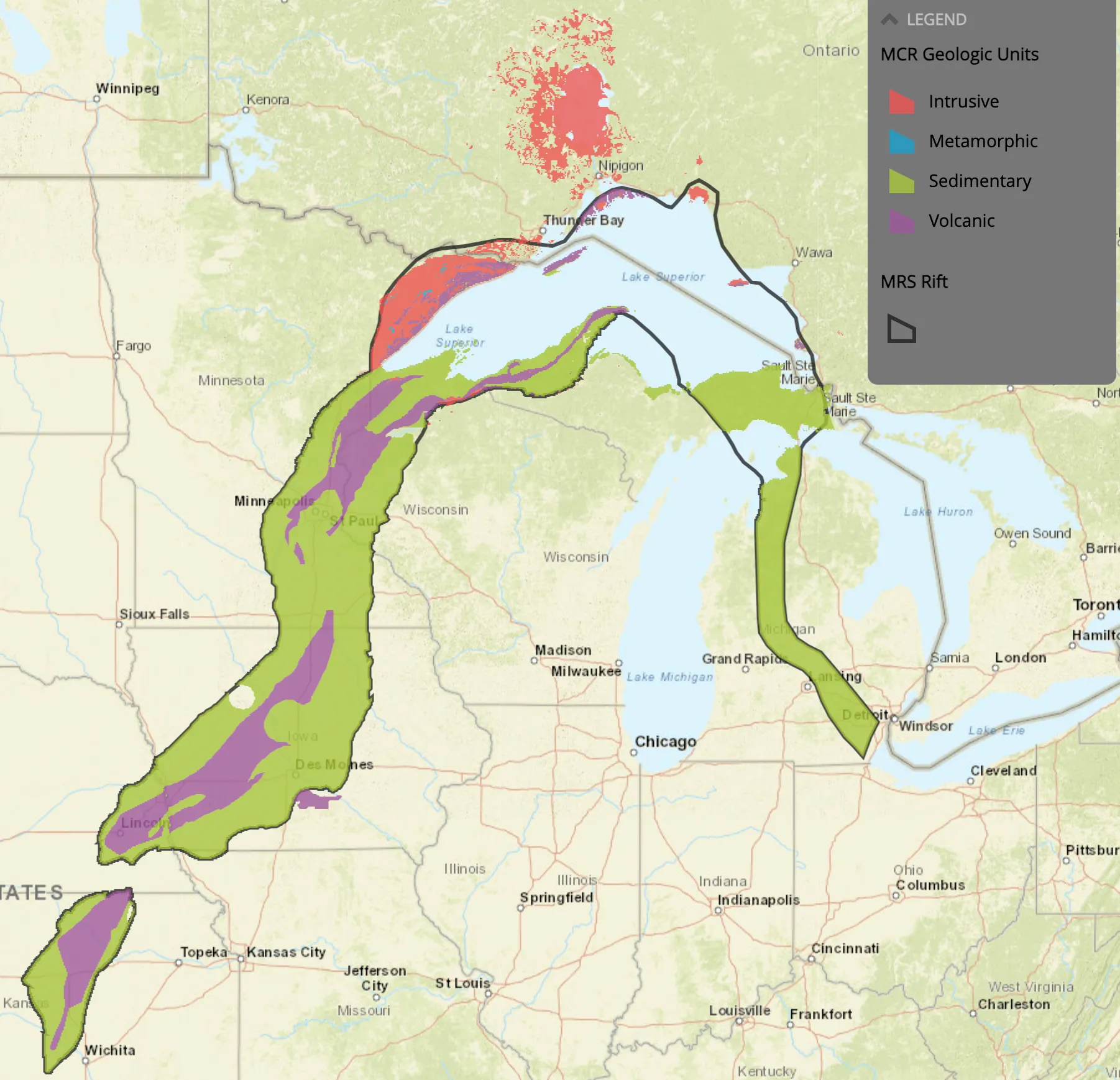
Mid-continental Rift System through the middle of North America

According to the Financial Times, there are 5 trillion tons of natural hydrogen resources worldwide. Resources have been identified in 10–15 countries, including France, US, Canada, eastern Europe, Russia, Australia, Oman, and Mali. In France, petroleum company Française de l'Énergie has said that it aims to begin extracting hydrogen by 2027 or 2028.

It was reported in 2018 that geologic hydrogen could be found or produced at scale in the Midcontinent Rift System that runs down the middle of North America. Water could be pumped down to hot iron(II)-rich rock to produce hydrogen for extraction. Dissolving carbon dioxide in these fluids could allow for simultaneous carbon sequestration through carbonation of the rocks. The resulting hydrogen would be produced via a carbon-negative pathway and is referred to as "orange" hydrogen. In 2023, Pironon and de Donato (University of Lorraine, Nancy, France) announced the discovery of a deposit in Lorraine (East of France), which they estimated at 46-260 million metric tons (several years' worth of 2020s production).

In 2024, a natural deposit of helium and hydrogen was discovered in Rukwa, Tanzania, as well in Bulqizë, Albania. The longest record of natural hydrogen discharges sustained for up to ten years, with hydrogen concentrations up to 17% by volume, was discovered in Timmins, Ontario, Canada, from an active mine.. The abundance of mines in rocks of hydrogen-producing potential around the world suggests these settings in Precambrian continental rock may be a novel source of economic hydrogen.

Exploration is underway in the mountains of Oman, where it is generated naturally underground.

In South Australia, several companies have obtained exploration licences, including in the Otway Basin in the state's south-east. The company Gold Hydrogen have found hydrogen with a 97 per cent purity on the Yorke Peninsula, but its viability has yet to be proven.

"Stimulated geologic hydrogen" or "engineered hydrogen" could be produced by injecting water into iron-rich rock oxidizing iron and releasing hydrogen. This can be enhanced by fracturing the rock to enable water to reach more of the iron.

== See also ==
- Pure-play helium
- Electrofuel
- Hydrogen economy
- Hydrogen production
- Combined cycle hydrogen power plant
- Hydrogen fuel cell power plant
- List of geology journals
