= KVFC =

- Cortez, Colorado; United States
- Frequency: 740 kHz

Programming
- Format: Talk radio
- Affiliations: Fox News Radio; Compass Media Networks; Premiere Networks; Westwood One

Ownership
- Owner: Hutton Broadcasting, LLC
- Sister stations: KENN, KRTZ

Technical information
- Licensing authority: FCC
- Facility ID: 16434
- Class: B
- Power: 1,000 watts (day); 250 watts (night)
- Transmitter coordinates: 37°20′58″N 108°32′29″W
- Translator: 92.3 K222AD (Cortez)

Links
- Public license information: Public file; LMS
- Webcast: Listen live
- Website: kvfcradio.com

KVFC (740 AM) is a radio station licensed to Cortez, Colorado, United States, broadcasting a talk radio format. KVFC was among the first radio stations in the Four Corners Region, first licensed in 1955 to Cortez businessman Jack Hawkins. Today, KVFC-AM is located on Hawkins Street in Cortez, named after the station's founder. The station is currently owned by Hutton Broadcasting, LLC.

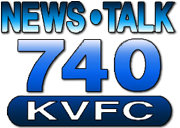
KVFC Previous Logo
