= KNMI (FM) =

- Farmington, New Mexico; United States
- Broadcast area: Four Corners area
- Frequency: 88.9 MHz

Programming
- Format: Contemporary Christian
- Network: K-Love

Ownership
- Owner: Educational Media Foundation

History
- First air date: March 6, 1980
- Call sign meaning: Original owner Navajo Missions, Incorporated

Technical information
- Licensing authority: FCC
- Facility ID: 47890
- Class: C2
- ERP: 27,000 watts (vertical)
- HAAT: 202 meters (663 feet)
- Transmitter coordinates: 36°40′16″N 108°13′54″W

Links
- Public license information: Public file; LMS
- Webcast: Listen Live
- Website: klove.com

KNMI (88.9 MHz) is a non-commercial FM radio station licensed to the community of Farmington, New Mexico, United States. The station is owned by Educational Media Foundation.

KNMI broadcasts a Contemporary Christian music format to the Four Corners area. It was the first Christian radio station in the Four Corners area.

== History ==
This station received its original construction permit from the Federal Communications Commission on August 3, 1979. The new station was assigned the call letters KNMI by the FCC on August 3, 1979. KNMI began regular broadcasting on March 6, 1980, and received its license to cover from the FCC on October 6, 1980.

Former logo

On April 16, 2021, Navajo Ministries filed to sell KNMI and its dependent translators to the Educational Media Foundation for $225,000. The sale was consummated on May 27, 2021.

== Translators ==
In addition to the main station, KNMI is relayed by an additional two broadcast translators to widen its coverage area.

| Call sign | Frequency | City of license | FID | ERP (W) | Class | FCC info |
|---|---|---|---|---|---|---|
| K269HG | 101.7 FM | Cortez, etc., Colorado | 47891 | 7 | D | LMS |
| K215AX | 90.9 FM | Pagosa Springs, Colorado | 47892 | 38 | D | LMS |
