= KTGW =

Fruitland, New Mexico; United States
- Broadcast area: Farmington, New Mexico
- Frequency: 91.7 MHz
- Branding: The Word

Programming
- Format: Christian Radio

Ownership
- Owner: Native American Christian Voice, Inc.
- Sister stations: KLJH, KPCL

Technical information
- Licensing authority: FCC
- Facility ID: 89170
- Class: C3
- ERP: 12,000 watts
- HAAT: 116 meters (381 ft)
- Transmitter coordinates: 36°41′46″N 108°13′15.3″W
- Translator: (103.1 MHz) K276FV (Silverton)

Links
- Public license information: Public file; LMS
- Webcast: Listen Live
- Website: Official website

KTGW (91.7 FM) is a Christian radio station licensed to Fruitland, New Mexico, serving the Farmington, New Mexico Area. The station is owned by Native American Christian Voice, Inc.
