= KPTE =

- Bayfield, Colorado; United States
- Broadcast area: Durango, Colorado area
- Frequency: 92.9 MHz
- Branding: 92.9 The Point

Programming
- Format: Adult contemporary

Ownership
- Owner: Hutton Broadcasting, LLC
- Sister stations: KDGO, KKDG

History
- First air date: 2008 (as KAYF at 92.5)
- Former call signs: KAYF (2007–2013); KKDG (2013–2014)
- Former frequencies: 92.5 MHz (2008–2014)
- Call sign meaning: K PoinT E

Technical information
- Licensing authority: FCC
- Facility ID: 164121
- Class: C2
- ERP: 9,200 watts
- HAAT: 344 meters (1,129 ft)
- Transmitter coordinates: 37°20′21″N 107°49′25″W

Links
- Public license information: Public file; LMS
- Webcast: Listen Live
- Website: 929thepoint.com

KPTE (92.9 FM, "92.9 The Point") is a radio station that is licensed to Durango, Colorado and serves the Four Corners area. The station is owned by Hutton Broadcasting, LLC and broadcasts an adult contemporary music format.

The station took on the former branding of its sister station KKDG, which used to be called "The Point". KPTE and its sister station KRWN swapped frequencies in May 2014, coinciding with the launch of the new branding, with KRWN moving to 92.5 FM and KPTE moving to 92.9 FM.
