= KRWN =

Coordinates: 36.696°N 108.224°W

- Farmington, New Mexico; United States
- Broadcast area: Four Corners
- Frequency: 92.5 MHz
- Branding: 92.5 KRWN

Programming
- Format: Classic rock
- Affiliations: United Stations Radio Networks

Ownership
- Owner: Hutton Broadcasting, LLC
- Sister stations: KENN, KISZ-FM

History
- First air date: 1989 (at 92.9)
- Former frequencies: 92.9 MHz (1989–2014)
- Call sign meaning: Phonetic spelling of "crown" without the vowel, significance of the name is unknown

Technical information
- Licensing authority: FCC
- Facility ID: 47096
- Class: C1
- ERP: 62,000 watts
- HAAT: 120 meters (390 ft)

Links
- Public license information: Public file; LMS
- Webcast: Listen live
- Website: KRWN Online

KRWN (92.5 FM) is a radio station with a classic rock format. It is licensed to Farmington, New Mexico serving the Four Corners area.

KRWN started out in 1989 as a top 40 radio station. It then moved to active rock, then to a mainstream rock format. In the 2010s the station transitioned to classic rock as competitor KDAG took KRWNs active rock selections. Through the format changes KRWN remained the mass appeal radio station for the four corners.

According to its website, it is the top-rated station in the area according to an audience survey taken in the fall of 2005.
