= KRTZ =

- Cortez, Colorado; United States
- Broadcast area: Four Corners
- Frequency: 98.7 MHz
- Branding: FM 98.7 KRTZ

Programming
- Format: Adult contemporary
- Affiliations: Compass Media Networks; Premiere Networks; United Stations Radio Networks; Westwood One

Ownership
- Owner: American General Media; (Winton Road Broadcasting, LLC)
- Sister stations: KVFC

History
- First air date: December 1981
- Call sign meaning: Cortez

Technical information
- Licensing authority: FCC
- Facility ID: 16435
- Class: C
- ERP: 27,000 watts
- HAAT: 884 meters (2,900 ft)
- Transmitter coordinates: 37°13′10″N 108°48′26″W

Links
- Public license information: Public file; LMS
- Webcast: Listen live
- Website: krtzradio.com

KRTZ (98.7 FM) is a radio station broadcasting an adult contemporary format. Licensed to Cortez, Colorado, United States, the station serves the Four Corners area. The station is currently owned by Winton Road Broadcasting, LLC.
