= Pure-play helium =

Pure-play helium, also known as primary helium or green helium, is helium that is extracted from the earth as the main product. Since the early 20th century, most of the world's helium supply has been extracted from natural gas as part of the nitrogen rejection process. The preference for primary helium is driven by the planned reduction in use of natural gas, and instabilities in the supply of helium.

== Occurrence ==
To accumulate to an exploitable reservoir, helium must be trapped by a non-porous rock. It is usually accompanied by a larger amount of nitrogen.

== Exploration ==
In North America, most exploration activity centres on the Four Corners region, where the borders of the states of Arizona, Colorado, New Mexico and Utah intersect.

== Resources ==
Exploration in Tanzania shows reserves of 138 billion cubic feet.

Grand Gulf Energy is drilling in the Leadville Dolomite Formation in Utah.
