= Dishaba mine =

Platinum mine in Thabazimbi, Limpopo, South Africa

- Location within South Africa

Location
- Location: Thabazimbi, Limpopo, South Africa; 24°45′30.6″S 27°23′26.16″E

Production
- Products: platinum, palladium, rhodium, ruthenium, gold

Owner
- Company: Anglo American Platinum

The Dishaba mine is a large open pit mine located in the north-western part of South Africa in Thabazimbi, Limpopo. Tumela represents one of the largest platinum reserves in South Africa having estimated reserves of 24.6 million oz of platinum. The mine produces around 160,000 oz of platinum/year.
