= TAG Corner =

Coordinates: 34.9847°N 85.6052°W

TAG Corner (or simply TAG: Tennessee, Alabama, and Georgia) is a name for the region where the U.S. states of Tennessee, Alabama, and Georgia come together. It is a mountainous area dominated by the Cumberland Plateau and Lookout Mountain, with elevations ranging up to 2,000 feet (610 meters). The major routes of travel through the region are Interstate 59 and US 11, which follow a valley connecting Gadsden, Alabama in the southwest of the region with Chattanooga, Tennessee in the northeast.

These routes cross a corner of Georgia (centered on the town of Trenton), which, because of the terrain, was only accessible by way of Tennessee or Alabama until 1939. One also crosses this corner of Georgia briefly when traveling "west" from Chattanooga to Nashville on Interstate 24.

The term TAG Corner seems to find the most use among devotees of caving, although cavers usually just call the area "TAG". Because of the limestone geology of the Cumberland Plateau, the area is one of the finest for caving in the United States. TAG is especially known for vertical caving due to the depth of many of the caves.

The abbreviation may have originally been used by the TAG Line, a railroad which operated in the region from 1892 to 1971. It may also come from a group of cavers calling themselves TAG in the 1960s.
