= KPCL (FM) =

- Farmington, New Mexico; United States
- Broadcast area: Farmington, New Mexico; Durango, Colorado
- Frequency: 95.7 MHz
- Branding: Passion Radio

Programming
- Format: Christian radio

Ownership
- Owner: Native American Christian Voice, Inc.
- Sister stations: KLJH, KTGW

Technical information
- Licensing authority: FCC
- Facility ID: 70444
- Class: C1
- ERP: 26,500 watts
- HAAT: 313 meters (1,027 ft)
- Transmitter coordinates: 36°48′53″N 107°53′31″W

Links
- Public license information: Public file; LMS
- Webcast: Listen live
- Website: passionradio.org/stations/kpcl-95-7

KPCL (95.7 FM) is a Christian radio station licensed to Farmington, New Mexico, serving the areas of Farmington, New Mexico and Durango, Colorado. The station is owned by Native American Christian Voice, Inc.
