= KKDG =

- Durango, Colorado; United States
- Broadcast area: Four Corners
- Frequency: 99.7 MHz
- Branding: Radio Free Durango

Programming
- Format: Adult album alternative

Ownership
- Owner: Hutton Broadcasting, LLC
- Sister stations: KDGO, KPTE

History
- First air date: July 1, 1995 (as KWXA)
- Former call signs: KWXA (1992–1998); KPTE (1998–2014)
- Call sign meaning: DuranGo

Technical information
- Licensing authority: FCC
- Facility ID: 8779
- Class: C2
- ERP: 9,200 watts
- HAAT: 344 meters (1,129 ft)
- Transmitter coordinates: 37°20′21″N 107°49′25″W
- Translator: 92.3 K222CP (Durango)

Links
- Public license information: Public file; LMS
- Webcast: Listen live
- Website: KKDG Online

KKDG (99.7 FM) is a commercial radio station that is licensed to Durango, Colorado and serves the Four Corners area. The station is currently owned by Hutton Broadcasting, LLC and is airing an adult album alternative format.

== History ==
The station was assigned the call letters KWXA on July 2, 1992. On April 10, 1998, the station became KPTE, then became the current KKDG on January 29, 2014.

On September 26, 2024, KKDG dropped its top 40/CHR format and began stunting as "99.7 Doggy FM" with music for and about dogs.

On October 3, 2024, KKDG was officially relaunched as Radio Free Durango with an adult album alternative format.
