= KDGO =

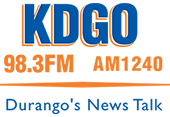
- Durango, Colorado; United States
- Broadcast area: Four Corners
- Frequency: 1240 kHz
- Branding: KDGO 98.3FM AM1240

Programming
- Format: News Talk Information
- Affiliations: Fox News Radio; Premiere Networks; Westwood One

Ownership
- Owner: Hutton Broadcasting, LLC
- Sister stations: KKDG, KPTE

History
- First air date: May 1958
- Call sign meaning: K DuranGO

Technical information
- Licensing authority: FCC
- Facility ID: 55657
- Class: C
- Power: 1,000 watts unlimited
- Transmitter coordinates: 37°18′18″N 107°51′25″W

Links
- Public license information: Public file; LMS
- Webcast: Listen live
- Website: kdgoradio.com

KDGO (1240 AM) is a radio station broadcasting a News Talk Information format. Licensed to Durango, Colorado, United States, the station serves the Four Corners area. It is currently owned by Hutton Broadcasting, LLC and features programming from Fox News Radio, Premiere Networks, and Westwood One.

== FM translator ==
KDGO also relays its signal to an FM translator broadcasting on 98.3 MHz.

Broadcast translator for KDGO
Call sign	Frequency	City of license	FID	ERP (W)	Class	FCC info
K252FJ	98.3 FM	Durango, Colorado	76343	110	D	LMS
