= KIUP =

- Durango, Colorado; United States
- Broadcast area: Four Corners area
- Frequency: 930 kHz
- Branding: Durango's ESPN Radio

Programming
- Format: Sports
- Affiliations: ESPN Radio

Ownership
- Owner: Four Corners Broadcasting, LLC

History
- First air date: December 10, 1935

Technical information
- Licensing authority: FCC
- Facility ID: 22039
- Class: D
- Power: 5,000 watts (day); 100 watts (night)
- Transmitter coordinates: 37°18′18″N 107°51′25″W
- Translators: 97.3 K247AU (Durango); 106.3 K292GX (Durango)

Links
- Public license information: Public file; LMS
- Website: radiodurango.com/kiup

KIUP (930 AM) is a radio station broadcasting a sports format. Licensed to Durango, Colorado, United States, the station serves the Four Corners area. The station is currently owned by Four Corners Broadcasting, LLC and features programming from ESPN Radio.

== History ==
KIUP was first authorized in 1935. The call sign was randomly assigned from an alphabetical list of available call letters.
