= Four Corners =

Region where four US states meet at a point

The Four Corners region is the red circle in this map. The Four Corners states are highlighted in orange.

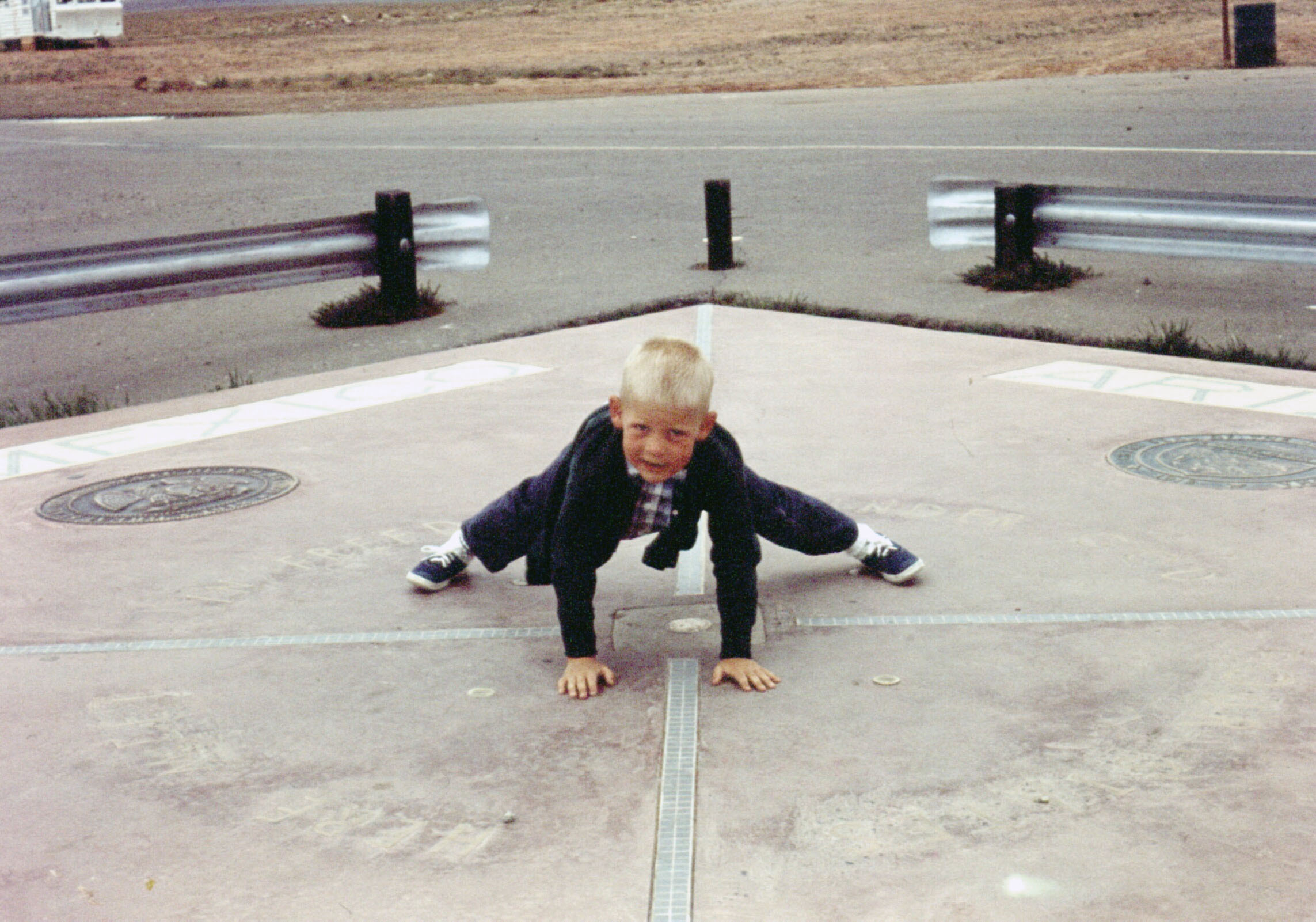
A child straddling on all four states, 1965

The Four Corners is a region of the Southwestern United States consisting of the southwestern corner of Colorado, southeastern corner of Utah, northeastern corner of Arizona, and northwestern corner of New Mexico. Most of the Four Corners region belongs to semi-autonomous Native American nations, the largest of which is the Navajo Nation, followed by Hopi, Ute, and Zuni tribal reserves and nations. The Four Corners region is part of a larger region known as the Colorado Plateau and is mostly rural, rugged, and arid. The largest state in the region is New Mexico, which is the fifth-largest state of the fifty states.

The Four Corners area is named after the quadripoint at the intersection of approximately 37° north latitude with 109° 03′ west longitude, where the boundaries of the four states meet, and is marked by the Four Corners Monument. It is the only location in the United States where four states meet. In addition to the monument, commonly visited areas within Four Corners include Monument Valley, Mesa Verde National Park, Chaco Canyon, Canyons of the Ancients National Monument and Canyon de Chelly National Monument. The most populous city in the Four Corners region is Farmington, New Mexico, followed by Durango, Colorado.

== Prehistory and Indigenous history ==
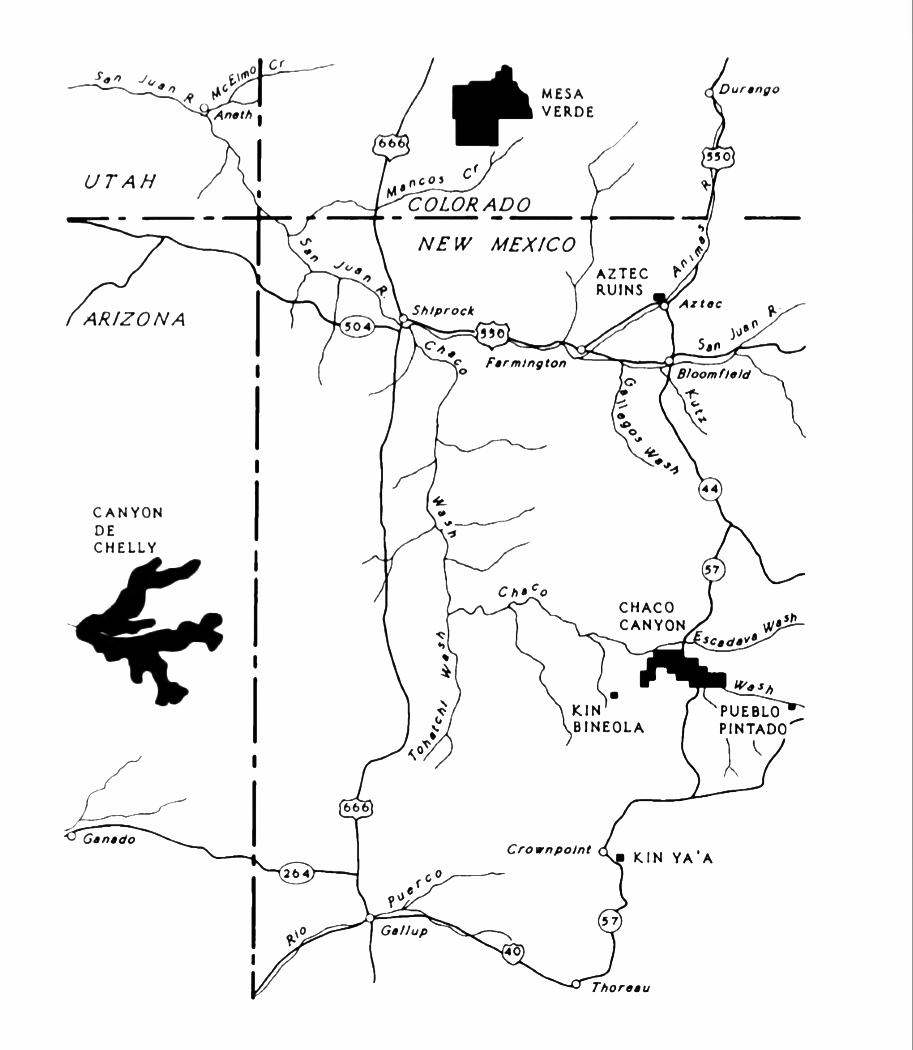
Major Ancestral Puebloan sites in the Four Corners area

Paulette F. C. Steeves, in The Indigenous Paleolithic of the Western Hemisphere, argues for a significantly earlier Indigenous presence in North America than is usually considered the case, supported by archaeological evidence and Indigenous oral histories. Her work challenges long-held assumptions about the timing and nature of human migration into the Americas.

By the time of European contact, the region was home to complex societies such as the Ancestral Puebloans, known for their cliff dwellings, kivas, and extensive trade networks. Charles C. Mann, in 1491: New Revelations of the Americas Before Columbus, highlights the sophisticated agricultural, political, and spiritual systems present across the Americas before colonization. Craig Childs, in House of Rain: Tracking a Vanished Civilization Across the American Southwest, retraces ancient migration routes and settlements in the Southwest, offering insights into how the environment and cultural memory shaped the lives of the people who lived in the Four Corners. His work reveals that the land itself holds clues to long-standing Indigenous relationships with place, ceremony, and survival in an arid and challenging landscape.

== History ==
The United States acquired the Four Corners region from Mexico after the end of the Mexican–American War in 1848. In 1863 Congress created the Arizona Territory from the western part of New Mexico Territory. The boundary was legally defined as a line running due south from the southwest corner of Colorado Territory, which had been created in 1861. This was an unusual act of Congress, which almost always defined the boundaries of new territories as lines of latitude or longitude, or following rivers, but seldom as extensions of other boundaries.

By defining one boundary as starting at the corner of another, Congress ensured the eventual creation of four states meeting at a point, regardless of the inevitable errors of boundary surveying. The area was first surveyed by the US Government in 1868 as part of an effort to make Colorado Territory into a state, the first of the Four Corners states formed. While the US Congress in 1863 intended the corners of Colorado to be placed at the intersections of lines of specific latitude and longitude, due to a "standard" survey error of the time, the originally surveyed location of the "Four Corners" point, along with the corresponding survey marker, was unintentionally placed by its initial surveyor 1,821 feet (555 m) east of the intended location.

In 1925, some 57 years after Congress had first attempted to specify the spot, the problems surrounding the originally misplaced marker were brought up before the US Supreme Court. In order to amicably remedy this original surveying error, the US Supreme Court then redefined the point of the Four Corners, officially moving the Four Corners point roughly 1,800 feet (550 m) east, to where the original survey had first held it to be all along, and where it remains to this day, duly marked. This initial survey error has resulted in some longstanding misunderstandings about the correct location of the Four Corners marker, some of which remain to this day.

The first Navajo tribal government was established in 1923 to regulate an increasing number of oil exploration activities on Navajo land in the Four Corners area.

== Geography ==
The Four Corners Monument is located at 36°59′56.3″N 109°02′42.6″W.

The Four Corners is part of the high Colorado Plateau. This makes it a center for weather systems, which stabilize on the plateau then proceed eastward through Colorado and into the central states. This weather system creates snow- and rainfall over the central United States.

Federally protected areas in the Four Corners area include Canyon de Chelly National Monument, Hovenweep National Monument, Mesa Verde National Park, and Canyons of the Ancients National Monument. Mountain Ranges in the Four Corners include Sleeping Ute Mountains, Abajo Mountains, and the Chuska Mountains.

== Politics ==
Six governments have jurisdictional boundaries at the Four Corners Monument: the states of Arizona, Colorado, New Mexico, and Utah, as well as the tribal governments of the Navajo Nation and Ute Mountain Ute Tribe. The Four Corners Monument itself is administered by the Navajo Nation Department of Parks and Recreation. Other tribal nations within the Four Corners region include the Hopi and other Ute. The Four Corners is home to the capital of the Navajo tribal government at Window Rock, Arizona. The Ute Mountain Ute tribal headquarters are located at Towaoc, Colorado. The US federal government also has a large presence in the area, particularly the Department of the Interior with the Bureau of Indian Affairs and the Department of Agriculture with the Forest Service.

== Cities ==
The Four Corners region is mostly rural. The economic hub, largest city, and only metropolitan area in the region is Farmington, New Mexico. The populated settlement closest to the center of Four Corners is Teec Nos Pos, Arizona. Other cities in the region include Cortez and Durango in Colorado; Monticello and Blanding in Utah; Kayenta and Chinle in Arizona; and Shiprock, Aztec, and Bloomfield in New Mexico.

== Counties ==
- San Juan County, New Mexico
- Montezuma County, Colorado
- San Juan County, Utah
- Apache County, Arizona

== Transportation ==
Air service is available via the Durango-La Plata County Airport in Durango, Colorado, Four Corners Regional Airport in Farmington, New Mexico, and Cortez Municipal Airport in Cortez, Colorado. Interstate 40 passes along the southern edge of the Four Corners region. The primary U.S. Highways that directly serve the Four Corners include U.S. Route 64, U.S. Route 160 (which serves the Four Corners Monument itself), U.S. Route 163, U.S. Route 191, U.S. Route 491 (previously U.S. Route 666), and U.S. Route 550.

The main line of the Atchison, Topeka and Santa Fe Railway, now operated by the BNSF Railway, passes along the southern edge of Four Corners. The area is home to remnants of through railroads that are now heritage railways. These include the Durango and Silverton Narrow Gauge Railroad and the Cumbres and Toltec Scenic Railroad. The Black Mesa and Lake Powell Railroad, which connects a power plant with a coal mine near Kayenta, comes near the Four Corners.

== Helium ==
The Four Corners region was one of the first locations in the United States in which helium was extracted, and the area is increasingly important as a source of helium supply, with the region being noted for its abundance of high-grade 'green' helium.

The most notable helium field in the region is Arizona's Holbrook Basin.

== Gallery ==
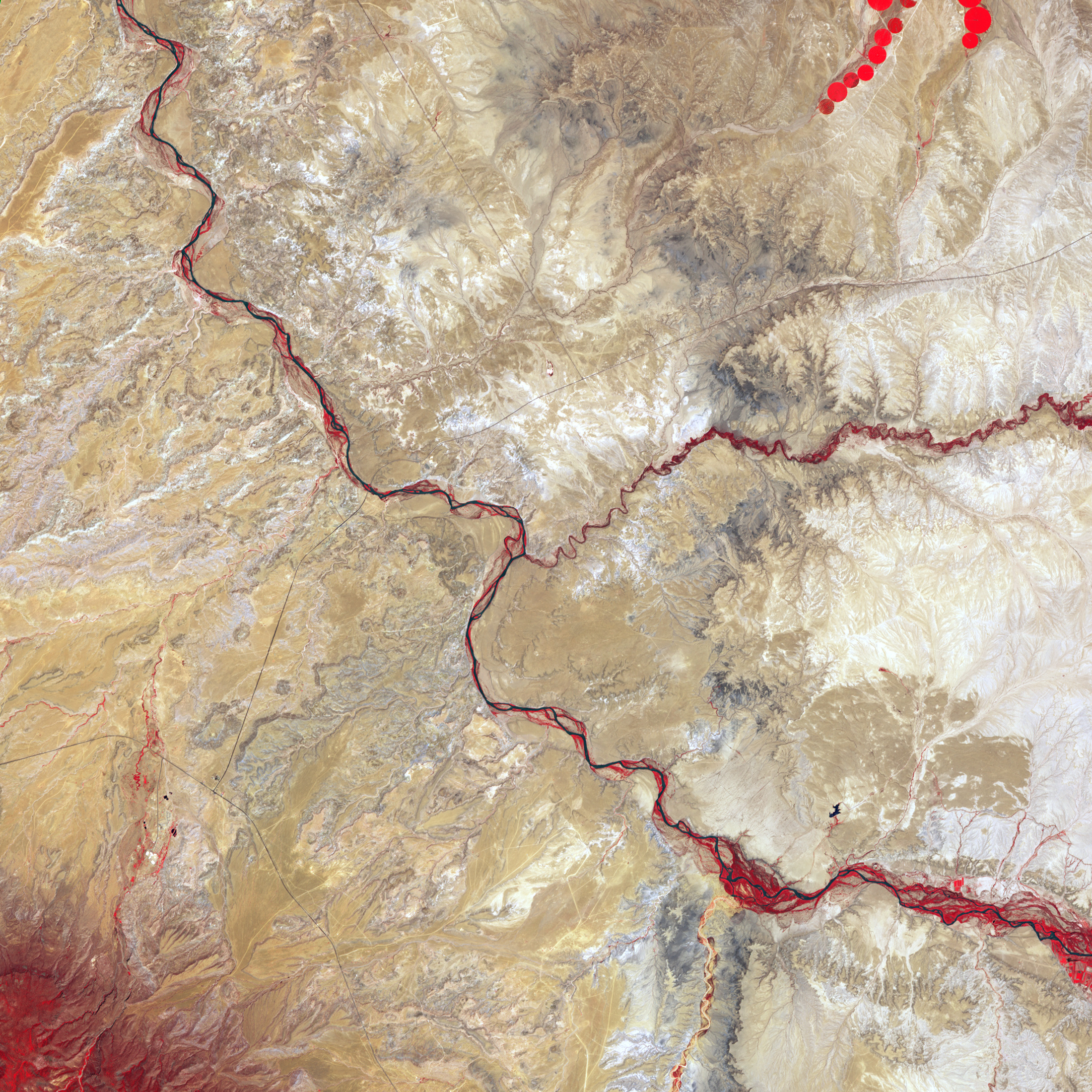
False-color satellite image of the Four Corners. Bright red lines are vegetation along the major rivers of the area. The main southeast–northwest river is the San Juan. The prominent confluence near the center is the confluence with the Mancos River, in New Mexico. The minor confluence northwest of there is with the Toh Dahstini Wash, which drains to the north from Arizona, joining the San Juan in Colorado near the Utah–Colorado border, just north of Four Corners.

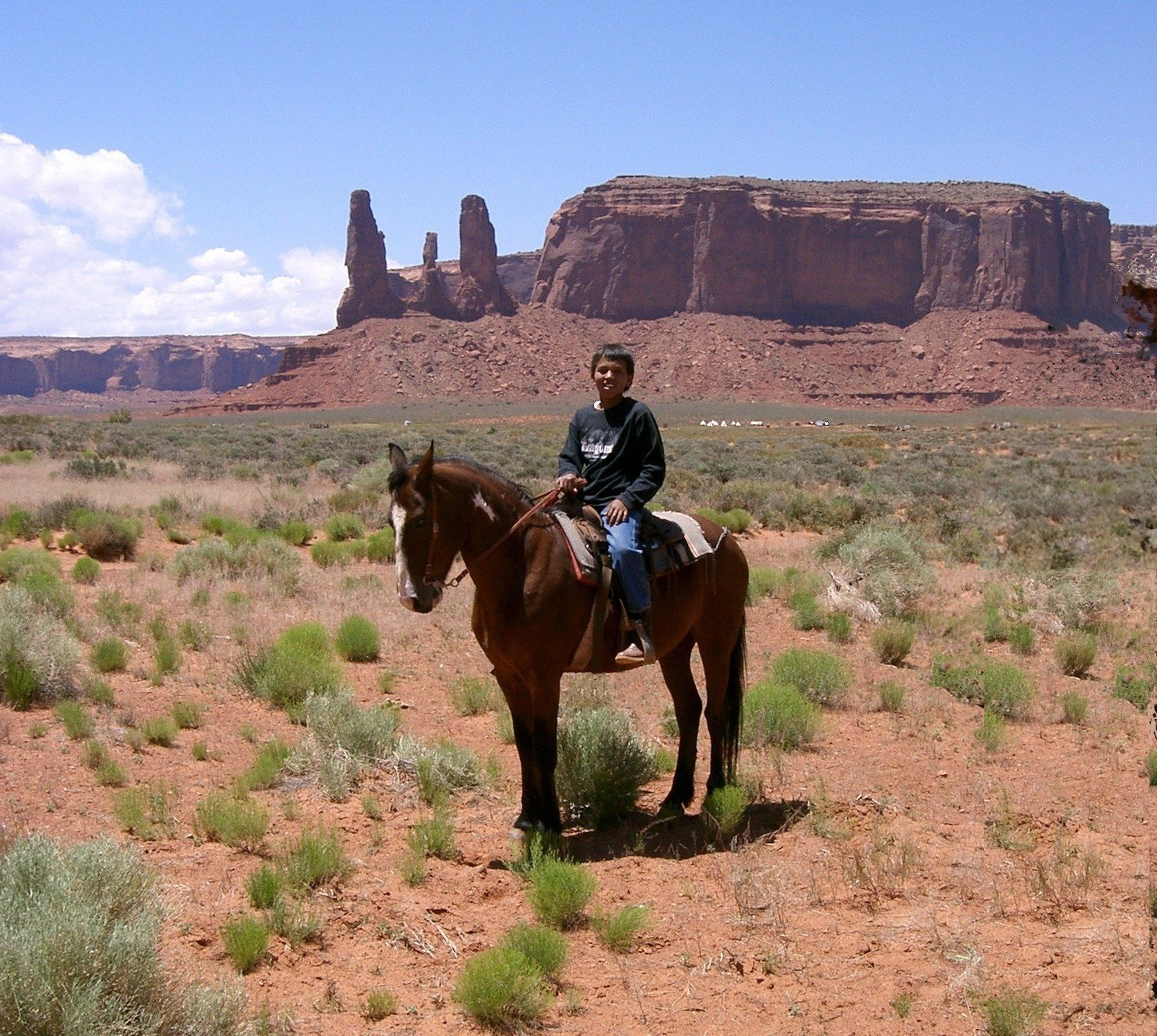
A young Navajo boy on horseback in Monument Valley. The Navajo Nation includes much of the Four Corners area, including the valley, used in many western movies.

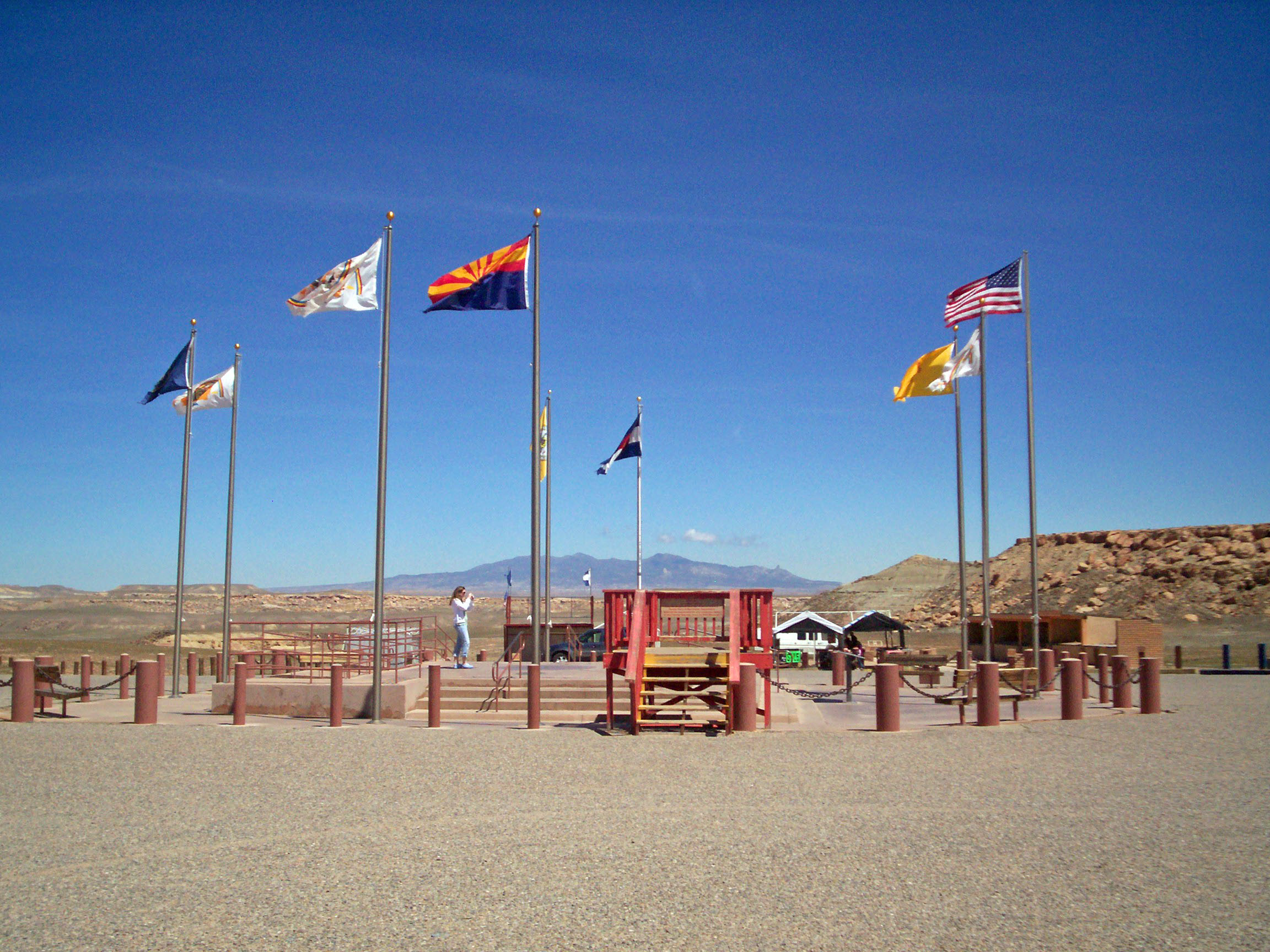
Flags surrounding the Four Corners Monument. In clockwise order starting from the frontmost flag, the state flag of Arizona, flag of the Navajo Nation, pre-2011 flag of Utah, Navajo nation (second instance) Ute Mountain Ute Tribe Reservation, Colorado, New Mexico, Navajo Nation (third instance), and the flag of the United States.

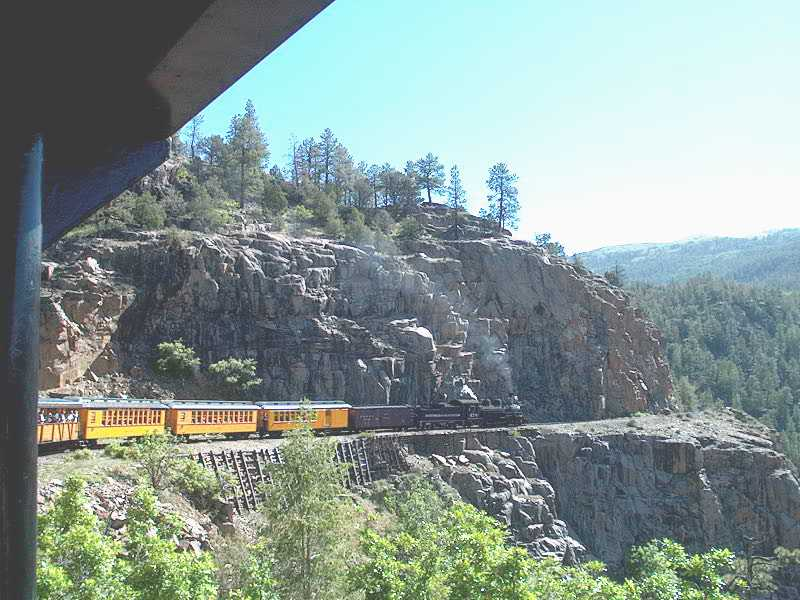
The Durango and Silverton Narrow Gauge Railroad, now a heritage railway, formerly connected the Four Corners area to the national rail network.

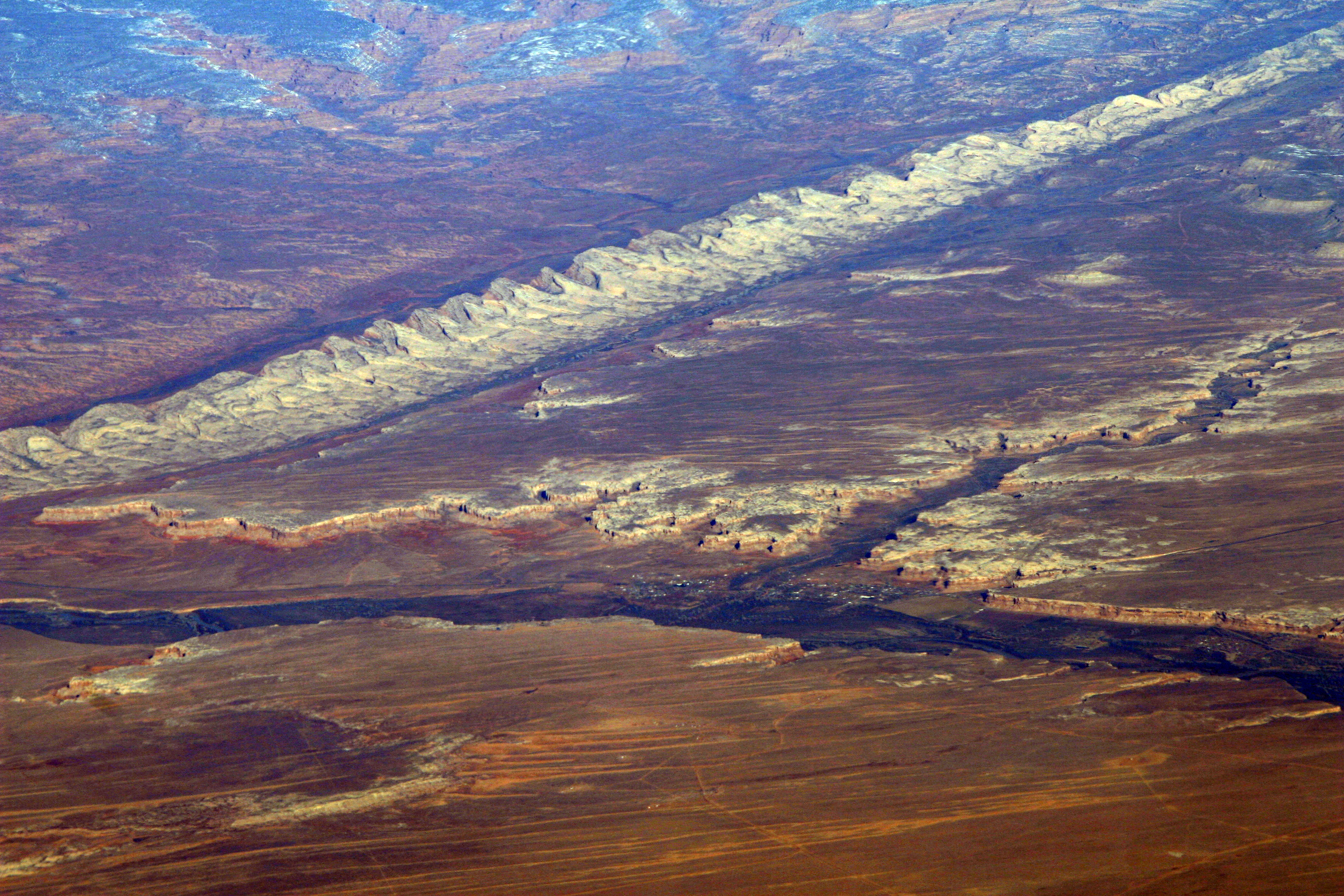
Bluff, Utah and Comb Ridge from the air

== See also ==
- Five Corners, a fictional location in the Simpsons franchise, where five states meet
- Four Corners Monument
- Navajo Nation
  - Navajo Indian Reservation
- Ute Mountain Ute Tribe
  - Ute Mountain Ute Indian Reservation
- List of regions of the United States
- Four Corners radio stations
- Canadian four corners
- Quadripoint
- TAG Corner
- Trail of the Ancients National Scenic Byway, Four Corners, Colorado and Utah
- Trail of the Ancients Scenic Byway (New Mexico)
- List of tripoints of U.S. states
