= List of FM radio stations in the United States by call sign (initial letters WD–WF) =

This is a list of FM radio stations in the United States having call signs beginning with the letters WD through WF. Low-power FM radio stations, those with designations such as WDBA-LP, have not been included in this list.

== WD-- ==
Callsign	Frequency	City of license
WDAA	101.5 FM	Bruce, Mississippi
WDAC	94.5 FM	Lancaster, Pennsylvania
WDAE-FM	95.7 FM	Clearwater, Florida
WDAF-FM	106.5 FM	Liberty, Missouri
WDAI	98.5 FM	Pawleys Island, South Carolina
WDAQ	98.3 FM	Danbury, Connecticut
WDAR-FM	105.5 FM	Darlington, South Carolina
WDAS-FM	105.3 FM	Philadelphia
WDAV	89.9 FM	Davidson, North Carolina
WDBF-FM	106.3 FM	Mount Union, Pennsylvania
WDBG	103.1 FM	Dexter, Georgia
WDBK	91.5 FM	Blackwood, New Jersey
WDBM	88.9 FM	East Lansing, Michigan
WDBN	107.5 FM	Wrightsville, Georgia
WDBQ-FM	107.5 FM	Galena, Illinois
WDBR	103.7 FM	Springfield, Illinois
WDBS	97.1 FM	Sutton, West Virginia
WDBT	103.9 FM	Fort Rucker, Alabama
WDBX	91.1 FM	Carbondale, Illinois
WDBY	105.5 FM	Patterson, New York
WDCB	90.9 FM	Glen Ellyn, Illinois
WDCC	90.5 FM	Sanford, North Carolina
WDCE	90.1 FM	Richmond, Virginia
WDCG	105.1 FM	Durham, North Carolina
WDCH-FM	99.1 FM	Bowie, Maryland
WDCJ	92.7 FM	Prince Frederick, Maryland
WDCK	101.1 FM	Bloomfield, Indiana
WDCL-FM	89.7 FM	Somerset, Kentucky
WDCR	88.9 FM	Oreana, Illinois
WDCV-FM	88.3 FM	Carlisle, Pennsylvania
WDCX-FM	99.5 FM	Buffalo, New York
WDDC	100.1 FM	Portage, Wisconsin
WDDD-FM	107.3 FM	Johnston City, Illinois
WDDE	91.1 FM	Dover, Delaware
WDDH	97.5 FM	St. Marys, Pennsylvania
WDDJ	96.9 FM	Paducah, Kentucky
WDDK	103.9 FM	Greensboro, Georgia
WDDQ	92.1 FM	Adel, Georgia
WDDW	104.7 FM	Sturtevant, Wisconsin
WDEB-FM	103.9 FM	Jamestown, Tennessee
WDEC-FM	94.7 FM	Americus, Georgia
WDEE-FM	97.3 FM	Reed City, Michigan
WDEF-FM	92.3 FM	Chattanooga, Tennessee
WDEL-FM	101.7 FM	Canton, New Jersey
WDEN-FM	99.1 FM	Macon, Georgia
WDEQ-FM	91.7 FM	De Graff, Ohio
WDER-FM	92.1 FM	Peterborough, New Hampshire
WDET-FM	101.9 FM	Detroit, Michigan
WDEV-FM	96.1 FM	Warren, Vermont
WDEZ	101.9 FM	Wausau, Wisconsin
WDFB-FM	88.1 FM	Danville, Kentucky
WDFM	98.1 FM	Defiance, Ohio
WDGC-FM	88.3 FM	Downers Grove, Illinois
WDGG	93.7 FM	Ashland, Kentucky
WDGL	98.1 FM	Baton Rouge, Louisiana
WDHA-FM	105.5 FM	Dover, New Jersey
WDHR	93.1 FM	Pikeville, Kentucky
WDHT	102.9 FM	Urbana, Ohio
WDIC-FM	92.1 FM	Clinchco, Virginia
WDIH	90.3 FM	Salisbury, Maryland
WDIN	102.9 FM	Camuy, Puerto Rico
WDIY	88.1 FM	Allentown, Pennsylvania
WDJC-FM	93.7 FM	Birmingham, Alabama
WDJD	89.9 FM	Aitken, Minnesota
WDJM-FM	91.3 FM	Framingham, Massachusetts
WDJQ	92.5 FM	Alliance, Ohio
WDJR	96.9 FM	Hartford, Alabama
WDJW	89.7 FM	Somers, Connecticut
WDJX	99.7 FM	Louisville, Kentucky
WDKB	94.9 FM	Dekalb, Illinois
WDKC	101.5 FM	Covington, Pennsylvania
WDKE	96.1 FM	Coleraine, Minnesota
WDKF	99.7 FM	Sturgeon Bay, Wisconsin
WDKL	102.7 FM	Mount Clemens, Michigan
WDKM	92.5 FM	Poultney, Vermont
WDKR	107.3 FM	Maroa, Illinois
WDKS	106.1 FM	Newburgh, Indiana
WDKV	91.7 FM	Fond du Lac, Wisconsin
WDKW	95.7 FM	Maryville, Tennessee
WDKX	103.9 FM	Rochester, New York
WDLA-FM	92.1 FM	Walton, New York
WDLD	96.7 FM	Halfway, Maryland
WDLG	90.1 FM	Thomasville, Alabama
WDLJ	97.5 FM	Breese, Illinois
WDLK	90.9 FM	Woodlake, Virginia
WDLL	90.5 FM	Dillon, South Carolina
WDLM-FM	89.3 FM	East Moline, Illinois
WDLT-FM	104.1 FM	Saraland, Alabama
WDLV	88.7 FM	Fort Myers, Florida
WDLZ	98.3 FM	Murfreesboro, North Carolina
WDMG-FM	97.9 FM	Ambrose, Georgia
WDMK	105.9 FM	Detroit, Michigan
WDML	106.9 FM	Woodlawn, Illinois
WDMP-FM	99.3 FM	Dodgeville, Wisconsin
WDMS	100.7 FM	Greenville, Mississippi
WDMT	106.3 FM	Marlinton, West Virginia
WDMX	100.1 FM	Vienna, West Virginia
WDNA	88.9 FM	Miami, Florida
WDNB	102.1 FM	Jeffersonville, New York
WDNE-FM	98.9 FM	Elkins, West Virginia
WDNH-FM	95.3 FM	Honesdale, Pennsylvania
WDNJ	88.1 FM	Hopatcong, New Jersey
WDNL	102.1 FM	Danville, Illinois
WDNS	93.3 FM	Bowling Green, Kentucky
WDNX	89.1 FM	Olive Hill, Tennessee
WDOD-FM	96.5 FM	Chattanooga, Tennessee
WDOG-FM	93.5 FM	Allendale, South Carolina
WDOH	107.1 FM	Delphos, Ohio
WDOK	102.1 FM	Cleveland, Ohio
WDOM	91.3 FM	Providence, Rhode Island
WDOR-FM	93.9 FM	Sturgeon Bay, Wisconsin
WDOT	95.7 FM	Danville, Vermont
WDOZ	91.7 FM	Pierson, Florida
WDPG	89.9 FM	Greenville, Ohio
WDPR	88.1 FM	Dayton, Ohio
WDPS	89.5 FM	Dayton, Ohio
WDPW	91.9 FM	Greenville, Michigan
WDQN-FM	95.9 FM	DuQuoin, Illinois
WDRC-FM	102.9 FM	Hartford, Connecticut
WDRM	102.1 FM	Decatur, Alabama
WDRR	93.9 FM	Martinez, Georgia
WDRT	91.9 FM	Viroqua, Wisconsin
WDRV	97.1 FM	Chicago
WDSD	94.7 FM	Dover, Delaware
WDSE-FM	103.3 FM	Duluth, Minnesota
WDSN	106.5 FM	Reynoldsville, Pennsylvania
WDSO	88.3 FM	Chesterton, Indiana
WDST	100.1 FM	Woodstock, New York
WDSV	91.9 FM	Greenville, Mississippi
WDSY-FM	107.9 FM	Pittsburgh, Pennsylvania
WDTE	88.3 FM	Grosse Pointe Shores, Michigan
WDTL	105.7 FM	Indianola, Mississippi
WDTP	89.5 FM	Huron Township, Michigan
WDTR	88.9 FM	Imlay City, Michigan
WDUC	93.9 FM	Lynchburg, Tennessee
WDUK	99.3 FM	Havana, Illinois
WDUN-FM	102.9 FM	Clarkesville, Georgia
WDUV	105.5 FM	New Port Richey, Florida
WDUX-FM	92.7 FM	Waupaca, Wisconsin
WDUZ-FM	107.5 FM	Brillion, Wisconsin
WDVD	96.3 FM	Detroit, Michigan
WDVE	102.5 FM	Pittsburgh, Pennsylvania
WDVH-FM	101.7 FM	Trenton, Florida
WDVI	100.5 FM	Rochester, New York
WDVR	89.7 FM	Delaware Township, New Jersey
WDVT	94.5 FM	Rutland, Vermont
WDVV	89.7 FM	Wilmington, North Carolina
WDVX	89.9 FM	Clinton, Tennessee
WDWC	90.7 FM	Martins Ferry, Ohio
WDWG	98.5 FM	Rocky Mount, North Carolina
WDWN	89.1 FM	Auburn, New York
WDWS-FM	107.9 FM	Arcola, Illinois
WDWZ	89.3 FM	Andalusia, Alabama
WDXB	102.5 FM	Pelham, Alabama
WDXC	102.3 FM	Pound, Virginia
WDXO	92.9 FM	Hazlehurst, Mississippi
WDXX	100.1 FM	Selma, Alabama
WDXT	93.9 FM	Dansville, New York
WDYF	90.3 FM	Dothan, Alabama
WDYK	100.5 FM	Ridgeley, West Virginia
WDZH	98.7 FM	Detroit, Michigan
WDZN	99.5 FM	Midland, Maryland
WDZQ	95.1 FM	Decatur, Illinois
WDZZ-FM	92.7 FM	Flint, Michigan

== WE-- ==
Callsign	Frequency	City of license
WEAA	88.9 FM	Baltimore, Maryland
WEAG-FM	106.3 FM	Starke, Florida
WEAI	107.1 FM	Lynnville, Illinois
WEAM-FM	100.7 FM	Buena Vista, Georgia
WEAN-FM	99.7 FM	Wakefield–Peacedale, Rhode Island
WEAS-FM	93.1 FM	Springfield, Georgia
WEAT	107.9 FM	West Palm Beach, Florida
WEAX	88.3 FM	Angola, Indiana
WEBB	98.5 FM	Waterville, Maine
WEBE	107.9 FM	Westport, Connecticut
WEBF	88.3 FM	Lerose, Kentucky
WEBG	95.9 FM	Mina, New York
WEBK	91.1 FM	Society Hill, South Carolina
WEBL	95.3 FM	Coldwater, Mississippi
WEBN	102.7 FM	Cincinnati
WEBQ-FM	102.3 FM	Eldorado, Illinois
WEBT	91.5 FM	Langdale, Alabama
WEBZ	99.3 FM	Mexico Beach, Florida
WECB	105.3 FM	Headland, Alabama
WECC-FM	89.3 FM	Folkston, Georgia
WECI	91.5 FM	Richmond, Indiana
WECL	92.9 FM	Lake Hallie, Wisconsin
WECO-FM	101.3 FM	Wartburg, Tennessee
WECQ	92.1 FM	Destin, Florida
WECS	90.1 FM	Willimantic, Connecticut
WECV	89.1 FM	Nashville, Tennessee
WECW	107.7 FM	Elmira, New York
WEDB	98.1 FM	East Dublin, Georgia
WEDG	103.3 FM	Buffalo, New York
WEDJ	107.1 FM	Danville, Indiana
WEDM	91.1 FM	Indianapolis, Indiana
WEDR	99.1 FM	Miami, Florida
WEDW-FM	88.5 FM	Stamford, Connecticut
WEEC	100.7 FM	Springfield, Ohio
WEEI-FM	93.7 FM	Lawrence, Massachusetts
WEEM-FM	91.7 FM	Pendleton, Indiana
WEEO-FM	103.7 FM	McConnellsburg, Pennsylvania
WEER	88.7 FM	Montauk, New York
WEEY	93.5 FM	Swanzey, New Hampshire
WEFI	89.5 FM	Effingham, Illinois
WEFM	95.9 FM	Michigan City, Indiana
WEFR	88.1 FM	Erie, Pennsylvania
WEFT	90.1 FM	Champaign, Illinois
WEFX	100.7 FM	Henderson, New York
WEGB	90.7 FM	Napeague, New York
WEGE	104.9 FM	Lima, Ohio
WEGG	95.3 FM	Bowman, Georgia
WEGH	107.3 FM	Northumberland, Pennsylvania
WEGL	91.1 FM	Auburn, Alabama
WEGM	95.1 FM	San German, Puerto Rico
WEGN	88.7 FM	Kankakee, Illinois
WEGQ	91.7 FM	Quogue, New York
WEGR	102.7 FM	Arlington, Tennessee
WEGS	91.7 FM	Milton, Florida
WEGT	89.9 FM	Greensburg, Indiana
WEGW	107.5 FM	Wheeling, West Virginia
WEGX	92.9 FM	Dillon, South Carolina
WEGZ	105.9 FM	Washburn, Wisconsin
WEHA	88.7 FM	Port Republic, New Jersey
WEHC	90.7 FM	Emory, Virginia
WEHM	92.9 FM	Manorville, New York
WEHN	96.9 FM	East Hampton, New York
WEHP	93.7 FM	Clinton, Indiana
WEIB	106.3 FM	Northampton, Massachusetts
WEII	96.3 FM	Dennis, Massachusetts
WEIO	100.9 FM	Huntingdon, Tennessee
WEIU	88.9 FM	Charleston, Illinois
WEJC	88.3 FM	White Star, Michigan
WEJF	90.3 FM	Palm Bay, Florida
WEJT	105.1 FM	Shelbyville, Illinois
WEJZ	96.1 FM	Jacksonville, Florida
WEKC	88.5 FM	Corbin, Kentucky
WEKH	90.9 FM	Hazard, Kentucky
WEKL	102.3 FM	Augusta, Georgia
WEKP	90.1 FM	Pineville, Kentucky
WEKS	92.5 FM	Zebulon, Georgia
WEKU	88.9 FM	Richmond, Kentucky
WEKV	101.9 FM	Central City, Kentucky
WEKX	102.7 FM	Williamsburg, Kentucky
WELD-FM	101.7 FM	Moorefield, West Virginia
WELH	88.1 FM	Providence, Rhode Island
WELJ	104.7 FM	Montauk, New York
WELK	94.7 FM	Elkins, West Virginia
WELL-FM	88.7 FM	Waverly, Alabama
WELR-FM	102.3 FM	Roanoke, Alabama
WELS-FM	102.9 FM	Kinston, North Carolina
WELX	101.5 FM	Isabela, Puerto Rico
WELY-FM	94.5 FM	Ely, Minnesota
WEMC	91.7 FM	Harrisonburg, Virginia
WEMI	91.9 FM	Appleton, Wisconsin
WEMM-FM	107.9 FM	Huntington, West Virginia
WEMP	98.9 FM	Two Rivers, Wisconsin
WEMU	89.1 FM	Ypsilanti, Michigan
WEMX	94.1 FM	Kentwood, Louisiana
WEMY	91.5 FM	Green Bay, Wisconsin
WEND	106.5 FM	Salisbury, North Carolina
WENI-FM	92.7 FM	South Waverly, Pennsylvania
WENJ	97.3 FM	Millville, New Jersey
WENQ	92.3 FM	Grenada, Mississippi
WENZ	107.9 FM	Cleveland, Ohio
WEOS	89.5 FM	Geneva, New York
WEOW	92.7 FM	Key West, Florida
WEPN-FM	98.7 FM	New York City
WEPR	90.1 FM	Greenville, South Carolina
WEPS	88.9 FM	Elgin, Illinois
WEQF-FM	105.3 FM	Dillwyn, Virginia
WEQL	104.9 FM	La Crosse, Wisconsin
WEQP	91.7 FM	Rustburg, Virginia
WEQS	89.3 FM	Sparta, Wisconsin
WEQX	102.7 FM	Manchester, Vermont
WERB	94.5 FM	Berlin, Connecticut
WERC-FM	105.5 FM	Hoover, Alabama
WERG	90.5 FM	Erie, Pennsylvania
WERI	102.7 FM	Wattsburg, Pennsylvania
WERK	104.9 FM	Muncie, Indiana
WERN	88.7 FM	Madison, Wisconsin
WERO	93.3 FM	Washington, North Carolina
WERQ-FM	92.3 FM	Baltimore, Maryland
WERR	104.1 FM	Vega Alta, Puerto Rico
WERS	88.9 FM	Boston, Massachusetts
WERU-FM	89.9 FM	Blue Hill, Maine
WERV-FM	95.9 FM	Aurora, Illinois
WERW	94.3 FM	Monroe, Michigan
WERX-FM	102.5 FM	Columbia, North Carolina
WERZ	107.1 FM	Exeter, New Hampshire
WESA	90.5 FM	Pittsburgh, Pennsylvania
WESC-FM	92.5 FM	Greenville, South Carolina
WESE	92.5 FM	Baldwyn, Mississippi
WESM	91.3 FM	Princess Anne, Maryland
WESN	88.1 FM	Bloomington, Illinois
WESP	106.3 FM	Jupiter, Florida
WESR-FM	103.3 FM	Onley-Onancock, Virginia
WESS	90.3 FM	East Stroudsburg, Pennsylvania
WESU	88.1 FM	Middletown, Connecticut
WETA	90.9 FM	Washington, D.C.
WETH	94.3 FM	Harrisonburg, Louisiana
WETL	91.7 FM	South Bend, Indiana
WETS-FM	89.5 FM	Johnson City, Tennessee
WEUC	88.7 FM	Morganfield, Kentucky
WEUL	98.1 FM	Kingsford, Michigan
WEUP-FM	103.1 FM	Moulton, Alabama
WEUZ	92.1 FM	Minor Hill, Tennessee
WEVC	107.1 FM	Gorham, New Hampshire
WEVE-FM	97.9 FM	Eveleth, Minnesota
WEVF	90.3 FM	Colebrook, New Hampshire
WEVH	91.3 FM	Hanover, New Hampshire
WEVI	101.3 FM	Frederiksted, Virgin Islands
WEVJ	99.5 FM	Jackson, New Hampshire
WEVL	89.9 FM	Memphis, Tennessee
WEVN	90.7 FM	Keene, New Hampshire
WEVO	89.1 FM	Concord, New Hampshire
WEVQ	91.9 FM	Littleton, New Hampshire
WEVR-FM	106.3 FM	River Falls, Wisconsin
WEVS	88.3 FM	Nashua, New Hampshire
WEVW	90.9 FM	Elysburg, Pennsylvania
WEXP	102.9 FM	Westport, New York
WEXR	106.9 FM	Stonewall, Mississippi
WEXT	97.7 FM	Amsterdam, New York
WEXX	99.3 FM	Elizabethton, Tennessee
WEYE	104.3 FM	Surgoinsville, Tennessee
WEYY	88.7 FM	Tallapoosa, Georgia
WEZB	97.1 FM	New Orleans, Louisiana
WEZC	95.9 FM	Clinton, Illinois
WEZF	92.9 FM	Burlington, Vermont
WEZI	102.9 FM	Jacksonville, Florida
WEZJ-FM	104.3 FM	Williamsburg, Kentucky
WEZL	103.5 FM	Charleston, South Carolina
WEZN-FM	99.9 FM	Bridgeport, Connecticut
WEZQ	92.9 FM	Bangor, Maine
WEZV	105.9 FM	North Myrtle Beach, South Carolina
WEZW	93.1 FM	Wildwood Crest, New Jersey
WEZX	106.9 FM	Scranton, Pennsylvania
WEZY	92.7 FM	Kewaunee, Wisconsin

== WF-- ==
Callsign	Frequency	City of license
WFAE	90.7 FM	Charlotte, North Carolina
WFAJ	96.9 FM	Nassawadox, Virginia
WFAL	105.9 FM	Milner, Georgia
WFAN-FM	101.9 FM	New York City
WFAR	93.3 FM	Danbury, Connecticut
WFAV	95.1 FM	Kankakee, Illinois
WFAZ	90.9 FM	Goodwater, Alabama
WFBA	90.5 FM	Kulpmont, Pennsylvania
WFBC-FM	93.7 FM	Greenville, South Carolina
WFBE	95.1 FM	Flint, Michigan
WFBM	90.5 FM	Beaver Springs, Pennsylvania
WFBQ	94.7 FM	Indianapolis, Indiana
WFBT	106.7 FM	Carolina Beach, North Carolina
WFBV	90.1 FM	Selinsgrove, Pennsylvania
WFBY	93.5 FM	Buckhannon, West Virginia
WFBZ	105.5 FM	Trempealeau, Wisconsin
WFCA	107.9 FM	Ackerman, Mississippi
WFCC-FM	107.5 FM	Chatham, Massachusetts
WFCF	88.5 FM	St. Augustine, Florida
WFCG	107.3 FM	Tylertown, Mississippi
WFCH	88.5 FM	Charleston, South Carolina
WFCJ	93.7 FM	Miamisburg, Ohio
WFCM-FM	91.7 FM	Murfreesboro, Tennessee
WFCO	90.9 FM	Lancaster, Ohio
WFCR	88.5 FM	Amherst, Massachusetts
WFCS	107.7 FM	New Britain, Connecticut
WFCT	105.5 FM	Apalachicola, Florida
WFCV-FM	100.1 FM	Bluffton, Indiana
WFCX	100.5 FM	Apalachicola, Florida
WFDD	88.5 FM	Winston-Salem, North Carolina
WFDL-FM	97.7 FM	Lomira, Wisconsin
WFDM-FM	95.9 FM	Franklin, Indiana
WFDR-FM	94.5 FM	Woodbury, Georgia
WFDT	105.5 FM	Aguada, Puerto Rico
WFDU	89.1 FM	Teaneck, New Jersey
WFDX	92.5 FM	Atlanta, Michigan
WFDZ	93.5 FM	Perry, Florida
WFEN	88.3 FM	Rockford, Illinois
WFEZ	93.1 FM	Miami, Florida
WFFF-FM	96.7 FM	Columbia, Mississippi
WFFG-FM	107.1 FM	Corinth, New York
WFFH	94.1 FM	Smyrna, Tennessee
WFFI	93.7 FM	Kingston Springs, Tennessee
WFFL	91.7 FM	Panama City, Florida
WFFM	105.7 FM	Ashburn, Georgia
WFFN	95.3 FM	Coaling, Alabama
WFFX	103.7 FM	Hattiesburg, Mississippi
WFFY	98.5 FM	San Carlos Park, Florida
WFGA	106.7 FM	Hicksville, Ohio
WFGB	89.7 FM	Kingston, New York
WFGE	101.1 FM	State College, Pennsylvania
WFGF	92.1 FM	Wapakoneta, Ohio
WFGH	90.7 FM	Fort Gay, West Virginia
WFGI-FM	95.5 FM	Johnstown, Pennsylvania
WFGM-FM	93.1 FM	Barrackville, West Virginia
WFGR	98.7 FM	Grand Rapids, Michigan
WFGS	103.7 FM	Murray, Kentucky
WFGW	106.7 FM	Norris, Tennessee
WFGY	98.1 FM	Altoona, Pennsylvania
WFHB	91.3 FM	Bloomington, Indiana
WFHE	90.3 FM	Hickory, North Carolina
WFHG-FM	92.7 FM	Bluff City, Tennessee
WFHL	88.1 FM	New Bedford, Massachusetts
WFHM-FM	95.5 FM	Cleveland, Ohio
WFHN	107.1 FM	Fairhaven, Massachusetts
WFHU	91.5 FM	Henderson, Tennessee
WFHW	90.3 FM	Cambridge, Maryland
WFID	95.7 FM	Río Piedras, Puerto Rico
WFIT	89.5 FM	Melbourne, Florida
WFIU	103.7 FM	Bloomington, Indiana
WFIV-FM	105.3 FM	Loudon, Tennessee
WFIW-FM	104.9 FM	Fairfield, Illinois
WFIX	91.3 FM	Florence, Alabama
WFIZ	95.5 FM	Odessa, New York
WFJA	105.5 FM	Sanford, North Carolina
WFJS-FM	89.3 FM	Freehold, New Jersey
WFKL	93.3 FM	Fairport, New York
WFKS	95.1 FM	Melbourne, Florida
WFKX	95.7 FM	Henderson, Tennessee
WFKY	104.9 FM	Frankfort, Kentucky
WFKZ	103.1 FM	Plantation Key, Florida
WFLA-FM	100.7 FM	Midway, Florida
WFLB	96.5 FM	Laurinburg, North Carolina
WFLC	97.3 FM	Miami, Florida
WFLE-FM	95.1 FM	Flemingsburg, Kentucky
WFLF-FM	94.5 FM	Parker, Florida
WFLJ	89.3 FM	Frostproof, Florida
WFLK	99.3 FM	Seneca Falls, New York
WFLM	91.1 FM	Fort Pierce, Florida
WFLO-FM	95.7 FM	Farmville, Virginia
WFLQ	100.1 FM	French Lick, Indiana
WFLS-FM	93.3 FM	Fredericksburg, Virginia
WFLV	90.7 FM	West Palm Beach, Florida
WFLY	92.3 FM	Troy, New York
WFLZ-FM	93.3 FM	Tampa, Florida
WFMA	102.9 FM	Marion, Alabama
WFMB-FM	104.5 FM	Springfield, Illinois
WFME-FM	92.7 FM	Garden City, New York
WFMF	102.5 FM	Baton Rouge, Louisiana
WFMG	101.3 FM	Richmond, Indiana
WFMH-FM	95.5 FM	Hackleburg, Alabama
WFMI	100.9 FM	Southern Shores, North Carolina
WFMK	99.1 FM	East Lansing, Michigan
WFML	96.7 FM	Vincennes, Indiana
WFMM	97.3 FM	Sumrall, Mississippi
WFMN	97.3 FM	Flora, Mississippi
WFMQ	91.5 FM	Lebanon, Tennessee
WFMR	91.3 FM	Orleans, Massachusetts
WFMS	95.5 FM	Fishers, Indiana
WFMT	98.7 FM	Chicago
WFMU	91.1 FM	East Orange, New Jersey
WFMX	107.9 FM	Skowhegan, Maine
WFMZ	104.9 FM	Hertford, North Carolina
WFNF	92.7 FM	Brazil, Indiana
WFNK	107.5 FM	Lewiston, Maine
WFNM	89.1 FM	Lancaster, Pennsylvania
WFNP	88.7 FM	Rosendale, New York
WFNQ	106.3 FM	Nashua, New Hampshire
WFNZ-FM	92.7 FM	Harrisburg, North Carolina
WFOF	90.3 FM	Covington, Indiana
WFON	101.7 FM	Fond du Lac, Wisconsin
WFOS	88.7 FM	Chesapeake, Virginia
WFOT	89.5 FM	Lexington, Ohio
WFOX	102.3 FM	St. Andrews, South Carolina
WFPB-FM	91.9 FM	Falmouth, Massachusetts
WFPG	96.9 FM	Atlantic City, New Jersey
WFPK	91.9 FM	Louisville, Kentucky
WFPL	89.3 FM	Louisville, Kentucky
WFPS	92.1 FM	Freeport, Illinois
WFPW	91.1 FM	Battens Crossroads, Alabama
WFQS	91.3 FM	Franklin, North Carolina
WFQX	99.3 FM	Front Royal, Virginia
WFRB-FM	105.3 FM	Frostburg, Maryland
WFRD	99.3 FM	Hanover, New Hampshire
WFRE	99.9 FM	Frederick, Maryland
WFRF-FM	105.7 FM	Monticello, Florida
WFRG-FM	104.3 FM	Utica, New York
WFRI	100.1 FM	Winamac, Indiana
WFRK	95.3 FM	Quinby, South Carolina
WFRN-FM	104.7 FM	Elkhart, Indiana
WFRO-FM	99.1 FM	Fremont, Ohio
WFRQ	93.5 FM	Harwich Port, Massachusetts
WFRR	93.7 FM	Walton, Indiana
WFRS	88.9 FM	Smithtown, New York
WFRT-FM	103.7 FM	Frankfort, Kentucky
WFRU	90.1 FM	Quincy, Florida
WFRY-FM	97.5 FM	Watertown, New York
WFSE	88.9 FM	Edinboro, Pennsylvania
WFSH-FM	104.7 FM	Athens, Georgia
WFSK-FM	88.1 FM	Nashville, Tennessee
WFSL	90.7 FM	Thomasville, Georgia
WFSO	88.3 FM	Olivebridge, New York
WFSP-FM	107.7 FM	Kingwood, West Virginia
WFSQ	91.5 FM	Tallahassee, Florida
WFSS	91.9 FM	Fayetteville, North Carolina
WFSU-FM	88.9 FM	Tallahassee, Florida
WFSW	89.1 FM	Panama City, Florida
WFSX-FM	92.5 FM	Estero, Florida
WFSY	98.5 FM	Panama City, Florida
WFTA	101.9 FM	Fulton, Mississippi
WFTF	90.9 FM	Rutland, Vermont
WFTK	96.5 FM	Lebanon, Ohio
WFTM-FM	95.9 FM	Maysville, Kentucky
WFTN-FM	94.1 FM	Franklin, New Hampshire
WFTZ	101.5 FM	Manchester, Tennessee
WFUM	91.1 FM	Flint, Michigan
WFUN-FM	96.3 FM	St. Louis, Missouri
WFUS	103.5 FM	Gulfport, Florida
WFUV	90.7 FM	New York City
WFVL	102.3 FM	Lumberton, North Carolina
WFVS-FM	96.9 FM	Reynolds, Georgia
WFVY	100.1 FM	Lebanon, Pennsylvania
WFWI	92.3 FM	Fort Wayne, Indiana
WFWM	91.9 FM	Frostburg, Maryland
WFWO	106.9 FM	Fort Walton Beach, Florida
WFWR	91.5 FM	Attica, Indiana
WFXA-FM	103.1 FM	Augusta, Georgia
WFXC	107.1 FM	Durham, North Carolina
WFXD	103.3 FM	Marquette, Michigan
WFXE	104.9 FM	Columbus, Georgia
WFXH-FM	106.1 FM	Hilton Head Island, South Carolina
WFXJ-FM	107.5 FM	North Kingsville, Ohio
WFXK	104.3 FM	Bunn, North Carolina
WFXM	107.1 FM	Gordon, Georgia
WFXN-FM	102.3 FM	Galion, Ohio
WFXS	98.7 FM	Pleasant Gap, Pennsylvania
WFXX	107.7 FM	Georgiana, Alabama
WFYI-FM	90.1 FM	Indianapolis, Indiana
WFYR	97.3 FM	Elmwood, Illinois
WFYX	96.3 FM	Walpole, New Hampshire
WFYY	103.1 FM	Windermere, Florida
WFZZ	104.3 FM	Seymour, Wisconsin

== See also ==
- North American call sign
