= WTKE =

WTKE may refer to:

- WTKE (AM), a radio station (1490 AM) licensed to Milton, Florida, United States
- WTKE-FM, a radio station (100.3 FM) licensed to Niceville, Florida
- WFDM (AM), a radio station (1400 AM) licensed to Fort Walton Beach, Florida, which held the call sign WTKE from 2006 to 2008
