= WCNH (Bow, New Hampshire) =

Coordinates: 43.2146°N 71.5738°W

Bow, New Hampshire; United States
- Broadcast area: Concord, New Hampshire
- Frequency: 91.5 MHz
- Branding: Classical New Hampshire

Programming
- Format: Classical music

Ownership
- Owner: New Hampshire Public Radio, Inc.

History
- First air date: 2011
- Last air date: April 14, 2021
- Former call signs: WCNU (2010–2011); WCNH (2011–2021); WSPS (2021–2022)
- Call sign meaning: "Classical New Hampshire"

Technical information
- Facility ID: 172814
- Class: A
- ERP: 190 watts
- HAAT: 144 meters (472 ft)

WCNH was an FM radio station licensed to Bow, New Hampshire, broadcasting on 91.5 MHz. The station served the Concord, New Hampshire area, and was owned by New Hampshire Public Radio, Incorporated. It served as the second home for the "Classical New Hampshire" classical music service, operating from 2011 to 2021.

== History ==
In 2000, Highland Community Broadcasting was created after New Hampshire Public Radio dropped all classical music programming. The group incorporated as a non-profit and applied for a low-power FM license in August 2000. In July 2003, the FCC granted a license to Highland for 94.7 MHz in Concord. After six months of raising funds, WCNH-LP was constructed and went on the air at 2 p.m. on February 29, 2004. In October 2008, Highland was granted a construction permit for a new non-commercial license for 91.5 MHz in Bow, New Hampshire. In October 2011, that new frequency was launched as WCNH, and the low-power FM station was sold.

In June 2014, Highland sold WCNH to New Hampshire Public Radio, Incorporated, for $75,000. The sale was consummated on August 19, 2014.

WCNH operated at only 190 watts due to the crowded state of the noncommercial end of the FM dial in New England; its coverage area was effectively limited to Concord and surrounding areas of Merrimack County. To make up for the shortfall in coverage, it was simulcast on sister station WEVO's second HD channel. When St. Paul's School could no longer operate its station at 90.5 MHz and donated it to NHPR effective March 25, 2021, the network orchestrated a reconstruction of that facility with higher power and moved Classical NH and the WCNH call sign down the dial on April 5, 2021—a change that added 80,000 people to WCNH's coverage area. As a result, 91.5 FM, which went silent to allow NHPR to identify future uses, became WSPS on April 22, 2021. No other use for the frequency was identified, and NHPR submitted the license for cancellation on April 7, 2022.
