= WDLK =

WDLK may refer to:

- WDLK (FM), a radio station (90.9 FM) licensed to serve Woodlake, Virginia, United States; see List of radio stations in Virginia
- WDLK (AM), a defunct radio station (1450 AM) formerly licensed to serve Dadeville, Alabama, United States
