= WKGC =

WKGC may refer to:

- WKGC (AM), a defunct radio station (1480 AM) formerly licensed to serve Southport, Florida, United States
- WKGC-FM, a radio station (90.7 FM) licensed to serve Panama City, Florida
