= WSHF =

WSHF could refer to:

- WSHF (FM), a radio station (92.7 FM) licensed to Haleyville, Alabama, United States
- WNRA-LP, a low-power radio station (94.5 FM) licensed to Hawk Pride, Alabama, which held the call sign WSHF-LP from 2014 to 2022
- WEBZ, a radio station (99.3 FM) licensed to Mexico Beach, Florida, United States, which held the call sign WSHF from 1996 to 1999
- WTKP, a radio station (93.5 FM) formerly licensed to Port St. Joe, Florida, which held the call sign WSHF in 1996
- WZYN, a radio station (810 AM) licensed to Hahira, Georgia, United States, which held the call sign WSHF from 1993 to 1995
- WBTG (AM), a radio station (1290 AM) licensed to Sheffield, Alabama, which held the call sign WSHF from 1963 to 1985
