= WTKP =

Coordinates: 29.819°N 85.259°W

- Port St. Joe, Florida; United States
- Broadcast area: Panama City, Florida
- Frequency: 93.5 MHz

Programming
- Format: Sports

Ownership
- Owner: Omni Broadcasting, LLC

History
- First air date: March 12, 1990 (as WMTO)
- Last air date: c. 2019
- Former call signs: WMTO (1989–1996); WSHF (1996); WEBZ (1996–2007); WPBH (2007–2012)
- Call sign meaning: The Ticket Panama City

Technical information
- Licensing authority: FCC
- Facility ID: 67579
- Class: C2
- ERP: 14,500 watts
- HAAT: 204 meters (669 ft)

Links
- Public license information: Public file; LMS

WTKP (93.5 FM) was a commercial radio station located in Port St. Joe, Florida, broadcasting in the Panama City area on 93.5 FM.

== History ==
Logo as "Rock 93.5"

The station began broadcasting on March 12, 1990 at 93.5 FM, a hybrid hit/talk radio station, branded as "the information station that carries a tune". In 1993, its format flipped to smooth jazz and new-age music under the name "Your Oasis 93.5". Station president Tim O'Brien, through holding company Boss Radio, Inc., moved to acquire WFSY 98.5, WGNE 590, and WEBZ 99.3 from The Woodfin Group in December 1994. WMTO would be relaunched under a Southern rock and country rock format known as "Bubba Radio" on February 23, 1995.

Boss Radio's stations, as well as those owned by Southern Broadcasting Companies (WPAP 92.5 and WPBH 94.5), would be acquired by Paxson Communications in May 1996, forming a five-station cluster in the Panama City market. That December, Paxson would move sister oldies outfit WEBZ's calls and "The Breeze" branding from 99.3 to 93.5 FM, with the newly rechristened WDIZ acting as its AM simulcast. Paxson would later sell its radio holdings to Clear Channel Communications in July 1997.

On November 3, 1999, Clear Channel flipped WEBZ to "93.5 The Beat", the first urban contemporary and R&B station in the area, with WDIZ retaining its oldies format. Sister classic hits station WPBH (99.3 FM) began simulcasting WEBZ on May 3, 2007, and the two would swap call signs eleven days later, moving the stations' existing programming to their original positions on the dial after nearly eleven years. The new WPBH would remain a simulcast of "99.3 The Beat" until September 7, 2007, when it adopted a classic rock format as "Rock 93.5".

On January 25, 2008, it was announced that WPBH was one of several Clear Channel radio stations to be sold, in order to remain under the ownership caps following the sale of Clear Channel to private investors. Until it was sold, WPBH and other stations to be sold were placed into the Aloha Station Trust.

The station was sold to Omni Broadcasting LLC on May 15, 2012, for a price of $135,000.00. The transaction was consummated on July 6, 2012. On July 9, 2012, WPBH changed its format to sports, branded as "The Ticket" and simulcasting WTKE-FM (100.3) from Niceville, with new call sign WTKP.

On November 5, 2015, WTKP went silent. On May 1, 2016, WTKP returned to the air simulcasting WTKE-FM. WTKP went silent in 2019, and any references to the station on their website have since been erased.

On July 26, 2023, the Federal Communications Commission cancelled WTKP's license due to a combination of lengthy periods of silence and operating from unapproved facilities. The cancellation of the station's license also resulted in the dismissal of applications to move to 93.7 FM in Youngstown, Florida, and to sell the WTKP license to Catholic radio operator Divine Word Communications.
