= WKGC-FM =

WKGC Public Media
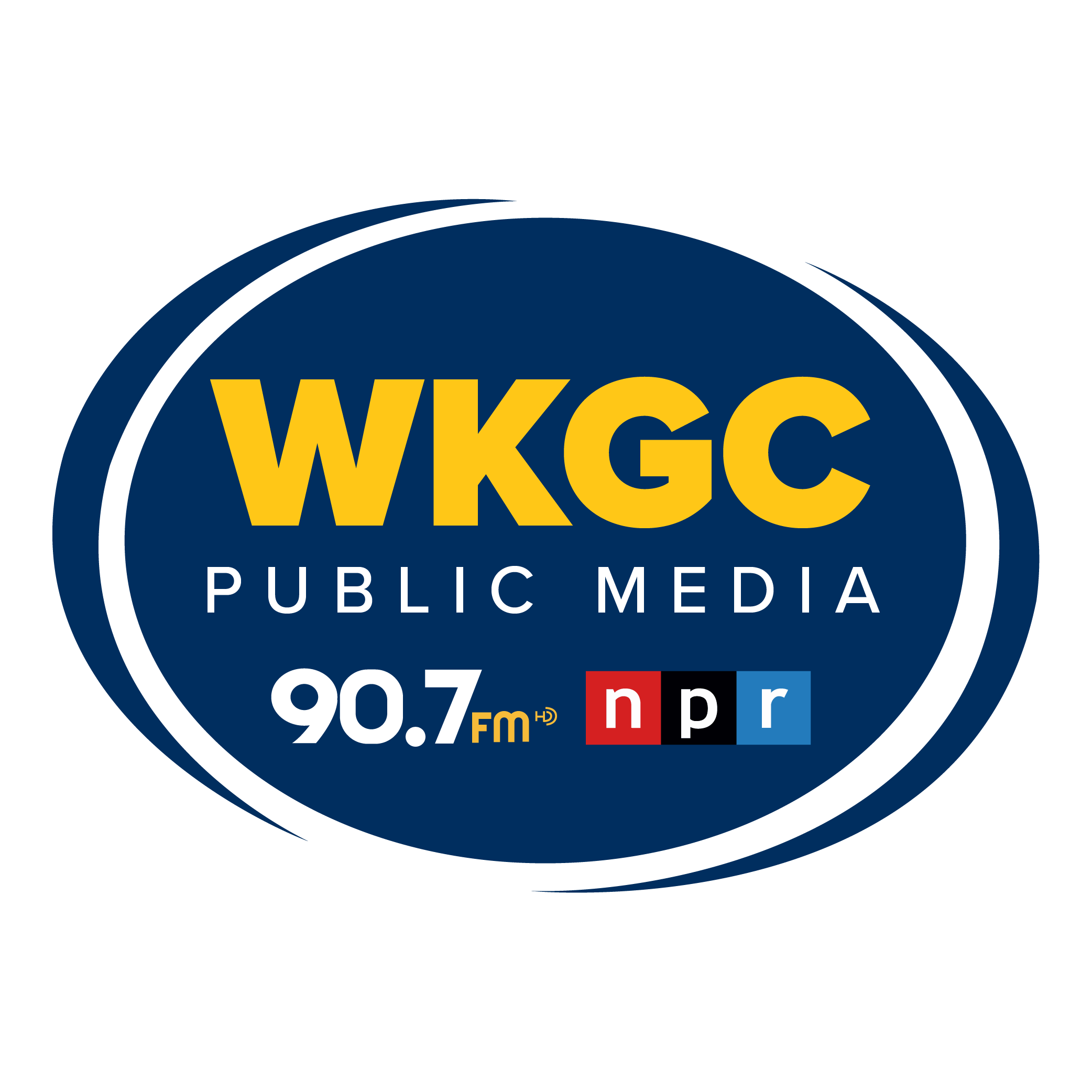
- Panama City, Florida; United States
- Frequency: 90.7 MHz (HD Radio)
- Branding: WKGC Public Media

Programming
- Format: Public radio News/Music/Special Interest/Talk Radio; HD2: Classical music; HD3: Alternative
- Affiliations: American Public Media National Public Radio

Ownership
- Owner: Gulf Coast State College

History
- First air date: October 21, 1974; 51 years ago
- Call sign meaning: WK Gulf Coast

Technical information
- Licensing authority: FCC
- Facility ID: 25562
- Class: C1
- ERP: 100,000 watts
- HAAT: 108.6 meters (356 ft)
- Transmitter coordinates: 30°13′05″N 85°51′16″W

Links
- Public license information: Public Media Public file; LMS
- Webcast: Listen Live (FM/HD1); Listen Live (HD2); Listen Live (HD3)
- Website: wkgc.org

WKGC Public Media (90.7 FM) is a radio station licensed to Panama City, Florida, United States. The station is currently owned by Gulf Coast State College.

WKGC-FM was the brainchild of Gulf Coast students Charles Wooten and Ron Johnson, who began developing the idea in 1968. Initially, the small team had only obtained enough materials for a 100-milliwatt AM signal, which proved to only be strong enough to beam rock music into the student center. On October 21, 1974, WKGC-FM went on the air with a power of ten watts. Over the course of two years, the District Board of Trustees appropriated $20,000 for the station's expansion. The station would only use $13,000 to expand to 9,200 watts, thanks to tower space donated by local radio station WDLP.

In 1976, WKGC-FM became eligible for funding by the state's Department of Education. With this funding, the current crew was able to hire full-time professional staff, which allowed more varied programming and the creation of new educational experiences for students. The state's funding was followed by further funding from the Corporation for Public Broadcasting. Later in 1976, WKGC secured an affiliation with NPR, broadening the station's repertoire with including original programs such as All Things Considered.

In 1978, the station was granted a power increase to 28,500 watts, with its reach reportedly spanning from Pensacola to Apalachicola and above the Alabama state line. In 1979, a satellite dish was installed on-site, to ease the pre-recording of programs. That same year, a grant from the Florida Legislature and associated organizations granted WKGC-FM $350,000 for new facilities, marking the first time the station would operate from a real studio.

In 1982, Janus Broadcasting, then-owner of Panama City's WGNE-FM, donated to the college what had been WGNE's AM counterpart on 1480 kHz. This acquisition led to WKGC becoming the first AM/FM community college radio station in the United States. Over time, programming between the AM and FM stations would diverge. This duopoly would be ended by Hurricane Michael's October 2018 landfall destroying the WKGC (AM) transmitter, as the college would sell the silent station for $5,000 the following year.

WKGC carries programming from National Public Radio, American Public Media, and independently produced special interest programming on a variety of topics. Starting in February 2025, WKGC Public Media began airing locally-produced call-in style special interest shows on topics such as cinema, live performance music, visual and performing arts, culinary arts, and restaurant critiques. Additionally, the radio station began airing a true crime show.

== HD channels ==
WKGC broadcasts three HD Radio channels:

- HD-1 simulcasts the main WKGC-FM signal.
- HD-2 carries Jazz Music
- HD-3 carries GCSC's student-run AlterNation
