= WXMD =

WXMD may refer to:

- WXMD (FM), a radio station (89.7 FM) licensed to serve California, Maryland, United States
- WDCR (FM), a radio station (88.9 FM) licensed to serve Oreana, Illinois, United States, which held the call sign WXMD in 2010
- WNKZ-FM, a radio station (92.5 FM) licensed to serve Pocomoke City, Maryland, which held the call sign WXMD from 2002 to 2009
