= WFLF =

WFLF is the callsign belonging to two radio stations in Florida:

- WFLF (AM), a radio station (540 AM) licensed to Pine Hills, Florida (Greater Orlando)
- WFLF-FM, a radio station (94.5 FM) licensed to Parker, Florida (Panama City metropolitan area)
