= WZFN =

WZFN may refer to:

- WFOX-LP, a low-power radio station (104.3 FM) licensed to serve Sandy Springs, South Carolina, United States, which held the call sign WZFN-LP from 2015 to 2021
- WFDM (AM), a radio station (1400 AM) licensed to serve Fort Walton Beach, Florida, United States, which held the call sign WZFN from 2008 to 2010
- WZFG, a radio station (1100 AM) licensed to serve Dilworth, Minnesota, United States, which held the call sign WZFN from 2006 to 2008
