= We live in a constitutional republic =

American political phrase

"We live in a constitutional republic", "the U.S. is a republic, not a democracy", and variations of these phrases are political slogans associated, since the mid-20th century, with some aspects of conservatism in the United States. Though falsely presented by their proponents as descriptive of the design of the American state since founding, they are entirely absent from revolutionary-era writing and commentary, with their earliest recorded appearance dated to 1836. They were catalyzed as popular refrains in the 1960s by candymaker Robert Welch and, after a period of declining usage, reinvigorated in popular commentary around 2010.

"Scholars" agree the assertions are false or misleading and that they do not represent a conventional understanding of comparative politics, American constitutional law, or United States history and may originate in a misunderstanding of political science terminology. (Note: They have variously been described by legal scholars, political scientists, and journalists as fallacious, dichotomous, disingenuous, confused, inaccurate, erroneous, and hyperbolic.)

== Background ==
A republic is a state in which formal political legitimacy derives from the citizenry, or some portion thereof, instead of a monarch, while democracy is a method of organizing that may be used to various degrees in both republics and monarchies and vests governing power in a broad section of the public or its representatives. Liberalism is a moral philosophy popularized in the 17th century by John Locke that emphasizes individual rights, legal equality and consent of the governed. It was influential in the revolutionary-era United States, particularly among Founding Fathers like Thomas Jefferson and Samuel Adams.

Examples of constraining institutions in liberal democracies
State	Examples	References
France	Constitutional Council; Cour des Comptes; Senate	
Germany	Bundesrechnungshof; Federal Constitutional Court; Federalism	
United States	Federalism; Supreme Court; Senate	

Liberal democracy is a type of democracy posited by Enlightenment thinkers in which the basic principles of democracy are combined with the philosophy of liberalism meaning, in practice, governments respond to majoritarian sentiments — often expressed through elections — but are restrained in some dimensions of their power by rule of law, as well as individual rights to private property and civil liberties. These restraints may be operationalized through "constraining institutions" insulated from majoritarianism, such as judicial review and federalism. In the case of the United States, the U.S. Congress, which — through both statutory and parliamentary rules — combines bicameralism, an inequitably apportioned upper chamber, and supermajoritarianism in the form of the filibuster, has been identified as an example of one such constraining institution, described by political scientist Anthony J. McGann as an intentionally designed "policy-obstructing legislature par excellence".

The United States is a republic organized as a liberal democracy, and has been described among the world's first major liberal democracies. As of the 21st century, other states that are both republics and liberal democracies include France, Germany, and Italy among others.

== History ==
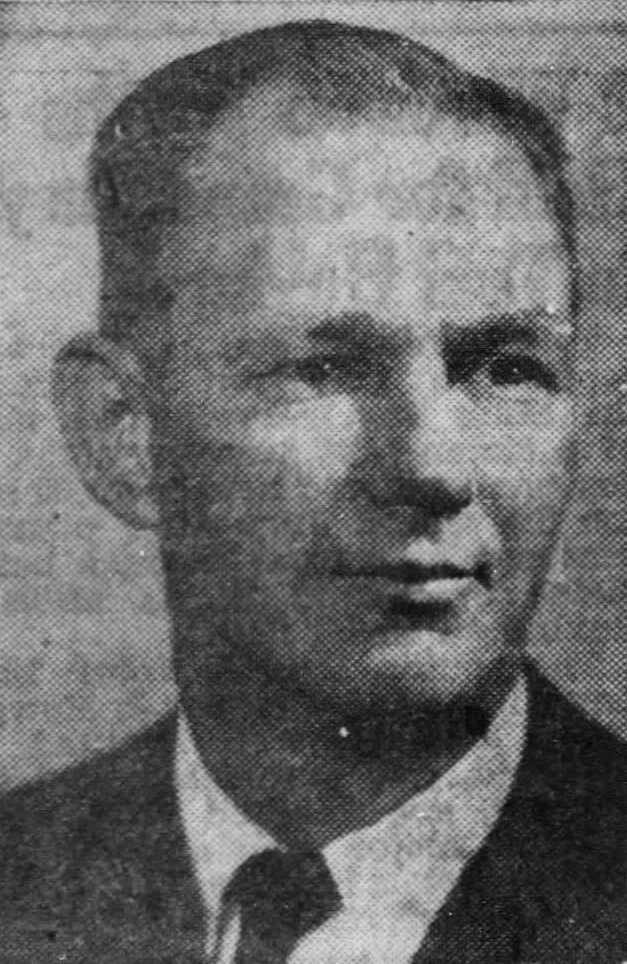
In the 1960s, candymaker Robert Welch (pictured) popularized the slogan "the United States is a republic, not a democracy", described as nonsensical by many political scientists.

In the 20th century, some conservative commentators and politicians in the United States began opining that the United States is a "constitutional republic" and not a democracy.

The phrase "constitutional republic" is a term that was unknown at the founding of the United States and does not appear in the U.S. Constitution, in the Declaration of Independence, in the minutes of the constitutional convention, or in any of the 34 volumes of the Journals of the Continental Congress.

=== Appearance in the 1800s ===
According to Steven L. Taylor, a professor of political science at Troy University, variations of the claims "we live in a constitutional republic" and the U.S. is "a republic ... not a democracy" are largely absent in the American popular press of the 19th, and late 18th, centuries and only first appeared in an editorial published in the September 29, 1836, issue of the Washington National Intelligencer, being invoked sporadically thereafter. Within the decade, in the aftermath of Rhode Island's brief, civil war, the claim staked a stronger foothold, advanced by one of the two factions claiming to be the legitimate government of Rhode Island in a misinterpretation of revolutionary-era writing.

=== Popularization in the 1960s and subsequent decline ===
Invocation of the claims as rhetorical devices continued sporadically until the mid-20th century. For instance, Herman E. Talmadge's 1955 book You and Segregation contains a section header titled "A Republic—Not a Democracy".

Candymaker Robert W. Welch Jr.'s 1961 speech "Republics and Democracies" catalyzed the assertions as political refrains within some sectors of the conservative movement. Welch's declaration was met with skepticism by many, including Ralph O. Zollinger who addressed it in a June 1962 column for the Austin American, responding that Welch's presentation of the United States as "a republic, not a democracy" was burdened by "error and hyperbole" and castigating it as "a play on words that have no historic worth".

Nonetheless, the central premise of Welch's speech was adopted by some in the conservative movement as a slogan presenting itself as a factual assertion, incorporated, for instance, into Barry Goldwater's 1964 presidential campaign material. A 1966 film produced by Dan Smoot staked out the position that referring to the United States as a "democracy" was subversive.

By the later 20th century, the assertions had, according to Timothy Messer-Kruse, a professor of cultural studies at Bowling Green State University, "retreated into the recesses of far-right organizations".

=== Re-popularization after 2010 ===
In 2024, U.S. Secretary of Defense Pete Hegseth (pictured, 2023) posted to social media that the United States was "a Constitutional Republic [sic] NOT a Democracy".

The slogans again made their way into the mainstream around 2010, when they were adopted by some participants in the Tea Party Movement. By 2016, according to Jason Brennan, "so common ... [was] the know-it-all refrain that 'America is a constitutional republic, not a democracy' that the Washington Post" addressed the issue in a column.

In 2020, United States Senator Mike Lee penned a column titled "Of Course We're Not a Democracy" in which he asserted "our system of government is best described as a constitutional republic". On July 4, 2024, United States Secretary of Defense Pete Hegseth posted to X: "Here's a quick reminder of what our founders gave us: a Constitutional Republic, NOT a Democracy".

==== Attempts to incorporate into school curricula ====
In 2010, what NBC News described as a "far-right faction" of the Texas State Board of Education successfully moved to adopt statewide curriculum standards that mandated referring to the U.S. government as a "constitutional republic". Similar legislation was enacted the following year in Utah, which required schools to teach students that the United States is a "compound constitutional republic".

In 2018, Michigan state legislators attempted to remove several references to "democratic values" in that state's social studies standards and add 36 instances of the phrase "constitutional republic".

== Analysis ==
... the United States is both a democracy and a republic. Anybody who insists that we are one, not the other ... is like a child saying the ball isn't green, it's round. Those words are not mutually exclusive.

— Nick Capodice,

Georgetown University political economist Jason Brennan and Yale University political scientist Hélène Landemore write in their 2021 book Debating Democracy, as well as Harvard University professor of public policy Danielle Allen writing separately in Democracies in America: Keywords for the 19th Century and Today, that some political theorists in the late 1700s imprecisely used the word "republic" to refer to what is called in contemporary times a liberal democracy, while the term "democracy" without qualification was used to refer to Greek democracy; they suggest this may have been the genesis of later confusion by some commentators. In common, contemporary usage "democracy" generally refers to "liberal democracy" as opposed to defunct democratic models, such as Greek democracy.

Others, like Taylor and Robert G. Natelson of the Independence Institute, have echoed the suggestion that a misunderstanding by some commentators of the 1900s as to how specific terms were invoked in historical, versus contemporary, usage gave rise to the nonsensical dichotomization of two terms that are not mutually exclusive. Natelson specifically attributes "the purported distinction between 'republic' and 'democracy'" as originating in "a misinterpretation of Madison's views in The Federalist.

According to Eugene Volokh, the argument that "the United States is a republic, not a democracy" is a "false dichotomy" and that there is "no basis for saying that the United States is somehow 'not a democracy, but a republic'". George Thomas, a political scientist at Claremont McKenna College, noted that the assertion the "United States is a republic, not a democracy" is a "mostly disingenuous" claim. Addressing the case of a Utah law that required schools to teach that the United States is a "compound constitutional republic", BYU political science professor Adam Brown observed that such a term had never existed prior to the enactment of the legislation and that the Utah State Legislature "pretty much made this one up".

In 2020, the Heritage Foundation published an article by Bernard Dobski titled "America is a Republic, Not a Democracy", advancing what Aloysius Martinich and Thomas G. Palaima characterize as a "shabby piece of reasoning", namely that "the US is either a republic or a pure democracy". According to Martinich and Palaima, this is a fallacy of false dichotomy.

Explained by Nick Capodice, "the United States is both a democracy and a republic. Anybody who insists that we are one, not the other ... is like a child saying the ball isn't green, it's round. Those words are not mutually exclusive".

== See also ==
- Pseudolaw
- Sovereign citizen
