= WECM =

WECM may refer to:

- The MV SSG EDWARD A. CARTER JR., a US Flagged vessel, was issued call sign WECM from 2016 to present.
- WJKS (FM), a radio station (104.3 FM) licensed to Hartford, Vermont, United States, which held the call sign WECM from 2014 to 2015
- WTKE (AM), a radio station (1490 AM) licensed to Milton, Florida, United States, which used the call sign WECM from 1989 to 2010
- WHDQ, a radio station (106.1 FM) licensed to Claremont, New Hampshire, United States, which used the call sign WECM from 1972 to 1985
