= WPVH =

Plymouth, New Hampshire; United States
- Broadcast area: Lakes Region
- Frequency: 90.7 MHz
- Branding: "The Voice of Hope"

Programming
- Format: Christian radio
- Affiliations: Fundamental Broadcasting Network

Ownership
- Owner: Wentworth Baptist Church

History
- First air date: December 2010; 14 years ago
- Last air date: December 17, 2013; 11 years ago
- Call sign meaning: "Plymouth's Voice of Hope"

Technical information
- Licensing authority: FCC
- Facility ID: 175347
- Class: A
- ERP: 325 watts
- HAAT: 61 meters (200 ft)
- Transmitter coordinates: 43°45′45.6″N 71°38′58.3″W

Links
- Public license information: Public file; LMS

WPVH (90.7 FM) was a radio station airing a Christian format licensed to serve Plymouth, New Hampshire. The station was owned by Wentworth Baptist Church and was an affiliate of the Fundamental Broadcasting Network.

The station's license was surrendered to the Federal Communications Commission on December 17, 2013, at which point it was cancelled.
