= Sally Hirsh-Dickinson =

American academic (born 1971)

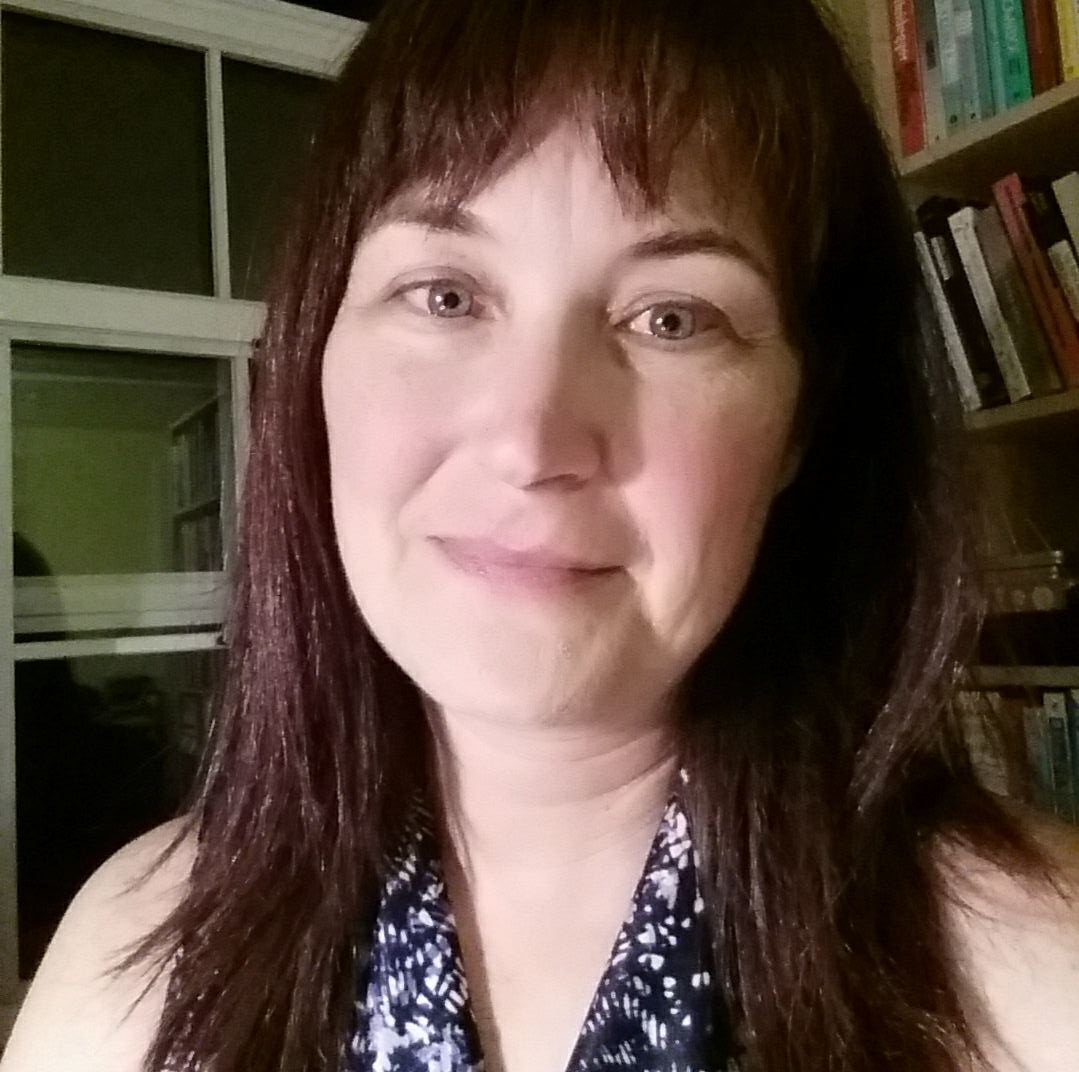
- Born: January 7, 1971 (age 55); Maryland, U.S.
- Occupations: Professor of English at Rivier University; Producer and host at New Hampshire Public Radio

Academic background
- Education: University of New Hampshire
- Thesis: Dirty whites and dark secrets: Sex and race in "Peyton Place" (2007)
- Doctoral advisor: Sarah Sherman

Sally Hirsh-Dickinson (born January 7, 1971) is an American academic who is a producer and host for New Hampshire Public Radio, a New Hampshire politician, and an English professor at Rivier University, where she teaches courses on American literature, gender studies and public speaking. Previously, she was a professor at Colby-Sawyer College. She is an expert on Grace Metalious. Hirsh-Dickinson is the first person to write a full-length study, Dirty Whites and Dark Secrets: Sex and Race in Peyton Place, on Metalious's magnum opus, Peyton Place.

== Early life and education ==
Sally Hirsh-Dickinson was born on January 7, 1971, in Maryland. She graduated from Centennial High School in Howard County, Maryland. Hirsh-Dickinson received her B.A from University of Massachusetts Amherst and her M.A and Ph.D. in English from the University of New Hampshire.

== Academic career ==
During Hirsh-Dickinson's time as a graduate student at the University of New Hampshire she was a teaching assistant. Afterwards, she taught at various schools, including as an adjunct professor at Colby–Sawyer College.

While Hirsh-Dickinson was working on her dissertation about Peyton Place, Dirty Whites and Dark Secrets Sex and Race in Peyton Place, she received criticism because Grace Metalious is not considered to be part of the literary fiction genre. However, despite initial opposition in academia during the research process, her book was later acclaimed in The Chronicle of Higher Education in 2011. Her work on Peyton Place opened eyes in academia about the interlink of sex and racism in the novel and how the portrayal of racism in rural New England is not far from reality.

She has served as a trustee for the New Hampshire Writer's Project.

== Radio career ==
Hirsh-Dickinson joined New Hampshire Public Radio in 1999 as an intern. Starting in 2003 she was a producer and host for The Exchange, New Hampshire Public Radio's call-in radio show that ran until 2021, and is the station's Friday night announcer.

== Personal life ==
Hirsh-Dickinson lives in Penacook, New Hampshire with her family. She serves as Penacook's School Board Representative to the Merrimack Valley School District.

== Publications ==
- Dirty Whites and Dark Secrets: Sex and Race in Peyton Place (University of New Hampshire Press, 2011) ISBN 1-283-30917-3.
- "Becoming a Gardner" (New Hampshire Home magazine, 2019)
