= WCNH =

- Concord, New Hampshire; United States
- Frequency: 90.5 MHz
- Branding: Classical New Hampshire

Programming
- Format: Classical music

Ownership
- Sister stations: WEVO

History
- First air date: June 1974 (as WSPS)
- Former call signs: WSPS (1974–2021)
- Call sign meaning: "Classical New Hampshire"

Technical information
- Licensing authority: FCC
- Facility ID: 62166
- Class: A
- ERP: 530 watts
- HAAT: 100 meters (330 ft)
- Transmitter coordinates: 43°12′53″N 71°34′26″W
- Repeaters: 88.3 WEVS-HD2 (Nashua); 89.1 WEVO-HD2 (Concord); 90.7 WEVN-HD2 (Keene); 91.3 WEVH-HD2 (Hanover); 107.1 WEVC-HD2 (Gorham)

Links
- Public license information: Public file; LMS
- Webcast: Listen live
- Website: www.nhpr.org/programs/classicalnh

WCNH (90.5 FM) is a radio station airing a classical music format licensed to Concord, New Hampshire. The station is owned by New Hampshire Public Radio, Incorporated.

== History ==
This frequency was started by St. Paul's School as WSPS when the Federal Communications Commission granted the school a construction permit for a new 10-watt noncommercial educational radio station on July 5, 1972. The station began broadcasting in June 1974.

On April 5, 2021, after the donation of this facility by the school—which could no longer maintain WSPS—to New Hampshire Public Radio, WSPS became WCNH (and the former WCNH became WSPS), with the Classical New Hampshire service adding 80,000 additional people to its coverage area.
