= Lauren Chooljian =

American radio journalist (born 1987)

- Born: December 29, 1987 (age 38); Hampstead, New Hampshire, U.S.
- Education: Saint Anselm College (BA); Northwestern University (MS)
- Occupation: Journalist
- Years active: 2011–present
- Spouse: Matt Baer (m. 2017)

Lauren Chooljian Baer (born December 29, 1987) is an American radio journalist. She is a senior reporter and producer for New Hampshire Public Radio (NHPR). She previously worked for WBEZ in Chicago.

== Early life and education ==
Chooljian was born and raised in Hampstead, New Hampshire. Her mother, Carrie, is a social worker; her father, Barry, is the former longtime coach of Timberlane Regional High School's decorated wrestling program and is of Armenian descent; and she has a younger sister, Cara. Chooljian worked as a camp counselor in Hampstead for at least seven summers. She represented New Hampshire at Girls Nation, a national youth civic forum in Washington, D.C., in July 2005. She went to high school at Pinkerton Academy, where she served as president of the chorus and co-president of the school council, graduating in 2006.

Chooljian went to college at Saint Anselm in New Hampshire, where she was a member of the field hockey team and graduated with a bachelor's degree in history in 2010. She grew more interested in journalism after she watched a 2008 presidential primary debate at Saint Anselm and got to interview Democratic Party candidate Hillary Clinton. In 2009, she interned for CBS News in New York City. She went to the Medill School of Journalism at Northwestern University, near Chicago, to earn her master's degree in journalism in 2011.

== Career ==
Chooljian began her journalism career after college as an intern for the National Public Radio (NPR) affiliate WBEZ, reporting on local politics in Chicago. She stayed at WBEZ for almost six years, reporting and producing stories in a variety of fields—including politics for most of Rahm Emanuel's mayoral tenure—and occasionally serving as a guest host.

In 2017, Chooljian returned to her home state to work for another NPR affiliate, New Hampshire Public Radio (NHPR). Ahead of New Hampshire's first-in-the-nation presidential primary elections in 2020, she and Jack Rodolico co-hosted Stranglehold, an investigative NHPR podcast about the primary's history and national influence. Members of the New Hampshire media variously praised and criticized Stranglehold for examining the outsize electoral power of "one small state".

In March 2022, NHPR published an investigation by Chooljian that revealed allegations of sexual misconduct against Eric Spofford, the founder of Granite Recovery Centers, a major drug rehabilitation network in New Hampshire. Beginning in late April 2022, Chooljian's home and several homes connected to her were repeatedly vandalized with thrown bricks and red spray paint. In one incident, the words "Just the beginning!" were graffitied onto the side of her house in Melrose, Massachusetts, and her window smashed with a brick. Law enforcement investigating the incidents said they were possibly in retaliation for her reporting on Spofford (who denied involvement in the attacks). In September 2022, Spofford filed a libel lawsuit against Chooljian and NHPR, something the American Civil Liberties Union described as chilling toward free speech; a superior court judge dismissed the suit in April 2023. However, later in the month the judge requested that Chooljian provide the court with anonymized transcripts of her interviews. In June 2023, NHPR published The 13th Step, a podcast about the misconduct allegations and the apparent repercussions of reporting on them.

== Personal life ==
Chooljian met her husband, Matt Baer, in Chicago in August 2013. They got married at the Rocks Estate in New Hampshire on September 2, 2017, shortly before Baer began going to the Tuck School of Business at Dartmouth College.
