= WNEQ =

Radio station in Taylortown, New Jersey

- Taylortown, New Jersey; United States
- Broadcast area: Northern Morris County, New Jersey
- Frequency: 90.3 MHz

Programming
- Format: Christian radio
- Affiliations: SRN News

Ownership
- Owner: Redeemer Broadcasting, Inc.
- Sister stations: WFSO, WXMD

Technical information
- Licensing authority: FCC
- Facility ID: 175731
- Class: A
- ERP: 60 watts
- HAAT: 174 meters (571 ft)
- Transmitter coordinates: 41°01′00″N 74°27′45″W

Links
- Public license information: Public file; LMS
- Webcast: Listen live
- Website: redeemerbroadcasting.org

WNEQ (90.3 FM) is a Christian radio station licensed to Taylortown, New Jersey, serving northern Morris County, New Jersey. The station is owned by Redeemer Broadcasting, Inc.
