= WKGC (AM) =

DWKGC
- Southport, Florida; United States
- Broadcast area: Panama City, Florida
- Frequency: 1480 kHz (HD Radio via WKGC-FM-HD3)

Programming
- Format: Defunct
- Affiliations: American Public Media

Ownership
- Owner: Ron Hale; (Omni Broadcasting LLC)
- Sister stations: WKGC-FM

History
- First air date: 1957
- Former call signs: WTHR (1957–1962); WGNE (1965–1981)

Technical information
- Facility ID: 25564
- Class: D
- Power: 5,000 watts day 34 watts night
- Transmitter coordinates: 30°13′05″N 85°51′16″W

WKGC (1480 AM) was a radio station licensed to Southport, Florida, United States. The station served the Panama City, Florida area. The station was last owned by Ron Hale, through licensee Omni Broadcasting LLC.

== History ==
WKGC began broadcasting in 1957 as WTHR, a popular music and weather station, and operated until 1962, when it went dark. This lasted for three years, until Don McCoy (later founder of Magic Broadcasting) helped launch WGNE (branded as Genie Radio) once again as a popular music station, starting on 25 June 1965. Due to newfound success, in 1971, WGNE-FM went on the air, which proved more successful for the station than the AM signal previously had. Both stations were soon sold to Janus Broadcasting in the 1970s, but still aired the same pop music format. In 1981, Janus Broadcasting donated the radio station to Gulf Coast State College to supplement WKGC-FM, and its callsigns were changed accordingly. This sale led to the WKGC cluster being the first college radio station available in both AM and FM.

Due to the extensive damage of Hurricane Michael, the station had been silent since October 10, 2018.

In March 2019, Omni Broadcasting (based out of Destin, Florida) filed a $5,000 deal to buy the station. At the time, Omni owned WTKP, another station in the Panama City market. The purchase was consummated on September 27, 2019. The station's license was cancelled by the Federal Communications Commission on April 1, 2021, due to WKGC having been silent for more than a year.
