= Nick Capodice =

American podcaster and author

Nick Capodice is a American podcaster and author.

Capodice graduated from Deerfield Academy and attended Emerson College, from which he received a Bachelor of Fine Arts (BFA). He subsequently worked as an educational director at the Lower East Side Tenement Museum. Since 2017 he has been a producer and host at New Hampshire Public Radio (NHPR). There, he is the host of the Civics 101 podcast, which received the 2022 Silver Gavel Award from the American Bar Association for "outstanding work that increases the American public’s understanding of law and the legal system".

With Hannah McCarthy, Capodice is the author of the 2020 book A User’s Guide to Democracy: How America Works.
