= WFBA =

- Kulpmont, Pennsylvania; United States
- Broadcast area: Shamokin/Frackville
- Frequency: 90.5 MHz
- Branding: Wonderful Faith Bible Ministries 90.1 & 90.5 FM

Programming
- Language: English
- Format: Southern Gospel

Ownership
- Owner: Beaver Springs Faith Baptist Church, Inc.
- Sister stations: WFBM, WFBV

History
- First air date: January 2012
- Call sign meaning: Wonderful Faith Bible Ministries

Technical information
- Licensing authority: FCC
- Facility ID: 171604
- Class: A
- ERP: 1,000 watts
- HAAT: 183 meters (600 ft)
- Transmitter coordinates: 40°47′32″N 76°23′6″W

Links
- Public license information: Public file; LMS
- Website: www.wfbmradio.com

WFBA (90.5 FM) is an American non-commercial educational radio station licensed to serve the community of Kulpmont, Pennsylvania and the larger surrounding communities of Shamokin and Frackville. The station's broadcast license is held by Beaver Springs Faith Baptist Church, Inc.

WFBA broadcasts a Southern Gospel music format. It is part of a simulcast with 90.5 WFBM of Beaver Springs and 90.1 WFBV of Selinsgrove.

== History ==
WFBA 90.5 FM first applied to the U.S. Federal Communications Commission (FCC) for a construction permit in 2009 and it was granted in 2010 to the Apostolic Faith Network, Inc. On August 9, 2013 it was transferred to Beaver Springs Faith Baptist Church, Inc. WFBA was officially assigned its call sign on July 13, 2011.
