= WEEC =

Coordinates: 39.962°N 83.868°W

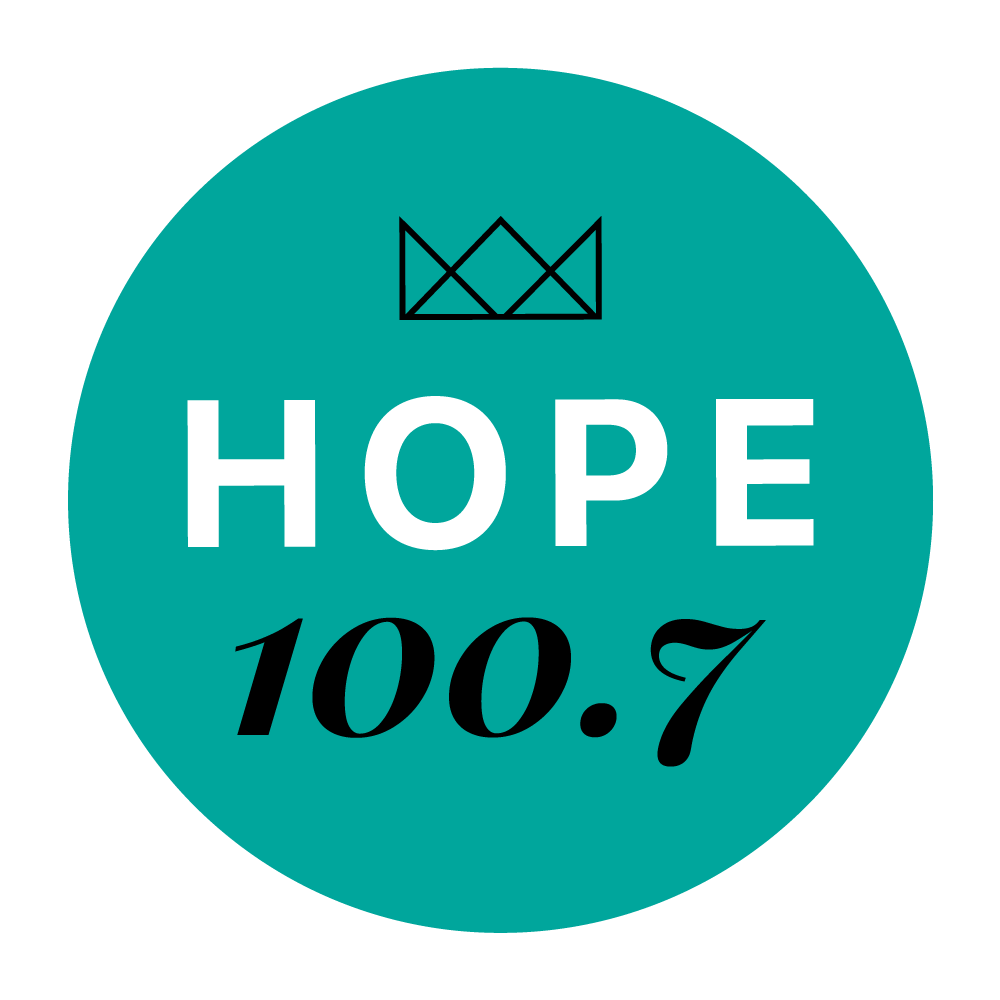

Springfield, Ohio; United States
- Broadcast area: Dayton metropolitan area
- Frequency: 100.7 MHz (HD Radio)
- Branding: Hope 100.7

Programming
- Format: Worship music

Ownership
- Owner: Strong Tower Christian Media; (World Evangelistic Enterprise Corporation)
- Sister stations: WFCJ

History
- First air date: December 15, 1961
- Call sign meaning: World Evangelistic Enterprise Corporation

Technical information
- Licensing authority: FCC
- Facility ID: 73726
- Class: B
- ERP: 50,000 watts
- HAAT: 143 meters (469 ft)

Links
- Public license information: Public file; LMS
- Webcast: Listen Live
- Website: myhope1007.com

WEEC (100.7 FM "Hope 100.7") is a Christian radio station licensed to Springfield, Ohio, and serving the Dayton metropolitan area. It is owned by Strong Tower Christian Media, a non-profit organization. WEEC broadcasts a worship music format. Its studios on Whitefield Circle in Xenia are shared with Miamisburg-licensed sister station 93.7 WFCJ. WEEC seeks donations on the air and on its website.

WEEC has an effective radiated power (ERP) of 50,000 watts, the maximum for most stations in Ohio. The transmitter is off Troy Road (Ohio State Route 41) in Springfield. WEEC broadcasts using HD Radio technology. It has three digital subchannels: HD2 carries The Rock (Southern gospel music). HD3 broadcasts Peace in the Valley (traditional religious music). HD4 airs a Christian talk and teaching format that closely mirrors the programming on its sister station, WFCJ.

== History ==
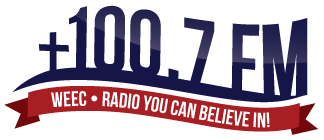
Former logo.

A construction permit for WEEC was granted in March 1961 to Paul Pontus, Dwight Coffelt, and Rev. Glenn Greenwood. The station signed on the air on December 15, 1961. At first, it was a commercial radio station. However, all commercial programming was eliminated just one year later on December 15, 1962.

WEEC began broadcasting in HD Radio in September 2007.

In 2007, WEEC merged with WFCJ under the banner "Strong Tower Christian Media." In 2012, Strong Tower announced that both stations would consolidate their operations into new facilities in Xenia, Ohio.

In July 2019, WEEC dropped its Christian teaching programs, moving them exclusively to WFCJ (which rebranded as 93.7 The Light). After a 10,007-song marathon, WEEC flipped to contemporary worship music as Hope 100.7. Shortly thereafter, WEEC added its fourth HD subchannel which airs most of the teaching programs it had previously carried on the main carrier.
