= WTKE-FM =

- Niceville, Florida; United States
- Broadcast area: Fort Walton Beach area
- Frequency: 100.3 MHz (HD Radio)
- Branding: 100.3 K-Rock

Programming
- Format: Classic rock
- Subchannels: HD2: Simulcast of WTKE (sports); HD3: 94.3 FTW (Conservative talk)

Ownership
- Owner: Jennifer and James Hale; (Omni Broadcasting, LLC)
- Sister stations: WFDM

History
- First air date: 1993 (as WNCV)
- Former call signs: WNCV (1992–2006); WRKN (2006–2009)
- Call sign meaning: "Ticket" (previous branding, now on HD2)

Technical information
- Licensing authority: FCC
- Facility ID: 10055
- Class: A
- ERP: 6,000 watts
- HAAT: 77 meters (253 ft)
- Transmitter coordinates: 30°26′49″N 86°37′5″W
- Translators: HD3: 94.3 W232CF (Fort Walton Beach); HD2: 103.7 W259AN (Fort Walton Beach)

Links
- Public license information: Public file; LMS
- Webcast: Listen live; Listen live (HD3)
- Website: krockfwb.com 943ftw.com (HD3)

WTKE-FM (100.3 MHz) is a radio station broadcasting a classic rock format. Licensed to Niceville, Florida, United States, the station serves the Fort Walton Beach area. WTKE-FM is owned by Jennifer and James Hale, through licensee Omni Broadcasting, LLC.

== History ==
The station was assigned the call sign WNCV on May 7, 1992. On August 1, 2006, the station changed its call sign to WRKN.

On November 19, 2009, WRKN swapped call signs with sister sports station WTKE-FM (which became WHWY). Prior to May 4, 2022, WTKE-FM was a CBS Sports Radio affiliate, broadcasting sports programming as "The Ticket Sports Network" (alongside WTKP prior to 2019). "The Ticket Sports Network" is now on WTKE-FM HD 2 and broadcasts at 103.7 on translator W259AN and 97.1 on translator W246BN in Pensacola, Florida.

== Programming ==
WTKE-FM's programming includes Alice Cooper and his Nights with Alice Cooper show, Carol Miller's Get the Led Out, Sammy Hagar's Top Rock Countdown, Live in Concert, and Dee Snider's House of Hair.

== Subchannels ==
On January 1, 2025, WTKE-HD3 changed their format from conservative talk to classic alternative, branded as "94.3 XYZ".

On July 17, 2025, WTKE-HD3 changed their format from classic alternative to conservative talk, branded as "94.3 FTW".
