= WFCJ =

Christian radio station in Miamisburg, Ohio

- Miamisburg, Ohio; United States
- Broadcast area: Dayton metropolitan area
- Frequency: 93.7 MHz (HD Radio)
- Branding: 93.7 The Light

Programming
- Format: Christian radio
- Subchannels: HD2: Christian rock "Iron FM"

Ownership
- Owner: Strong Tower Christian Media; (Miami Valley Christian Broadcasting Association)
- Sister stations: WEEC

History
- First air date: January 7, 1961
- Call sign meaning: Witnessing for Christ Jesus

Technical information
- Licensing authority: FCC
- Facility ID: 41457
- Class: B
- ERP: 50,000 watts
- HAAT: 150 meters (490 ft)
- Transmitter coordinates: 39°39′35.00″N 84°18′53.00″W

Links
- Public license information: Public file; LMS
- Webcast: Listen live Listen live (HD2)
- Website: 937thelight.com ironfmrocks.com (HD2)

WFCJ (93.7 FM "93.7 The Light") is a radio station licensed to Miamisburg, Ohio, serving the Dayton metropolitan area. Owned by Strong Tower Christian Media, it broadcasts a Christian talk and teaching radio format. The station is funded by both advertising and listener donations. Some of the national religious leaders heard on WFCJ include Charles Stanley, David Jeremiah, Chuck Swindoll, Jim Daly and Rick Warren. Strong Tower Christian Media operates two 50,000 watt Christian radio stations in Ohio. WFCJ and 100.7 WEEC in Springfield serve the cities of Dayton, Middletown, Cincinnati and parts of Northern Kentucky and eastern Indiana.

WFCJ broadcasts in the HD Radio hybrid format. It's HD2 channel carries a Christian rock format branded as IRON FM. NOAA Weather Radio station WXJ46 also transmits from the WFCJ tower. WFCJ's studios and offices are off Home Avenue (U.S. Route 68) in Xenia, Ohio, and the transmitter is off Manning Road in Miamisburg.

== History ==
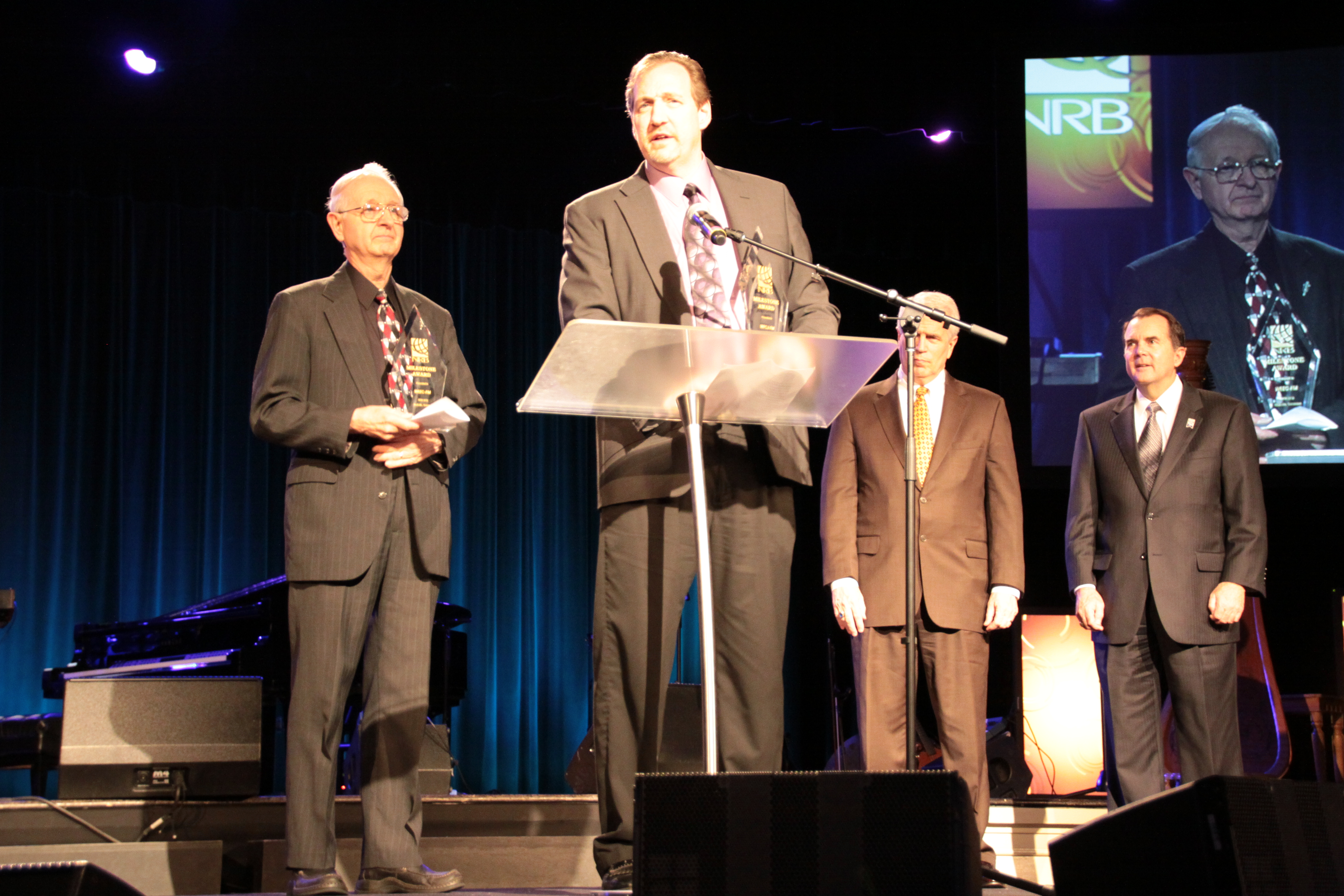
Clair Miller (left) and Tracy Figley (at podium) accepting the Milestone Award at the 2012 National Religious Broadcasters Convention

WFCJ first signed on the air on January 7, 1961. It was owned by the Miami Valley Christian Broadcasting Association and at first was powered at only 6,800 watts.

According to its website, WFCJ was the second Christian radio station to go on the air in Ohio and the first in the Dayton area. The organizers, Wilbur Powell, Vernon Wilson, Ray Emby and others, originally sought an AM license but had to settle for an FM outlet, not realizing that in a few decades, most radio listening would be on the FM dial.

One of the first announcers when the station went on the air on January 7, 1961, was a University of Dayton student named Clair Miller. Miller was also one of the first voices heard on Springfield's Christian station WEEC later that year, returning to WFCJ in May 1980 to serve as the station's General Manager for the next 30 years. In 2007, WFCJ and WEEC agreed to merge under the name Strong Tower Christian Media. WEEC General Manager Tracy Figley served as president of the new corporation and Miller as vice-president. On February 13, 2008, the merger was consummated.

For more than 20 consecutive years, WFCJ was home to the same weekday hosts: Bill Nance (1989–2011) and Melody Morris (1999–2011) 6-9 AM; Jim Williams (1979–2015) 6 AM-3 PM; Stan Ellingson (1986–2014) 3-6 PM, Robin Walton (1988–2018) 6 PM - midnight and Mike Hill from midnight to 6 AM.

In 2012, Strong Tower Christian Media announced that WFCJ and WEEC would consolidate their operations into new facilities in Xenia, Ohio. The stations are housed on the campus of Legacy Christian Academy.

In July 2019, WFCJ switched entirely to spoken-word Christian programming and rebranded as The Light 93.7, leaving music programming exclusive to WEEC (which later re-launched as the worship music station Hope 100.7).
