= WDLK (AM) =

- Dadeville, Alabama; United States
- Frequency: 1450 kHz

Ownership
- Owner: Progressive United Communications, Inc.

History
- First air date: 1980
- Last air date: May 2012

Technical information
- Facility ID: 15281
- Class: C
- Power: 1,000 watts (unlimited)
- Transmitter coordinates: 32°50′56″N 85°46′10″W

WDLK (1450 AM) was a radio station licensed to serve Dadeville, Alabama, United States. The station was owned by Progressive United Communications, Inc.

WDLK broadcast a hot adult contemporary music format.

== History ==
This station received its license to cover from the Federal Communications Commission on October 10, 1980. The new station was assigned the call letters WDLK by the FCC.

In December 1988, Fidelity Broadcasting, Inc. entered into an agreement to sell the station to Dale Broadcasting, Inc. The Federal Communications Commission (FCC) approved the deal on January 12, 1989, and the transaction was completed on February 28, 1989.

In July 1997, Dale Broadcasting, Inc., reached an agreement to sell this station to Little America Business Organization. The deal was approved by the FCC on August 21, 1997, and the transaction was consummated on October 17, 1997.

In June 2000, Little America Business Organization (Dr. James Nicholls, principal) reached an agreement to sell this station to Progressive United Communications Inc. (Frank C. Cummings, chairman) for a reported sale price of $45,000. The deal was approved by the FCC on September 12, 2000, and the transaction was consummated on November 6, 2000. At the time of the sale, WDLK broadcast a news/talk radio format.

On May 9, 2012, the FCC informed the then-silent WDLK that its license would be cancelled if the station remained silent for more than 12 months. The FCC cancelled the station's license on April 30, 2013.
