= WEVC =

New Hampshire Public Radio station in Gorham, New Hampshire

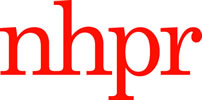
- Gorham, New Hampshire; United States
- Broadcast area: Berlin, New Hampshire
- Frequency: 107.1 MHz (HD Radio)
- Branding: New Hampshire Public Radio (NHPR)

Programming
- Format: Public radio
- Subchannels: HD2: Simulcast of WCNH "Classical NH"
- Affiliations: National Public Radio; American Public Media; Public Radio Exchange

Ownership
- Owner: New Hampshire Public Radio; (New Hampshire Public Radio, Inc.)

History
- First air date: May 1995 (as WXLQ)
- Former call signs: WXLQ (1995–2000)

Technical information
- Licensing authority: FCC
- Facility ID: 24235
- Class: A
- ERP: 6,000 watts
- HAAT: 46 meters (151 ft)
- Transmitter coordinates: 44°27′31″N 71°10′24.9″W

Links
- Public license information: Public file; LMS
- Webcast: Listen live
- Website: nhpr.org

WEVC (107.1 FM) is a radio station licensed to Gorham, New Hampshire. The station is owned by New Hampshire Public Radio, and is an affiliate of their public radio network.

The station signed on in May 1995 as commercial station WXLQ. The station carried country music and classic rock formats during its five years of commercial operation. In 1999, founder Gladys Powell sold the station to NHPR, which made it part of its network on January 10, 2000. It is the only station to be acquired by NHPR (all other NHPR stations were built and signed on by the network).
