= WFBM (FM) =

- Beaver Springs, Pennsylvania; United States
- Broadcast area: McClure/Thompsontown
- Frequency: 90.5 MHz
- Branding: Wonderful Faith Bible Ministries 90.1 & 90.5 FM

Programming
- Language: English
- Format: Southern Gospel

Ownership
- Owner: Beaver Springs Faith Baptist Church, Inc.
- Sister stations: WFBA, WFBV

History
- First air date: January 2012
- Call sign meaning: Wonderful Faith Bible Ministries

Technical information
- Licensing authority: FCC
- Facility ID: 174681
- Class: A
- ERP: 70 watts
- HAAT: 380 meters (1,250 ft)
- Transmitter coordinates: 40°42′40″N 77°09′52″W

Links
- Public license information: Public file; LMS
- Website: www.wfbmradio.com

WFBM (90.5 FM) is an American non-commercial educational radio station licensed to serve the community of Beaver Springs, Pennsylvania. The station's broadcast license is held by Beaver Springs Faith Baptist Church, Inc.

WFBM broadcasts a Southern Gospel music format. WFBM is part of a simulcast with WFBA and WFBV.

== History ==
In October 2007, Beaver Springs Faith Baptist Church applied to the U.S. Federal Communications Commission (FCC) for a construction permit for a new broadcast radio station. The FCC granted this permit on January 15, 2010, with a scheduled expiration date of January 15, 2013. The new station was assigned call sign "WFBM" on January 26, 2010. After construction and testing were completed in January 2012, the station was granted its broadcast license on January 23, 2012.

The full-powered station replaced the church's low-power FM station, WFBM-LP, which broadcast from 2004 to January 2012.
