= WXMD (FM) =

- California, Maryland; United States
- Broadcast area: Southern Maryland
- Frequency: 89.7 MHz

Programming
- Format: Christian radio
- Affiliations: SRN News

Ownership
- Owner: Redeemer Broadcasting, Inc.
- Sister stations: WFSO, WNEQ

Technical information
- Licensing authority: FCC
- Facility ID: 173705
- Class: B1
- ERP: 7,000 watts
- HAAT: 98 meters (322 ft)
- Transmitter coordinates: 38°20′57″N 76°37′34″W

Links
- Public license information: Public file; LMS
- Webcast: Listen live
- Website: redeemerbroadcasting.org

WXMD (89.7 FM) is a Christian radio station licensed to California, Maryland, serving Southern Maryland. The station is owned by Redeemer Broadcasting, Inc.
