= WDIZ (Panama City, Florida) =

Radio station in Panama City, Florida (1940–2020)

- Panama City, Florida; United States
- Broadcast area: Panama City, Florida
- Frequency: 590 kHz

Programming
- Format: Active rock

Ownership
- Owner: iHeartMedia; (Clear Channel Broadcasting Licenses, Inc.)
- Sister stations: WEBZ; WFLF-FM; WFSY; WPAP

History
- First air date: March 21, 1940
- Last air date: May 15, 2020
- Former call signs: WRSR (1939, unused); WDLP (1939–1987); WGNE (1987–1996); WDIZ (1996–2020); WDDV (2020, unused on air)
- Former frequencies: 1200 kHz (1940–1941); 1230 kHz (1941–1947)
- Call sign meaning: no local meaning; originally used on Orlando sister station WRUM

Technical information
- Facility ID: 66666
- Class: B
- Power: 1,700 watts day; 2,500 watts night
- Transmitter coordinates: 30°10′20.7″N 85°36′48.7″W

WDIZ (590 AM) was a radio station broadcasting an active rock format. Licensed to Panama City, Florida, United States, the station was last owned by iHeartMedia. The station went on the air as WDLP in 1940, and operated until May 2020; its license was surrendered, under the WDDV call sign that had never been used on the air, that August.

== History ==
In 1939, three businessmen, William J. Cook, Phil Roll, and Ed DeWitt, founded the Panama City Broadcasting Company. In June 1939, Cook put in an application for the construction of a 250-watt-day, 100-watt-night radio station on West Beach Drive, transmitting on 1200 kHz. After it was approved, the station was assigned the call sign WRSR, which was never used. The station's owner, John H. Perry (owner of WJAX, WCOA, and later the Panama City News-Herald) changed the call letters to WDLP, after his wife Dorothy Lilly Perry. Personnel at the time of launch included Braden L. Ball (general manager), Fred Phillips (program director), Tony Veverka (continuity director), and LeRoy Gibson (advertising manager).

The station's launch and following festivities were widely publicized by the Panama City News-Herald. Charles Francis Coe, an author and boxing announcer, was the master of ceremonies. The station went on the air as WDLP at 7:00 PM local time on March 21, 1940. Shortly after an introduction by Coe, the Bay High School band (playing at the First Methodist Church) kicked off the entertainment with a rendition of Beer Barrel Polka. It is said that within minutes, the station's phone lines were flooded by angry churchgoers about their music choice. Quickly afterward, Coe transferred to Tom Yancey, head of the Panama City Chamber of Commerce. After some brief words, he interviewed some people in the audience. But, when he asked one man, "Sir, in your opinion, what do the letters WDLP stand for?", the man responded with virtually no hesitation: "I think it stands for 'we drink liquor publicly!'". Again, the calls came flooding in. Starting at 10 PM a dance was held at the Armory hosted by Tony Bruno and his 10-piece orchestra that lasted until the early morning hours. Soon, the station's call letters developed another meaning amongst listeners: "Where Days Linger Pleasantly."

WDLP, along with most of the stations on 1200 kHz, moved to 1230 kHz in March 1941, as part of the implementation of the North American Regional Broadcasting Agreement. On October 17, 1947, at 7:15 PM local time, the station moved to 590 kHz, along with use of a new facility building and a power increase to 1,000 watts. For a time, the two new transmitter towers (located in Springfield) were the tallest man-made objects in Panama City, measuring 306 ft (93 m) high, beating out the Dixie-Sherman Hotel on 5th Street by twenty feet (6.1 m).

In the latter half of 1950, WDLP announced plans to launch WDLP-FM as the first FM station in the Panama City area. The FM station went on the air at 8:30 a.m. local time on January 14, 1951, and boasted different programming from its AM counterpart. During daytime hours, if the AM station decided to air coverage of a football game, the FM station would air coverage of a different football game. However, during the night, programs on the AM station were duplicated on the FM band in order to reach areas which the reduced nighttime AM signal had difficulty covering, including Tyndall Field, Port St. Joe, Blountstown, and Fort Walton Beach. WDLP-FM also carried coverage of every convention and City Commission meeting. However, at this time FM receivers were still rare, and the lack of an audience resulted in the FM station ceasing broadcasting in 1958, with its broadcast license deleted by the FCC in 1960.

In the 1960s, WDLP was a top 40 station. In early 1967, WDLP took another chance at operating an FM radio station. A second WDLP-FM went on the air on March 7, 1967, at 92.5 MHz. In May 1968, both WDLP and WDLP-FM fell into the ownership of a "Miracle Radio, Inc.". In March 1969, FM's callsign was changed to WPAP, and has since aired a modern country format.

For a short time in the 1980s, WDLP had a broadcasting studio on Panama City Beach. From 1981 to 1987, under the branding "59DLP" and broadcasting in AM stereo, they played mostly hits from the late forties through mid-sixties, wanting to rekindle the music played on the station's original Top 40 format. Ratings dwindled during 1985–86, and the station's staff were grasping at straws to find a way to restore its success, at any cost. This soon came with the sale of competitor beautiful music station WGNE in 1982 to Gulf Coast Community College and the sale and format change of its FM companion WGNE-FM in 1985 left former listeners clamouring for WGNE to make a return. Upon hearing this, in hopes that it would boost their then-ailing ratings, WDLP gave into the pressure. The last song played on WDLP was "Come Together" by The Beatles. On January 1, 1987, the station's call sign was changed to WGNE, and they began airing a beautiful music format. This only gave them limited success before the station was purchased in the early 1990s.

After this, the station tried a vacation radio format running infomercials for various Bay County tourist attractions. After this, 590 moved to easy listening and later adult standards with "The Breeze" branding. On November 8, 1996, the station changed its call sign to WDIZ; the call sign was previously used by a sister station in Orlando (now WRUM). In 1997, WDIZ, WPBH, WPAP, and WFSY were sold to iHeartMedia (then known as Clear Channel).

WDIZ changed their format to variety hits, branded as "96.3 Real Fun Beach Radio" (simulcast on FM translator W242BF), at noon on June 5, 2015. The first song on "Real Beach Fun Radio" was "Some Beach" by Blake Shelton.

On June 30, 2017, at 5 p.m., after playing "Hello, Goodbye" by The Beatles, WDIZ flipped to active rock as "96 Rock". The first song on "96 Rock" was "For Those About to Rock (We Salute You)" by AC/DC. The "Real Fun Beach Radio" format continues on the IHeartRadio platform.

The AM signal was knocked off the air due to its tower being damaged by Hurricane Michael on October 10, 2018, leaving its FM translator W242BF on 96.3 MHz as the only broadcast outlet for the station. This was soon repaired and the AM signal went back on the air in early January 2019.

Citing "recent market conditions", iHeartMedia shut down the WDIZ transmitter on May 15, 2020. The call sign was changed to WDDV on June 29, 2020, in a move that transferred the WDIZ call letters to 1320 AM in Venice. iHeartMedia surrendered WDDV's license on August 17, 2020, and its license was cancelled August 27, 2020. As a result, 96.3 FM W242BF switched its origin feed to WPAP-HD2.
