= WFBV =

- Selinsgrove, Pennsylvania; United States
- Broadcast area: Selinsgrove/Sunbury
- Frequency: 90.1 MHz
- Branding: Wonderful Faith Bible Ministries 90.1 & 90.5 FM

Programming
- Language: English
- Format: Southern Gospel

Ownership
- Owner: Beaver Springs Faith Baptist Church, Inc.
- Sister stations: WFBA, WFBM

History
- First air date: January 2012
- Call sign meaning: Wonderful Faith Bible Ministries

Technical information
- Licensing authority: FCC
- Facility ID: 175641
- Class: A
- ERP: 1,450 watts
- HAAT: 106 meters (348 ft)
- Transmitter coordinates: 40°50′30″N 76°53′57″W

Links
- Public license information: Public file; LMS
- Website: www.wfbmradio.com

WFBV (90.1 FM) is an American non-commercial educational radio station licensed to serve the community of Selinsgrove, a borough in Snyder County, Pennsylvania. The station's broadcast license is held by Beaver Springs Faith Baptist Church, Inc.

WFBV broadcasts a Southern Gospel music format as a sister station of WFBM (90.5 FM) in Beaver Springs, Pennsylvania and WFBA (90.1 FM) in Kulpmont, Pennsylvania.

== History ==
In October 2007, Beaver Springs Faith Baptist Church applied to the U.S. Federal Communications Commission (FCC) for a construction permit for a new broadcast radio station. The FCC granted this permit on July 6, 2011, with a scheduled expiration date of July 6, 2014. The new station was assigned call sign "WFBV" on July 13, 2011. After construction and testing were completed in January 2012, the station was granted its broadcast license on January 23, 2012.
