= WPAP (FM) =

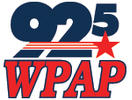
- Panama City, Florida; United States
- Broadcast area: Panama City, Florida
- Frequency: 92.5 MHz (HD Radio)
- Branding: 92.5 WPAP

Programming
- Format: Country
- Subchannels: HD2: News/talk "96.3 & 102.5 WFLA"
- Affiliations: Premiere Networks

Ownership
- Owner: iHeartMedia; (iHM Licenses, LLC)
- Sister stations: WEBZ; WFLF-FM; WFSY

History
- First air date: March 7, 1967 (as WDLP-FM)
- Former call signs: WDLP-FM (1967–1969); WPAP-FM (1969–2014)
- Call sign meaning: "We're Panama City Proud"

Technical information
- Licensing authority: FCC
- Facility ID: 61252
- Class: C1
- ERP: 100,000 watts
- HAAT: 280 meters (920 ft)
- Translators: HD2: 96.3 W242BF (Panama City); HD2: 102.5 W273DU (Panama City)

Links
- Public license information: Public file; LMS
- Webcast: Listen live (via iHeartRadio); HD2: Listen live (via iHeartRadio)
- Website: 925wpap.iheart.com]; HD2: wflapanamacity.iheart.com (HD2)

WPAP (92.5 MHz) is a commercial FM radio station located in Panama City, Florida. WPAP airs a country music format.

== History ==
WPAP began broadcast on March 7, 1967, as WDLP-FM, which was an FM translation of the popular AM station WDLP, with an ERP of 39 kW. On May 24, 1968, an application for assignment of the licences of both the FM and AM station were filed by a "Miracle Radio, Inc.". The station fell into their ownership later that year. In March 1969, the station was renamed WPAP-FM. To celebrate the new radio station, a concert was held at the City Auditorium on 4 April of that year, and featured Wilma Burgess, Archie Campbell, Lorene Mann, and Ray Pillow. Along with the call sign change, WPAP also became the first stereo FM station in the Florida Panhandle, thanks to strengthened equipment. On January 10, 1975, at 6:21 p.m., WPAP switched transmitters, increasing their power to 100,000 watts.

From 1981 until 1984, it was marketed as "North Florida's Country Music Station" under the nickname "WPAP/FM 92". In March 1984, the station experimented with changing its branding to "92 WPAP". This lasted for barely under a year, when in early 1985 it became known as "WPAP 92.5". The current name, "92.5 WPAP", has been used since 1993.

In 1997, WPAP, WPBH, WDIZ, and WFSY were sold to iHeartMedia (then known as Clear Channel).

In August 2020, following the closure of WDIZ, the "96Rock" format used by the defunct station began broadcasting from WPAP-HD2.

== HD channels ==
WPAP broadcasts two HD Radio channels:

- HD1 simulcasts the main WPAP signal.
- HD2 carries "96.3 & 102.5 WFLA", the conservative talk format formerly on WFLF-FM 94.5 Parker.

=== HD2 translators ===
Broadcast translators for WPAP-HD2
Call sign	Frequency	City of license	FID	ERP (W)	Class	Transmitter coordinates	FCC info
W242BF	96.3 FM	Panama City, Florida	140060	250	D	30°11′41.3″N 85°37′50.8″W	LMS
W273DU	102.5 FM	Panama City, Florida	140153	250	D	30°11′1″N 85°46′33.6″W	LMS
