= New Hampshire Public Radio =

Public radio network in New Hampshire

- New Hampshire; United States
- Broadcast area: New Hampshire and bordering areas of Maine, Massachusetts, Vermont and Quebec
- Frequency: See § Stations
- Branding: NHPR

Programming
- Format: News/talk
- Affiliations: NPR; Public Radio Exchange; American Public Media

Ownership
- Owner: New Hampshire Public Radio, Incorporated
- Sister stations: WCNH

History
- First air date: August 4, 1981
- Former names: Granite State Public Radio

Technical information
- Translator: See § Translators

Links
- Webcast: Listen live
- Website: www.nhpr.org

New Hampshire Public Radio (NHPR) is the National Public Radio member network serving the state of New Hampshire. NHPR is based on Pillsbury Street in Concord and operates eight transmitters and six translators covering nearly the whole state, as well as portions of Massachusetts, Vermont and Maine. The network airs NPR news and talk shows on weekdays and a mix of cultural and music programs on weekends.

NHPR's news staff of 21 is one of the largest in the state and is the only statewide source of radio news.

== History and listenership ==
NHPR's original station, WEVO, signed on from Concord on August 4, 1981. It was originally known as "Granite State Public Radio", after New Hampshire's state nickname. Prior to its sign-on, New Hampshire was one of the few states in New England without a clear signal from an NPR station.

WEVO had 500 members at its start. Over several years the station grew in size. In 1991, the newly renamed NHPR began broadcasting 24 hours a day, seven days a week. Between 1992 and 2011, six other stations joined the network. In 1995 NHPR launched The Exchange, hosted by former NPR reporter Laura Knoy.

Until 2000, NHPR broadcast a mix of NPR news and classical music. However, in 2000 it switched its weekday schedule to all news and talk.

In spring 2007 NHPR had a weekly audience of 161,100 listeners and about 16,000 contributing members. It had an annual budget of $4.5 million, with contributions from listeners, local businesses, grants and funding from the Corporation for Public Broadcasting. Contributions from listeners and businesses in New Hampshire make up more than 90 percent of NHPR's revenue. NHPR does not receive funding from the state of New Hampshire.

In 2014, NHPR bought WCNH, a classical music station. Since WCNH operates at only 190 watts, it is simulcast on WEVO's second HD channel.

In 2017, NHPR reported over 190,000 weekly listeners and 200,000 monthly unique website viewers.

== Stations ==
Call sign	Frequency	City of license	Facility ID	ERP (W)	HAAT	Class	Transmitter coordinates	First air date
WEVF	90.3 FM	Colebrook, New Hampshire	173434	270	245 m (804 ft)	A	44°56′49.1″N 71°20′25.2″W	April 26, 2011
WEVO (Note: Flagship station)	89.1 FM	Concord, New Hampshire	48438	50,000	116 m (381 ft)	B	43°12′53.3″N 71°34′26.3″W	August 4, 1981
WEVC	107.1 FM	Gorham, New Hampshire	24235	6,000	−4.1 m (−13 ft)	A	44°27′31″N 71°10′24.9″W	May 1995 (Note: WEVC was commercial station WXLQ from 1995 until it joined NHPR on January 10, 2000.)
WEVH	91.3 FM	Hanover, New Hampshire	48439	600	369 m (1,211 ft)	C3	43°42′32.1″N 72°9′14.6″W	October 1993
WEVJ	99.5 FM	Jackson, New Hampshire	84239	4,700	52 m (171 ft)	A	44°10′30.2″N 71°10′5.2″W	August 14, 2002
WEVN	90.7 FM	Keene, New Hampshire	48440	1,500	286 m (938 ft)	B1	43°2′0.3″N 72°22′2.3″W	April 1994
WEVQ	91.9 FM	Littleton, New Hampshire	173546	580 vertical; 558 horizontal	311 m (1,020 ft)	A	44°21′10.9″N 71°44′14.9″W	October 18, 2011
WEVS	88.3 FM	Nashua, New Hampshire	84847	3,500 vertical; 5,000 horizontal	21 m (69 ft)	A	42°44′58.1″N 71°28′49.5″W	August 9, 2005

=== Translators ===
Call sign	Frequency	City of license	FID	ERP (W)	HAAT	Class	Transmitter coordinates	FCC info	Notes
W289BT	105.7 FM	Colebrook, New Hampshire	140577	95	−48.4 m (−159 ft)	D	44°52′41.6″N 71°28′49.5″W	LMS	Rebroadcasts WEVF
W212AF	90.3 FM	Nashua, New Hampshire	24802	250	29 m (95 ft)	D	42°44′57.2″N 71°28′49.4″W	LMS	Rebroadcasts WEVS

== Programming ==
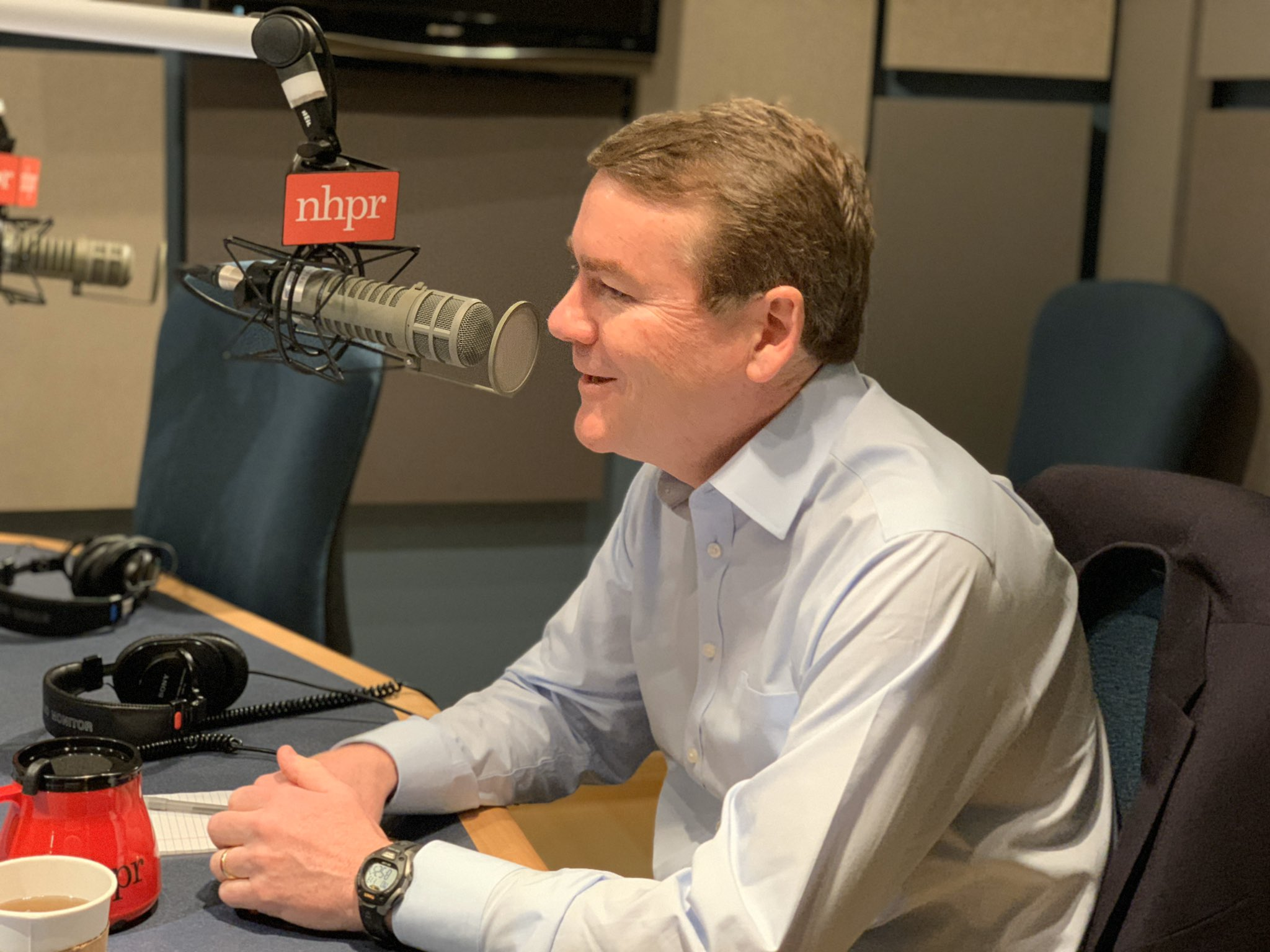
Michael Bennet on-air during The Exchange in 2020

At first, NHPR broadcast a mixed format of news and information programming from NPR during drive times, and music mid-days, evenings, and overnights. As has been the case with most other NPR member stations over the past decade and a half, the network dropped music programming (except for a handful of weekend features) by 2001 to carry news and information programming around the clock.

Local staff produces three hours each day of newscasts and feature reports on local New Hampshire news and two daily interview programs. The Exchange, hosted by Laura Knoy, is a one-hour morning news and public affairs call-in show. Word of Mouth, hosted by Justine Paradis, is a one-hour midday general topics interview show. NHPR also locally produces The Folk Show, a live show featuring performances by local musicians, on Sunday evenings and hosted by Kate McNally.

NHPR broadcasts the major daily news programs produced by NPR, including Morning Edition and All Things Considered. The statewide network also broadcasts programming from American Public Media, including Marketplace, as well as programs from Public Radio Exchange, including This American Life. NHPR also airs programming from international broadcasters, such as As It Happens from Canada's CBC Radio and the BBC World Service from Britain.

== Writers on a New England Stage ==
NHPR, in conjunction with the Portsmouth Music Hall, has produced a series on New England writers and authors. So far the series has had such authors as John Updike (Terrorist), Doris Kearns Goodwin, Dan Brown (The Da Vinci Code), Alan Alda, and Mitch Albom. Virginia Prescott of Word of Mouth is the interviewer, and the trio Dreadnaught is the house band. The River Run Bookstore in Portsmouth is also affiliated.

== Notable employees ==
- Nick Capodice
- Lauren Chooljian, NHPR reporter and producer
- Mark Handley, NHPR's general manager from 1990 to 2005, chairman of NPR's board of directors for two terms
- Sally Hirsh-Dickinson, NHPR producer and host, professor of English at Rivier University
- Eric Westervelt, former NPR foreign correspondent who often reported on the Arab-Israeli conflict, reporter and news director at NHPR for several years
