= WEVO =

New Hampshire Public Radio Flagship Station
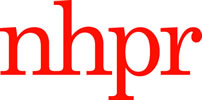
- Concord, New Hampshire; United States
- Broadcast area: Manchester-Nashua-Concord, New Hampshire
- Frequency: 89.1 MHz (HD Radio)
- Branding: New Hampshire Public Radio (NHPR)

Programming
- Format: Public radio
- Subchannels: HD2: Simulcast of WCNH "Classical NH"; HD3: BBC World Service
- Affiliations: National Public Radio; American Public Media; Public Radio Exchange

Ownership
- Owner: New Hampshire Public Radio; (New Hampshire Public Radio, Inc.)
- Sister stations: WCNH

History
- First air date: August 4, 1981

Technical information
- Licensing authority: FCC
- Facility ID: 48438
- Class: B
- ERP: 50,000 watts
- HAAT: 116 meters (381 ft)
- Transmitter coordinates: 43°12′53.3″N 71°34′26.3″W
- Translator: see below

Links
- Public license information: Public file; LMS
- Webcast: Listen live
- Website: nhpr.org

WEVO (89.1 FM) is a radio station licensed to serve Concord, New Hampshire, and serving the Manchester-Nashua-Concord area. The station is owned by New Hampshire Public Radio, and is the flagship affiliate of their public radio network. The station is one of the most powerful in the state, reaching from the White Mountains to Massachusetts Route 128 to southern Vermont.

== Translators ==
Broadcast translators for WEVO
Call sign	Frequency	City of license	FID	ERP (W)	HAAT	Class	Transmitter coordinates	FCC info
W282AB	104.3 FM	Dover, New Hampshire	48441	19	67.2 m (220 ft)	D	43°12′53.3″N 70°52′14.8″W	LMS
W243DE	96.5 FM	Holderness, New Hampshire	140560	250	−39.9 m (−131 ft)	D	43°43′1.7″N 71°32′46.2″W	LMS
W217BH	91.3 FM	Littleton, New Hampshire	121808	10	259.1 m (850 ft)	D	44°21′10.2″N 71°44′12.3″W	LMS
W247AO	97.3 FM	Plymouth, New Hampshire	140565	200	−109.7 m (−360 ft)	D	43°45′24.2″N 71°41′25.2″W	LMS
W280DG	103.9 FM	Portsmouth, New Hampshire	140553	250	0 m (0 ft)	D	43°4′16.9″N 70°45′13.4″W	LMS
