= WFSO =

Radio station in Olivebridge, New York

- Olivebridge, New York; United States
- Broadcast area: Mid Hudson Valley, Eastern Catskills
- Frequency: 88.3 MHz

Programming
- Format: Christian radio
- Affiliations: SRN News

Ownership
- Owner: Redeemer Broadcasting, INC
- Sister stations: WNEQ; WXMD

History
- First air date: December 27, 1996
- Former call signs: WAII (1996)

Technical information
- Licensing authority: FCC
- Facility ID: 11077
- Class: A
- ERP: 578 watts
- HAAT: 33 meters (108 ft)
- Transmitter coordinates: 41°54′30.00″N 74°14′46.00″W
- Translator: See § Translators]

Links
- Public license information: Public file; LMS
- Webcast: Listen live
- Website: redeemerbroadcasting.org

WFSO (88.3 FM) is a Christian radio station licensed to Olivebridge, New York, United States, in north central Ulster County at the foothills of the Catskill Mountains, with a transmitter sited in Olivebridge. WFSO is the full-service NCE flagship of Redeemer Broadcasting, Inc., a not-for-profit Christian radio ministry based in Olivebridge. Redeemer also owns translators W266BX serving Catskill on 101.1 MHz and W212CC serving Newburgh on 90.3 MHz.

== Translators ==
Much of WFSO's audience comes from its translators:

Broadcast translators for WFSO
Call sign	Frequency	City of license	FID	ERP (W)	Class	FCC info
W212CC	90.3 FM	Newburgh, New York	20708	10	D	LMS
W266BX	101.1 FM	Jefferson Heights, New York	11067	10	D	LMS
W287BG	105.3 FM	Rhinebeck, New York	11073	73	D	LMS

== History ==
WFSO first went on the air on December 27, 1996, and was originally owned by Christian Media Associates, Inc, another locally based ministry. The station originally began as an affiliate of Family Radio (and was the last new non-owned station to affiliate with the network).

The 2002 statement by Family Radio president Harold Camping that criticized local churches and urged listeners to abandon churches and their tenants led to a fallout with the owners and supporters of the station, and the larger network. In 2003, WFSO began decreasing the amount of Family Radio content with its own, consistently Christian, programming. The first program that was produced was mostly soft praise and worship music and has developed into what is now known as Reflections. As time went on, more and more programs were added to the broadcast day, some of which restored the better of the Family Radio programs that had been discarded by Family Radio.

In 2004, part of Christian Media Associates would reincorporate as Redeemer Broadcasting, a tax-exempt non-profit organization (501 (c)(3)) that would produce their own programming for WFSO as well as the potential of syndicating programming in the future. This process became complete on December 8, 2005, when WFSO eliminated the last few hours of Family Radio programming from their station. The station works largely on a volunteer basis (with some paid contractors) and has persons on site at all times. Alongside the mix of local and syndicated programming are some unique public affairs shows during weekend hours.

For a short period of time there existed a temporary relationship between the two groups, which helped smooth the assignment of the Newburgh translator license. During which time Christian Media Associates was a wholly owned subsidiary of Redeemer. Finally on November 18, 2009, Redeemer Broadcasting officially separated from Christian Media Associates and since that time the two boards have been completely separate, as documented in the respective corporation records.

The staff at Redeemer Broadcasting is growing the number of locally created programs. A key program heard each week night at 9:00 PM (EST), is Proclamation. Earlier in the evening at 7:00 PM, hosts Dan and Deb Elmendorf present The Covenant Home, a program intended to support Christian homes with excellent book readings and music tailored to the home.

The number of listeners to WFSO has substantially grown since the station converted its programming to 100% Redeemer Broadcasting. In August 2006, WFSO also began streaming audio 24 hours a day on the Internet. This audio stream is accessible from the station's website. A number of former Family Radio listeners in the Hudson Valley have been attracted to the new format because of its support for the church and slight upgrade of music. Financial support is growing steadily and the station is able to stay on the air simply with listener donations and without any underwriters.

Coverage of WFSO's signal was expanded February 2007, when the Rhinebeck translator formerly on 105.7 FM, moved sites and changed frequency to 105.3 FM. Now the signal can be heard in Hyde Park, Pleasant Valley and Poughkeepsie. More coverage was realized in December 2007 when the Newburgh translator at 90.3 FM was placed on the air.

An interesting tidbit regarding the Redeemer Broadcasting infrastructure is that the Redeemer control studio is partially powered by solar power using active solar panels. The panels used are made by Seimens, and the inverters are Trace units. When the sunlight is strong, the power generated by the panels is almost sufficient to run the entire control studio.
