= WTKE (AM) =

Radio station in Milton–Pensacola, Florida

- Milton, Florida; United States
- Broadcast area: Pensacola, Florida
- Frequency: 1490 kHz
- Branding: The Ticket Sports Network

Programming
- Format: Sports
- Affiliations: Fox Sports Radio

History
- First air date: December 18, 1957
- Former call signs: WSRA (1957–1974); WCKC (1974–1989); WECM (1989–2010)
- Call sign meaning: "Ticket"

Technical information
- Licensing authority: FCC
- Facility ID: 20498
- Class: C
- Power: 1,000 watts unlimited
- Transmitter coordinates: 30°37′30.69″N 87°2′53.88″W
- Translator: 97.1 W246BN (Pensacola)
- Repeater: 100.3 WTKE-FM HD2 (Niceville)

Links
- Public license information: Public file; LMS
- Webcast: Listen live
- Website: www.wearesportsradio.com

WTKE (1490 AM) is a radio station licensed to Milton, Florida, United States. The station serves the Pensacola area.
