= WEBZ =

Coordinates: 30.006028°N 85.34325°W

- Mexico Beach, Florida; United States
- Broadcast area: Panama City, Florida
- Frequency: 99.3 MHz
- Branding: 99.3 The Beat

Programming
- Format: Urban contemporary
- Affiliations: Premiere Networks

Ownership
- Owner: iHeartMedia; (iHM Licenses, LLC)
- Sister stations: WFLF-FM, WFSY, WPAP

History
- First air date: November 28, 1990; 35 years ago
- Former call signs: WEBZ-FM (1990–1996); WSHF (1996-1999); WPBH (1999–2007)

Technical information
- Licensing authority: FCC
- Facility ID: 73617
- Class: C2
- ERP: 50,000 watts
- HAAT: 150 meters (490 ft)

Links
- Public license information: Public file; LMS
- Webcast: Listen Live
- Website: 993thebeat.iheart.com

WEBZ (99.3 FM) is a commercial urban contemporary radio station located in Mexico Beach, Florida and serving Panama City, Florida. The station is owned by iHeartMedia.

== History ==
WEBZ was founded as an automated easy listening outfit by Pensacola-area lawyers Robert G. Kerrigan and George W. Estess, and began broadcasting on November 28, 1990. The station boasted the fact that its music library was played from digital compact discs as opposed to the commonly used analog vinyl or tape. The station was sold to Wengor of Panama City, who then sold it to The Woodfin Group in March 1993.

Later in 1993, it became "The Breeze", an oldies station. WMTO president Tim O'Brien, through holding company Boss Radio, Inc., moved to acquire Woodfin's area stations, including WEBZ, WFSY, and WGNE in December 1994. Boss Radio's stations, as well as those owned by Southern Broadcasting Companies (WPAP 92.5 and WPBH 94.5), would be acquired by Paxson Communications in May 1996, forming a five-station cluster in the Panama City market.

That December, Paxson would move WEBZ's calls and "The Breeze" branding to 93.5 FM, with the newly rechristened WDIZ acting as its AM simulcast. The former WEBZ would become WSHF "She 99.3 FM", whose female-oriented alternative rock format originated at Orlando-area sister station WSHE six months earlier. Paxson would sell its radio holdings to Clear Channel Communications in July 1997. In 1999, sister classic hits station WPBH "Beach 94.5" would have its call sign and branding moved to 99.3 FM, as the former became WPPT.

WPBH, then known as "Beach 99.3", began simulcasting sister urban contemporary station WEBZ (93.5 FM) on May 3, 2007, and the two would swap call signs eleven days later, moving the stations' existing programming to their original positions on the dial after nearly eleven years. Since the switch, WEBZ has retained Clear Channel's "The Beat" branding and format, which was originally introduced in 1999 while at 93.5 FM.
