= WFDM (AM) =

- Fort Walton Beach, Florida; United States
- Frequency: 1400 kHz
- Branding: Freedom 94.3

Programming
- Format: Defunct (was Conservative talk)
- Affiliations: Fox News Radio; Genesis Communications Network; Premiere Networks; Radio America; Salem Radio Network

Ownership
- Owner: Omni Broadcasting, LLC
- Sister stations: WTKE-FM

History
- First air date: 1956; 70 years ago (as WNUE)
- Former call signs: WNUE (1956–1994); WFAV (1994–2002); WJGC (2002–2004); WBAU (2004–2006); WTKE (2006–2008); WZFN (2008–2010)
- Call sign meaning: FreeDoM

Technical information
- Licensing authority: FCC
- Facility ID: 47003
- Class: C
- Power: 1,000 watts
- Transmitter coordinates: 30°24′38.00″N 86°37′23.00″W
- Translator: 94.3 W232CF (Fort Walton Beach)
- Repeater: 100.3 WTKE-HD3 (Niceville)

Links
- Public license information: Public file; LMS
- Webcast: Listen Live
- Website: talkfreedom.net

WFDM (1400 kHz, "Freedom 94.3") was an American AM radio station licensed to serve the community of Fort Walton Beach, Florida, United States, on the frequency of 1400 kHz and the translator W232CF. It first began broadcasting in 1956 under the call sign "WNUE". The station licensee and operator is Omni Broadcasting. WFDM had broadcast a conservative talk format as "Freedom 94.3". It had a Spanish format known on air as Radio Latina 94.3 FM before switching back to conservative talk.

On March 20, 2021, WFDM went off the air; their tower and transmitter building had been razed and the studio building (control point) had been vacated.

== History ==
The call letters for WFDM were assigned to Fairleigh Dickenson University Madison, New Jersey Campus carrier's current radio station in the mid-1960s. The call letters are still used by that university for their Madison Campus. In 1975 the station went "airwave" without any license from the FCC thanks to the work of a very industrious student engineer. The station served the Madison, Morristown, Florham Park, and Convent Station areas from 1975 until it was pulled off air in 1976 by the FCC.

The station was first assigned in 1956 with the call sign WNUE, and first started off as a longtime Top-40 format. After more than three decades of running a Top-40 format, WNUE dropped Top-40 in 1992 and launched its sports format. The format only lasted for a couple of years, dropping its format on September 19, 1994, and becoming an easy listening station, with their call letters changed to WFAV. Only lasting for two years, the station began to upgrade its easy listening formula into a mix of news, talk, and oldies in 1997. On January 31, 2002, the station changed its call letters to WJGC and began running an adult standards format, and its call letters changed to WBAU on July 21, 2004, retaining the format.

On June 30, 2006, the station dropped its adult standards format and its call sign was changed to WTKE. The station returned to its previous sports radio format and began to simulcast WTKE-FM as "100.3 The Ticket". The call sign was changed to WZFN in 2008 and the station was branded "1400 Z Fan", retaining the sports talk format. On November 22, 2011, the call sign changed to WFDM. As to confusion, there is a WFDM-FM in Franklin, Indiana, to which there is no owner relation. The station dropped its sports format and returned to its previous news/talk format as "Freedom 94.3", which also simulcasts on W232CF.

WFDM had simulcast on FM translator W232CF as "Radio Latina 94.3 FM" and is owned by Omni Broadcasting, LLC, of Fort Walton Beach. Its lineup once included the Freedom In The Morning Show with Wolfe and Andi, Syndicated hosts Laura Ingrahm, Burnie Thompson, Dave Ramsey, Mark Levin, Brian Kilmead, Alex Jones and was a Fox News Radio, AccuWeather, and a New Orleans Saints (NFL) Radio network affiliate.

Around January 2014, this station flipped to a Spanish format called Radio Latina 94.3 FM. (Taken from their website)

The Federal Communications Commission cancelled the station's license on March 28, 2024.
