= WFLF-FM =

- Parker, Florida; United States
- Broadcast area: Panama City - Florida Panhandle
- Frequency: 94.5 MHz
- Branding: Rock 94.5

Programming
- Format: Active rock
- Affiliations: Premiere Networks

Ownership
- Owner: iHeartMedia, Inc.; (iHM Licenses, LLC)
- Sister stations: WEBZ; WFSY; WPAP

History
- First air date: August 1977 (as WGCV at 93.5)
- Former call signs: WGCV (1977–1983); WJST (1983–1989); WWZR (1989–1993); WKNB (1993–1994); WPBH (1994–1999); WPPT (1999–2002); WFBX (2002–2007)
- Former frequencies: 93.5 MHz (1977–1982)
- Call sign meaning: An extension of WFLA branding (previous format)

Technical information
- Licensing authority: FCC
- Facility ID: 61262
- Class: C0
- ERP: 100,000 watts
- HAAT: 303 meters (994 ft)
- Transmitter coordinates: 29.819389°N 85.259361°W

Links
- Public license information: Public file; LMS
- Webcast: Listen live (via iHeartRadio)
- Website: 945rocks.iheart.com

WFLF-FM (94.5 MHz) is a commercial radio station licensed to Parker, Florida, and serving the Panama City area of the Florida Panhandle. It airs an active rock radio format and is owned and operated by iHeartMedia, Inc. In morning drive time, it carries the syndicated Lex and Terry show, based in Dallas. Afternoon's are voice tracked from Big Rig, based at WXTB in Tampa.

WFLF-FM is a Class C0 FM station. It has an effective radiated power (ERP) of 100,000 watts, the maximum for most stations. The transmitter and tower are on Old Niles Transroad in Port St. Joe.

== History ==
=== Early years ===
The station signed on the air in August 1977. It originally broadcast at 93.5 MHz and had the call sign WGCV. The station's city of license was Port St. Joe, Florida. In 1982, Don Crisp bought WGCV, along with WJOE (1080 AM), and upgraded the FM signal to 94.5 with 100 kW of power.

In 1983, the stations were sold to Brown Broadcasting (affiliated with John Brown University of Siloam Springs, Arkansas). It switched its call letters to WJST. WJOE's call sign was also changed to WJBU, where they would stay until the station's last days in 1989. WJST was originally an album rock station called "T-94". Initially, WJST was on a shorter, 500-foot (150 m) tower, also used by its AM sister station at 1080 kHz. In 1986, WJST moved to a 1,000-foot (300 m) tower.

=== Heavy metal and southern gospel ===
Brown Broadcasting sold the stations to Champion Broadcasting in 1986. Champion immediately sold the stations to Asterisk, Inc. WJST then became a country music station, but proved unable to compete effectively with the already established WPAP. WJST had a call letter change to WWZR in 1989, and adopted the Satellite Music Network's "Z Rock" heavy metal format. This hard rock sound only lasted until January 28, 1990, when the station made a dramatic switch to southern gospel music. That was the format for only one year.

From 1991 until 1993, the station was a member of Satellite Music Network's "Real Country" network. In 1993, the station's call letters were changed again to WKNB. Marketed as "B94.5", WKNB aired a modern country format for just under a year. Then in 1994, its call sign was changed to WPBH and it operated under the name "Beach 94.5" for three years, playing a classic hits format. Owner Southern Broadcasting Companies would sell WPBH and WPAP to Paxson Communications in May 1996, becoming a sister to WFSY, WGNE, and WEBZ.

=== Pirate Radio, talk and active rock ===
Paxson would sell its radio holdings to Clear Channel Communications, now iHeartMedia, in July 1997. In mid-1999, the station's call sign was changed to WPPT, branded as "Pirate Radio 94.5". The second station in the Panama City market to bear the "Pirate Radio" moniker, it was preceded by WTBB from 1992 to 1997.

Pirate Radio existed until 2002. At that point, the station flipped to an active rock format called "The Fox 94.5". Its call letters were changed to WFBX. This lasted until 2007, when, after the call letters were changed to WFLF-FM, it became a talk radio station, carrying news updates from Fox News Radio. WFLF-FM cross-branded with another Florida talk stations owned by Clear Channel, WFLA in Tampa Bay. WFLF-FM shared much of WFLA's conservative talk radio lineup from co-owned Premiere Networks. The talk format lasted from 2007 to 2021.

On September 15, 2021, WFLF-FM began stunting with Christmas music, branded as "Christmas 94.5". This happened even though Christmas was more than three months away. In addition, the WFLA talk radio programming moved to two FM translators, fed by WPAP-HD2. At 5 p.m. on September 17, 2021, WFLF-FM flipped to mainstream rock as "Rock 94.5".
