= WFSY =

- Panama City, Florida; United States
- Broadcast area: Panama City, Florida
- Frequency: 98.5 MHz (HD Radio)
- Branding: Sunny 98.5

Programming
- Format: Adult contemporary
- Affiliations: Premiere Networks

Ownership
- Owner: iHeartMedia; (iHM Licenses, LLC)
- Sister stations: WEBZ, WFLF-FM, WPAP

History
- First air date: 1971; 55 years ago (as WGNE-FM)
- Former call signs: WGNE-FM (1971–1987)
- Call sign meaning: "Florida Sunny"

Technical information
- Licensing authority: FCC
- Facility ID: 66667
- Class: C0
- ERP: 96,000 watts; 100,000 watts (W/beam tilt)
- HAAT: 330 meters (1,080 ft)
- Transmitter coordinates: 30°30′42.7″N 85°29′16.9″W

Links
- Public license information: Public file; LMS
- Webcast: Listen Live
- Website: sunny985.iheart.com

WFSY (98.5 FM) is a radio station which normally broadcasts an adult contemporary format but during the holidays, broadcasts Christmas music. Licensed to Panama City, Florida, United States, the station also serves the Dothan, Alabama, market. The station is currently owned by iHeartMedia and features programming from iHeart subsidiary Premiere Networks. Current morning programming includes that of Murphy, Sam, and Jodi.

== History ==
WFSY went on the air as WGNE-FM in 1971, an FM simulcast of AM beautiful music station WGNE. Because of its position at 98.5 MHz, its callsign was advertised as standing for "Genie Ninety Eight", rather than the AM station's, which just represented its tagline, "Genie Radio".

The station adopted a beautiful music format in quadraphonic stereo on January 4, 1975, rebranding to "Q-98" until at least 1978.

After the AM station was sold to Gulf Coast Community College (now Gulf Coast State College) in 1982, the station flipped to an oldies format, which lasted until 1987.

In 1987, WGNE-FM became WFSY, marketed as "Sunny 98.5", and flipped from oldies to adult contemporary.

In 1997, WFSY, WPBH, WDIZ, and WPAP were sold to iHeartMedia (then known as Clear Channel).
