= 89.3 FM =

FM radio frequency

The following radio stations broadcast on FM frequency 89.3 MHz:

== Argentina ==
- Alba in Tartagal, Salta
- Alto perfil in Salta
- Camco in Santa Fe de la Vera Cruz, Santa Fe
- Flash in Villa Constitución, Santa Fe
- Gráfica in Buenos Aires
- La 20 in Pérez, Santa Fe
- La Petrolera in Comodoro Rivadavia, Chubut
- Popular in Rosario, Santa Fe
- La Red San Juan in San Juan
- Manantial LRH 338 in Villa Angela, Chaco
- Máxima in Córdoba
- Puerto Tirol in Puerto Tirol, Chaco
- Radio María in Santa Rosa, La Pampa
- Radio María in Choele–Choel, Río Negro
- Radio María in Reconquista, Santa Fe
- Raíces in Venado Tuerto, Santa Fe
- Sensitive in Buenos Aires
- Sudamericana in Rio Seco, Tucuman

== Australia ==
- 2GLF in Sydney
- 5GFM in Yorke Peninsula, South Australia
- 7LA in Launceston, Tasmania

== Brazil ==
- ZYS 374 in Maués, Amazonas
- ZYS 737 in Candeias, Bahia
- ZYV 527 in Ipiaú, Bahia
- ZYO 460 in Cristalina, Espírito Santo
- ZYL 272 in Ouro Preto, Minas Gerais
- ZYD 690 in Porto Alegre, Rio Grande do Sul

== Canada (Channel 207) ==
- CBGA-10-FM in Gaspe, Quebec
- CBGA-12-FM in Marsoui, Quebec
- CBOD-FM in Maynooth, Ontario
- CBON-FM-20 in Thunder Bay, Ontario
- CBW-1-FM in Winnipeg, Manitoba
- CFVT-FM in Vancouver, British Columbia
- CFWE-FM-2 in Peigan/Blood Reserve, Alberta
- CIBB-FM in Burgeo, Newfoundland and Labrador
- CIBN-FM in Buffalo Narrows, Saskatchewan
- CIJK-FM in Kentville, Nova Scotia
- CIRA-FM-3 in Victoriaville, Quebec
- CISM-FM in Montreal, Quebec
- CIWE-FM in Edmonton, Alberta
- CJLF-FM-2 in Peterborough, Ontario
- CKCM-1-FM in Springdale, Newfoundland and Labrador
- CKGW-FM in Chatham, Ontario
- VF2343 in Logan Lake, British Columbia
- VF2456 in Weyakwin, Saskatchewan
- VF2551 in Armstrong, British Columbia

== China ==
- CNR Music Radio in Taiyuan
- CNR The Voice of China in Guangzhou

== Indonesia ==
- Prambors FM in Surabaya, East Java

== Israel ==
- Galei Yisrael in the Judea and Samaria Area

== Malaysia ==
- Ai FM in Kuala Lumpur
- Lite in Taiping, Perak

== Mexico ==
- XHART-FM in Zacatepec, Morelos
- XHCC-FM in Colima, Colima
- XHCH-FM in Toluca, Estado de México
- XHFA-FM in Chihuahua, Chihuahua
- XHFF-FM in Matehuala, San Luis Potosí
- XHJBC-FM in San Juan Bautista Coixtlahuaca, Oaxaca
- XHKW-FM in Morelia, Michoacán
- XHLLV-FM in Tula, Hidalgo
- XHMIA-FM in Mérida (Kanasin), Yucatán
- XHMON-FM in Monterrey, Nuevo León
- XHNP-FM in Puebla, Puebla
- XHOEX-FM in Texcoco, Estado de México
- XHRRR-FM in Papantla de Olarte, Veracruz
- XHQQQ-FM in Villahermosa (Ixtacomitán), Tabasco
- XHSPS-FM in San Luis Potosí, San Luis Potosí
- XHSRD-FM in Santiago Papasquiaro, Durango
- XHTOT-FM in Pueblo Viejo, Veracruz
- XHUDO-FM in Los Mochis, Sinaloa
- XHZX-FM in Tenosique, Tabasco

== Morocco ==
- Med Radio at Agadir

== Philippines ==
- DWWQ-FM in Tuguegarao, Cagayan
- DWIZ-FM in Dagupan
- DWIF in Lucena
- DYYQ in Kalibo
- DYBA in San Carlos, Negros Occidental
- DXKB in Cagayan De Oro
- DXZA in Cotabato
- DXJA in Tandag

== Singapore ==
- Money FM 89.3 in Singapore

== United States (Channel 207) ==
- KAER in Mesquite, Nevada
- KAIH in Lake Havasu City, Arizona
- KAKX in Mendocino, California
- KALU in Langston, Oklahoma
- KAOS (FM) in Olympia, Washington
- KASB in Bellevue, Washington
- KATB in Anchorage, Alaska
- KAVK in Many, Louisiana
- KAWX in Mena, Arkansas
- KAYH in Fayetteville, Arkansas
- KAZC in Dickson, Oklahoma
- KBHE in Rapid City, South Dakota
- KBRZ-FM in Victoria, Texas
- KCAI in Linden, California
- KCCU in Lawton, Oklahoma
- KCMP in Northfield, Minnesota
- KCRI in Indio, California
- KCUR in Kansas City, Missouri
- KDNG in Durango, Colorado
- KELP in Mesquite, New Mexico
- KEYK in Osage Beach, Missouri
- KHCP in Paris, Texas
- KHEM in Zapata, Texas
- KHLW in Tabor, Iowa
- KIEL in Loyal, Oklahoma
- KIPO (FM) in Honolulu, Hawaii
- KJCF in Asotin, Washington
- KJMC in Des Moines, Iowa
- KJPN in Payson, Arizona
- KJTF in North Platte, Nebraska
- KKLK in Savoonga, Alaska
- KKLT in Texarkana, Arkansas
- KKNL in Valentine, Nebraska
- KLBV in Steamboat Springs, Colorado
- KLBZ in Bozeman, Montana
- KLFF in San Luis Obispo, California
- KLGG in Kellogg, Idaho
- KLKR (FM) in Elko, Nevada
- KLMT in Billings, Montana
- KLOV in Winchester, Oregon
- KLRB in Stuart, Oklahoma
- KLRS in Linden, California
- KMTG in San Jose, California
- KMVS in Moss Beach, California
- KNAQ in Prescott, Arizona
- KNAR in San Angelo, Texas
- KNDZ in McKinleyville, California
- KNON in Dallas, Texas
- KNPH in Havre, Montana
- KOGL (FM) in Gleneden Beach, Oregon
- KOHL in Fremont, California
- KOPJ in Sebeka, Minnesota
- KPCC in Pasadena, California
- KPDO in Pescadero, California
- KPFB in Berkeley, California
- KPJP in Greenville, California
- KPRG in Agana, Guam
- KQEI in North Highlands, California
- KQQN in Nome, Alaska
- KQQS in Sitka, Alaska
- KRSF in Ridgecrest, California
- KRSW in Worthington, Minnesota
- KSBJ in Humble, Texas
- KSSO in Norman, Oklahoma
- KSVQ in Gambell, Alaska
- KTAW in Walsenburg, Colorado
- KTBJ in Festus, Missouri
- KTDH in Dalhart, Texas
- KTDX in Laramie, Wyoming
- KTHL in Altus, Oklahoma
- KTPD in Del Rio, Texas
- KUGS in Bellingham, Washington
- KUND in Grand Forks, North Dakota
- KUOI in Moscow, Idaho
- KUOU in Roosevelt, Utah
- KUSL in Richfield, Utah
- KUVO in Denver, Colorado
- KVIX in Port Angeles, Washington
- KVPR in Fresno, California
- KVRA in Sisters, Oregon
- KWCF in Sheridan, Wyoming
- KXNE in Norfolk, Nebraska
- KYAI in McKee, Kentucky
- KYPB in Big Timber, Montana
- KZAO in Ajo, Arizona
- KZUM in Lincoln, Nebraska
- WAII in Hattiesburg, Mississippi
- WAJJ in Mckenzie, Tennessee
- WALN in Carrollton, Alabama
- WAMH in Amherst, Massachusetts
- WATU in Port Gibson, Mississippi
- WBFJ in Winston-Salem, North Carolina
- WBJY in Americus, Georgia
- WBLD in Orchard Lake, Michigan
- WCDV-LP in Lynn, Massachusetts
- WCGP in Silver Creek, New York
- WCSB in Cleveland, Ohio
- WDLM in East Moline, Illinois
- WDWZ in Andalusia, Alabama
- WECC in Folkston, Georgia
- WEQS in Sparta, Wisconsin
- WFJS-FM in Freehold, New Jersey
- WFLJ in Frostproof, Florida
- WFPL in Louisville, Kentucky
- WGCF in Paducah, Kentucky
- WGNB in Zeeland, Michigan
- WGNJ in Saint Joseph, Illinois
- WGSS (FM) in Copiague, New York
- WGSU in Geneseo, New York
- WHFR in Dearborn, Michigan
- WHSN in Bangor, Maine
- WIKV in Plymouth, Indiana
- WIMV in Owingsville, Kentucky
- WIPA in Pittsfield, Illinois
- WIRC in Ely, Minnesota
- WJCS in Allentown, Pennsylvania
- WJEL in Indianapolis, Indiana
- WJIK in Fulton, Alabama
- WJKN in Spring Arbor, Michigan
- WJVP in Culebra, Puerto Rico
- WKFA in Saint Catherine, Florida
- WKKC in Chicago, Illinois
- WKRT in Richmond, Indiana
- WKRW in Wooster, Ohio
- WLFJ in Greenville, South Carolina
- WLJP in Monroe, New York
- WLRH in Huntsville, Alabama
- WMHN in Webster, New York
- WMKV in Reading, Ohio
- WMKW in Crossville, Tennessee
- WMSJ in Freeport, Maine
- WMWG-LP in Glendale, Wisconsin
- WNJB in Bridgeton, New Jersey
- WNJY in Netcong, New Jersey
- WNKJ in Hopkinsville, Kentucky
- WNPN in Newport, Rhode Island
- WNSS in Palm Coast, Florida
- WNUR in Evanston, Illinois
- WPFW in Washington, District of Columbia
- WPIO in Titusville, Florida
- WPJN in Jemison, Alabama
- WPNE (FM) in Green Bay, Wisconsin
- WPZR in Emporia, Virginia
- WQED in Pittsburgh, Pennsylvania
- WQPH in Shirley, Massachusetts
- WRDV in Warminster, Pennsylvania
- WRFE in Chesterfield, South Carolina
- WRFG in Atlanta, Georgia
- WRKF in Baton Rouge, Louisiana
- WRMB in Boynton Beach, Florida
- WRTC in Hartford, Connecticut
- WRVH (FM) in Clayton, New York
- WSCI in Charleston, South Carolina
- WSGG in Norfolk, Connecticut
- WSHA in South Charleston, West Virginia
- WSHN in Munising, Michigan
- WSKG in Binghamton, New York
- WSMB in Harbor Beach, Michigan
- WSOE in Elon, North Carolina
- WTBU in Boston, Massachusetts
- WTEB in New Bern, North Carolina
- WTLI in Bear Creek Township, Michigan
- WUON in Morris, Illinois
- WVTU in Charlottesville, Virginia
- WVWS in Webster Springs, West Virginia
- WXMW in Sycamore, Ohio
- WXYC in Chapel Hill, North Carolina
- WYPL in Memphis, Tennessee
- WYSM in Lima, Ohio
- WYSZ in Maumee, Ohio
- WYTJ in Linton, Indiana
- WZCP in Chillicothe, Ohio
- WZNP in Newark, Ohio
- WZRI in Spring Lake, North Carolina
- WZVK in Glasgow, Kentucky

== Vietnam ==
- ThuDucRadio in Thu Duc, Ho Chi Minh City
