= WRHA =

WRHA may refer to:

- WALI, a radio station (1280 AM) licensed to serve Dayton, Tennessee, United States, which held the call sign WRHA in 2019
- WDNT (AM), a radio station (970 AM) licensed to serve Spring City, Tennessee, which held the call sign WRHA from 2010 to 2019
- Winnipeg Regional Health Authority
