= KUCB-FM (Iowa) =

Radio station in Des Moines, Iowa (1981–1998)

- Des Moines, Iowa; United States
- Frequency: 89.3 MHz

Programming
- Format: Community/variety

Ownership
- Owner: Center for the Study and Application of Black Economic Development

History
- First air date: August 1, 1981
- Last air date: July 1998
- Call sign meaning: Urban Community Broadcasting

Technical information
- Facility ID: 14680
- Class: C3
- ERP: 9,500 watts
- HAAT: 50 m (160 ft)
- Transmitter coordinates: 41°35′35″N 93°37′48″W

KUCB-FM was a radio station broadcasting on 89.3 FM in Des Moines, Iowa. The station aired programming aimed at the African American community in central Iowa. The station was on air from 1981 until 1998; its license renewal was successfully challenged in a seven-year legal battle that dragged on for most of the 1990s over an unauthorized two-year silence period and the illegal presence of a convicted felon as an officer of the station's licensee. A new minority station, KJMC, went on the air in 1999 as a result of a competing application to the license renewal.

== History ==
=== Early years and tower site fight ===
In 1976, a Human Rights Commission task force determined that Des Moines media was not adequately meeting the needs of the city's minority residents; according to one study, its existing radio stations presented fewer than 10 hours a week of minority-oriented programming. The effort to build a minority radio station was spearheaded by Charles Knox, a former head of the local Black Panther Party, and Joeanna Cheatom, who would be described as the founder of KUCB. Also involved in founding the station was Edna Griffin, who in 1948 had protested the refusal of the Katz Drug Store lunch counter downtown to serve Black customers.

On December 30, 1977, the Center for the Study of Black Theology applied to build a new noncommercial educational radio station at 89.3 in Des Moines. The center's application was approved by the Federal Communications Commission (FCC) on February 26, 1979. However, that same year, the station's first efforts to get on air were frustrated by internal strife, which prompted the group to return much of a grant it had received for staff. The center, also known as Urban Community Broadcasting, received a $25,000 grant from the city of Des Moines in 1980 to help put the station on the air. At the time, the only Black media in Des Moines was a tabloid newspaper known as the Iowa Bystander.

Before even going on air with a permanent facility, KUCB-FM attracted controversy in Des Moines. It had proposed initially to place its tower atop the Financial Center downtown. However, the station eventually filed to build a 100-foot (30 m) tower in a residential area at the Gateway Center, a community center located at 801 Forest Avenue (it went on the air August 1, 1981, from a temporary facility attached to a chimney). This prompted local residents to oppose the project because it took away an outdoor basketball court and they feared electrical interference. The case reached the Des Moines Zoning Board of Adjustment on August 18; after the board denied Urban Community Broadcasting's request for a variance to build KUCB-FM by a 3–2 vote, station advisory board chair Kalonji Saadiq hurled a wastebasket toward the chairman of the board, narrowly missing him; Saadiq, angry at what he perceived as the denial of 20,000 Black citizens, called the board "trash". Saadiq, another former Black Panther who later hosted a talk show on KUCB and rose to the post of station manager, was no stranger to Des Moines city politics; he ran for Congress with the Socialist Party in 1980 and mounted a campaign for mayor of Des Moines in 1983.

The editorial board of the Des Moines Tribune wrote that the zoning board had made an improper decision in denying the tower application. The Center for the Study and Application of Black Economic Development—as KUCB-FM's licensee became known—appealed the city decision to the Polk County District Court, which issued a default judgment in favor of the radio station, though the city vowed to appeal. The same judge reaffirmed the judgment two weeks later.

The tower site was not the only source of turmoil in KUCB-FM's first months on air—the station went through three managers in 1981 alone—but KUCB-FM was able to begin regular broadcasting. The station broadcast 20 hours a day on weekdays (21 on weekends); its output included gospel, jazz and reggae music, church services and talk shows. KUCB quickly became a pillar of the local community; its job ads helped the city implement its affirmative action program, while the station worked to defuse racial tension stemming from a series of police incidents in 1982. In 1983, it relocated from the Gateway Center—part of which was boarded up—to newer and larger space at 1430 University Avenue. The station received a $20,000 grant from the Des Moines City Council in January 1984 over the objections of an atheist activist who opposed the subsidy of a gospel music outlet.

=== Mid-1980s ===
Joeanna Cheatom, KUCB-FM's founder, died on April 27, 1984; the station suspended its regular programming the next day and played gospel music in tribute. At this time, the first signs of potential financial trouble appeared. That August, Charles Knox had to deny rumors that the federal government was seeking to force KUCB-FM off the air, though he did admit that the station was being audited over the original 1970s grant from the Central Iowa Regional Association of Local Governments (CIRALG). However, the station was making other progress; at the same time, Knox announced the receipt of a $72,000 Department of Commerce grant to add new equipment and begin stereo operations. A 1984 Iowa Public Television documentary, Black Frequencies, profiled the state's three African American radio stations: KUCB-FM, KOJC in Cedar Rapids, and KBBG in Waterloo. The station continued its community service efforts, including non-alcoholic, drug-free parties that were the brainchild of three DJs.

The winter of 1985–1986 brought with it new technical troubles. The cold weather caused a malfunction in KUCB-FM's transmitter that caused it to broadcast as much as 600 kHz off its assigned frequency, interfering with classical music outlet WOI-FM 90.1 and high school station KWDM 88.9. The situation was so bad some listeners of KUCB thought it was off the air, while interference complaints piled up from WOI-FM's listeners. WOI offered engineering support to fix the problem, but it could not get KUCB to reply to its overtures.

=== Plunge into silence ===
Internal turmoil dominated KUCB-FM in 1986. That July, station manager Al Saladin was dismissed for broadcasting speeches of Louis Farrakhan on the station and not bringing in enough fundraising revenue. First vice president Iris "Sissy" Ward, Cheatom's daughter, said of Saladin, "He was supposed to be writing grant proposals, but he didn't want to take money from white folks." The station raised $3,000 from an emergency radiothon, enough to stay afloat for another month, but its broadcasts had become intermittent. In November, Jamal Akil (aka Jamal Long), who had been on the KUCB-FM board since the station signed on, resigned, claiming that under Ward, white people had too much influence on the operation of the radio station in such actions as the removal of Farrakhan's preaching, the reduction of gospel music in the station's broadcast day, and the discontinuation of its prayer hotline. Akil claimed that founder Joeanna Cheatom would have disapproved of these changes. Ward defended the changes as recommended and necessary to keep the station operational, said that Saladin's "blacks only" separatist line had hurt it, and stated that she wanted to evolve KUCB along the lines of a public radio station.

Adding to the station's troubles was the discovery in December 1986 that KUCB-FM still did not have the license to cover its construction permit; it had, however, filed for the license in October 1984. The next month, Ward and board chairman William Talbert were removed by the KUCB board, while Akil had returned as a show host and many of Ward's changes were reverted.

Behind the new course of action for the station was Charles Knox, whose legal problems were becoming relevant to KUCB-FM's future; by January 1987, he was awaiting trial in a Chicago federal court on charges of selling arms to Libya. Two months later, he was convicted as posing as one of his co-defendant's attorneys to visit him in prison, while testimony in the arms case revealed that Knox and two other conspirators associated with the El Rukn street gang traveled to Libya and made an offer to Muammar Gaddafi to commit terrorist acts in the United States in exchange for $2 million. In April, new general manager Ako Abdul-Samad said that despite being the chairman of the board of directors of Urban Community Broadcasting, the Knox conviction would not impact KUCB, as he had no hand in the day-to-day decision making at the station. The station also sought money to pay operational expenses and had repaired remote control and Emergency Broadcast System equipment (which it had at one point lacked) to help keep it within FCC regulations; it also added a talk show for Hispanics and a legal advice program.

However, by May 1987, KUCB-FM had gone off the air, mired in financial troubles and having suffered damage to its transmitter. The revolving door of leadership spun once again: a new administrative assistant-general manager, Lorenzo Creighton, was appointed in July by Charles Knox—who still bore the role of station president—to restore order to the station's distressed finances. Creighton replaced Samad and was the radio station's third general manager in seven months.

One group appeared late in the year in the effort to return KUCB-FM to operational status: Association of Community Organizations for Reform Now (ACORN), which desired to provide assistance but could not get in touch with Urban Community Broadcasting officials to make the offer, or indeed, find someone who could speak for the embattled and silent station, as Iris Ward was still the president in state records. The group estimated that it would take $35,000 to restore KUCB to the air, including $20,000 to replace the transmitter and the payment of $6,700 in FCC fines.

After more than two and a half years off the air, KUCB-FM returned in December 1989 with a limited schedule of programming, operating just seven hours on weekdays (and from 6 a.m. to midnight on weekends) with an all-volunteer staff.

=== License renewal fight ===
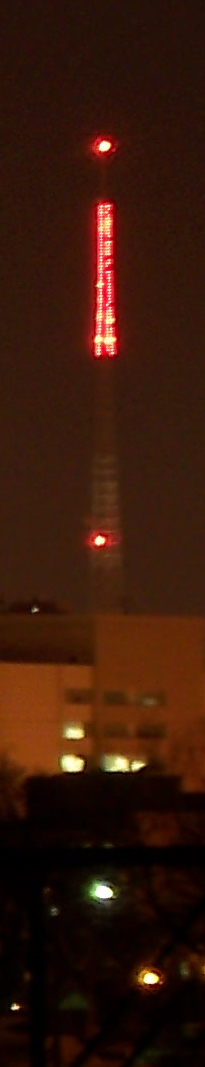
The KCCI weather beacon tower (seen in 2008) was KUCB-FM's final transmitter site

While KUCB had survived to broadcast into the 1990s, it had done so without notifying the Federal Communications Commission of its lengthy silence. The first word the FCC had of the station being silent was a September 1987 letter from Commonwealth Electric Company, which was trying to locate the person responsible for the silent station. On January 8, 1990, the FCC ordered KUCB-FM to show cause why its license should not be revoked for leaving the air without the requisite authorization. In fact, KUCB-FM had been off air the entire time since finally receiving a license in June 1988. When FCC representatives visited the studio site in March and April 1989, they found it abandoned, and the second time they did so, the power had been disconnected. The FCC also proposed a fine of up to $20,000. The station did manage a major technical improvement in 1990 when its transmitter was relocated to the KCCI TV weather beacon tower in downtown Des Moines. By this time, KUCB-FM had settled in at the offices of nonprofit organization Urban Dreams; its executive director, future Iowa state representative Wayne Ford, also was the radio station's president. Ford, who had previously been a talk show host on the station until he endorsed Walter Mondale on air in 1984, rejoined the station on one condition: that Charles Knox be removed. Its programming remained much the same, though it had a Tuesday night block of Hispanic programs.

In 1991, the KUCB-FM revocation proceeding was converted into a serious renewal battle when the FCC designated the license for hearing opposite rival bids—one led by ACORN and another headed by KDMI radio personality Larry Nevilles—both promising minority-oriented programming. In designating the applications for comparative hearing, the FCC pointed not only to the silence and technical issues but also to Knox's criminal record and the station's failure to disclose it in the renewal application. That record, in addition to the Libya case, also included facts directly related to KUCB: Knox had embezzled $31,000 of the $72,000 Department of Commerce grant issued in 1984, diverting it in 1985 and 1986 to an automotive company in Chicago. ACORN called a press conference in November 1991 in an attempt to say that it was not a hostile challenger for KUCB-FM's frequency, but the event turned confrontational when ACORN officials called police to have station manager Kalonji Saadiq and others barred from the room. Station officials claimed that the other competing applicant—Minority Communications, headed by Nevilles—would in actuality run a Christian radio station, citing Nevilles's position as a DJ at KDMI, which broadcast religious programming. They also said that the real reason for the competing challenges was the Muslim influence at KUCB-FM; the station had returned to broadcasting Louis Farrakhan's speeches, something that ACORN president Pauline Green wanted to bring to an end. One bright spot for the station took place in 1992, when Dorothy Gladden, host of the Gospel Train program, married Byron Moore, who hosted The Blues Train on KUCB-FM, after Moore proposed to Gladden on the air.

KUCB-FM's license defense got off to an inauspicious start in early 1992 when it missed a hearing and its lawyer, Alfredo Parrish, called the FCC meeting a "waste of time"; the station said it was not aware he needed to appear in person in Washington instead of telephonically. In testimony that August, Abdul-Samad and Long claimed that KUCB-FM had been sabotaged throughout its time off air and after a falling out with Nevilles, who criticized the station within the Des Moines Black community. Their memories were not as clear as to when they learned of Knox's felon status and whether documents sent to the FCC about the station's ownership were accurate. Lawyers for the FCC argued that KUCB-FM had broadcast appeals for Knox's legal defense fund and had discussed his conviction on a station call-in show.

On March 26, 1993, FCC administrative law judge Richard Sippel ruled that KUCB-FM's license renewal should be denied and that Minority Communications should be awarded the frequency. He found that the Center for the Study and Application of Black Economic Development should be disqualified for willfully intending to deceive the FCC about its knowledge of Knox's felony and for the unapproved silence of KUCB-FM, and that ACORN was financially unqualified to be the licensee. KUCB's principals claimed Sippel's findings were "totally incorrect" and constituted "political persecution" by groups such as the government and local police who were opponents of the station.

KUCB's presence in the community continued to be somewhat polarized. A representative for city police officers, who had complained of "anti-police" comments on the station's air, said that they were "glad" to hear of the ruling. Another group that had found negative comments on KUCB's air was the local Jewish community: the president of the Jewish Community Relations Committee had declined several invitations to appear on the station over a radio show it aired that claimed that Jews had conspired to bomb the World Trade Center and blame Muslims. However, its supporters pointed to stories the station had broken—such as Pizza Hut's refusal to deliver to some inner-city areas—and the station's charitable efforts and sponsorship of rap concerts. Looking back, a 2004 Des Moines Register story credited KUCB for introducing many central Iowans to hip-hop music.

KUCB-FM lost its first appeal, to the FCC Review Board, in February 1995; the board affirmed the ALJ's finding and the grant to Minority Communications. KUCB, and its lawyer Parrish, announced their intention to appeal to the full commission. The FCC rejected the appeal in February 1996. With the station's options at the commission exhausted, KUCB lawyer Alfredo Parrish appealed to the United States Court of Appeals for the District of Columbia, alleging that administrative law judge Sippel was "prejudiced" and the FCC was ignoring its own policies to promote minority radio ownership. After losing at the D.C. Circuit and in its bid to be heard at the Supreme Court, the 89.3 frequency finally fell silent in the summer of 1998. The new Minority Communications station took the call letters KJMC and began test broadcasts in March 1999.

=== Post-license pirate operations ===
Even though KUCB-FM ceased operations at 89.3, it still maintained control of all of its studio and broadcasting equipment. Several ex-KUCB personnel started a pirate radio station at 90.5 MHz, calling itself "The Voice of Liberation Radio", in the fall of 1998. In June 1999, the FCC raided the home of Sekou Mtayari, who had been responsible for the pirate operation, and seized its transmitter, shutting it down.
