= WALV =

WALV may refer to:

- WALV-CD, a low-power television station (channel 17, virtual 46) licensed to serve Indianapolis, Indiana, United States
- WALV-FM, a radio station (95.3 FM) licensed to serve Ooltewah, Tennessee, United States
- WUIE, a radio station (105.1 FM) licensed to serve Lakeside, Tennessee, which held the call sign WALV-FM from 2006 to 2021
- Bunyu Airport, Indonesia (ICAO code WALV)
