= WDNT =

WDNT may refer to:

- WDNT (AM), a radio station (970 AM) licensed to serve Spring City, Tennessee, United States
- WALI, a radio station (1280 AM) licensed to serve Dayton, Tennessee, which held the call sign WDNT from 1958 to 2006 and from 2006 to 2019
