= WBIN =

WBIN may refer to:

- WBIN (AM), a radio station (640 AM) licensed to Atlanta, Georgia, United States
- WBIN (Tennessee), a defunct radio station (1540 AM) formerly licensed to Benton, Tennessee, United States, known as WBIN from 1977 to 2020
- WWJE-DT, a television station (channel 35/PSIP 50) licensed to Derry, New Hampshire, United States, known as WBIN-TV from 2011 to 2018
- WSAA, a radio station (93.1 FM) licensed to Benton, Tennessee, known as WBIN-FM from 1996 to 1998
