= WECC =

WECC may refer to:

- WECC-FM, a radio station (89.3 FM) licensed to Folkston, Georgia, United States
- Western Electricity Coordinating Council
- World Electronic Circuits Council
