= WWRO =

WWRO may refer to:

- WJTQ, a radio station (100.7 FM) in Pensacola, Florida, which held the call sign WWRO from 1994 to 2000
- WEZG-LP, a radio station (102.5 FM) in Greenville, Mississippi, which held the call sign WWRO-LP in 2014 to 2019
- WBIN (Tennessee) a defunct radio station (1540 AM) in Benton, Tennessee, which held the call sign WWRO briefly while silent in 2020
