= KOJC =

Radio station in Cedar Rapids, Iowa (1978–1993)

Cedar Rapids, Iowa; United States
- Frequency: 89.7 MHz

Programming
- Format: community/variety

Ownership
- Owner: Oakhill-Jackson Economic Development Corporation

History
- First air date: June 30, 1978
- Last air date: 1993
- Call sign meaning: Oakhill-Jackson Community

Technical information
- Class: A
- ERP: 210 watts
- HAAT: 27 m (89 ft)
- Transmitter coordinates: 41°58′44″N 91°40′7″W

KOJC was a radio station in Cedar Rapids, Iowa, owned by the Oakhill-Jackson Economic Development Corporation. The station operated from June 1978 to 1993 and provided programming by and for the African American community in Cedar Rapids.

== History ==
The Oakhill-Jackson Economic Development Corporation received the construction permit for a new 10-watt FM radio station on September 28, 1976 after the idea was born at a community meeting in 1974. The station was built with a string of donations: two classrooms from St. Wenceslaus Catholic Church, a tower site donated by Cargill, as well as donated studio equipment and furniture. KOJC planned to include in its programming broadcasts from black churches, Mutual Black Network news, and other specials. The station signed on the air the evening of June 30, 1978, originally operating on weekends only until it expanded to seven-day operation in November. The station had 15 volunteers by year's end, adding the Mutual Black Network newscasts and children's programming in early 1979. Several children aged 5 through 13 were involved in the production of the youth shows.

KOJC moved in 1981 to new facilities at 626 Fifth Ave. SE. Three years later, it boosted its power to 200 watts. After a rough period for donations in the early 1980s, the station's financial situation was stabilizing by 1984; one of those donations came as part of a settlement in a dispute over the use of minority contractors at the Cedar Rapids airport. By the mid-1980s, Iowa was home to three of the country's ten African American, community-owned stations: KOJC, KUCB-FM in Des Moines and KBBG in Waterloo, which were all profiled in a 1984 documentary by Iowa Public Television. Further upgrades came in 1989 with a new studio at 1052 Mount Vernon Road SE, its fourth—and final—studio site.

Support faded for KOJC in the early 1990s, with fewer donations, increased debt, and an internal struggle among the group's board members, ultimately prompting the station to cease operations in the summer of 1993. In March 1996, the Federal Communications Commission ordered the Oakhill-Jackson Economic Development Corporation to show cause why its license should not be revoked. In the hearing, Oakhill-Jackson failed to appear. Despite an attempt to sell the station to Friendship Communications, owner of KWOF in Waterloo, and obtain reconsideration of the decision to revoke the license and delete the call letters, because Oakhill itself had no intention of returning KOJC to the air, the FCC upheld its decision in September 1997, deleting the license.
