= WGSS =

WGSS may refer to:

- WGSS (FM), a radio station (89.3 FM) licensed to Copiague, New York, United States
- WRZE, a radio station (94.1 FM) licensed to Kingstree, South Carolina, United States, which held the call sign WGSS from 1996 to 2009
- Walnut Grove Secondary School, a secondary school in Langley, British Columbia, Canada
- Women, gender, and sexuality studies, a broader scope to women's studies
