= WJKL =

WJKL may refer to:

- WJKL (FM), a radio station (105.7 FM) licensed to serve San Juan, Puerto Rico
- WKRT (FM), a radio station (89.3 FM) licensed to serve Richmond, Indiana, United States, which held the call sign WJKL from 2019 to 2020
- WAWE, a radio station (94.3 FM) licensed to serve Glendale Heights, Illinois, United States, which held the call sign WJKL from 1972 to 2019
