= WLUP =

WLUP may refer to:

- WLUP (FM), a radio station (105.3 FM) licensed to serve Cambridge, Minnesota, United States
- WSNO-FM, a radio station (97.9 FM) licensed to serve Au Sable, New York, United States, which held the call sign WLUP from March to June 2018
- WLSF, a radio station (88.3 FM) licensed to serve Starke, Florida, United States, which held the call sign WLUP-FM in March 2018
- WCKL (FM), a radio station (97.9 FM) licensed to serve Chicago, Illinois, United States, which held the call sign WLUP-FM from 1977 to 2018
- WMVP, a radio station (1000 AM) licensed to serve Chicago, Illinois, which held the call sign WLUP from 1987 to 1993
