= WKRT =

WKRT may refer to:

- WKRT (FM), a radio station (89.3 FM) licensed to serve Richmond, Indiana, United States, which held the call sign WKRT from 2009 to 2019 and since 2020
- WYBY, a radio station (920 AM) licensed to serve Cortland, New York, United States, which held the call sign WKRT from 1947 to 2007
