= XHOEX-FM =

Community radio station in Texcoco, State of Mexico, Mexico

- Texcoco, State of Mexico; Mexico
- Frequency: 89.3 FM
- Branding: La Uni-K

Programming
- Format: Regional Mexican

Ownership
- Owner: Omega Experimental, A.C.

History
- First air date: August 9, 2005 (permit)
- Call sign meaning: Omega EXperimental

Technical information
- ERP: 746 watts
- Transmitter coordinates: 19°30′14″N 98°53′23″W

Links
- Webcast: Listen live

XHOEX-FM is a noncommercial, social community radio station in Texcoco, State of Mexico, Mexico. Broadcasting on 89.3 FM, XHOEX is owned by Omega Experimental, A.C. and is known as La Uni-K.

== History ==
XHOEX received its permit on August 9, 2005. It was among the first new community radio stations permitted in Mexico in decades. It originally operated on 100.5 MHz before being approved to move to 89.3 in 2010.
