= WALV-FM =

Radio station in Ooltewah–Chattanooga, Tennessee, US

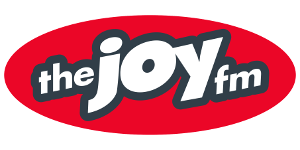
- Ooltewah, Tennessee; United States
- Broadcast area: Chattanooga metropolitan area
- Frequency: 95.3 MHz (HD Radio)
- Branding: The Joy FM

Programming
- Format: Christian adult contemporary
- Subchannels: HD2: Worship music; HD3: Christian radio; HD4: Christian CHR

Ownership
- Owner: Radio Training Network, Inc.

History
- First air date: February 27, 1980
- Former call signs: WQNE (1979–1983); WALV (1983–2006); WHJK (2006–2009); WPLZ (2009–2021)

Technical information
- Licensing authority: FCC
- Facility ID: 66956
- Class: C3
- ERP: 3,400 watts
- HAAT: 275 meters (902 ft)
- Transmitter coordinates: 35°8′54″N 85°1′22″W
- Translators: HD2: 106.9 W295BI (Chattanooga); HD3: 101.5 W268AA (Falling Water); HD3: 105.9 W290CA (Cleveland); HD4: 92.7 W224AZ (Chattanooga)

Links
- Public license information: Public file; LMS
- Webcast: Listen live; HD2: Listen live; HD3: Listen live; HD4: Listen live
- Website: florida.thejoyfm.com/features/welcome-chattanooga/; HD2: joyworship.com; HD3: www.radiobygrace.com; HD4: www.lf.radio

WALV-FM (95.3 FM) is a non-commercial radio station licensed to Ooltewah, Tennessee, United States, and serving the Chattanooga metropolitan area. Owned by Radio Training Network (RTN), the station airs programming from RTN's "The Joy FM" Christian adult contemporary network.

The transmitter and tower are along Taft Highway (U.S. Route 127) in Signal Mountain, Tennessee. WALV-FM broadcasts in HD Radio: its digital subchannels air formats ranging from worship music to Christian contemporary hit radio to Christian talk and teaching, and feed several FM translators.

== History ==
=== Christian, AC, Jack-FM ===
The station first signed on the air on February 27, 1980. The original call sign was WQNE. It had a Christian radio format until 1984, when it became an adult contemporary music station as WALV, known as "Alive 95". WALV was Chattanooga's affiliate for Rick Dees Weekly Top 40. The adult contemporary format continued throughout the 1980s and the 1990s. By the early 2000s, WALV picked up the tempo to become a hot adult contemporary station.

The "Alive 95" name was used for 22 years in total. In 2006, it began carrying the syndicated Jack FM adult hits format. It used the slogan "Playing what we want." The call letters switched to WHJK.

=== Talk radio WPLZ ===
On May 1, 2009, the station switched to a news-talk format using the name "Pulse News", with the Jack FM format relocating to WSAA 93.1 FM. The call letters on 95.3 changed to WPLZ. Pulse News was launched as a companion to the Brewer Media-owned alternative weekly newspaper The Chattanooga Pulse and featured longtime radio hosts Dale Deason in the morning and Zach Cooper in afternoons. Cooper served as the Publisher for the Chattanooga Pulse. Former WRCB-TV reporter Louis Lee served as News Director for the entire run of the station.

A year after launching, WPLZ separated itself from the Chattanooga Pulse editorially and changed its slogan to "News Talk 95.3 WPLZ". Among the hosts who worked on air at the station were Jay "The Jammer" Scott, Bobby Byrd, Max Hackett, Ed Ramsey, Logan Carmichael, Stuart James, and Gary Poole. Syndicated talk shows carried on WPLZ included Glenn Beck, Clark Howard, Dennis Miller, Jason Lewis, and Phil Hendrie. The station had news affiliations with both Fox News Radio and the Associated Press.

The news department won two Edward R. Murrow awards for its longform coverage of gang issues, and received several honorable mentions for news reporting from the Associated Press. Among the reporters and anchors who worked at the station were Jeremy Lawrence, Misty Brandon, Lysa Greer, Chris Peddie, and Mike Chambers.

In March 2011, Jim Brewer II, station owner, revamped the lineup with Gary Poole and Louis Lee in morning drive, former WGOW-FM host Robert T. Nash in early afternoons and WRCB-TV's David Karnes in afternoon drive. While the station started to show some modest ratings growth, Brewer felt that it wasn't growing fast enough to justify the expense, citing economics and inability to compete with Clear Channel Communications (now iHeartMedia) and Cumulus Broadcasting as the reason. In light of that, the station decided to let the entire staff go effective December 23, 2011.

=== Country, Classic Hits and Sports ===
On January 2, 2012, WPLZ changed its format to country music, branded as "Cat Country 95.3." It adopted the branding previously used by WQMT.

On June 1, 2015, WPLZ and WPLZ-HD2/W295BI swapped format. The "Cat Country" sound moved to WPLZ-HD2 and W295BI 106.9. Meanwhile, WPLZ's main 95.3 frequency switched to classic hits, branded as "Big 95.3". "Cat Country 106.9" lasted just over five months, as the station began playing Christmas music on November 2, 2015, as "Santa 106.9". On December 28, WPLZ-HD2 and W295BI flipped to oldies as a spinoff from Big, "106.9 The Big Easy", playing hits from the 50s to 70s. This lasted until November 1, 2016, when WPLZ-HD2 and W295BI switched to Christmas music, again as "Santa 106.9".

On December 26, 2016, WPLZ-HD2 and W295BI switched to Soft AC, branded as "Easy 106.9". The station aired the softer hits from the 1970s through the early 2000s.

On September 1, 2021, WPLZ changed its format from classic hits (which continues on WPLZ-HD2/W295BI) to sports radio, branded as "ESPN Chattanooga." It returned to using the WALV-FM call sign (moving from 105.1 FM, which switched to American Family Radio as WUIE).

=== Radio Training Network ===
On January 4, 2024, Brewer Media announced it would sell WALV-FM and its translators to the Radio Training Network. The price tag was $900,000. The stations would switch to a non-commercial status.

The sale closed on March 15 and, on March 25, the stations changed to RTN's assorted Christian music outlets. WALV-FM flipped to Christian adult contemporary as "The Joy FM" and WALV-HD2 and W295BI began airing contemporary worship music, carrying the "Joy Worship" network.

== Former logos ==
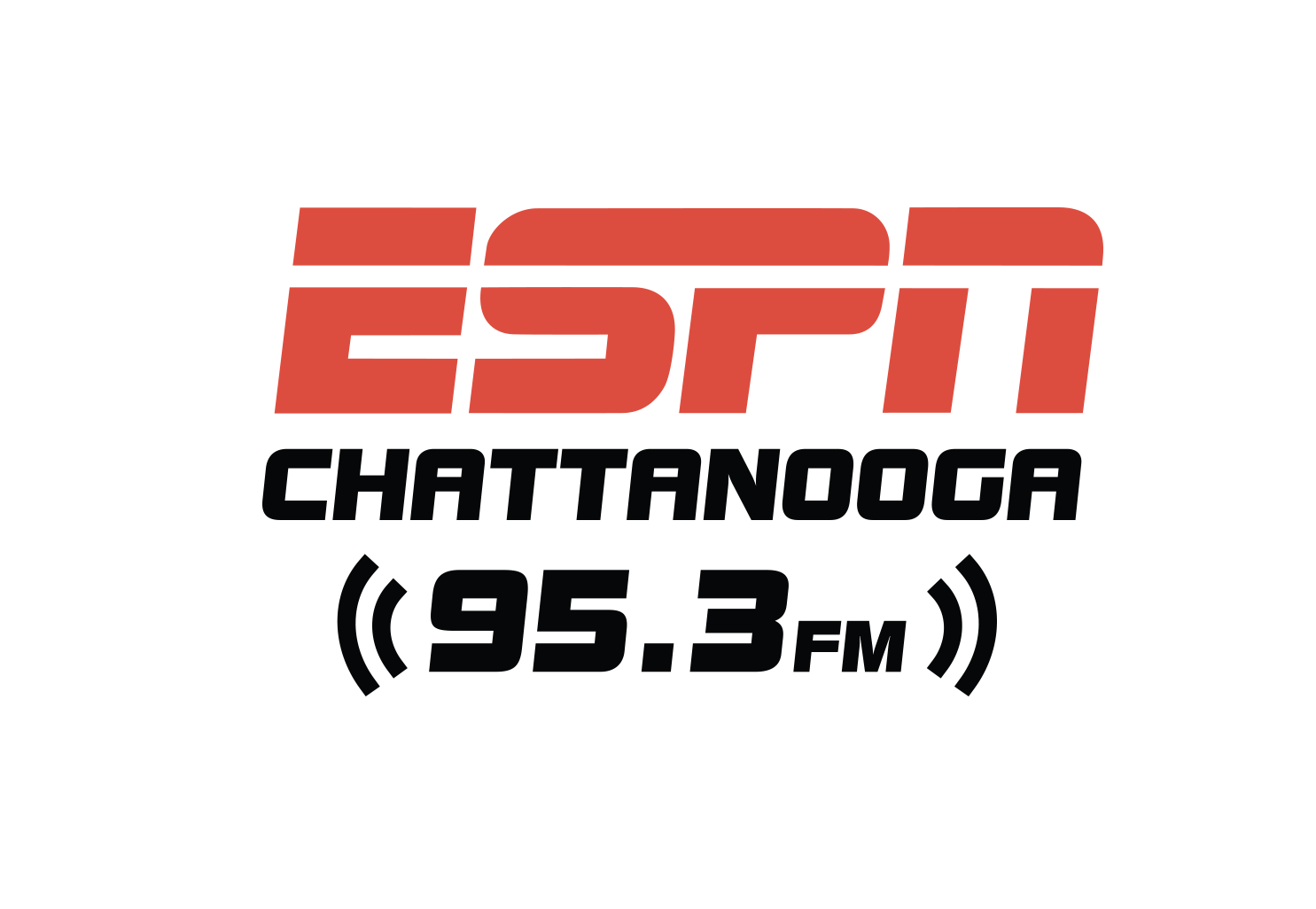
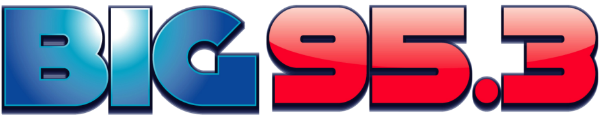

== WALV-FM-HD4 ==
On April 19, 2017, WPLZ added a news/talk format owned by Hot News Talk LLC. on its HD4 subchannel, and relays to a translator 92.7 (W224AZ) branded as NoogaRadio. The format moved from WSDT 1240 AM Soddy-Daisy, whose license was deleted by the FCC in September 2017. It changed to Christmas music In October 2021.

On September 7, 2022, WALV-FM HD4 changed its format from Christmas music to Spanish-language Contemporary, branded as "Tu Radio 92.7".

Following the sale of WALV-FM to Radio Training Network, the station ended the "Tu Radio" format and flipped to Christian contemporary hit radio under RTN's "LF Radio" network.
