= WAWF =

- Kankakee, Illinois; United States
- Broadcast area: Kankakee County, Illinois
- Frequency: 88.3 MHz
- Branding: "Sonlife Radio Network"

Programming
- Format: Christian
- Affiliations: SONLIFE Radio Network

Ownership
- Owner: Family Worship Center Church, Inc.
- Sister stations: WBMF, WWGN

History
- First air date: 2000

Technical information
- Licensing authority: FCC
- Facility ID: 78927
- Class: A
- ERP: 1,250 watts
- HAAT: 87 meters (285 ft)
- Transmitter coordinates: 41°4′39.0″N 87°45′22.0″W

Links
- Public license information: Public file; LMS
- Webcast: Listen live
- Website: http://sonlifetv.com/

WAWF (88.3 MHz) is a Christian radio station licensed to Kankakee, Illinois and serving Kankakee County, Illinois and northern Iroquois County. WAWF is owned and operated by Family Worship Center Church, Inc. The station began broadcasting in 2000. It was originally owned by the American Family Association and was an affiliate of American Family Radio. In 2004, the station was sold to Family Worship Center Church, along with WBMF and WWGN, for $1 million.
