= XHMIA-FM =

Radio station in Mérida, Yucatán, Mexico

- Kanasín–Mérida, Yucatán; Mexico
- Frequency: 89.3 FM
- Branding: Radio Mundo

Programming
- Format: News/Talk/English and spanish adult contemporary
- Affiliations: W Radio

Ownership
- Owner: Multimedia del Sureste, S.A. de C.V.

History
- First air date: September 24, 1992 (concession)
- Call sign meaning: "Mérida"

Technical information
- ERP: 50 kW
- Transmitter coordinates: 20°56′59.8″N 89°34′03.0″W

Links
- Webcast: Listen live
- Website: radiomundo.mx

XHMIA-FM is a radio station on 89.3 FM in Mérida, Yucatán, Mexico. It is owned by Multimedia del Sureste, S.A. de C.V. and carries an news and adult contemporary format known as Radio Mundo.

== History ==
XHTVY-FM received its concession on September 24, 1992, promptly changing its callsign to the current XHMIA-FM before signing on in 1996. It was known as "Mia 89.3" and was owned by Arturo Iglesias y Villalobos, with José Laris Iturbide of Cadena RASA assisting in operations. Though the station was not part of RASA's Yucatán cluster and was run from separate studios, Laris Iturbide became the 50-percent owner of the station's new concessionaire in 2010. The station changed names to N-ergy 89.3 in the early 2000s and Ultra 89.3 in 2008.

The station dropped the Ultra moniker in 2011 and the next year relaunched as Sona 89.3 with a pop format. On September 1, 2019, XHMIA relaunched as Wow 89.3, retaining the pop format. In 2022, the station changed names to Radio Mundo and shifted toward an adult contemporary format.
