= WBMF =

Radio station in Crete, Illinois

Coordinates: 41.421°N 87.644°W

- Crete, Illinois; United States
- Broadcast area: South Suburban Chicago
- Frequency: 88.1 MHz
- Branding: SonLife Radio Network

Programming
- Format: Christian radio
- Affiliations: SonLife Radio Network

Ownership
- Owner: Family Worship Center Church, Inc.
- Sister stations: WAWF

History
- First air date: 2002

Technical information
- Licensing authority: FCC
- Facility ID: 89339
- Class: A
- ERP: 90 watts
- HAAT: 114 meters (374 ft)

Links
- Public license information: Public file; LMS
- Webcast: Listen live
- Website: sonlifetv.com

WBMF is a Christian radio station licensed to Crete, Illinois, broadcasting on 88.1 FM. WBMF is owned and operated by Family Worship Center Church, Inc. The station began broadcasting in 2002. It was originally owned by the American Family Association and was an affiliate of American Family Radio. In 2004, the station was sold to Family Worship Center Church, along with WAWF and WWGN, for $1 million.
