= WLJR =

Birmingham, Alabama; United States
- Frequency: 88.5 MHz

Programming
- Format: Christian radio
- Affiliations: Moody Broadcasting Network, American Family Radio

Ownership
- Owner: Briarwood Presbyterian Church

History
- First air date: February 20, 1998
- Call sign meaning: Where the Lord Jesus Reigns

Technical information
- Licensing authority: FCC
- Facility ID: 6804
- Class: A
- ERP: 370 watts
- HAAT: 183 meters (600 feet)
- Transmitter coordinates: 33°23′51″N 86°39′41″W

Links
- Public license information: Public file; LMS
- Webcast: Listen Live
- Website: WLJR Online

WLJR (88.5 FM) is a non-commercial radio station licensed to Birmingham, Alabama. It is owned by Briarwood Presbyterian Church on Briarwood Way in Birmingham.

WLJR broadcasts a Christian radio format to the Greater Birmingham area. The station derives a majority of its programming from the Moody Broadcasting Network and American Family Radio (AFR). It is also available online at playwljr.com

== History ==
More than five years after the initial application was filed, this station received its original construction permit from the Federal Communications Commission on November 4, 1992. The new station was assigned the call letters WLJR by the FCC on February 10, 1993.

After several extensions, WLJR received its license to cover from the FCC on June 4, 1998. On-air broadcasting began February 20, 1998. In December 2013 WLJR began streaming on the Internet. This Internet stream may be accessed through the station's website, or directly at www.playwljr.com.
