= WHVK =

K-Love radio station in New Hope–Huntsville, Alabama

New Hope, Alabama; United States
- Broadcast area: Huntsville, Alabama
- Frequency: 103.5 MHz (HD Radio)

Programming
- Format: Christian Contemporary
- Subchannels: HD2: Air1 (Contemporary worship music); HD3: American Family Radio (Conservative religious talk)
- Network: K-LOVE

Ownership
- Owner: Educational Media Foundation

History
- Former call signs: WHWT (2007–2014)
- Call sign meaning: "Huntsville's K-Love"

Technical information
- Licensing authority: FCC
- Facility ID: 170944
- Class: A
- ERP: 900 watts
- HAAT: 463 meters (1,519 ft)
- Transmitter coordinates: 34°38′11″N 86°30′42″W
- Translators: HD2: 92.9 W225AH (Huntsville); HD3: 93.7 W229BL (Huntsville)

Links
- Public license information: Public file; LMS
- Webcast: Listen Live; Listen Live (HD2); Listen Live (HD3)
- Website: klove.com air1.com (HD2) afr.net (HD3)

WHVK (103.5 FM) is a radio station repeating a satellite-delivered Contemporary Christian music format branded as K-LOVE, and is licensed to New Hope, Alabama. The station serves the Huntsville, Alabama, area. WHVK is owned and operated by Educational Media Foundation.

The WHVK transmitter is located on the old WZDX-TV tower on Green Mountain.

== History ==
This station was granted its original construction permit by the Federal Communications Commission (FCC) on May 18, 2007. The new station was assigned the WHWT call letters by the FCC on November 7, 2007. WHWT officially went on the air on December 2, 2007. The station received its license to cover from the FCC on January 22, 2008.

On March 3, 2008, the FCC approved the reassignment of the station's broadcast license from Stroh Communications Corp. to Stroh Comm LLC. As of April 5, 2009, the FCC does not show this transaction as having been consummated and Stroh Communications Corp. was still listed as the station's licensee in the FCC database.

It was announced on December 6, 2013, that Educational Media Foundation would purchase WHWT from Stroh Communications for $850,000. The sale of the station was finalized by the FCC on March 20, 2014, as EMF took full control of the station. The station temporarily signed off before switching to the non-commercial status, and started broadcasting a satellite feed of its owned & operated Christian Contemporary music station known as K-LOVE, permanently at midnight on March 25, 2014. After WHWT switched its format, the displaced management and staff of WHWT took to Twitter to blame the businesses for not supporting the station since its 2008 launch.

The station changed to the current WHVK call sign on March 20, 2014.

The American Family Radio feed appears to be active as of mid-July 2016, but on the HD-3, while the HD-2 launched as Air1 a few weeks later in early September. The higher power facility went on the air in the late summer of 2016; shortly after, the station received another permit to add another hundred or so watts to the total power level, and that went on the air in November 2016.

== Former programming ==
Previously before switching to the current Contemporary Christian music format, the station's musical direction focused entirely on R&B/Hip-Hop hits. WHWT was listed in Mediabase as a Rhythmic reporter because of its inclusion of Rhythmic Pop hits.

Previous on-air staff included Jordan Marie during middays, former program director and afternoon host DJ Fresh and DJ Tony Tone at night. Notable syndicated programming included The Steve Harvey Morning Show morning show, airing Monday through Saturday, BET's Top 20 countdown hosted by Terrence J and Roscsi on Sundays, The Aphilliates Mixtape Mondays featuring DJ Drama, Don Cannon and DJ Sense on Monday nights, and former evening host Shady Nation.
