= KNLF =

- Quincy, California; United States
- Broadcast area: Sierra Nevada
- Frequency: 95.9 MHz

Programming
- Format: Contemporary Christian
- Affiliations: AFR

Ownership
- Owner: New Life Broadcasting

History
- First air date: 1984

Technical information
- Licensing authority: FCC
- Facility ID: 48496
- Class: A
- ERP: 1,000 watts
- HAAT: −339.0 meters (−1,112.2 ft)
- Transmitter coordinates: 39°56′15″N 120°56′44″W

Links
- Public license information: Public file; LMS
- Website: chamberorganizer.com/quincychamber/mem_knlf

KNLF (95.9 FM) is a radio station broadcasting a Contemporary Christian format licensed to Quincy, California, United States, and serving the surrounding Sierra Nevada area.

The station is currently owned by New Life Broadcasting. The stations airs AFR on Monday-Friday at 12:30pm-2pm, 3pm-5pm, and 5:30pm–8:00 am.
