= KIKL =

Coordinates: 30.284722°N 92.067500°W

Lafayette, Louisiana; United States
- Broadcast area: Lafayette metropolitan area
- Frequency: 90.9 MHz

Programming
- Format: Christian contemporary
- Network: K-Love

Ownership
- Owner: Educational Media Foundation

History
- First air date: February 7, 1988
- Former call signs: KSJY (1988–2005); KAQE (2005)

Technical information
- Licensing authority: FCC
- Facility ID: 36225
- Class: C3
- ERP: 8,200 watts
- HAAT: 115 meters (377 ft)

Links
- Public license information: Public file; LMS
- Webcast: Listen live
- Website: http://www.klove.com/

KIKL (90.9 MHz) is a Christian contemporary station licensed to Lafayette, Louisiana. It is owned by Educational Media Foundation and airs its K-Love network.

== History ==
The station began broadcasting February 7, 1988, and held the call sign KSJY. It was owned by Lafayette Educational Broadcasting Foundation and aired a religious format. The station at the time was locally programmed and operated from a studio in Scott. In 1997, the station was sold to American Family Association for $175,000, and it became an affiliate of American Family Radio.

In 2005, the station was sold to Educational Media Foundation for $1.5 million. On March 29, 2005, its call sign was changed to KAQE and on April 6, 2005, its call sign was changed to KIKL. The station became an affiliate of K-Love.
