= XHCH-FM =

Radio station in Toluca, State of Mexico, Mexico

Toluca, State of Mexico; Mexico
- Frequency: 89.3 FM
- Branding: Lokura FM Rock

Programming
- Format: Rock

Ownership
- Owner: CapitalMedia; (Radiodifusoras Capital, S.A. de C.V.)

History
- First air date: September 14, 1938 (concession); November 6, 2017 (FM)
- Former call signs: XECH-AM (1938–2019)
- Former frequencies: 1490 kHz (1938–1996); 1040 kHz (1996–2019)

Technical information
- Class: A
- ERP: 3 kW
- HAAT: 21.2 m
- Transmitter coordinates: 19°17′22″N 99°39′12.6″W

Links
- Webcast: Listen live
- Website: lokurafm.com/toluca

XHCH-FM is a radio station on 89.3 FM in Toluca, State of Mexico, Mexico. XHCH-FM is owned by Capital Media and is known as Lokura FM with a rock format.

== History ==
Final "Radio Capital" logo before AM-FM migration

XECH-AM received its concession on September 14, 1938, having gone on the air in either 1937 or 1938. The station, the first in the State of Mexico, operated on 1490 kHz and was owned by Rodolfo Llamas. XECH was Toluca's only local radio station for more than 25 years until XEQY-AM 1200 "Radio Fiesta" signed on in 1965. Llamas sold XECH to Ramón Cahero Padrón in 1956; Cahero Padrón sold it to Emma Ruíz de Azcue in 1963. Osvelia Irene and Oscar Azcue Ruíz became the concessionaires in 1996 after Emma's death, and they promptly sold the station to Grupo ACIR. ACIR only owned the station for a year before selling to Capital. It also moved from 1490 to 1040 kHz in order to increase daytime power to 5 kW from its previous 1; it broadcast at night with 750 watts.

On November 6, 2017, XHCH-FM 89.3 signed on as the first in a wave of new AM-FM migrants in large cities in Mexico, made possible by the reduction in mandatory station spacing from 800 to 400 kHz. At the same time, the station dumped its Radio Capital talk format to take on Capital Pirata FM, the first new station in four years with this format and the first outside of the original Gaia FM stations. Governor Alfredo del Mazo Maza conducted a formal inauguration of the station on November 10. However, the station was officially reported to have begun operations on June 14, 2018—which meant the station's required year of simulcasting concluded on June 14, 2019.

The Pirata FM format was retooled in August 2019 to move away from rock and toward a more English-language contemporary selection. A new logo and slogan, Hits Todo el Día (Hits All Day), were adopted at this time. On June 8, 2020, XHCH was one of seven stations to debut the new Lokura FM adult hits brand. Lokura FM was split into rock, adult hits, and grupera brands in 2023, with the rock format being installed at XHCH.
