= WLXZ =

- Pinehurst, North Carolina; United States
- Frequency: 90.3 MHz
- Branding: K-Love

Programming
- Format: Contemporary Christian
- Affiliations: K-Love

Ownership
- Owner: Educational Media Foundation

History
- First air date: 2002
- Former call signs: WBFY (2002–2016)

Technical information
- Licensing authority: FCC
- Class: A
- ERP: 3,500 Watts
- HAAT: 100 meters (330 ft)
- Transmitter coordinates: 35°09′13″N 79°34′16″W

Links
- Public license information: Public file; LMS
- Website: http://www.klove.com

WLXZ (90.3 FM) is a radio station broadcasting a Religious format. Licensed to Pinehurst, North Carolina, United States, the station is currently owned by Educational Media Foundation (EMF), and broadcasts EMF's K-Love contemporary Christian programming.

The station was first licensed in 2002, and held the call sign WBFY. It was owned by the American Family Association and was an affiliate of American Family Radio. In 2016, the station was traded to Educational Media Foundation, and it became an affiliate of K-Love. On July 15, 2016, its call sign was changed to WLXZ.
