= XHKW-FM =

Radio station in Morelia, Michoacán, Mexico

- Morelia, Michoacán; Mexico
- Frequency: 89.3 FM
- Branding: Exa FM

Programming
- Format: Pop
- Affiliations: MVS Radio

Ownership
- Owner: Grupo CB; (Corporación Morelia Multimedia, S.A. de C.V.)

History
- First air date: September 22, 1939 (concession)
- Former call signs: XESF-AM (1939-19??); XEKW-AM (19??–2011)

Technical information
- ERP: 25 kW
- Transmitter coordinates: 19°41′19″N 101°10′53″W

Links
- Webcast: Listen live
- Website: exafm.com

XHKW-FM is a radio station on 89.3 FM in Morelia, Michoacán, Mexico.

== History ==
XESF-AM 1300 received its concession on September 22, 1939, as a longwave station. It was owned by José Martínez Ramírez until 1968, when it was sold to Francisco Rivanedeyra Hinojosa. Around 1955, XESF-AM had a relay station, XEKW-AM. In the 1980s, ownership of XEKW was transferred to Grupo ACIR. ACIR shed the station in 2008, selling it to Corporación Morelia Multimedia, a subsidiary of Multimundo, which is owned by Emilio Nassar Rodríguez and Jaime Robledo Castellanos. In July 2013, it became part of CB Televisión.

XEKW was cleared to move to FM in 2011, reusing XHMRL-FM old callsign. Despite being in the same city as XHKW-TDT, it had not been commonly owned with the TV station since 1968.
