= WWGN =

Coordinates: 41°18′05″N 88°57′11″W

- Ottawa, Illinois; United States
- Broadcast area: LaSalle, Illinois; Peru, Illinois; Ottawa, Illinois; Streator, Illinois
- Frequency: 88.9 MHz
- Branding: "SONLIFE Radio Network"

Programming
- Format: Religious
- Affiliations: SONLIFE Radio Network

Ownership
- Owner: Family Worship Center Church, Inc.

History
- First air date: September 24, 1994

Technical information
- Licensing authority: FCC
- Facility ID: 13926
- Class: B1
- ERP: 4,100 watts vertical 1,400 watts horizontal
- HAAT: 148.4 meters (487 ft)

Links
- Public license information: Public file; LMS
- Webcast: Listen live
- Website: http://sonlifetv.com/

WWGN is a religious formatted radio station broadcasting on 88.9 FM. The station is licensed to Ottawa, Illinois, and serving the areas of LaSalle, Illinois, Peru, Illinois, Ottawa, Illinois, and Streator, Illinois. WWGN is owned and operated by Family Worship Center Church, Inc.

== History ==
The station began broadcasting on September 24, 1994, and was owned by Cornerstone Community Radio, airing a religious format. In 1999, the station was sold to American Family Association for $250,000, and it became an affiliate of American Family Radio. In 2004, the station was sold to Family Worship Center Church, along with WAWF and WBMF, for $1 million.
