= XHZX-FM =

Radio station in Tenosique, Tabasco, Mexico

- Tenosique, Tabasco; Mexico
- Frequency: 89.3 FM
- Branding: ZX Radio

Programming
- Format: Full-service radio

Ownership
- Owner: XEZX, Voz del Usumacinta, S.A. de C.V.

History
- First air date: September 30, 1964 (concession)

Technical information
- Class: AA
- ERP: 6 kW
- Transmitter coordinates: 17°35′34″N 91°30′04″W

XHZX-FM is a radio station on 89.3 FM in Tenosique, Tabasco, Mexico, known as ZX Radio.

== History ==
XEZX-AM received its concession on September 30, 1964. It was owned by María de Lourdes Torres Garza and operated with 1,000 watts on 1240 kHz. By the end of the 1960s, XEZX had moved to 860 kHz.

From February 6, 2009, to 2011, XEZX was off the air due to a strike by unionized workers.

XEZX was cleared to migrate to FM in 2010 as XHZX-FM 89.3. When XEZX returned to the air after the strike, from new facilities, XHZX signed on for the first time.
