= XHART-FM =

Radio station in Zacatepec and Jojutla, Morelos, Mexico

XEART-AM
- Zacatepec, Morelos; Mexico
- Broadcast area: Jojutla, Morelos
- Frequency: 89.3 MHz
- Branding: Radio Señal

Programming
- Format: Regional Mexican

Ownership
- Owner: Araceli Rojas Tenorio

History
- First air date: November 13, 1983
- Call sign meaning: Araceli Rojas Tenorio

Technical information
- ERP: 3 kW
- HAAT: 16.5 meters
- Transmitter coordinates: 18°40′00″N 99°11′40″W

Links
- Webcast: Listen live
- Website: XHART-FM on Facebook

XHART-FM is a radio station in Zacatepec, Morelos, licensed to Jojutla. It broadcasts on 89.3 FM and is owned by Araceli Rojas Tenorio, and carries a Regional Mexican format known as Radio Señal.

== History ==
After 20 years of applying for the station, XEART-AM 1590 (later moved to 1520) received its concession on October 30, 1981, and signed on two weeks later, on November 13. Most of the history of this station revolves around the marriage of Andrés Eloy Martínez Silva and Araceli Rojas Tenorio. Rojas Tenorio was a pioneering female politician in Morelos; she is the mother of Andrés Eloy Martínez, a representative in the 62nd Chamber of Deputies for the state of Morelos.

On October 31, 1998, XEART broadcast a dramatization of The War of the Worlds by H.G. Wells; this resulted in panic on behalf of the audience, which believed it was an actual event, despite warnings before the program.

In 2011, it migrated to FM as XHART-FM on 89.3.

The 2017 Puebla earthquake caused heavy damage to the station's studios in the Plaza Yuliana in Jojutla; the station was relocated to Zacatepec after the event.
