= WALI =

Radio station in Dayton–Cleveland, Tennessee, United States

- Dayton, Tennessee; United States
- Broadcast area: Rhea County, Tennessee; Cleveland, Tennessee
- Frequency: 1280 kHz
- Branding: Alive 96.9

Programming
- Language: English
- Format: Soft adult contemporary

Ownership
- Owner: Beverly Broadcasting Company, LLC
- Sister stations: WDNT, WRKQ

History
- First air date: December 6, 1957
- Former call signs: WDNT (1957–2006); WALV (2/2006); WDNT (2006–2019); WRHA (6/2019–9/2019)
- Call sign meaning: Alive

Technical information
- Licensing authority: FCC
- Facility ID: 70783
- Class: D
- Power: 1,000 watts day; 310 watts night
- Transmitter coordinates: 35°28′12″N 85°02′15″W
- Translator: 96.9 W245DZ (Cleveland)

Links
- Public license information: Public file; LMS
- Webcast: Listen Live
- Website: www.alive969.com

WALI (1280 AM) is an American radio station licensed to serve the community of Dayton, the county seat of Rhea County, Tennessee. Established in 1957, the station's broadcast license is held by Beverly Broadcasting Company, LLC. The station broadcasts a soft adult contemporary format and is known as "Alive 96.9, Cleveland's Lite Rock", named for its FM translator, W245DZ 96.9 FM, which has its transmitter in Cleveland, Tennessee.

== FM translator ==
In addition to the AM frequency of 1280 kHz, WALI programming is relayed to an FM translator. The FM frequency also provides the listener with high fidelity sound and the ability to listen on the FM band. The FM signal is used as the frequency on the station logo and branding. However, the translator does not cover Dayton.

Broadcast translator for WALI
Call sign	Frequency	City of license	FID	ERP (W)	HAAT	Class	FCC info
W245DZ	96.9 FM	Cleveland, Tennessee	138251	250	99 m (325 ft)	D	LMS

== History ==
=== Early days ===
This station began regular broadcast operations on December 6, 1957, as WDNT, with 1,000 watts of power on a frequency of 1280 kilohertz as a "daytimer", restricted to broadcasting between sunrise and sunset to limit skywave interference with other stations on the same frequency. WDNT was the first radio station licensed by the Federal Communications Commission (FCC) to serve Dayton.

Launched under the ownership of Norman A. Thomas with the broadcast license held by the Dayton Broadcasting Company, the station's original personnel included general manager Jack S. Pullin, chief engineer Eddie Lane, news director Bill Watts, farm director E.L. Tipps, and women's issues director Lois Massengill. WDNT was an affiliate of the Keystone Network.

The station maintained this affiliation through the 1970s and broadcast a full service country music format to Dayton, Tennessee, and surrounding Rhea County. On July 1, 1976, WDNT added FM sister station "WNFM" (104.9 FM) which aired a middle of the road music format. The FM station is now separately owned and licensed as "WUIE" (105.1 FM).

=== 1980s ===
WDNT owner Norman A. Thomas died in April 1980 at the age of 79. Norman A. Thomas Jr., acting as executor of his father's estate, notified the FCC of the involuntary transfer of control of the license holder from father to son. The FCC approved the transfer on June 6, 1980.

In September 1982, WDNT Broadcasting, Inc., reached an agreement to sell the station to Eaton P. Govan III. The FCC approved the deal on November 3, 1982, but formal consummation of the transaction was delayed until May 8, 1986. Govan's turn as station owner was short-lived, as in November 1986, he agreed to sell WDNT to the partnership of George R. Johnson and George Lewis Wyatt, doing business as Dayton Broadcasting Company. The FCC approved the sale on December 30, 1986, and the transaction was formally consummated on January 8, 1987.

=== 1990s ===
In December 1990, George Lewis Wyatt transferred his interest in Dayton Broadcasting Company to partner George R. Johnson, leaving Johnson as the sole license holder for WDNT. The FCC approved the transfer on January 8, 1991, and the deal was formally consummated on February 25, 1991.

George R. Johnson, doing business as Dayton Broadcasting Company, contracted to sell WDNT and its assets to Walter E. Hooper III in October 1993. After lengthy deliberation, the FCC approved the sale on September 20, 1994, and the transaction was formally consummated on February 7, 1995.

=== 2000s ===
In March 2002, station owner Walter E. Hooper III reached an agreement to sell WDNT to Chattanooga-based Brewer Broadcasting through its subsidiary, J.L. Brewer Broadcasting of Cleveland, LLC. The FCC approved the sale on May 20, 2002, and the deal was formally consummated on July 1, 2002.

Because the land where the station's broadcast tower was located was sold to another party in a separate transaction, the station applied to the FCC for a construction permit to relocate its transmitter to a nearby site in November 2002. The FCC granted the permit on February 19, 2003, with a scheduled expiration date of February 19, 2006. Construction and testing were completed in December 2003, so the station applied for a new broadcast license to cover these changes. The FCC issued the new license on October 17, 2004.

After nearly 50 years of continuous operation as "WDNT", the new owners had the station's call sign changed to "WALV" on February 2, 2006, as part of a complicated call sign shuffle among Brewer Broadcasting radio stations. The change was very short-lived as the station was reassigned the "WDNT" call sign by the FCC on February 26, 2006.

In December 2007, Brewer Broadcasting agreed to sell WDNT to Whitfield Communications through a subsidiary known as East Tennessee Radio Group III, L.P. The sale was part of a four station deal valued at $1,865,000 for the stations' broadcast licenses plus an additional $835,000 for the real estate including studio buildings, station offices, and the WDNT transmitter tower location for a total price of $2.7 million. The three sister stations in the deal were WBAC (1340 AM, Cleveland, Tennessee); WXQK (970 AM, Spring City, Tennessee); and WAYA (93.9 FM, Spring City, Tennessee). The FCC approved the group sale on January 31, 2008, and the deal was formally consummated on May 30, 2008.

At the time of the sale, all three of the AM stations were simulcasting a news/talk radio format from studios in Cleveland, Tennessee. Programming included a local morning show plus syndicated conservative talk hosts including Rush Limbaugh and Sean Hannity. The only time during the week that the stations did not share a program stream was on Sunday mornings when each broadcast a different local church service. While the sale was pending, Whitfield Communications began operating the station group under a local marketing agreement on December 1, 2007. On January 12, 2008, WDNT and its sister stations became part-time affiliates of the Fox Sports Radio network, airing sports programming from midnight to 6 a.m. and 6 p.m. to midnight each weekday plus additional programming on Saturday and Sunday.

=== Sale to Beverly Broadcasting ===
In November 2009, Whitfield Communications spun off the two Rhea County-based AM stations (WDNT and WXQK) to Beverly Broadcasting Company, LLC, for just $27,000. (This is only 1% of the $2.7 million price the four-station group and real estate combo had fetched less than two years earlier.) Beverly Broadcasting Company is owned by the husband-and-wife team of Mike and Sue Beverly, then based in Knoxville, Tennessee. The FCC approved the sale on December 31, 2009, and the deal was formally consummated on January 14, 2010.

However, while the Beverlys acquired the radio stations, they did not acquire the land on which the WDNT transmitter and broadcast antenna were located, as that land was sold to a third party. For this reason, WDNT went dark on November 13, 2009, while the search for a new transmitter site was underway. On December 30, 2009, the FCC granted the station special temporary authority to remain silent until June 28, 2010.

WDNT returned to the air on June 6, 2010, with an oldies music format, using a temporary facility at the original WDNT broadcast tower site. In June 2011, the station applied to the FCC for a new construction permit for a permanent tower site nearby. The FCC granted the permit on November 16, 2011, with a scheduled expiration date on November 16, 2014. For most of the 2010s, WRHA broadcast an oldies music format similar to, but not always in simulcast with, sister station WDNT (970 AM, Spring City, Tennessee). While the stations were mostly locally programmed and operated, in August 2011 both stations began airing the syndicated radio program The Donny Osmond Show for five hours each weekday.

In addition to music programming, WRHA and WDNT would broadcast Rhea County High School football games each fall.

=== Alive 97 ===
On June 17, 2019, WDNT swapped call signs with sister station WRHA. 1280 AM retained the WRHA call letters until changing to WALI on September 25, 2019. Beverly relaunched the station as "Alive 97" in October 2019. The station promotes itself as "Cleveland's Lite Rock" and is seeking to court listeners in that city, where the translator is located.

The station is branded as "Continuous Lite Rock from the 1980s, '90s and more all day, plus Love Songs At Night". The name of the station is an homage to WUIE, which was formerly located in Cleveland and known as "Alive 105" at the time.
