= XHFF-FM =

Radio station in Matehuala, San Luis Potosí, Mexico

- Matehuala, San Luis Potosí; Mexico
- Frequency: 89.3 FM
- Branding: La Norteña

Programming
- Format: Regional Mexican

Ownership
- Owner: Boone Menchaca family; (Radio XHFF, S.A. de C.V.)

History
- First air date: January 15, 1953 (concession)

Technical information
- Licensing authority: CRT
- Class: B1
- ERP: 25 kW
- HAAT: 8.07 m (26.5 ft)
- Transmitter coordinates: 23°38′41″N 100°38′26″W

XHFF-FM is a radio station on 89.3 FM in Matehuala, San Luis Potosí. It carries a Regional Mexican format known as La Norteña.

== History ==
XEFF-AM 1490 received its concession on January 15, 1953. It was owned by Arcelia Montemayor de Hernández and sold to Ricardo Boone Menchaca in the 1960s. It was moved to 980 in the 2000s and was later authorized to migrate to FM in 2011.
