= WLSF =

Coordinates: 30.284722°N 92.067500°W

- Starke, Florida; United States
- Broadcast area: Gainesville, Florida
- Frequency: 88.3 MHz

Programming
- Format: Christian contemporary
- Network: K-Love

Ownership
- Owner: Educational Media Foundation

History
- First air date: 1982
- Former call signs: WTLG (1982–2016); WCKL-FM (2016–2018); WLUP-FM (2018)

Technical information
- Licensing authority: FCC
- Facility ID: 62344
- Class: C3
- ERP: 7,000 watts
- HAAT: 87 meters (285 ft)

Links
- Public license information: Public file; LMS
- Webcast: Listen live
- Website: http://www.klove.com/

WLSF (88.3 MHz) is a Christian contemporary station licensed to Starke, Florida. It is owned by Educational Media Foundation and is an affiliate of K-Love.

== History ==
The station began broadcasting in 1982, and held the call sign WTLG. It was owned by Starke Christian Education Radio & TV and aired a southern gospel format. In 2008, the station was sold to American Family Association for $225,000, and it became an affiliate of American Family Radio.

In 2014, American Family Association traded WTLG and KNDW in Williston, North Dakota to Educational Media Foundation, in exchange for WVDA in Valdosta, Georgia. WTLG became an affiliate of K-Love. On December 15, 2014, the station's call sign was changed to WCKL-FM. On March 12, 2018, its call sign was briefly changed to WLUP-FM, after swapping call signs with 97.9 in Chicago. On March 19, 2018, its call sign was changed to WLSF.
