= KPRG =

Public radio station in Hagåtña, Guam

- Hagåtña; Guam
- Broadcast area: Guam
- Frequency: 89.3 MHz
- Branding: KPRG 89.3

Programming
- Languages: English, Chamorro
- Format: Public radio

Ownership
- Owner: Guam Educational Radio Foundation

History
- First air date: January 27, 1994
- Call sign meaning: Public Radio Guam

Technical information
- Licensing authority: FCC
- Class: C3
- ERP: 9,200 watts
- HAAT: 162 meters
- Transmitter coordinates: 13.488056°N 144.831389°E
- Translator: 89.3 K207FH (Saipan)

Links
- Public license information: Public file; LMS

KPRG (89.3 FM) is a public radio station owned and operated by the Guam Educational Radio Foundation. Licensed to Hagåtña, the island's only public radio station is a member of NPR, APM, PRI and BBC. Its studios are located inside house number 13, Dean's Circle, University of Guam campus, Mangilao.
