= WQPH =

- Shirley, Massachusetts; United States
- Broadcast area: Fitchburg, Massachusetts
- Frequency: 89.3 MHz
- Branding: 89.3 WQPH

Programming
- Format: Catholic radio
- Affiliations: EWTN Radio

Ownership
- Owner: Prayers for Life, Inc.

History
- First air date: November 2012
- Call sign meaning: "Queen of Perpetual Help"

Technical information
- Licensing authority: FCC
- Facility ID: 176678
- Class: A
- ERP: 580 watts
- HAAT: 16.9 meters (55 ft)
- Transmitter coordinates: 42°33′10.7″N 71°47′49.7″W

Links
- Public license information: Public file; LMS
- Webcast: Listen live
- Website: www.wqphradio.org

WQPH (89.3 FM) is a Catholic radio station, licensed to Shirley, Massachusetts, United States and serving the Fitchburg area. The station is owned by Prayers for Life, Inc., and is an affiliate of EWTN Radio.
