= American Family Radio =

American Christian radio network

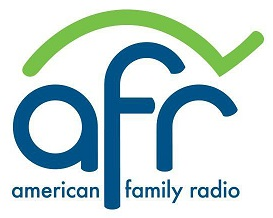
- Type: Radio network
- Country: United States

Ownership
- Owner: American Family Association

Links
- Webcast: AFR Talk; AFR Music; AFR Hybrid
- Website: afr.net

American Family Radio (AFR), also known as American Family News (AFN), is a network of more than 180 radio stations broadcasting Christian-oriented programming to over 30 states. AFR streams its programming on its website and the AFR mobile app.

== Summary ==
American Family Radio is split among two networks – AFR Talk, which airs Christian talk and teaching; and AFR Hybrid, airing Christian talk and contemporary Christian music.

AFR airs original programs such as Today's Issues, hosted by AFA president Tim Wildmon. AFR also airs nationally syndicated programs such as Focus on the Family, as well as contemporary Christian music by various artists. Other personalities heard on AFR include Dr. James Dobson, Dr. Robert Jeffress, David Barton, Jan Markell and Sandy Rios.

== History ==
AFR was launched by Rev. Donald Wildmon in 1991 as a ministry of the American Family Association, with the flagship station being WAFR in Tupelo, Mississippi. It originally aired a contemporary Christian music format. Christian talk and teaching programs were also featured. Eventually, American Family Radio included three networks – Classic Gospel; a Christian AC network; and Inspirational, which included Christian talk and teaching programs. In 2009, American Family Radio launched AFR Talk, and most of its stations joined the new network. The Christian AC network was discontinued at this time. At its peak, American Family Radio was heard on over 200 stations.

== Station list ==
=== Owned and operated ===
Call sign	Frequency	State	City of license	ERP W	Height m (ft)	Network
WALN	89.3 FM	AL	Carrollton	9,500	213 m (699 ft)	AFR Hybrid
W229BL	93.7 FM	AL	Huntsville	78	32 m (105 ft)	AFR Talk
W224CR	92.7 FM	AL	Montgomery	74	90 m (300 ft)	AFR Talk
W203DJ	88.5 FM	AL	Rainbow Mountain	10	156.9 m (515 ft)	AFR Talk
WAQU	91.1 FM	AL	Selma	21,500	102 m (335 ft)	AFR Talk
WAKD	89.9 FM	AL	Sheffield	7,400	72 m (236 ft)	AFR Talk
WAXU	91.1 FM	AL	Troy	1,100	75 m (246 ft)	AFR Talk
KAWN	91.3 FM	AZ	Winslow	300	36 m (118 ft)	AFR Talk
KBCM	88.3 FM	AR	Blytheville	1,200	58 m (190 ft)	AFR Hybrid
KEJA	91.7 FM	AR	Cale	3,000	136 m (446 ft)	AFR Hybrid
K210BN	89.9 FM	AR	Clarksville	250	69 m (226 ft)	AFR Hybrid
K219BZ	91.7 FM	AR	Crossett	250	54 m (177 ft)	AFR Talk
KBDO	91.7 FM	AR	Des Arc	56,000	208 m (682 ft)	AFR Talk
KBNV	90.1 FM	AR	Fayetteville	16,000 (vertical); 7,100 (horizontal)	142 m (466 ft)	AFR Talk
KBPW	88.1 FM	AR	Hampton	60,000	103 m (338 ft)	AFR Talk
KBMJ	89.5 FM	AR	Heber Springs	70,000	224 m (735 ft)	AFR Hybrid
KAOG	90.5 FM	AR	Jonesboro	40,000	121 m (397 ft)	AFR Hybrid
KJSB	88.3 FM	AR	Jonesboro	1,900	91 m (299 ft)	AFR Talk
KNLL	90.5 FM	AR	Nashville	100,000	146.5 m (481 ft)	AFR Talk
K211BX	90.1 FM	AR	Pocahontas	170	100 m (330 ft)	AFR Talk
KANX	91.1 FM	AR	Sheridan	40,000	159 m (522 ft)	AFR Hybrid
K217BW	91.3 FM	AR	Warren	250	69 m (226 ft)	AFR Hybrid
W270CD	101.9 FM	FL	Jacksonville Beach	120	255 m (837 ft)	AFR Talk
WKTZ	1220 AM	FL	Jacksonville	1,000 day 36 night		AFR Talk
WBJY	89.3 FM	GA	Americus	65,000	187 m (614 ft)	AFR Hybrid
WAEF	90.3 FM	GA	Cordele	11,000	154 m (505 ft)	AFR Talk
WAWH	88.3 FM	GA	Dublin	400	25 m (82 ft)	AFR Talk
WBKG	88.9 FM	GA	Macon	5,500	153 m (502 ft)	AFR Talk
WVDA	88.5 FM	GA	Valdosta	18,500	66 m (217 ft)	AFR Talk
WASW	91.9 FM	GA	Waycross	18,000	88 m (289 ft)	AFR Hybrid
WBEL-FM	88.5 FM	IL	Cairo	64,000	170 m (560 ft)	AFR Hybrid
WEFI	89.5 FM	IL	Effingham	400	50 m (160 ft)	AFR Talk
WAXR	88.1 FM	IL	Geneseo	3,000	98 m (322 ft)	AFR Talk
WAWJ	90.1 FM	IL	Marion	3,000	105 m (344 ft)	AFR Hybrid
WAPO	90.5 FM	IL	Mount Vernon	1,100	62 m (203 ft)	AFR Talk
WSLE	91.3 FM	IL	Salem	770	47 m (154 ft)	AFR Talk
WQSG	90.7 FM	IN	Lafayette	17,000	100 m (330 ft)	AFR Talk
W204CS	88.7 FM	IN	Michigan City	13	40 m (130 ft)	AFR Talk
WATI	89.9 FM	IN	Vincennes	500	48 m (157 ft)	AFR Talk
KAYP	89.9 FM	IA	Burlington	9,000	134 m (440 ft)	AFR Hybrid
KIAD	88.5 FM	IA	Dubuque	750	158 m (518 ft)	AFR Hybrid
KBDC	88.5 FM	IA	Mason City	68,000	141 m (463 ft)	AFR Hybrid
KWVI	88.9 FM	IA	Waverly	20,000	83.5 m (274 ft)	AFR Hybrid
KAXR	91.3 FM	KS	Arkansas City	9,300	98 m (322 ft)	AFR Talk
K201JF	88.1 FM	KS	Beloit	250	37 m (121 ft)	AFR Talk
KBJQ	88.3 FM	KS	Bronson	36,000	116 m (381 ft)	AFR Hybrid
KBDA	89.7 FM	KS	Great Bend	1,400	34 m (112 ft)	AFR Talk
KHYS	89.7 FM	KS	Hays	450	87 m (285 ft)	AFR Hybrid
KBQC	88.5 FM	KS	Independence	20,000	145 m (476 ft)	AFR Talk
KMLL	91.7 FM	KS	Marysville	600	87 m (285 ft)	AFR Hybrid
KRBW	90.5 FM	KS	Ottawa	430	57 m (187 ft)	AFR Hybrid
KAKA	88.5 FM	KS	Salina	46,000	120 m (390 ft)	AFR Hybrid
KBUZ	90.3 FM	KS	Topeka	11,000	256 m (840 ft)	AFR Hybrid
KCFN	91.1 FM	KS	Wichita	100,000	148 m (486 ft)	AFR Hybrid
WAPD	91.7 FM	KY	Campbellsville	2,323	66 m (217 ft)	AFR Hybrid
WBMK	88.5 FM	KY	Morehead	600	159 m (522 ft)	AFR Talk
WAXG	88.1 FM	KY	Mount Sterling	300	53 m (174 ft)	AFR Talk
WGCF	89.3 FM	KY	Paducah	12,000	150 m (490 ft)	AFR Talk
W243DG	96.5 FM	KY	Winchester	82	151 m (495 ft)	AFR Talk
KAPM	91.7 FM	LA	Alexandria	1,000	39 m (128 ft)	AFR Hybrid
KAXV	91.9 FM	LA	Bastrop	12,000	139 m (456 ft)	AFR Hybrid
KMRL	91.9 FM	LA	Buras	11,500	240 m (790 ft)	AFR Talk
KBAN	91.5 FM	LA	De Ridder	20,500	110 m (360 ft)	AFR Talk
KYLC	90.3 FM	LA	Lake Charles	80,000	143 m (469 ft)	AFR Hybrid
KMSL	91.7 FM	LA	Mansfield	12,000	103.4 m (339 ft)	AFR Talk
KAVK	89.3 FM	LA	Many	12,000	130 m (430 ft)	AFR Hybrid
KPAQ	88.1 FM	LA	Plaquemine	90,000	91 m (299 ft)	AFR Talk
KAPI	88.3 FM	LA	Ruston	300	60 m (200 ft)	AFR Hybrid
KSJY	89.9 FM	LA	St. Martinville	30,000	142 m (466 ft)	AFR Talk
WAIJ	90.3 FM	MD	Grantsville	8,800 (vertical); 10,000 (horizontal)	171 m (561 ft)	AFR Talk
WMCQ	91.7 FM	MI	Muskegon	6,000	100 m (330 ft)	AFR Talk
WMSB	88.9 FM	MS	Byhalia	52,000	145 m (476 ft)	AFR Talk
WPRG	89.5 FM	MS	Columbia	250	63 m (207 ft)	AFR Talk
WCSO	90.5 FM	MS	Columbus	10,000	161.5 m (530 ft)	AFR Talk
WSQH	91.7 FM	MS	Decatur	18,000	145 m (476 ft)	AFR Talk
WAUM	91.9 FM	MS	Duck Hill	2,500	156 m (512 ft)	AFR Talk
WQST-FM	92.5 FM	MS	Forest	97,000	302 m (991 ft)	AFR Hybrid
WAOY	91.7 FM	MS	Gulfport	78,000	332 m (1,089 ft)	AFR Hybrid
WAII	89.3 FM	MS	Hattiesburg	1,000	82 m (269 ft)	AFR Talk
WYTF	88.7 FM	MS	Indianola	100,000	194 m (636 ft)	AFR Hybrid
WATP	90.9 FM	MS	Laurel	69,000	220.5 m (723 ft)	AFR Talk
WQVI	90.5 FM	MS	Madison	60,000	131 m (430 ft)	AFR Talk
WAQL	90.5 FM	MS	McComb	30,000	162.8 m (534 ft)	AFR Hybrid
WASM	91.1 FM	MS	Natchez	1,000	58.9 m (193 ft)	AFR Hybrid
WAVI	91.5 FM	MS	Oxford	8,130	175 m (574 ft)	AFR Hybrid
WPAS	89.1 FM	MS	Pascagoula	60,000	175 m (574 ft)	AFR Talk
WATU	89.3 FM	MS	Port Gibson	24,500	117 m (384 ft)	AFR Hybrid
WJZB	88.7 FM	MS	Starkville	1,000	74 m (243 ft)	AFR Hybrid
WAFR	88.3 FM	MS	Tupelo	75,000	150 m (490 ft)	AFR Hybrid
WAJS	91.7 FM	MS	Tupelo	23,000	154 m (505 ft)	AFR Talk
WAQB	90.9 FM	MS	Tupelo	35,000	130 m (430 ft)	AFR Talk
WYAZ	89.5 FM	MS	Yazoo City	85,000	162 m (531 ft)	AFR Talk
KAUF	89.9 FM	MO	Kennett	1,000	50 m (160 ft)	AFR Talk
KBGM	91.1 FM	MO	Park Hills	8,000	189 m (620 ft)	AFR Talk
KAFH	91.5 FM	MT	Great Falls	1,000	90.7 m (298 ft)	AFR Talk
KAYA	91.3 FM	NE	Hubbard	5,100	115 m (377 ft)	AFR Talk
KAQF	91.1 FM	NM	Clovis	450	94 m (308 ft)	AFR Hybrid
KOBH	91.7 FM	NM	Hobbs	250	47 m (154 ft)	AFR Talk
K212GD	90.3 FM	NM	Raton	250	−76.4 m (−251 ft)	AFR Talk
WBKU	91.7 FM	NC	Ahoskie	61,500	131 m (430 ft)	AFR Hybrid
WXBE	88.3 FM	NC	Beaufort	1,000	55 m (180 ft)	AFR Talk
WRYN	89.1 FM	NC	Hickory	850	90 m (300 ft)	AFR Talk
WJKA	90.1 FM	NC	Jacksonville	17,000	85.5 m (281 ft)	AFR Talk
WAAE	91.9 FM	NC	New Bern	1,350	50 m (160 ft)	AFR Hybrid
WRAE	88.7 FM	NC	Raeford	6,000	144 m (472 ft)	AFR Talk
W204AV	88.7 FM	NC	Sanford	38	56 m (184 ft)	AFR Talk
KDVI	89.9 FM	ND	Devils Lake	250	52 m (171 ft)	AFR Hybrid
KJTW	89.9 FM	ND	Jamestown	400	47 m (154 ft)	AFR Talk
K206BV	89.1 FM	ND	Watford City	171	45 m (148 ft)	AFR Talk
WJJE	89.1 FM	OH	Delaware	6,000	100 m (330 ft)	AFR Talk
WBIE	91.5 FM	OH	Delphos	5,500	98 m (322 ft)	AFR Talk
WWGV	88.1 FM	OH	Grove City	14,000	84 m (276 ft)	AFR Talk
W216AU	91.1 FM	OH	Martins Ferry	19	51 m (167 ft)	AFR Talk
WAUI	88.3 FM	OH	Shelby	700	139 m (456 ft)	AFR Talk
WBJV	88.9 FM	OH	Steubenville	125	78 m (256 ft)	AFR Hybrid
KAKO	91.3 FM	OK	Ada	100,000	134.7 m (442 ft)	AFR Talk
KQPD	91.1 FM	OK	Ardmore	250	51 m (167 ft)	AFR Hybrid
KAYC	91.1 FM	OK	Durant	403	64 m (210 ft)	AFR Talk
K220FP	91.9 FM	OK	Elk City	140	112 m (367 ft)	AFR Talk
KXRT	90.9 FM	OK	Idabel	500	64 m (210 ft)	AFR Talk
KVRS	90.3 FM	OK	Lawton	9,800	80 m (260 ft)	AFR Talk
KARG	91.7 FM	OK	Poteau	2,500	569 m (1,867 ft)	AFR Hybrid
KAYM	90.5 FM	OK	Weatherford	2,700	86 m (282 ft)	AFR Hybrid
KANL	90.7 FM	OR	Baker City	250	199 m (653 ft)	AFR Talk
WAWN	89.5 FM	PA	Franklin	2,000	96 m (315 ft)	AFR Hybrid
W211AA	90.1 FM	PA	Harrisburg	6	137 m (449 ft)	AFR Talk
W215AA	90.9 FM	PA	Millersburg	6	189 m (620 ft)	AFR Talk
WDLL	90.5 FM	SC	Dillon	25,000	84 m (276 ft)	AFR Talk
KEEA	90.1 FM	SD	Aberdeen	1,000	30 m (98 ft)	AFR Talk
WAMP	88.1 FM	TN	Jackson	750	41 m (135 ft)	AFR Talk
WIGH	88.7 FM	TN	Jackson	14,000	164 m (538 ft)	AFR Hybrid
WAWI	89.7 FM	TN	Lawrenceburg	6,000	45 m (148 ft)	AFR Talk
WUIE	105.1 FM	TN	Lakesite	850	268 m (879 ft)	AFR Talk
WGBQ	91.9 FM	TN	Lynchburg	900	107 m (351 ft)	AFR Talk
W294BP	106.7 FM	TN	Memphis	250	105 m (344 ft)	AFR Talk
WPRH	90.9 FM	TN	Paris	5,400	96 m (315 ft)	AFR Talk
WAUV	89.7 FM	TN	Ripley	6,400	120 m (390 ft)	AFR Talk
WAZD	88.1 FM	TN	Savannah	380	39 m (128 ft)	AFR Hybrid
WBIA	88.3 FM	TN	Shelbyville	250	14 m (46 ft)	AFR Talk
W210BE	89.9 FM	TN	Waynesboro	27	33 m (108 ft)	AFR Talk
KAQD	91.3 FM	TX	Abilene	2,800	99 m (325 ft)	AFR Hybrid
KAWV	88.3 FM	TX	Alice	13,500	111 m (364 ft)	AFR Talk
KAVW	90.7 FM	TX	Amarillo	1,200	164 m (538 ft)	AFR Hybrid
KKWV	88.1 FM	TX	Aransas Pass	8,500	117 m (384 ft)	AFR Talk
KBCX	91.5 FM	TX	Big Spring	1,000	93 m (305 ft)	AFR Hybrid
KLGS	89.9 FM	TX	College Station	8,400	109 m (358 ft)	AFR Talk
KAFR	88.3 FM	TX	Conroe	100,000	135 m (443 ft)	AFR Talk
KTDA	91.7 FM	TX	Dalhart	830	39 m (128 ft)	AFR Talk
KDLI	89.9 FM	TX	Del Rio	1,000	52 m (171 ft)	AFR Hybrid
KATG	88.1 FM	TX	Elkhart	80,000	166 m (545 ft)	AFR Talk
KZFT	90.5 FM	TX	Fannett	40,000	110 m (360 ft)	AFR Hybrid
KTXG	90.5 FM	TX	Greenville	38,000	220 m (720 ft)	AFR Talk
KMEO	91.9 FM	TX	Mertzon	4,740	159 m (522 ft)	AFR Talk
KBMM	89.5 FM	TX	Odessa	25,000	163 m (535 ft)	AFR Hybrid
KAVO	90.9 FM	TX	Pampa	17,000	111 m (364 ft)	AFR Talk
KPKO	91.3 FM	TX	Pecos	900	19 m (62 ft)	AFR Hybrid
KBAH	90.5 FM	TX	Plainview	75,000	130 m (430 ft)	AFR Talk
KBDE	89.9 FM	TX	Temple	11,500	149 m (489 ft)	AFR Talk
KVHR	91.5 FM	TX	Van Horn	100	−29 m (−95 ft)	AFR Hybrid
KAYK	88.5 FM	TX	Victoria	50,000	86 m (282 ft)	AFR Talk
WARN	91.3 FM	VA	Culpeper	13,500	161 m (528 ft)	AFR Talk
WRIH	88.1 FM	VA	Richmond	5,000	145.9 m (479 ft)	AFR Talk
WTRM	91.1 FM	VA	Winchester	75	440 m (1,440 ft)	AFR Talk
KAYB	88.1 FM	WA	Sunnyside	250	−58 m (−190 ft)	AFR Talk
WBHZ	91.9 FM	WV	Elkins	275	341 m (1,119 ft)	AFR Talk
WPWV	90.1 FM	WV	Princeton	2,500	317 m (1,040 ft)	AFR Talk

=== Affiliates ===
Call sign	Frequency	State	City of license	ERP W	Height m (ft)	Network
WLJR	88.5 FM	AL	Birmingham	370	183 m (600 ft)	AFR Talk
KNLF	95.9 FM	CA	Quincy	1,000	−339 m (−1,112 ft)	AFR Talk
WLMW	90.7 FM	NH	Manchester	11 (vertical); 15 (horizontal)	265 m (869 ft)	AFR Talk
WZYZ	90.1 FM	TN	Spencer	30	180 m (590 ft)	AFR Hybrid

=== Former AFR stations ===
Call sign	Frequency	State	City of license	Notes
WAQG	91.7 FM	AL	Ozark	License canceled in 2018, silent since 2016
KBIE	89.1 FM	AZ	Fountain Hills	Sold in 2003
K206BT	89.1 FM	AZ	Fredonia	Sold in 2023
KBMH	90.3 FM	AZ	Holbrook	Sold in 2023
KAPG	88.1 FM	AR	Bentonville	Sold in 2016
KBPU	88.7 FM	AR	De Queen	Sold in 2004
KAOW	88.9 FM	AR	Fort Smith	Sold in 2017
WTLG	88.3 FM	FL	Starke	Sold in 2014
WJGS	91.5 FM	GA	Norwood	Sold in 2020
WBMF	88.1 FM	IL	Crete	Sold in 2004
WAWF	88.3 FM	IL	Kankakee	Sold in 2004
WWGN	88.9 FM	IL	Ottawa	Sold in 2004
WWLO	89.1 FM	IN	Lowell	Sold in 2009
WAPC	91.9 FM	IN	Terre Haute	Sold in 2004
KBMP	90.5 FM	KS	Enterprise	Sold in 2005
KARF	91.9 FM	KS	Independence	Sold in 2005
KSNB	91.5 FM	KS	Norton	Sold in 2023
KBDD	91.9 FM	KS	Winfield	Sold in 2004
KSJY	90.9 FM	LA	Lafayette	Sold in 2005
KBPG	89.5 FM	MN	Montevideo	Sold in 2017
KQRB	91.7 FM	MN	Windom	License surrendered in 2012, silent since 2011
KBOJ	88.1 FM	MN	Worthington	License surrendered in 2011, silent since 2010
WDFX	98.3 FM	MS	Cleveland	Sold in 2017
WKZM	89.7 FM	MS	Waynesboro	Sold in 2016
K216GK	91.1 FM	MO	Brookfield	Sold in 2023
K218BU	91.5 FM	MO	Memphis	Sold in 2023
KBKC	90.1 FM	MO	Moberly	Sold in 2004
KKNL	89.3 FM	NE	Valentine	Sold in 2019
WBFY	90.3 FM	NC	Pinehurst	Sold in 2016
KNDW	91.7 FM	ND	Williston	Sold in 2014
KAPK	91.1 FM	OR	Grants Pass	Sold in 2016
KASD	90.3 FM	SD	Rapid City	Sold in 2017
KSFS	90.1 FM	SD	Sioux Falls	Sold in 2008
WAUO	90.7 FM	TN	Hohenwald	Sold in 2023
WAUT	88.5 FM	TN	Tullahoma	Donated in 2012
K215CH	90.9 FM	TX	Alpine	Sold in 2023
KAXH	91.5 FM	TX	Borger	License canceled in 2006
KCKT	88.5 FM	TX	Crockett	Sold in 2023
K219CC	91.7 FM	TX	Dumas	Sold in 2023
KBKN	91.3 FM	TX	Lamesa	Sold in 2004
KSUR	88.9 FM	TX	Mart	Sold in 2016
WAUQ	89.7 FM	VA	Charles City	Sold in 2015
WWEN	88.1 FM	WI	Wentworth	Sold in 2016
KAXG	89.7 FM	WY	Gillette	Sold in 2003
KGLL	88.1 FM	WY	Gillette	Sold in 2018
