= KAKX =

- Mendocino, California; United States
- Frequency: 89.3 MHz

Programming
- Format: Variety

Ownership
- Owner: Mendocino Unified School District

Technical information
- Licensing authority: FCC
- Facility ID: 41164
- Class: A
- ERP: 250 watts
- HAAT: 71 meters (233 ft)
- Transmitter coordinates: 39°18′46″N 123°46′57″W

Links
- Public license information: Public file; LMS
- Website: kakx.fm

KAKX (89.3 FM) is a radio station broadcasting a variety format. It is licensed to Mendocino, California, United States. The station is currently owned by Mendocino Unified School District and is broadcast from Mendocino High School.
