= KJMC =

Radio station in Des Moines, Iowa

- Des Moines, Iowa; United States
- Frequency: 89.3 MHz
- Branding: K-Jam

Programming
- Format: Urban Adult Contemporary

Ownership
- Owner: Minority Communications, Inc. (sale to American Family Association pending)

History
- First air date: 1999
- Call sign meaning: Jam City or possibly Contemporary

Technical information
- Licensing authority: FCC
- Facility ID: 43060
- Class: C3
- ERP: 7,100 watts
- HAAT: 200 feet (61 m)
- Transmitter coordinates: 41°39′21″N 93°35′51″W

Links
- Public license information: Public file; LMS
- Website: www.kjmcfm.org

KJMC (89.3 FM) is a non-commercial educational radio station serving the Des Moines, Iowa area with an Urban Adult Contemporary format. KJMC is owned by Minority Communications, Inc.

The station was originally licensed as KLNQ on November 2, 1998, replacing KUCB-FM after Minority Communications successfully challenged its license in a seven-year battle. It changed its callsign to KJMC on March 1, 1999, when it launched.

KJMC is the Des Moines market affiliate for the Tom Joyner Morning Show and the D. L. Hughley Show. Since KJMC is a non-commercial station, the national commercials are replaced with music, public service announcements and underwriting announcements from local businesses.

In July 2025, Minority Communications, Inc. entered into an asset purchase agreement to sell KJMC to American Family Radio for 1.125 million dollars. In September of 2025 the FCC approved the sale of KJMC to American Family Radio.

== See also ==
- List of community radio stations in the United States
