= KMTG =

Radio station in San Jose, California

- San Jose, California; United States
- Broadcast area: Santa Clara Valley
- Frequency: 89.3 MHz

Programming
- Format: Campus radio

Ownership
- Owner: San Jose Unified School District

History
- Call sign meaning: Mustangs, Pioneer High School mascot

Technical information
- Licensing authority: FCC
- Facility ID: 58847
- Class: A
- ERP: 300 watts
- HAAT: −95 meters (−312 ft)
- Transmitter coordinates: 37°12′6″N 121°51′42″W

Links
- Public license information: Public file; LMS
- Website: 893thestampede.weebly.com

KMTG (89.3 FM) is a radio station broadcasting a campus radio format. Licensed to San Jose, California, United States, the station serves the San Jose area. The station is currently owned by San Jose Unified School District. and operated at Pioneer High School by Pioneer High School students. It was formerly known as KLEL started by Joe LoBue who instructed radio as a class and operated the station from Leland High School.

The station is completely student-run, educational, and non-profit. The students doing shows on the station do so as part of formal classes in broadcasting and under the supervision of the station manager. The station manager, Steve Dini, a teacher at the high school and himself a radio personality, is still active in the broadcasting field doing television commercials and writing for local radio and TV.

The format of the station is varied depending on the student shows that have been properly proposed and implemented. The station operates 24 hours a day. When the station is not featuring student shows, it continues to broadcast a mix of today's and yesterday's top music using computer automation.

One of the student shows is titled "Teal Talk", a sports radio show that covers the San Jose Sharks. Recently, the Teal Talk anchors interviewed Dan Rusanowsky, the San Jose Sharks radio play-by-play announcer.
