= WDNT (AM) =

Radio station in Spring City, Tennessee

- Spring City, Tennessee; United States
- Frequency: 970 kHz
- Branding: 101.1 The Eagle

Programming
- Format: Classic hits
- Affiliations: Fox News Radio; Premiere Networks

Ownership
- Owner: Beverly Broadcasting Company, LLC
- Sister stations: WALI, WRKQ

History
- First air date: July 12, 1979 (as WXQK)
- Former call signs: WXQK (1979–2010); WRHA (2010–2019)

Technical information
- Licensing authority: FCC
- Facility ID: 54469
- Class: D
- Power: 500 watts day 24 watts night
- Transmitter coordinates: 35°39′59.00″N 84°52′44.00″W
- Translator: 101.1 W266DE (Spring City)

Links
- Public license information: Public file; LMS
- Webcast: Listen live
- Website: rheacountyradio.com

WDNT (970 AM) is an American radio station broadcasting a classic hits radio format. Licensed to Spring City, Tennessee, United States, the station is currently owned by Beverly Broadcasting Company, LLC and features programming from Fox News Radio.

== FM translator ==
In addition to the main station at 970 kHz, WDNT is relayed to an FM translator at 101.1 MHz. WDNT uses the translator frequency as the main frequency in the logo and branding. The FM translator provides a wider coverage area during nighttime hours when the AM frequency at 970 AM reduces power to only 24 watts. The FM frequency also affords the listener high fidelity sound.

Broadcast translator for WDNT
Call sign	Frequency	City of license	FID	ERP (W)	Class	FCC info
W266DE	101.1 FM	Spring City, Tennessee	200372	105	D	LMS
