= WUIE =

Radio station in Lakesite/Chattanooga, Tennessee

Coordinates: 35.256°N 85.226°W

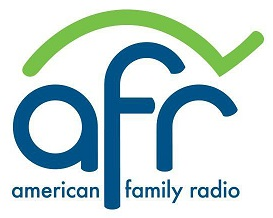

Lakesite, Tennessee; United States
- Broadcast area: Chattanooga metropolitan area
- Frequency: 105.1 MHz
- Branding: American Family Radio

Programming
- Format: Christian talk and teaching

Ownership
- Owner: American Family Association

History
- First air date: 1976 (as WNFM at 104.9)
- Former call signs: WNFM (1975–1982); WLCY (1982–1987); WTCX (1987–1992); WDNT-FM (1992–2006); WALV-FM (2006–2021)
- Former frequencies: 104.9 MHz (1976–2008)

Technical information
- Facility ID: 70784
- Class: A
- ERP: 850 watts
- HAAT: 268 meters (879 ft)

Links
- Webcast: Listen live
- Website: afr.net

WUIE (105.1 MHz) is a non-commercial FM radio station licensed to Lakesite, Tennessee, and serving the Chattanooga metropolitan area. It is owned by the American Family Association and it broadcasts a Christian talk and teaching radio format. Religious leaders heard on WUIE include David Jeremiah, Jim Daly, James Dobson, Nancy DeMoss Wolgemuth, Adrian Rogers and Alistair Begg.

WUIE has an effective radiated power (ERP) of 850 watts. The transmitter is on Montlake Road in Soddy-Daisy.

== History ==
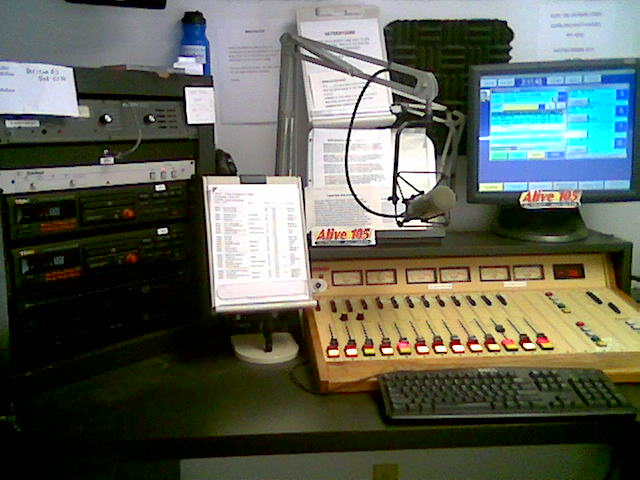
The former WALV-FM main broadcast studio in Cleveland, Tennessee

=== 104.9 MHz ===
The station signed on the air on July 1, 1976, as WNFM in Dayton, Tennessee. It broadcast on 104.9 MHz, and was owned by Norman A. Thomas. Thomas quickly sold WNFM to the WDNT Broadcasting Company, co-owned with WDNT AM 1280. The call sign was changed to WLCY in 1982 as an adult contemporary station, WTCX in 1987, and WDNT-FM in 1992. As WDNT-FM, the station initially broadcast country music. It later became "Oldies 104.9", programmed by the late Max Hackett, a longtime talk show host in the market. WDNT-FM eventually became "Lite Rock" and the station reverted to its adult contemporary format.

In 2006, the format of WALV "Alive 95", which had signed on in 1983 at 95.3 (later WPLZ, now WALV-FM again), was relocated to this frequency. Brewer Broadcasting had acquired 95.3 in 1998 and proceeded to give the station a more uptempo and competitive sound. Morning drive was handled by Mike Lee and Ed Ramsey from 1998 until late 2006. In December 2007, WALV-FM's main broadcast studio was moved to downtown Chattanooga with sister stations WJTT and WMPZ; sister station WHJK-FM was also moved into the Chattanooga building at this time.

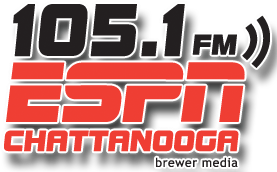
Former WALV 105.1 logo

=== Move to 105.1 ===
WALV-FM was approved to move to 105.1 MHz in December 2008, along with a power increase that added the larger Chattanooga radio market to the station's coverage area. On June 15, 2009, WALV-FM dropped its Hot AC format and its "Alive" name. It flipped to a sports radio format, using programming from ESPN Radio. It called itself "ESPN 105.1 The Zone". Wells Guthrie was the station's program director.

On September 1, 2021, WALV-FM switched dial positions. Its sports format and call letters moved to 95.3 FM Ooltewah. At the same time, American Family Radio's Christian talk and teaching format took over the 105.1 frequency under the new call sign WUIE.
