= KKNL =

Coordinates: 42.889444°N 100.554167°W

- Valentine, Nebraska; United States
- Broadcast area: Valentine, Nebraska
- Frequency: 89.3 MHz

Ownership
- Owner: Community Public Media

History
- First air date: 2010

Technical information
- Licensing authority: FCC
- Facility ID: 122329
- Class: A
- ERP: 250 watts
- HAAT: 56 meters (184 ft)

Links
- Public license information: Public file; LMS

KKNL (89.3 MHz) is a radio station licensed to Valentine, Nebraska, and is owned by Community Public Media.

== History ==
KKNL began broadcasting in 2010. It was originally owned by American Family Association, and was an affiliate of American Family Radio's AFR Talk network. KKNL replaced an American Family Radio translator, K207CG, that had broadcast on the same frequency and was first licensed in 1998. The station was taken silent on November 13, 2017. Effective May 21, 2019, the station was sold to Community Public Media for $2,500.
