= WSAA =

Air 1 radio station in Benton, Tennessee

- Benton, Tennessee; United States
- Broadcast area: Cleveland, Tennessee
- Frequency: 93.1 MHz
- Branding: Air1

Programming
- Format: Christian worship
- Affiliations: Air1

Ownership
- Owner: Educational Media Foundation

History
- First air date: November 1996; 29 years ago
- Former call signs: WBIN-FM (1992–1998); WOCE (1998–2006)

Technical information
- Licensing authority: FCC
- Facility ID: 63493
- Class: A
- ERP: 3,500 watts
- HAAT: 133.1 meters (437 ft)
- Transmitter coordinates: 35°9′54.00″N 84°51′13.00″W

Links
- Public license information: Public file; LMS
- Webcast: Listen Live
- Website: air1.com

WSAA (93.1 FM) is a radio station broadcasting a Christian worship format from Air1. Licensed to Benton, Tennessee, United States, the station serves the Cleveland, Tennessee area. The station is owned by Educational Media Foundation.

== History ==
The station was assigned the call sign WBIN-FM on July 3, 1992; it signed on in November 1996 with an adult contemporary format. In April 1998, WBIN-FM dropped a contemporary Christian format and began simulcasting a southern gospel format with WBIN (1540 AM); on May 18, 1998, the station changed its call sign to WOCE, ahead of a change to adult contemporary that July.

In September 2000, the adult contemporary format moved to WCLE-FM (104.1); WOCE then changed to a ranchera format from Jones Radio Network. By February 2001, the station was carrying programming from the Z-Spanish Network, switching from its Spanish-language hits programming to regional Mexican. On April 3, 2006, the call sign was changed to WSAA. Following a silent period, the station returned to the air with a country music format, "Ocoee 93", on September 2, 2008.

WSAA carried an adult hits format under the "Jack FM" beginning in May 2009, after WPLZ (95.3 FM) switched from "Jack FM" to a news/talk format. On September 6, 2011, WSAA changed its format to EMF's Air 1 Christian rock format; the "Jack FM" format moved to WQMT (93.9 FM).
