= WDWZ =

- Andalusia, Alabama; United States
- Frequency: 89.3 MHz
- Branding: News Talk Radio

Programming
- Format: News/Talk

Ownership
- Owner: B. Jordan Communications Corporation

Technical information
- Licensing authority: FCC
- Facility ID: 173740
- Class: A
- ERP: 1,400 watts
- HAAT: 103 metres (338 ft)
- Transmitter coordinates: 31°18′10″N 86°29′10″W

Links
- Public license information: Public file; LMS
- Website: Official Website

WDWZ (89.3 FM) is a radio station licensed to serve the community of Andalusia, Alabama. The station is owned by B. Jordan Communications Corporation. It airs a News/Talk radio format.

The station was assigned the WDWZ call letters by the Federal Communications Commission on September 3, 2012.
