= KUGS =

Radio station at Western Washington University in Bellingham, Washington

- Bellingham, Washington; United States
- Frequency: 89.3 MHz
- Branding: KUGS 89.3

Programming
- Format: College radio

Ownership
- Owner: Western Washington University

History
- First air date: January 29, 1974

Technical information
- Licensing authority: FCC
- Facility ID: 72017
- Class: A
- ERP: 810 watts
- HAAT: 137 meters (449 ft)
- Transmitter coordinates: 48°44′8.5″N 122°28′53.5″W

Links
- Public license information: Public file; LMS
- Webcast: Listen live
- Website: engage.wwu.edu/programs/kugs/

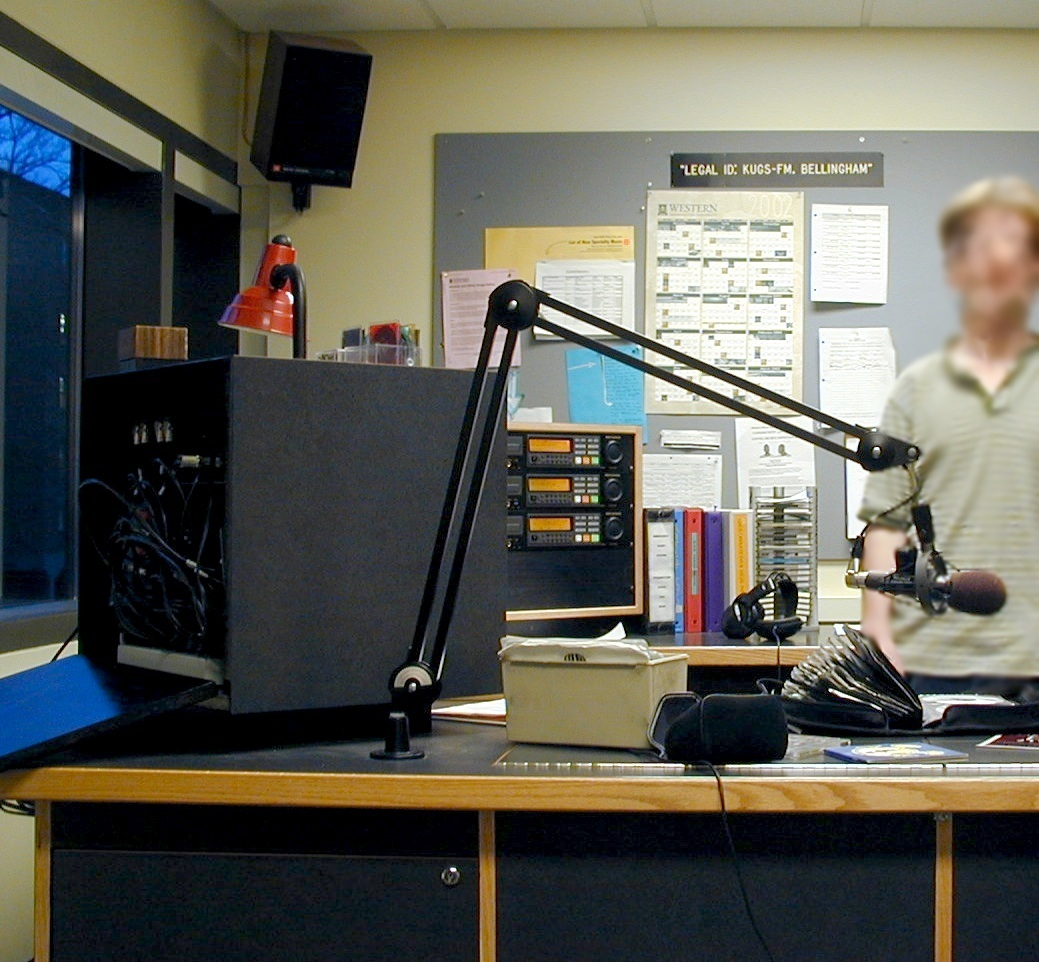
Inside the main broadcasting studio, 2002

KUGS (89.3 FM) is a college radio station in Bellingham, Washington, owned by Western Washington University (WWU). It is managed by WWU students and broadcasts from studios in the Viking Union on the WWU campus in Bellingham and transmits from atop Sehome Hill.

KUGS was founded on January 29, 1974, as a 10-watt facility, upgrading in 1984 to 100 watts. Programming has traditionally been eclectic in nature with student DJs and staff.

== History ==
Radio activity at the campus of what was then Western Washington College of Education and later Western Washington State College dated to the late 1930s, when a radio studio was built to accommodate a radio broadcasting class. The idea of starting an FM station was first floated in 1964, when the university approved the speech department's proposal to establish one, but there was no space on campus to accommodate the facility. Later in the decade, a steering committee suggested launching a regional Class C radio station by 1970.

In 1973, proposals for a radio station advanced significantly. Speech student Steve Mellroth was elected to the Associated Students student government on a platform of starting an FM station; in the sparsely attended special election, 97 percent of students surveyed voted yes to establishing one. Western Washington State College applied to the Federal Communications Commission (FCC) on June 22 for a new noncommercial educational station to broadcast with 10 watts from the Ridgeway Kappa dormitory; the FCC granted the application on October 5. Studios would be located in an office once used as storage in the Ridgeway dining hall, with a mix of music and taped educational programs. Once the permit was obtained, work began with the goal of starting by Thanksgiving, but delays in receiving equipment and being assigned call letters held up completion.

KUGS went on the air on January 29, 1974. The call sign was assigned after other designations requested by Western were found to not be available. By year's end, some 40 students comprised the KUGS staff, most of them journalism students interested in radio. Studios moved from Ridgeway to the Viking Union in 1979.

Changes in FCC regulations led to a power increase as the commission pressured 10-watt educational stations to upgrade to at least 100 watts or face being bumped off their frequencies in the future. In December 1979, the Western Washington University board of trustees applied to increase power. The road was eventually cleared for the upgrade in 1983, in part because a proposed radio station across the border in Chilliwack, British Columbia, that would have interfered with KUGS ran out of money and remained unbuilt. The upgrade became reality on January 18, 1984.

In the late 1980s, the station also began broadcasting university athletic events, complementing an eclectic lineup of specialty shows and local news. In 1992, an attempt was made to install a more consistent rock format during daytime hours, but a community group opposed the change. Vandalism that August left the station unable to broadcast, but the groups opposed to the change denied any connection with the damage.

In 1988, the transmitter was moved to Sehome Hill and the station began broadcasting in stereo. This marked a move away from the original Ridgeway Kappa site, which created interference for telephone and television signals in the dormitory. A former KUGS station manager and longtime WWU employee remarked in 2003, "I like to say people had to wear tin foil on their heads to be able to talk on the phone." Despite that, the Sehome Hill transmitter had its drawback: the tower was on the city side of the hill, blocking many WWU dormitories from clear reception. This issue was mitigated when KUGS's signal was included on the local cable system for the first time in February 1996, due, in part, to pressure placed by station supporters on the Bellingham city council.

KUGS celebrated its 21st anniversary in 1995, and repeated the anniversary for several more years thereafter by popular demand. It had also matured considerably, becoming one of two "core reporters" to College Music Journal (alongside KCMU at the University of Washington), beginning 24-hour broadcasting in 1995, and simultaneously becoming the second station in the United States to webcast its programming. (It temporarily paused streaming in 2002 due to changes in copyright royalty regulations but resumed in 2006.) Pacifica Radio Network programming, such as Democracy Now!, was added to the schedule in 1997.

A potential interference problem arose in the late 1990s between KUGS and a proposed translator for KPLU-FM that would operate on 89.3 MHz at Port Angeles, southwest across the Salish Sea. KPLU's owner, Pacific Lutheran University, filed the proposal in 1998 because its existing translator there was endangered by a new CBC radio station, CBCV-FM, in Victoria, British Columbia. A similar situation involving a transmitter for Northwest Public Radio at Port Angeles had severely reduced the coverage area of KSVR at Skagit Valley College. Associated Students allotted $15,000 for an engineering consultant to help KUGS work with Pacific Lutheran on reducing interference. KUGS also filed for a power upgrade to 710 watts, and the Educational Media Foundation proposed a new station at Sequim, near Port Angeles. The proposals were addressed in 2003 as part of a larger series of settlement agreements made two years earlier involving Pacific Lutheran and the Educational Media Foundation; the latter withdrew its application, while KPLU and KUGS won their proposed facilities.
