= KLRB =

- Stuart, Oklahoma; United States
- Frequency: 89.9 MHz

Programming
- Format: Southern Gospel

Ownership
- Owner: Lighthouse of Prayer, Inc.

Technical information
- Licensing authority: FCC
- Facility ID: 93276
- Class: C2
- ERP: 31,000 watts
- HAAT: 94 meters (308 ft)
- Transmitter coordinates: 34°54′57″N 96°8′10″W

Links
- Public license information: Public file; LMS

KLRB (89.9 FM) is a radio station licensed to Stuart, Oklahoma. The station is currently owned by Lighthouse of Prayer, Inc.

== History ==
This station was assigned call sign KLRB on June 22, 2002.
