= WJIK =

Coordinates: 31.8911°N 87.7125°W

- Fulton, Alabama; United States
- Broadcast area: Thomasville, Alabama
- Frequency: 89.3 MHz
- Branding: SonLife Broadcasting Network

Programming
- Format: Christian radio

Ownership
- Owner: Family Worship Center Church, Inc.

History
- First air date: 2011
- Call sign meaning: Where Jesus Is King

Technical information
- Licensing authority: FCC
- Facility ID: 90846
- Class: A
- ERP: 2,100 watts
- HAAT: 166 meters (545 ft)

Links
- Public license information: Public file; LMS
- Webcast: Listen live
- Website: sonlifetv.com

WJIK is a Christian radio station licensed to Fulton, Alabama, broadcasting on 89.3 FM. WJIK is owned by Family Worship Center Church, Inc.

== History ==
The station was originally owned by Penfold Communications, airing a Christian format, and began broadcasting in 2011. The station was silent for periods in 2012, 2015, and 2017, due to technical issues. In 2017, the station was donated to Family Worship Center Church, Inc.
