= WQMT =

- Hopewell, Tennessee; United States
- Broadcast area: Chattanooga, Tennessee
- Frequency: 93.9 MHz
- Branding: Que Buena 101.9 / 93.9

Programming
- Format: Spanish Adult hits

Ownership
- Owner: East Tennessee Radio Group III, L.P.

History
- First air date: 1989 (as WAYA)
- Former call signs: WAYA (1989–2010)

Technical information
- Licensing authority: FCC
- Facility ID: 70782
- Class: C3
- ERP: 16,500 watts
- HAAT: 122.6 meters
- Transmitter coordinates: 35°21′55.00″N 84°45′22.00″W

Links
- Public license information: Public file; LMS
- Website: https://quebuenachatt.com/

WQMT (93.9 FM) is a radio station broadcasting a Spanish adult hits radio format. Licensed to serve Hopewell, Tennessee, United States, the station is currently owned by East Tennessee Radio Group III, L.P.

== History ==
Through September 2011, the station carried a country music format, as "Cat Country 93.9". In September, the station flipped to the Jack FM adult hits format, after the previous station, WSAA, changed to the Christian Air 1 format. Early in 2012, WQMT changed to oldies. Later in the year, the station changed to Spanish.

On October 20, 2014, WQMT flipped back to country as Tennessee Country 93.9.

On October 1, 2015, WQMT changed their format to Spanish adult hits, branded as "Juan 93.9".

Effective September 1, 2022, the station was licensed to move its community of license from Decatur, Tennessee to Hopewell.
