= WRKQ =

- Madisonville, Tennessee; United States
- Frequency: 1250 kHz
- Branding: 105.9 Rad Radio

Programming
- Format: 1980's hits
- Affiliations: CBS, Westwood One

Ownership
- Owner: Storm Front Communications, LLC

History
- First air date: 1968; 58 years ago
- Former call signs: WRKQ (1982–1989); WINW (1989–1990)

Technical information
- Licensing authority: FCC
- Facility ID: 43522
- Class: D
- Power: 500 watts (day); 84 watts (night)
- Transmitter coordinates: 35°30′29.00″N 84°22′45.00″W
- Translator: (105.9 MHz) W290DS (Madisonville)

Links
- Public license information: Public file; LMS

WRKQ (1250 AM) is an American radio station broadcasting a 1980s hits format. Licensed to Madisonville, Tennessee, United States, the station is currently owned by Storm Front Communications, LLC. WRKQ is a CBS Radio News affiliate.
