= WECC-FM =

- Folkston, Georgia; United States
- Broadcast area: Jacksonville area
- Frequency: 89.3 MHz
- Branding: The Lighthouse

Programming
- Format: Contemporary Christian
- Affiliations: Salem Radio Network

Ownership
- Owner: Lighthouse Christian Broadcasting Corporation

History
- Call sign meaning: "We Celebrate Christ"

Technical information
- Licensing authority: FCC
- Facility ID: 81294
- Class: C2
- ERP: 30,000 watts
- HAAT: 149.1 meters (489 ft)
- Transmitter coordinates: 30°55′54.00″N 81°42′30.00″W

Links
- Public license information: Public file; LMS
- Webcast: Listen live
- Website: thelighthousefm.org

WECC-FM (89.3 MHz) is a radio station broadcasting a contemporary Christian format. Licensed to Folkston, Georgia, United States, the station is owned by Lighthouse Christian Broadcasting Corporation. The station also broadcasts on 1190 AM, WPAA.

Former logo
