= KBBG =

African American community radio station in Waterloo, Iowa

- Waterloo, Iowa; United States
- Frequency: 88.1 MHz (HD Radio)

Programming
- Format: Mixed

Ownership
- Owner: Afro American Community Broadcasting, Inc.

History
- First air date: August 12, 1978
- Call sign meaning: "Black Broadcasting Group"; "Beautiful Black Giant"

Technical information
- Licensing authority: FCC
- Class: C3
- ERP: 9,500 watts
- HAAT: 47 meters (154 ft)
- Transmitter coordinates: 42°30′45″N 92°19′24″W

Links
- Public license information: Public file; LMS

KBBG (88.1 FM) was a non-commercial educational radio station licensed to Waterloo, Iowa, United States. KBBG is owned by Afro American Community Broadcasting, Inc and is organized as a 501(C)3 tax-exempt organization. Jimmie Porter founded the corporation in 1977 with a group of 16 other Waterloo residents. He remained active in its leadership, along with a board of directors, until his death in 2007.

KBBG began broadcasting on August 12, 1978 as Waterloo's first black-owned station, using a 10 watt transmitter, and upgraded on December 27, 1980, to 9,500 watts of power.

KBBG is a member-supported station of the Corporation for Public Broadcasting and is an affiliate of American Urban Radio Network (SBN).

KBBG is broadcasting using the HD Radio digital format as well as traditional analog audio.

== See also ==
- List of community radio stations in the United States
