= WBIN (Tennessee) =

Radio station in Benton, Tennessee, United States (1977–2019)

- Benton, Tennessee; United States
- Frequency: 1540 kHz
- Branding: The Light

Programming
- Format: Religion

Ownership
- Owner: George C. Hudson, III
- Sister stations: WCPH, WENR

History
- First air date: May 18, 1977
- Former call signs: WWRO (2020)

Technical information
- Facility ID: 63492
- Class: D
- Power: 1,000 watts day 500 watts critical hours 4 watts night
- Transmitter coordinates: 35°10′50.00″N 84°38′34.00″W

WBIN (1540 AM) was a radio station licensed to Benton, Tennessee, United States. The station was last owned by George C. Hudson, III. The station went silent on September 19, 2019; its license was surrendered to the Federal Communications Commission on September 8, 2020, and cancelled on September 15, 2020 as WWRO, although this call sign was never used on the air.

== History ==
The station signed on May 18, 1977, as WBIN, a 250-watt daytimer owned by Stonewood Communications Corporation. It increased its power to 1,000 watts in 1979. By 1989, the station was programming southern traditional gospel. A $197,000 sale of WBIN and the construction permit for WBIN-FM (93.1) to Family Communications was announced in 1995; for a period, WBIN shifted to a general religious format, but returned to southern gospel in December 1996.

Stonewood sold WBIN and WBIN-FM to BP Broadcasters for $265,000 in 1998. Upon taking over under a local marketing agreement that April, BP began simulcasting WBIN's southern gospel programming on WBIN-FM, replacing a contemporary Christian format; the simulcast ended in July, when the FM station became adult contemporary station WOCE.

BP Broadcasters sold WBIN to John and Jane Sines for $79,000 in 1999. The Sines programmed WBIN as a religious station; by 2003, the station was affiliated with the Three Angels Broadcasting Network.

The Sines donated WBIN to Pioneer Health and Missions in 2019. On September 19, 2019, WBIN went silent following the loss of its transmitter site; in applying for silent authority, Pioneer disclosed that it was in the process of selling the station. WBIN was acquired by George C. Hudson, III, effective June 2, 2020 for $2,500. The call sign was changed to WWRO on July 6, 2020, to allow the WBIN call letters to be transferred to a station in Atlanta. The Benton station never returned to the air as WWRO.
