= WGSS (FM) =

- Copiague, New York; United States
- Frequency: 89.3 MHz

Programming
- Language: English
- Format: Christian radio

Ownership
- Owner: Calvary Chapel of Hope

History
- First air date: April 2012
- Call sign meaning: "God Still Speaks"

Technical information
- Licensing authority: FCC
- Facility ID: 175776
- Class: A
- ERP: 110 watts
- HAAT: 10 meters (33 ft)
- Transmitter coordinates: 40°40′58″N 73°23′04″W

Links
- Public license information: Public file; LMS
- Webcast: Listen live (via TuneIn)
- Website: www.godstillspeaks.com

WGSS (89.3 FM) is a non-commercial educational radio station licensed to Copiague, New York. It broadcasts a Christian radio format and is owned by Calvary Chapel of Hope.

== History ==
In October 2007, Calvary Chapel of Hope applied to the Federal Communications Commission (FCC) for a construction permit for a new non-commercial FM radio station. The FCC granted the permit on April 20, 2009, with a scheduled expiration of April 20, 2012. The station was assigned the WGSS call sign by the FCC on May 12, 2009. WGSS began broadcasting in early April 2012 and received its broadcast license on April 24, 2012.
