= WKRT (FM) =

Coordinates: 39.869°N 84.796°W

Richmond, Indiana; United States
- Frequency: 89.3 MHz

Programming
- Format: Christian adult contemporary
- Network: K-Love

Ownership
- Owner: Educational Media Foundation

History
- Former call signs: WVXR (1988–2007); WZRP (2007–2009); WKRT (2009–2019); WJKL (2019–2020)

Technical information
- Licensing authority: FCC
- Facility ID: 74295
- Class: B1
- ERP: 4,200 watts
- HAAT: 57 meters (187 ft)

Links
- Public license information: Public file; LMS
- Website: klove.com

WKRT (89.3 FM) is an American non-commercial radio station located in Richmond, Indiana, and operates on the assigned frequency of 89.3 MHz.

== History ==
The station previously had the call sign of WVXR and was owned by Cincinnati Classical Public Radio. Three repeater stations (including WVXR) were sold to Christian Voice of Central Ohio in 2007 because of the small population and lack of a revenue stream from the outlying communities and to pay off the debt incurred by the purchase of seven stations in 2005 from Xavier University for $15 million. As of 2007, the then-WZRP was one of three stations that operated under the name of "The Promise Radio Network". In 2009, the station was sold by Christian Voices of Central Ohio to Educational Media Foundation. On October 7 of that year, the station officially became WKRT, broadcasting EMF's Adult contemporary Christian format, K-LOVE. The station changed its call sign to WJKL on July 11, 2019. The station reverted to the WKRT call letters on May 14, 2020.
