= List of FM radio stations in the United States by call sign (initial letters WW–WZ) =

This is a list of FM radio stations in the United States having call signs beginning with the letters WW through WZ. Low-power FM radio stations, those with designations such as WWBJ-LP, have not been included in this list.

== WW ==
Callsign	Frequency	City of license
WWAG	107.9 FM	McKee, Kentucky
WWAV	102.1 FM	Santa Rosa Beach, Florida
WWBB	101.5 FM	Providence, Rhode Island
WWBD	94.7 FM	Sumter, South Carolina
WWBL	106.5 FM	Washington, Indiana
WWBN	101.5 FM	Tuscola, Michigan
WWBR	100.9 FM	Big Rapids, Michigan
WWCF	88.7 FM	McConnellsburg, Pennsylvania
WWCJ	89.1 FM	Cape May, New Jersey
WWCK-FM	105.5 FM	Flint, Michigan
WWCM	96.9 FM	Standish, Michigan
WWCN	99.3 FM	Fort Myers Beach, Florida
WWCQ	107.9 FM	Chiefland, Florida
WWCT	99.9 FM	Bartonville, Illinois
WWCU	90.5 FM	Cullowhee, North Carolina
WWDC	101.1 FM	Washington, District of Columbia
WWDE-FM	101.3 FM	Hampton, Virginia
WWDK	94.1 FM	Jackson, Michigan
WWDL	91.3 FM	Plainfield, Indiana
WWDM	101.3 FM	Sumter, South Carolina
WWDV	96.9 FM	Zion, Illinois
WWDW	107.7 FM	Alberta, Virginia
WWEC	88.3 FM	Elizabethtown, Pennsylvania
WWEG	106.9 FM	Myersville/Hagerstown, Maryland
WWEI	105.5 FM	Easthampton, Massachusetts
WWEL	103.9 FM	London, Kentucky
WWEN	88.1 FM	Wentworth, Wisconsin
WWER	88.1 FM	Colonial Beach, Virginia
WWES	88.9 FM	Mt. Kisco, New York
WWET	91.7 FM	Valdosta, Georgia
WWEV-FM	91.5 FM	Cumming, Georgia
WWFA	102.7 FM	St. Florian, Alabama
WWFF-FM	93.3 FM	New Market, Alabama
WWFG	99.9 FM	Ocean City, Maryland
WWFJ	88.1 FM	East Fayetteville, North Carolina
WWFK	107.1 FM	Dannemora, New York
WWFM	89.1 FM	Trenton, New Jersey
WWFN-FM	100.5 FM	Marion, South Carolina
WWFP	90.5 FM	Brigantine, New Jersey
WWFR	91.7 FM	Stuart, Florida
WWFW	103.9 FM	Fort Wayne, Indiana
WWFX	100.1 FM	Southbridge, Massachusetts
WWFY	100.9 FM	Berlin, Vermont
WWGA	98.9 FM	Tallapoosa, Georgia
WWGF	107.5 FM	Donalsonville, Georgia
WWGM	93.9 FM	Selmer, Tennessee
WWGN	88.9 FM	Ottawa, Illinois
WWGO	92.1 FM	Charleston, Illinois
WWGR	101.9 FM	Fort Myers, Florida
WWGV	88.1 FM	Grove City, Ohio
WWGY	99.3 FM	Fulton, Kentucky
WWHG	105.9 FM	Evansville, Wisconsin
WWHR	91.7 FM	Bowling Green, Kentucky
WWHT	107.9 FM	Syracuse, New York
WWHX	100.7 FM	Normal, Illinois
WWIB	103.7 FM	Hallie, Wisconsin
WWIL-FM	90.5 FM	Wilmington, North Carolina
WWIN-FM	95.9 FM	Glen Burnie, Maryland
WWIO-FM	88.9 FM	Brunswick, Georgia
WWIP	89.1 FM	Cheriton, Virginia
WWIS-FM	99.7 FM	Black River Falls, Wisconsin
WWIZ	103.9 FM	West Middlesex, Pennsylvania
WWJC	101.5 FM	Augusta, Wisconsin
WWJD	91.7 FM	Pippa Passes, Kentucky
WWJJ	91.7 FM	Jasper, Florida
WWJM	105.9 FM	New Lexington, Ohio
WWJO	98.1 FM	St. Cloud, Minnesota
WWKA	92.3 FM	Orlando, Florida
WWKC	104.9 FM	Caldwell, Ohio
WWKI	100.5 FM	Kokomo, Indiana
WWKL	106.7 FM	Hershey, Pennsylvania
WWKM	93.1 FM	Rochelle, Georgia
WWKR	94.1 FM	Hart, Michigan
WWKS	96.1 FM	Charlotte Amalie, United States Virgin Islands
WWKT-FM	99.3 FM	Kingstree, South Carolina
WWKX	106.3 FM	Woonsocket, Rhode Island
WWKY-FM	104.9 FM	Providence, Kentucky
WWKZ	103.9 FM	Okolona, Mississippi
WWL-FM	105.3 FM	Kenner, Louisiana
WWLA	103.1 FM	Johnstown, Ohio
WWLB	93.1 FM	Ettrick, Virginia
WWLD	102.3 FM	Cairo, Georgia
WWLG	107.1 FM	Circleville, Ohio
WWLI	105.1 FM	Providence, Rhode Island
WWLK-FM	101.5 FM	Meredith, New Hampshire
WWLL	105.7 FM	Sebring, Florida
WWLN	91.5 FM	Lincoln, Maine
WWLS-FM	98.1 FM	The Village, Oklahoma
WWLT	103.1 FM	Manchester, Kentucky
WWLU	88.7 FM	Lincoln University, Pennsylvania
WWLV	94.1 FM	Lexington, North Carolina
WWLW	106.5 FM	Clarksburg, West Virginia
WWLY	100.1 FM	Panama City Beach, Florida
WWMG	97.1 FM	Millbrook, Alabama
WWMJ	95.7 FM	Ellsworth, Maine
WWMK	106.3 FM	Onaway, Michigan
WWMP	102.3 FM	Grand Isle, Vermont
WWMR	102.9 FM	Saltillo, Mississippi
WWMS	97.5 FM	Oxford, Mississippi
WWMX	106.5 FM	Baltimore, Maryland
WWMY	102.3 FM	Beech Mountain, North Carolina
WWNJ	91.1 FM	Toms River Township, New Jersey
WWNO	89.9 FM	New Orleans, Louisiana
WWNW	88.9 FM	New Wilmington, Pennsylvania
WWOD	93.9 FM	Woodstock, Vermont
WWOF	103.1 FM	Tallahassee, Florida
WWOG	90.9 FM	Cookeville, Tennessee
WWOJ	99.1 FM	Avon Park, Florida
WWON-FM	100.7 FM	Waynesboro, Tennessee
WWOO	95.3 FM	Dillsboro, North Carolina
WWOS-FM	91.9 FM	St. George, South Carolina
WWOX	94.1 FM	Milan, New Hampshire
WWOZ	90.7 FM	New Orleans, Louisiana
WWPC	91.7 FM	New Durham, New Hampshire
WWPE-FM	92.1 FM	Hermantown, Minnesota
WWPG	104.3 FM	Eutaw, Alabama
WWPH	107.9 FM	Princeton Junction, New Jersey
WWPJ	89.5 FM	Pen Argyl, Pennsylvania
WWPN	101.1 FM	Westernport, Maryland
WWPR-FM	105.1 FM	New York City
WWPT	90.3 FM	Westport, Connecticut
WWPW	105.3 FM	Bowdon, Georgia
WWQA	90.7 FM	Albany, Georgia
WWQB	99.7 FM	Westwood, Kentucky
WWQC	107.3 FM	Clifton, Illinois
WWQD	90.3 FM	De Kalb, Mississippi
WWQE	89.7 FM	Elberton, Georgia
WWQI	91.3 FM	Morristown, Indiana
WWQK	88.7 FM	Oak Ridge, Tennessee
WWQM-FM	106.3 FM	Middleton, Wisconsin
WWQQ-FM	101.3 FM	Wilmington, North Carolina
WWQS	88.5 FM	Decatur, Tennessee
WWQW	90.3 FM	Wartburg, Tennessee
WWQY	90.3 FM	Yadkin, North Carolina
WWRA	91.9 FM	Clinton, Louisiana
WWRE	105.1 FM	Bridgewater, Virginia
WWRM	94.9 FM	Tampa, Florida
WWRN	88.5 FM	Rockport, Massachusetts
WWRQ-FM	107.9 FM	Valdosta, Georgia
WWRR	104.9 FM	Scranton, Pennsylvania
WWRX	107.7 FM	Bradford, Rhode Island
WWRZ	98.3 FM	Fort Meade, Florida
WWSE	93.3 FM	Jamestown, New York
WWSK	94.3 FM	Smithtown, New York
WWSL	102.3 FM	Philadelphia, Mississippi
WWSN	92.5 FM	Newaygo, Michigan
WWSP	89.9 FM	Stevens Point, Wisconsin
WWSR	93.1 FM	Lima, Ohio
WWSS	95.3 FM	Tuscarora Township, Michigan
WWST	102.1 FM	Sevierville, Tennessee
WWSU	106.9 FM	Fairborn, Ohio
WWSW-FM	94.5 FM	Pittsburgh, Pennsylvania
WWTG	88.1 FM	Carpentersville, Illinois
WWTH	100.7 FM	Oscoda, Michigan
WWTN	99.7 FM	Hendersonville, Tennessee
WWTP	89.5 FM	Augusta, Maine
WWUF	97.7 FM	Waycross, Georgia
WWUH	91.3 FM	West Hartford, Connecticut
WWUN-FM	101.5 FM	Friar's Point, Mississippi
WWUS	104.1 FM	Big Pine Key, Florida
WWUU	101.1 FM	Washington, Mississippi
WWUZ	96.9 FM	Bowling Green, Virginia
WWVR	98.5 FM	Paris, Illinois
WWVT-FM	89.9 FM	Ferrum, Virginia
WWVU-FM	91.7 FM	Morgantown, West Virginia
WWWA	95.3 FM	Winslow, Maine
WWWD	102.1 FM	Bolingbroke, Georgia
WWWF-FM	103.1 FM	Bay Shore, New York
WWWI-FM	95.9 FM	Pillager, Minnesota
WWWK	105.5 FM	Islamorada, Florida
WWWM-FM	105.7 FM	Eden Prairie, Minnesota
WWWQ	99.7 FM	Atlanta
WWWT-FM	107.7 FM	Manassas, Virginia
WWWV	97.5 FM	Charlottesville, Virginia
WWWW-FM	102.9 FM	Ann Arbor, Michigan
WWWX	96.9 FM	Oshkosh, Wisconsin
WWWY	106.1 FM	North Vernon, Indiana
WWWZ	93.3 FM	Summerville, South Carolina
WWXM	97.7 FM	Garden City, South Carolina
WWYL	104.1 FM	Chenango Bridge, New York
WWYN	106.9 FM	McKenzie, Tennessee
WWYY	107.1 FM	Belvidere, New Jersey
WWYZ	92.5 FM	Waterbury, Connecticut
WWZD-FM	106.7 FM	New Albany, Mississippi
WWZW	96.7 FM	Buena Vista, Virginia
WWZY	107.1 FM	Long Branch, New Jersey

== WX ==
Callsign	Frequency	City of license
WXAC	91.3 FM	Reading, Pennsylvania
WXAF	90.9 FM	Charleston, West Virginia
WXAJ	99.7 FM	Hillsboro, Illinois
WXAN	103.9 FM	Ava, Illinois
WXAV	88.3 FM	Chicago
WXBA	88.1 FM	Brentwood, New York
WXBB	94.7 FM	Erie, Pennsylvania
WXBC	104.3 FM	Hardinsburg, Kentucky
WXBE	88.3 FM	Beaufort, North Carolina
WXBK	94.7 FM	Newark, New Jersey
WXBM-FM	102.7 FM	Milton, Florida
WXBP	90.3 FM	Corinth, Maine
WXBQ-FM	96.9 FM	Bristol, Virginia
WXBT	100.1 FM	West Columbia, South Carolina
WXBW	101.5 FM	Gallipolis, Ohio
WXBX	95.3 FM	Rural Retreat, Virginia
WXCC	96.5 FM	Williamson, West Virginia
WXCH	102.9 FM	Columbus, Indiana
WXCI	91.7 FM	Danbury, Connecticut
WXCL	104.9 FM	Pekin, Illinois
WXCM	97.1 FM	Whitesville, Kentucky
WXCR	92.3 FM	New Martinsville, West Virginia
WXCV	95.3 FM	Homosassa Springs, Florida
WXCX	105.7 FM	Siren, Wisconsin
WXCY-FM	103.7 FM	Havre de Grace, Maryland
WXCZ	103.3 FM	Cedar Key, Florida
WXDC	92.9 FM	Berkeley Springs, West Virginia
WXDE	105.9 FM	Lewes, Delaware
WXDJ	106.7 FM	Fort Lauderdale, Florida
WXDM	90.3 FM	Front Royal, Virginia
WXDU	88.7 FM	Durham, North Carolina
WXDX-FM	105.9 FM	Pittsburgh, Pennsylvania
WXEF	97.9 FM	Effingham, Illinois
WXER	104.5 FM	Plymouth, Wisconsin
WXEV	91.1 FM	Bradford, Rhode Island
WXFL	96.1 FM	Florence, Alabama
WXFM-FM	99.3 FM	Mount Zion, Illinois
WXFX	95.1 FM	Prattville, Alabama
WXGL	107.3 FM	St. Petersburg, Florida
WXGM-FM	99.1 FM	Gloucester, Virginia
WXHC	101.5 FM	Homer, New York
WXHD	98.1 FM	Santa Isabel, Puerto Rico
WXHL-FM	89.1 FM	Christiana, Delaware
WXHM	91.9 FM	Middletown, Delaware
WXHT	102.7 FM	Madison, Florida
WXIL	95.1 FM	Elizabeth, West Virginia
WXIS	103.9 FM	Erwin, Tennessee
WXIZ	100.9 FM	Waverly, Ohio
WXJB	99.9 FM	Homosassa, Florida
WXJC-FM	101.1 FM	Cullman, Alabama
WXJK	101.3 FM	Farmville, Virginia
WXJM	88.7 FM	Harrisonburg, Virginia
WXJZ	100.9 FM	Gainesville, Florida
WXKB	103.9 FM	Cape Coral, Florida
WXKC	99.9 FM	Erie, Pennsylvania
WXKE	96.3 FM	Churubusco, Indiana
WXKQ-FM	103.9 FM	Whitesburg, Kentucky
WXKR	94.5 FM	Port Clinton, Ohio
WXKS-FM	107.9 FM	Medford, Massachusetts
WXKT	103.7 FM	Maysville, Georgia
WXKU-FM	92.7 FM	Austin, Indiana
WXKV	90.5 FM	Selmer, Tennessee
WXKW	104.9 FM	Key West, Florida
WXKY	96.3 FM	Stanford, Kentucky
WXKZ-FM	105.3 FM	Prestonsburg, Kentucky
WXLB	91.7 FM	Boonville, New York
WXLC	102.3 FM	Waukegan, Illinois
WXLD	89.7 FM	Lowville, New York
WXLE	105.9 FM	Indian Lake, New York
WXLF	95.3 FM	Hartford, Vermont
WXLG	89.9 FM	North Creek, New York
WXLH	91.3 FM	Blue Mountain Lake, New York
WXLJ	94.1 FM	Whitehall, New York
WXLK	92.3 FM	Roanoke, Virginia
WXLL	91.7 FM	Lake Placid, New York
WXLO	104.5 FM	Fitchburg, Massachusetts
WXLP	96.9 FM	Moline, Illinois
WXLQ	90.5 FM	Bristol, Vermont
WXLR	104.9 FM	Harold, Kentucky
WXLS	88.3 FM	Tupper Lake, New York
WXLT	103.5 FM	Christopher, Illinois
WXLU	88.1 FM	Peru, New York
WXLX	103.7 FM	Lajas, Puerto Rico
WXLY	102.5 FM	North Charleston, South Carolina
WXLZ-FM	107.3 FM	Lebanon, Virginia
WXMA	102.3 FM	Louisville, Kentucky
WXMD	89.7 FM	California, Maryland
WXMF	91.9 FM	Marion, Ohio
WXMG	95.5 FM	Lancaster, Ohio
WXMJ	104.5 FM	Cambridge Springs, Pennsylvania
WXMK	105.9 FM	Dock Junction, Georgia
WXML	90.1 FM	Upper Sandusky, Ohio
WXMT	106.3 FM	Smethport, Pennsylvania
WXMW	89.3 FM	Sycamore, Ohio
WXMX	98.1 FM	Millington, Tennessee
WXMZ	99.9 FM	Hartford, Kentucky
WXNU	106.5 FM	St. Anne, Illinois
WXNY-FM	96.3 FM	New York City
WXOF	96.7 FM	Yankeetown, Florida
WXOS	101.1 FM	East St. Louis, Illinois
WXOU	88.3 FM	Auburn Hills, Michigan
WXPH	88.7 FM	Middletown, Pennsylvania
WXPI	88.5 FM	Jersey Shore, Pennsylvania
WXPJ	91.9 FM	Hackettstown, New Jersey
WXPK	107.1 FM	Briarcliff Manor, New York
WXPL	91.3 FM	Fitchburg, Massachusetts
WXPN	88.5 FM	Philadelphia
WXPR	91.7 FM	Rhinelander, Wisconsin
WXPW	91.9 FM	Wausau, Wisconsin
WXQR-FM	105.5 FM	Jacksonville, North Carolina
WXRA	99.3 FM	Inglis, Florida
WXRB	95.1 FM	Dudley, Massachusetts
WXRC	95.7 FM	Hickory, North Carolina
WXRD	103.9 FM	Crown Point, Indiana
WXRI	91.3 FM	Winston-Salem, North Carolina
WXRR	104.5 FM	Hattiesburg, Mississippi
WXRS-FM	100.5 FM	Swainsboro, Georgia
WXRT	93.1 FM	Chicago
WXRV	92.5 FM	Andover, Massachusetts
WXRX	104.9 FM	Belvidere, Illinois
WXRZ	94.3 FM	Corinth, Mississippi
WXSR	101.5 FM	Quincy, Florida
WXSS	103.7 FM	Wauwatosa, Wisconsin
WXST	99.7 FM	Hollywood, South Carolina
WXTA	97.9 FM	Edinboro, Pennsylvania
WXTB	97.9 FM	Clearwater, Florida
WXTC	88.1 FM	Greenville, Pennsylvania
WXTG-FM	102.1 FM	Virginia Beach, Virginia
WXTK	95.1 FM	West Yarmouth, Massachusetts
WXTP	106.7 FM	North Windham, Maine
WXTQ	105.5 FM	Athens, Ohio
WXTR	89.9 FM	Tappahannock, Virginia
WXTS-FM	88.3 FM	Toledo, Ohio
WXTU	92.5 FM	Philadelphia
WXTY	99.9 FM	Lafayette, Florida
WXUR	92.7 FM	Herkimer, New York
WXUS	102.3 FM	Dunnellon, Florida
WXUT	88.3 FM	Toledo, Ohio
WXVM	104.1 FM	Merrill, Wisconsin
WXVS	90.1 FM	Waycross, Georgia
WXVU	89.1 FM	Villanova, Pennsylvania
WXWX	96.3 FM	Marietta, Mississippi
WXXB	102.9 FM	Delphi, Indiana
WXXC	106.9 FM	Marion, Indiana
WXXF	107.7 FM	Loudonville, Ohio
WXXI-FM	105.9 FM	Rochester, New York
WXXK	100.5 FM	Lebanon, New Hampshire
WXXL	106.7 FM	Tavares, Florida
WXXM	92.1 FM	Sun Prairie, Wisconsin
WXXO	91.5 FM	Rochester, New York
WXXQ	98.5 FM	Freeport, Illinois
WXXS	102.3 FM	Lancaster, New Hampshire
WXXX	95.5 FM	South Burlington, Vermont
WXXY	90.3 FM	Houghton, New York
WXYC	89.3 FM	Chapel Hill, North Carolina
WXYK	105.9 FM	Pascagoula, Mississippi
WXYT-FM	97.1 FM	Detroit, Michigan
WXYX	100.7 FM	Bayamón, Puerto Rico
WXYY	100.1 FM	Rincon, Georgia
WXZC	104.3 FM	Inglis, Florida
WXZO	96.7 FM	Willsboro, New York
WXZQ	100.1 FM	Piketon, Ohio
WXZX	105.7 FM	Hilliard, Ohio
WXZZ	103.3 FM	Georgetown, Kentucky

== WY ==
Callsign	Frequency	City of license
WYAB	103.9 FM	Pocahontas, Mississippi
WYAI	93.7 FM	Scotia, New York
WYAR	88.3 FM	Yarmouth, Maine
WYAS	92.1 FM	Luquillo, Puerto Rico
WYAV	104.1 FM	Myrtle Beach, South Carolina
WYAY	93.7 FM	Georgetown, South Carolina
WYAZ	89.5 FM	Yazoo City, Mississippi
WYBA	90.1 FM	Coldwater, Michigan
WYBB	98.1 FM	Folly Beach, South Carolina
WYBC-FM	94.3 FM	New Haven, Connecticut
WYBF	89.1 FM	Radnor Township, Pennsylvania
WYBH	91.1 FM	Fayetteville, North Carolina
WYBJ	90.7 FM	Newton Grove, North Carolina
WYBK	89.7 FM	Chattanooga, Tennessee
WYBL	98.3 FM	Ashtabula, Ohio
WYBO	92.9 FM	Waynesboro, Georgia
WYBP	90.3 FM	Fort Lauderdale, Florida
WYBQ	88.3 FM	Leesport, Pennsylvania
WYBR	102.3 FM	Big Rapids, Michigan
WYBV	89.9 FM	Wakarusa, Indiana
WYBW	88.7 FM	Key Colony Beach, Florida
WYBX	88.3 FM	Key West, Florida
WYBZ	107.3 FM	Crooksville, Ohio
WYCA	102.3 FM	Crete, Illinois
WYCD	99.5 FM	Detroit, Michigan
WYCE	88.1 FM	Wyoming, Michigan
WYCM	95.7 FM	Attica, Indiana
WYCR	98.5 FM	York-Hanover, Pennsylvania
WYCS	91.5 FM	Yorktown, Virginia
WYCT	98.7 FM	Pensacola, Florida
WYCY	105.3 FM	Hawley, Pennsylvania
WYDA	96.9 FM	Troy, Ohio
WYDE-FM	92.5 FM	Cordova, Alabama
WYDI	90.5 FM	Derry, New Hampshire
WYDL	100.7 FM	Middleton, Tennessee
WYDR	94.3 FM	Neenah-Menasha, Wisconsin
WYDS	93.1 FM	Decatur, Illinois
WYEP-FM	91.3 FM	Pittsburgh, Pennsylvania
WYEZ	100.7 FM	Andrews, South Carolina
WYFA	107.1 FM	Waynesboro, Georgia
WYFB	90.5 FM	Gainesville, Florida
WYFC	95.3 FM	Clinton, Tennessee
WYFD	91.7 FM	Decatur, Alabama
WYFE	88.9 FM	Tarpon Springs, Florida
WYFG	91.1 FM	Gaffney, South Carolina
WYFH	90.7 FM	North Charleston, South Carolina
WYFI	99.7 FM	Norfolk, Virginia
WYFJ	100.1 FM	Ashland, Virginia
WYFK	89.5 FM	Columbus, Georgia
WYFL	92.5 FM	Henderson, North Carolina
WYFM	102.9 FM	Sharon, Pennsylvania
WYFO	91.9 FM	Lakeland, Florida
WYFP	91.9 FM	Harpswell, Maine
WYFQ-FM	93.5 FM	Wadesboro, North Carolina
WYFS	89.5 FM	Savannah, Georgia
WYFT	103.9 FM	Luray, Virginia
WYFU	88.5 FM	Masontown, Pennsylvania
WYFV	88.5 FM	Cayce, South Carolina
WYFW	89.5 FM	Winder, Georgia
WYFY	88.1 FM	Cambridge, Ohio
WYFZ	91.3 FM	Belleview, Florida
WYGB	100.3 FM	Edinburgh, Indiana
WYGC	104.9 FM	High Springs, Florida
WYGE	92.3 FM	London, Kentucky
WYGG	88.1 FM	Asbury Park, New Jersey
WYGO	99.5 FM	Madisonville, Tennessee
WYGS	91.1 FM	Hope, Indiana
WYGY	97.3 FM	Fort Thomas, Kentucky
WYHA	102.9 FM	Grand Rapids, Michigan
WYHH	89.7 FM	Highland Heights, Kentucky
WYHI	99.9 FM	Park Forest, Illinois
WYHN	90.1 FM	Washington, Indiana
WYHR	101.5 FM	Vinton, Virginia
WYHT	105.3 FM	Mansfield, Ohio
WYHW	104.5 FM	Wilmington, North Carolina
WYHX	96.3 FM	Indianapolis, Indiana
WYJB	95.5 FM	Albany, New York
WYJC	90.3 FM	Greenville, Florida
WYJJ	97.7 FM	Trenton, Tennessee
WYKB	105.3 FM	Fernandina Beach, Florida
WYKC	99.1 FM	Whitefield, New Hampshire
WYKL	98.7 FM	Crestline, Ohio
WYKR-FM	101.3 FM	Haverhill, New Hampshire
WYKS	105.3 FM	Gainesville, Florida
WYKT	105.5 FM	Wilmington, Illinois
WYKV	94.5 FM	Ravena, New York
WYKX	104.7 FM	Escanaba, Michigan
WYKY	106.1 FM	Science Hill, Kentucky
WYKZ	98.7 FM	Beaufort, South Carolina
WYLD-FM	98.5 FM	New Orleans, Louisiana
WYLE	95.1 FM	Grove City, Pennsylvania
WYLJ	107.5 FM	Terre Haute, Indiana
WYLK	94.7 FM	Lacombe, Louisiana
WYLR	101.9 FM	Hubbard, Ohio
WYLS	104.9 FM	York, Alabama
WYLV	88.3 FM	Maynardville, Tennessee
WYMG	100.5 FM	Chatham, Illinois
WYMJ	99.5 FM	New Martinsville, West Virginia
WYMK	106.3 FM	Mount Kisco, New York
WYMR	98.3 FM	Culver, Indiana
WYMS	88.9 FM	Milwaukee, Wisconsin
WYMX	99.1 FM	Greenwood, Mississippi
WYMY	101.1 FM	Burlington, North Carolina
WYNA	104.9 FM	Calabash, North Carolina
WYND-FM	95.5 FM	Silver Springs, Florida
WYNG	94.9 FM	Mount Carmel, Illinois
WYNJ	89.5 FM	Blackduck, Minnesota
WYNK-FM	101.5 FM	Baton Rouge, Louisiana
WYNL	94.5 FM	Dunbar, West Virginia
WYNN-FM	106.3 FM	Florence, South Carolina
WYNR	102.5 FM	Waycross, Georgia
WYNS	89.1 FM	Waynesville, Ohio
WYNT	95.9 FM	Caledonia, Ohio
WYNW	92.9 FM	Birnamwood, Wisconsin
WYNZ	100.9 FM	South Portland, Maine
WYOO	101.1 FM	Springfield, Florida
WYOR	88.5 FM	Republic, Ohio
WYOT	102.3 FM	Rochelle, Illinois
WYOY	101.7 FM	Gluckstadt, Mississippi
WYPA	89.5 FM	Cherry Hill, New Jersey
WYPF	88.1 FM	Frederick, Maryland
WYPL	89.3 FM	Memphis, Tennessee
WYPM	93.3 FM	Chambersburg, Pennsylvania
WYPO	106.9 FM	Ocean City, Maryland
WYPR	88.1 FM	Baltimore, Maryland
WYQE	92.9 FM	Naguabo, Puerto Rico
WYQQ	90.1 FM	Charlton, Massachusetts
WYQS	90.5 FM	Mars Hill, North Carolina
WYRA	98.5 FM	Confluence, Pennsylvania
WYRB	106.3 FM	Genoa, Illinois
WYRD-FM	98.9 FM	Spartanburg, South Carolina
WYRK	106.5 FM	Buffalo, New York
WYRO	98.7 FM	McArthur, Ohio
WYRQ-FM	92.1 FM	Little Falls, Minnesota
WYRR	88.9 FM	Lakewood, New York
WYRS	90.7 FM	Manahawkin, New Jersey
WYRX-FM	94.3 FM	Plymouth, Indiana
WYRY	104.9 FM	Hinsdale, New Hampshire
WYSA	88.5 FM	Wauseon, Ohio
WYSC	102.7 FM	McRae, Georgia
WYSM	89.3 FM	Lima, Ohio
WYSO	91.3 FM	Yellow Springs, Ohio
WYSP	88.1 FM	Dushore, Pennsylvania
WYSS	99.5 FM	Sault Ste. Marie, Michigan
WYSU	88.5 FM	Youngstown, Ohio
WYSX	96.7 FM	Morristown, New York
WYSZ	89.3 FM	Maumee, Ohio
WYTE	106.5 FM	Marshfield, Wisconsin
WYTF	88.7 FM	Indianola, Mississippi
WYTJ	89.3 FM	Linton, Indiana
WYTK	93.9 FM	Rogersville, Alabama
WYTL	91.7 FM	Wyomissing, Pennsylvania
WYTM-FM	105.5 FM	Fayetteville, Tennessee
WYTN	91.7 FM	Youngstown, Ohio
WYTR	88.1 FM	Robbins, North Carolina
WYTT	99.5 FM	Emporia, Virginia
WYTZ-FM	99.9 FM	Benton Harbor, Michigan
WYUM	101.7 FM	Mount Vernon, Georgia
WYUR	103.7 FM	Gilman, Illinois
WYUU	92.5 FM	Safety Harbor, Florida
WYVK	92.1 FM	Middleport, Ohio
WYVL	88.5 FM	Youngsville, Pennsylvania
WYVM	90.9 FM	Sheboygan, Wisconsin
WYVN	92.7 FM	Saugatuck, Michigan
WYVS	96.5 FM	Speculator, New York
WYWL	88.9 FM	Harvard, Illinois
WYXA	90.1 FM	Clarksburg, West Virginia
WYXB	105.7 FM	Indianapolis, Indiana
WYXL	97.3 FM	Ithaca, New York
WYXR	91.7 FM	Memphis, Tennessee
WYXX	97.7 FM	Goshen, Indiana
WYXY	99.1 FM	Savoy, Illinois
WYYD	107.9 FM	Amherst, Virginia
WYYS	106.1 FM	Streator, Illinois
WYYU	104.5 FM	Dalton, Georgia
WYYX	97.7 FM	Bonifay, Florida
WYYY	94.5 FM	Syracuse, New York
WYZB	105.5 FM	Mary Esther, Florida
WYZX	88.3 FM	East Falmouth, Massachusetts

== WZ ==
Callsign	Frequency	City of license
WZAC-FM	92.5 FM	Danville, West Virginia
WZAD	97.3 FM	Wurtsboro, New York
WZAE	93.3 FM	Wadley, Georgia
WZAI	94.3 FM	Brewster, Massachusetts
WZAK	93.1 FM	Cleveland, Ohio
WZAR	101.9 FM	Ponce, Puerto Rico
WZAX	99.3 FM	Nashville, North Carolina
WZBB	99.9 FM	Stanleytown, Virginia
WZBC	90.3 FM	Newton, Massachusetts
WZBD	92.7 FM	Berne, Indiana
WZBF	96.9 FM	Ridgebury, Pennsylvania
WZBG	97.3 FM	Litchfield, Connecticut
WZBH	93.5 FM	Millsboro, Delaware
WZBL	88.1 FM	Barnegat Light, New Jersey
WZBN	105.5 FM	Camilla, Georgia
WZBQ	94.1 FM	Carrollton, Alabama
WZBT	91.1 FM	Gettysburg, Pennsylvania
WZBY	92.7 FM	Grand Portage, Minnesota
WZBZ	99.3 FM	Pleasantville, New Jersey
WZCA	91.7 FM	Quebradillas, Puerto Rico
WZCB	106.7 FM	Dublin, Ohio
WZCO	89.9 FM	Chadbourn, North Carolina
WZCP	89.3 FM	Chillicothe, Ohio
WZCR	93.5 FM	Hudson, New York
WZDA	103.9 FM	Beavercreek, Ohio
WZDG	88.5 FM	Scotts Hill, North Carolina
WZDM	92.1 FM	Vincennes, Indiana
WZDQ	102.3 FM	Humboldt, Tennessee
WZDV	92.1 FM	Amherst, New York
WZEB	101.7 FM	Ocean View, Delaware
WZEE	104.1 FM	Madison, Wisconsin
WZET	92.1 FM	Hormigueros, Puerto Rico
WZEV	90.5 FM	Lineville, Alabama
WZEW	92.1 FM	Fairhope, Alabama
WZEZ	104.9 FM	Balsam Lake, Wisconsin
WZFJ	104.3 FM	Breezy Point, Minnesota
WZFL	93.5 FM	Islamorada, Florida
WZFM	101.3 FM	Narrows, Virginia
WZFR	104.5 FM	Eastpoint, Florida
WZFT	104.3 FM	Baltimore, Maryland
WZFX	99.1 FM	Whiteville, North Carolina
WZGC	92.9 FM	Atlanta
WZGL	88.1 FM	Charleston, Illinois
WZGO	91.1 FM	Aurora, North Carolina
WZHD	97.1 FM	Canaseraga, New York
WZHT	105.7 FM	Troy, Alabama
WZID	95.7 FM	Manchester, New Hampshire
WZIM	99.5 FM	Lexington, Illinois
WZIN	104.3 FM	Charlotte Amalie, United States Virgin Islands
WZIP	88.1 FM	Akron, Ohio
WZIQ	106.5 FM	Smithville, Georgia
WZIS-FM	90.7 FM	Terre Haute, Indiana
WZIV	90.7 FM	Princeton, Illinois
WZJR	91.7 FM	Portland, Indiana
WZJS	100.7 FM	Banner Elk, North Carolina
WZJZ	100.1 FM	Port Charlotte, Florida
WZKB	94.3 FM	Wallace, North Carolina
WZKC	103.1 FM	Royalton, Vermont
WZKL	91.7 FM	Woodstock, Illinois
WZKR	103.3 FM	Collinsville, Mississippi
WZKS	104.1 FM	Union, Mississippi
WZKT	97.7 FM	Walnut Creek, North Carolina
WZKV	90.7 FM	Dyersburg, Tennessee
WZKX	107.9 FM	Bay St. Louis, Mississippi
WZLA-FM	92.9 FM	Abbeville, South Carolina
WZLB	103.1 FM	Valparaiso, Florida
WZLC	88.9 FM	Summerville, South Carolina
WZLD	106.3 FM	Petal, Mississippi
WZLF	107.1 FM	Bellows Falls, Vermont
WZLK	107.5 FM	Virgie, Kentucky
WZLO	103.1 FM	Dover-Foxcroft, Maine
WZLQ	98.5 FM	Tupelo, Mississippi
WZLR	95.3 FM	Xenia, Ohio
WZLT	99.3 FM	Lexington, Tennessee
WZLV	90.7 FM	Cape Charles, Virginia
WZLX	100.7 FM	Boston, Massachusetts
WZLY	91.5 FM	Wellesley, Massachusetts
WZMB	91.3 FM	Greenville, North Carolina
WZMJ	93.1 FM	Batesburg, South Carolina
WZMT	93.3 FM	Ponce, Puerto Rico
WZMV	89.1 FM	Mohrsville, Pennsylvania
WZMX	93.7 FM	Hartford, Connecticut
WZNB	88.5 FM	New Bern, North Carolina
WZNE	94.1 FM	Brighton, New York
WZNF	95.3 FM	Lumberton, Mississippi
WZNJ	106.5 FM	Demopolis, Alabama
WZNL	94.3 FM	Norway, Michigan
WZNN	96.1 FM	Stamping Ground, Kentucky
WZNP	89.3 FM	Newark, Ohio
WZNS	96.5 FM	Fort Walton Beach, Florida
WZNT	93.7 FM	San Juan, Puerto Rico
WZNX	106.7 FM	Sullivan, Illinois
WZOE-FM	98.1 FM	Princeton, Illinois
WZOK	97.5 FM	Rockford, Illinois
WZOL	98.9 FM	Vieques, Puerto Rico
WZOM	105.7 FM	Defiance, Ohio
WZOO-FM	102.5 FM	Edgewood, Ohio
WZOR	94.7 FM	Mishicot, Wisconsin
WZOS	104.7 FM	Berlin, Wisconsin
WZOZ	103.1 FM	Oneonta, New York
WZPE	90.1 FM	Bath, North Carolina
WZPL	99.5 FM	Greenfield, Indiana
WZPN	96.5 FM	Farmington, Illinois
WZPR	92.3 FM	Nags Head, North Carolina
WZPW	92.3 FM	Peoria, Illinois
WZQQ	97.9 FM	Hyden, Kentucky
WZRD	88.3 FM	Chicago
WZRG	91.9 FM	Kulpmont, Pennsylvania
WZRH	92.3 FM	LaPlace, Louisiana
WZRI	89.3 FM	Spring Lake, North Carolina
WZRL	98.3 FM	Plainfield, Indiana
WZRM	97.7 FM	Brockton, Massachusetts
WZRN	90.5 FM	Norlina, North Carolina
WZRR	99.5 FM	Birmingham, Alabama
WZRT	97.1 FM	Rutland, Vermont
WZRU	90.1 FM	Garysburg, North Carolina
WZRV	95.3 FM	Front Royal, Virginia
WZRX-FM	107.5 FM	Fort Shawnee, Ohio
WZSN	103.5 FM	Greenwood, South Carolina
WZSP	105.3 FM	Nocatee, Florida
WZSR	105.5 FM	Woodstock, Illinois
WZST-FM	100.9 FM	Westover, West Virginia
WZTC	104.5 FM	Traverse City, Michigan
WZTF	102.9 FM	Scranton, South Carolina
WZTG	91.7 FM	Clayton, Georgia
WZTH	91.1 FM	Tusculum, Tennessee
WZTK	105.7 FM	Alpena, Michigan
WZTN	89.9 FM	Cornersville, Tennessee
WZTR	104.3 FM	Dahlonega, Georgia
WZTU	94.9 FM	Miami Beach, Florida
WZTZ	101.1 FM	Elba, Alabama
WZUM-FM	88.1 FM	Bethany, West Virginia
WZUN-FM	102.1 FM	Phoenix, New York
WZUP	97.5 FM	Washington, North Carolina
WZUS	100.9 FM	Macon, Illinois
WZUU	92.5 FM	Mattawan, Michigan
WZVA	103.5 FM	Marion, Virginia
WZVK	89.3 FM	Glasgow, Kentucky
WZVL	103.7 FM	Philo, Ohio
WZVN	107.1 FM	Lowell, Indiana
WZVV	102.1 FM	Dexter, Maine
WZWG	91.7 FM	West Grove, Pennsylvania
WZWP	89.5 FM	West Union, Ohio
WZWW	93.7 FM	Boalsburg, Pennsylvania
WZWZ	92.5 FM	Kokomo, Indiana
WZXB	90.5 FM	Bechtelsville, Pennsylvania
WZXE	88.3 FM	East Nottingham, Pennsylvania
WZXH	91.7 FM	Hagerstown, Maryland
WZXL	100.7 FM	Wildwood, New Jersey
WZXM	88.1 FM	Harrisburg, Pennsylvania
WZXN	90.1 FM	Newburg, Pennsylvania
WZXQ	88.3 FM	Chambersburg, Pennsylvania
WZXR	99.3 FM	South Williamsport, Pennsylvania
WZXV	99.7 FM	Palmyra, New York
WZXX	88.5 FM	Lawrenceburg, Tennessee
WZXY	90.7 FM	Spring Grove, Pennsylvania
WZYK	94.7 FM	Clinton, Kentucky
WZYP	104.3 FM	Athens, Alabama
WZYQ	101.7 FM	Mound Bayou, Mississippi
WZYZ	90.1 FM	Spencer, Tennessee
WZZD	88.1 FM	Warwick, Pennsylvania
WZZH	90.9 FM	Honesdale, Pennsylvania
WZZK-FM	104.7 FM	Birmingham, Alabama
WZZL	106.7 FM	Reidland, Kentucky
WZZN	97.7 FM	Union Grove, Alabama
WZZO	95.1 FM	Bethlehem, Pennsylvania
WZZP	97.5 FM	Hopkinsville, Kentucky
WZZR	92.1 FM	West Palm Beach, Florida
WZZT	102.7 FM	Morrison, Illinois
WZZU	97.9 FM	Lynchburg, Virginia
WZZY	98.3 FM	Winchester, Indiana
WZZZ	107.5 FM	Portsmouth, Ohio

== See also ==
- North American call sign
