= WWDW =

- Alberta, Virginia; United States
- Broadcast area: Southside
- Frequency: 107.7 MHz
- Branding: 107.7 The Lake

Programming
- Format: Adult hits
- Affiliations: Compass Media Networks

Ownership
- Owner: John Byrne; (Byrne Acquisition Group, LLC)
- Sister stations: WDLZ, WPTM, WSMY, WTRG, WWDR, WYTT

History
- First air date: 2000
- Former call signs: WSMY-FM (2001–2005)
- Former frequencies: 103.1 MHz (2001–2009)
- Call sign meaning: nod to nearby WWDE

Technical information
- Licensing authority: FCC
- Facility ID: 7305
- Class: A
- ERP: 2,200 watts
- HAAT: 163 meters (535 ft)
- Transmitter coordinates: 36°52′2.0″N 77°53′31.0″W

Links
- Public license information: Public file; LMS
- Webcast: WWDW Webstream
- Website: 1077lakefm.com

WWDW is an adult hits formatted broadcast radio station licensed to Alberta, Virginia, serving the Southside. WWDW is owned and operated by John Byrne, through licensee Byrne Acquisition Group, LLC. The station brands itself as "107.7 The Lake".

== History ==
WSMY-FM signed on in December 2000, originally owned by MainQuad Broadcasting and broadcasting from a tower immediately outside the Alberta town limits. It broadcast black gospel music in simulcast with WSMY (1400 AM) in Weldon, North Carolina.

103.1 MHz's second harmonic (206.2 MHz) lies within television channel 12 (204–210 MHz), which was used by WWBT in Richmond. The station and the town government of Alberta were deluged with interference complaints. WSMY-FM signed off almost immediately. However, after its transmitter was inspected and determined not to be causing spurious interference, operation resumed on July 23, 2001. Interference complaints also resumed, and the mayor of Alberta personally informed ownership she would prefer if the station did not operate. WSMY-FM went off the air again in August, blaming widespread local use of amplifiers to receive the 55-mile-distant television station.

MainQuad applied to relocate WSMY-FM to Garysburg, North Carolina to serve the Rocky Mount area. It proposed allocating 107.7 FM to Alberta in its stead and building a new station. However, a Garysburg-based group filed a competing application for 103.1 FM (now WLQC in Sharpsburg), and the Federal Communications Commission (FCC) opted for the simpler solution; it granted that application, modified WSMY-FM's license to operate on 107.7, and required the ultimate permittee of the Garysburg station to reimburse WSMY-FM for the frequency change.

All of MainQuad's stations were sold to First Media Radio in 2003 and WSMY-FM flipped to adult contemporary, with a branding change to "3WD" WWDW following in 2005. The frequency changeover, which could not take place until the new 103.1 allocation was built out, happened on March 17, 2009.

On October 25, 2017, WWDW changed its format to variety hits, branded as "107.7 The Lake". On January 2, 2019, the format changed once again, this time to classic rock and a new branding, "107.7 Rock City". In addition, WWDW also picked up Two Guys Named Chris, a syndicated program based out of WKRR in Greensboro, North Carolina.
