= WYTT =

- Emporia, Virginia; United States
- Broadcast area: Emporia, Virginia; Greensville County, Virginia
- Frequency: 99.5 MHz
- Branding: "99.5 & 105.9 Jamz"

Programming
- Format: Urban adult contemporary

Ownership
- Owner: John Byrne; (Byrne Acquisition Group, LLC)
- Sister stations: WDLZ, WPTM, WSMY, WTRG, WWDR, WWDW

History
- First air date: 2003

Technical information
- Licensing authority: FCC
- Facility ID: 78379
- Class: A
- ERP: 1,270 watts
- HAAT: 152.7 meters
- Transmitter coordinates: 36°39′20.0″N 77°34′22.0″W
- Repeater: 1080 WWDR (Murfreesboro)

Links
- Public license information: Public file; LMS
- Webcast: WYTT Webstream
- Website: WYTT Online

WYTT is an urban adult contemporary formatted broadcast radio station licensed to Emporia, Virginia, serving Emporia and Greensville County, Virginia. WYTT is owned and operated by John Byrne, through licensee Byrne Acquisition Group, LLC. WYTT is simulcast on translator W290DE 105.9 in Murfreesboro, North Carolina.

== History ==
WYTT signed on in 2002 and changed calls to WLGQ the following year. It returned to the WYTT calls in 2005.

Former logo

== Ownership ==
In June 2003, then-WLGQ was sold to First Media by MainQuad Communications Inc. as part of a nine station deal with a total sale price of $11.35 million.

Effective December 20, 2019, Byrne Acquisition Group acquired WYTT, six sister stations, and two translators from First Media for $3.4 million.
