= WFUR =

WFUR may refer to:

- WFUR (AM), a radio station (1570 AM) licensed to serve Grand Rapids, Michigan, United States
- WYHA, a radio station (102.9 FM) licensed to serve Grand Rapids, Michigan, which held the call sign WFUR-FM from 1960 to 2020
