= WBT =

WBT may refer to:

- WBT (AM), a radio station, Charlotte, North Carolina, US
- WBT-FM, a radio station, Charlotte, North Carolina, US
- WMXG, a radio station, Chester, South Carolina, US that used the WBT-FM call letters from 1995 to 2025
- Warrington's Own Buses, a bus company in Warrington, England formerly known as Warrington Borough Transport
- Web-based training
- Wet-bulb temperature
