= WSIB =

WSIB may refer to:

- Workplace Safety & Insurance Board, worker's compensation insurer in Ontario, Canada
- WSIB-LP, a low-power radio station (106.7 FM) licensed to serve Athens, Ohio, United States; see List of radio stations in Ohio
- WWGM, a radio station (93.9 FM) licensed to serve Selmer, Tennessee, United States, which held the call sign WSIB from 1989 to 2018
