= YesFM =

YesFM may refer to any of three FM radio stations in the United States:

- WYSS, in Sault Ste. Marie, Michigan (99.5 FM)
- WYSX, in Morristown, New York (96.7 FM)
- WYSZ, in Toledo, Ohio (89.3 FM)
