= WMXG =

- Chester, South Carolina; United States
- Broadcast area: Charlotte metropolitan area
- Frequency: 99.3 MHz (HD Radio)

Programming
- Language: English
- Format: Christian talk and teaching

Ownership
- Owner: Augusta Radio Fellowship; (Augusta Radio Fellowship Institute, Inc.)

History
- First air date: July 28, 1969
- Former call signs: WCMJ (1969–1978); WDZK (1978–1993); WBZK-FM (1993–1995); WBT-FM (1995-2025)
- Call sign meaning: Mix (previous format)

Technical information
- Licensing authority: FCC
- Facility ID: 10764
- Class: C3
- ERP: 7,700 watts
- HAAT: 182.2 meters (598 ft)
- Transmitter coordinates: 34°47′30.5″N 81°16′5.3″W

Links
- Public license information: Public file; LMS
- Website: https://www.gnnradio.com

WMXG (99.3 MHz) is an FM radio station licensed to Chester, South Carolina, that primarily serves the southwestern region of the Charlotte metropolitan area. The station is owned by Augusta Radio Fellowship. The format is Christian talk and teaching from the Good News Network.

WMXG was first licensed, as WCMJ, on December 1, 1969. It broadcasts on 99.3 MHz with an effective radiated power (ERP) of 7,700 watts, using a tower nearly 600 feet (180 meters) in height above average terrain (HAAT). The transmitter is located 40 miles (64 km) southwest of Charlotte, off Armenia Road in Chester. The station is also authorized to broadcast using the digital HD Radio format.

== History ==
=== Early years ===
The station first went on the air in on July 28, 1969, as WCMJ, owned by the York-Clover Broadcasting Company. From 1978 to 1993, the station used the call letters WDZK and was known on the air as "K99" playing a format that, today would be considered adult top 40.

=== WBT simulcast ===
Despite its clear-channel status that allows it to reach most of the eastern half of North America at night, WBT (AM)'s nighttime signal is spotty at best in some parts of the Charlotte metropolitan area (particularly the western portion) because it operates with a directional antenna at night to avoid interfering with KFAB in Omaha, Nebraska, which also operates on 1110 kHz. To improve its local nighttime coverage, in 1947, WBT began operating a synchronous booster transmitter, located in Shelby, however use of this booster ended in the early 1960s.

In 1995, WBT's then-owner Jefferson-Pilot bought WBZK to provide a better signal to the western part of the market at night. At this time, the call letters were changed to WBT-FM. (Note: In 1947, an FM sister station at 99.9 MHz was put on the air. That station was discontinued in the mid-1950s. The current WBT-FM, at 107.9, held the WBT-FM call letters from 1962 to 1978, and again from 1989 to 1995.)

Studios were located at One Julian Price Place on West Morehead Street, just west of Uptown Charlotte, co-located with the city's CBS affiliate WBTV, which previously had common ownership.

=== Sale to Entercom ===
On July 19, 2016, Greater Media announced that it would merge with Beasley Media Group. Because Beasley already had the maximum number of stations in the Charlotte market with five FM's and two AM's, WBT-AM-FM and WLNK were spun off to a divestiture trust, eventually going to a permanent buyer. On October 18, 2016, Entercom announced that it would purchase WBT AM/FM and WLNK, plus WFNZ. Upon the completion of the Greater/Beasley merger on November 1, Entercom began operating the stations via a time brokerage agreement, which lasted until the sale was consummated on January 6, 2017.

=== Sale to Urban One ===
On November 5, 2020, Urban One agreed to a station swap with Entercom in which they would swap ownership of four stations in Philadelphia, St. Louis and Washington D.C. to Entercom in exchange for their cluster of Charlotte stations, including WBT and WBT-FM. As part of the terms of the deal, Urban One took over operations via a local marketing agreement on November 23. The swap was consummated on April 20, 2021.

=== Change to Mix ===
On December 11, 2025, the simulcast of WBT (AM) moved to 107.9 FM, which lasted until January 8, at which time the WBT programming continued only at the new FM location. The hot adult contemporary format "Mix" and WLNK call letters moved to 100.9 FM while 99.3 became a simulcast with new call letters WMXG.

=== Christian radio ===
On March 30, 2026, Urban One announced that it would sell WLNK and WMXG to the Bible Broadcasting Network and Augusta Radio Fellowship Institute respectively, which would result in the end of the hot AC format, as both owners focus on Christian formats. The sale closed on June 1, 2026, at midnight, with the final song being "Killer Queen" by 5 Seconds of Summer.
