= WJAK =

Urban contemporary radio station in Jackson, Tennessee, United States

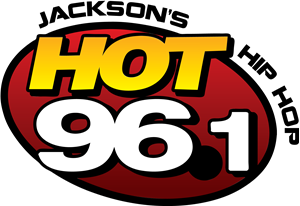
- Jackson, Tennessee; United States
- Frequency: 1460 kHz
- Branding: HOT 96.1

Programming
- Format: Urban contemporary

Ownership
- Owner: Thomas Media; (Southern Stone Communications, LLC)
- Sister stations: WFKX, WHHM-FM, WWYN, WZDQ

History
- First air date: December 13, 1954; 71 years ago
- Former call signs: WHMO (1991–1991); WQCR (1991–1996)
- Call sign meaning: W JAcKson

Technical information
- Licensing authority: FCC
- Facility ID: 54035
- Class: D
- Power: 1,000 watts day 105 watts night
- Transmitter coordinates: 35°38′37.00″N 88°46′24.00″W
- Repeater: 96.1 W241BV (Jackson)

Links
- Public license information: Public file; LMS
- Website: www.hot961.com

WJAK (1460 AM) is a radio station broadcasting an Urban contemporary format. It is licensed to Jackson, Tennessee, United States. The station is currently owned by Thomas Media.

== History ==
The station was assigned the callsign WHMO on May 15, 1991. On June 14, 1991, the station changed its call sign to WQCR, and on May 17, 1996 to the current WJAK.
