= WWJM =

- New Lexington, Ohio; United States
- Broadcast area: Zanesville, Ohio
- Frequency: 105.9 MHz
- Branding: 105.9 and 94.5 The Mix

Programming
- Format: Hot adult contemporary
- Affiliations: ABC Radio, Westwood One

Ownership
- Owner: Perry County Broadcasting Co.

History
- First air date: May 1, 1978

Technical information
- Licensing authority: FCC
- Facility ID: 52322
- Class: A
- ERP: 1,700 watts
- HAAT: 191 meters
- Transmitter coordinates: 39°46′37.00″N 82°9′54.00″W
- Repeater: 94.5 W233AK (Zanesville)

Links
- Public license information: Public file; LMS
- Website: wwjm.com

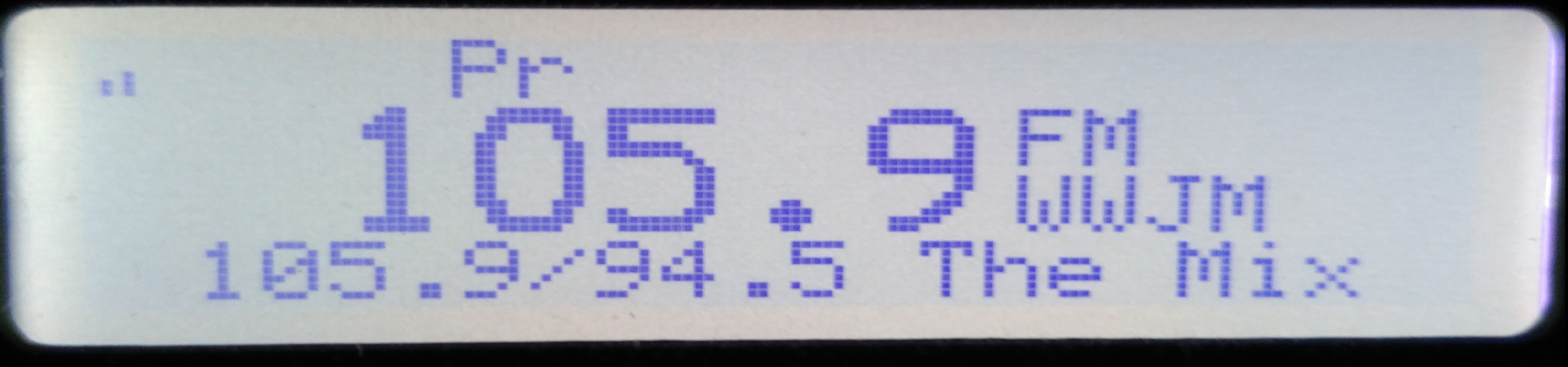
WWJM on a SPARC HD Radio with RDS.

WWJM (105.9 FM) is a radio station currently owned by Perry County Broadcasting Co. It broadcasts a hot adult contemporary format, featuring a number of syndicated female-oriented lifestyle talk shows.

Licensed to New Lexington, Ohio, WWJM, like many stations in the region, also targets listeners in the nearby Zanesville, Ohio area. It maintains an FM translator, W233AK (94.5 FM), in Zanesville itself.

Though WWJM's overall music format is considered Hot Adult Contemporary, the station carries a weekday schedule of lifestyle-oriented talk shows syndicated by Dial Global. The shows, produced by WLNK in Charlotte, North Carolina, include Bob and Sheri and Matt and Ramona.

== History ==
WWJM signed on the air May 1, 1978. Programming was AC/country from sign on (6am) until 3pm when the music became "Top 40". In 1979 The country Music was dumped and top 40 was played until 9pm.the late evening music was "AOR". Joe Hill AKA "David Barnes" was program director at that time. Joe was PM drive host at KFLR in Phoenix, Arizona in 2002.
