= WYFI =

Bible Broadcasting Network radio station in Norfolk, Virginia

- Norfolk, Virginia; United States
- Broadcast area: Hampton Roads; Northeastern North Carolina
- Frequency: 99.7 MHz

Programming
- Format: Christian
- Network: Bible Broadcasting Network

Ownership
- Owner: Bible Broadcasting Network

History
- First air date: February 15, 1959 (Note: The station was off the air from October to November 1959 and February 28, 1964, to October 2, 1971.))
- Call sign meaning: "Where You Find Inspiration"

Technical information
- Licensing authority: FCC
- Facility ID: 5143
- Class: B
- Power: 50,000 watts
- HAAT: 139 meters (456 ft)
- Transmitter coordinates: 36°49′40.4″N 76°15′6.5″W

Links
- Public license information: Public file; LMS
- Webcast: Listen live
- Website: WYFI Online

WYFI (99.7 FM) is a religious formatted broadcast radio station licensed to Norfolk, Virginia. WYFI serves Hampton Roads in Virginia and Northeastern North Carolina. WYFI is owned and operated by Bible Broadcasting Network.

== History ==
=== The pre-BBN years ===
WYFI first came to air on February 15, 1959, under the ownership of Electronic Research, Inc., owned by two employees of WAVY-TV. The station's first incarnation on air was short-lived, lasting only until October. Ambert Dail, the radio columnist for the Daily Press, said it had lasted "on faith and LPs" and that it had ended in an "Edsel-like burn".

WYFI was back on the air by late November, in no small part thanks to having been sold to WBOF radio of Virginia Beach. The purchase was made official in early 1960, with WYFI selling for a mere $7,000. WBOF-WYFI was sold later in 1960 to Washington, D.C., attorney Temple Seay for $260,000. In 1961, WBOF and WYFI both affiliated with the Mutual Broadcasting System, giving the network one of its first separately programmed FM affiliates.

=== Seven years off the air ===
WBOF filed to sell WYFI in 1963 to five local businessmen for $53,100. The sale, however, was never closed. On February 28, 1964, WBOF and WYFI received permission to remain off the air, authorization that would be continuously extended for WYFI for years. Roy Marsh resigned from the Hampton Roads Educational Television Authority to become the receiver for Metro-WBOF, Inc., the licensee of the two radio stations. (He would be replaced in 1966 by Andre Evans.)

The WBOF stations went up for auction in 1964. The winning bid for WYFI, at $36,000, came from Continental Broadcasting, owners of WRAP. (The AM station, by comparison, fetched $136,000.) Continental also owned four additional radio stations outside of Norfolk, and it would be an action involving one of them that would ultimately kill its chances at acquiring the station. In June 1965, the Federal Communications Commission designated the license renewal of Continental's WNJR in Newark, New Jersey, for hearing, over a time-brokerage agreement case in which falsification and misrepresentations were involved. The next month, the FCC deferred action on the sale to Continental on the result of the Newark hearing. While a hearing examiner initially slapped WNJR with a short-term renewal, the FCC voted 4-1 in November 1968 to deny its renewal application altogether.

=== Return to the air and BBN operation ===
The summer of 1969 brought a new party to the long-running WYFI proceedings. On June 26, Christian Communications, Inc., filed an application to build a new radio station on WYFI's frequency. Christian Communications, headed by Lowell W. Davey, had previously attempted to buy another Norfolk FM outlet, WRVC. That November, receiver Evans filed to relocate the WYFI transmitter and increase its effective radiated power to 50,000 watts from the 11,500 it had used; the FCC initially approved the application, but set it aside when Christian Communications petitioned to deny the grant. Receiver Evans and Christian Communications ultimately reached a settlement agreement: in July 1970, Christian Communications agreed to buy WYFI, with the 1964 sale application to Continental and the 1969 facility change dismissed as part of the settlement. The new owners then were approved for their own grant to increase power to 50,000 watts. The facility's construction had its own challenges; none of the equipment ordered to put WYFI back on the air worked out of the box.

After more than seven years of silence, WYFI returned to the air at 5 p.m. on October 2, 1971. It would be the first station in a series. In 1974, the newly renamed Bible Broadcasting Network acquired its second outlet, WHPE in High Point, North Carolina.

Although BBN operates 24/7, a technical issue with the satellite reception of BBN in May of 1998 forced WYFL to run limited local programs for only 15 hours each day until the issue was fixed.
