= The Matt and Ramona Show =

- Genre: Talk, Entertainment, Comedy, Advice
- Running time: 4 hours (6-10 AM ET)
- Country of origin: United States
- Home station: WLNK
- Starring: Matt Harris; Ramona Holloway
- Produced by: Kary Bowser Jr.
- Original release: 2001 – Present
- Podcast: The Matt and Ramona Show

The Matt and Ramona Show is a syndicated U.S. radio program hosted by Matt Harris and Ramona Holloway at radio station WLNK in Charlotte, North Carolina. The show is owned by Greater Media and runs live on over 60 nationwide affiliates from 6 to 10 AM ET.

The Matt and Ramona Show is designed for contemporary music stations with a mix of music and conversations targeting a 25- to 44-year-old audience. Each hour contains two to three songs.

== History ==
In March 2000, Matt Harris teamed up with partner Ramona Holloway at WNVZ in Virginia Beach. The next year, The Matt and Ramona Show was launched on Charlotte’s WLNK. In the first two years, the team had gone from number eight to number one with age 25-54 adult demographic, doubling the average commercial rate in the time slot.

After 20 years as an afternoon show, The Matt and Ramona Show moved to mornings in May 2021.

== The Cast ==
=== Matt ===
Matt Harris was born in Doylestown, Pennsylvania and graduated from Lock Haven University. He has been on radio since 1983 and is a columnist for a parenting magazine called Little Ones. He has a wife, Amy, and 2 daughters, Addison and Avery.

=== Ramona ===
Ramona Holloway was born in Oberlin, Ohio, but raised in Somerset, New Jersey. She attended Penn State University. Aside from The Matt and Ramona Show, Ramona also hosts "The Satisfied Life" along with Pam Stone and Sharon Decker.

=== Doc ===
Kary "Doc" Bowser Jr. is the co-producer of The Matt and Ramona Show. Although born in Burlington, New Jersey, Bowser was raised in the South from the age of 4. Bowser was an intern with The Matt and Ramona Show before joining the show as a producer.

=== Wheezy ===
Louise "Wheezy" Holloway is Ramona's mom. Louise is a retired school teacher and hosts the “Wide World of Wheezy” segment on The Matt and Ramona Show. A running gag on the show is Wheezy's cougar-like behavior.

=== Pete ===
Pete "The Angry Pitbull" Kaliner was born in a West Islip, New York. He attended Winthrop University in Rock Hill, South Carolina. Kaliner has won several industry awards from the Associated Press and the Radio-Television News Directors Association of the Carolinas - which named him the 2006 North Carolina Journalist of the Year.

== Frequent Guests ==
- Matt Bean is a senior editor for Men's Health magazine.
- Jane Madey is an astrologist.
- Chris Miller fills in for Pete Kaliner doing the news when Pete is out.

== Awards ==
The Matt and Ramona Show has twice been honored by the critics and readers of Creative Loafing newspaper as Charlotte's best afternoon show. Ramona was also named Charlotte’s Best Radio Personality by Charlotte Magazine in 2003 and 2008. Ramona also won the Gracie Award for radio comedy in 2009.

== Features ==
The Matt and Ramona Show offers 'themed days':

- Tirade Tuesday features listeners phoning in and venting their frustrations.
- Wide World of Wheezy on Wednesdays features Ramona's mom, Wheezy, giving tips and advice on a range of topics.
- Intimate Issues on Thursdays features listeners sharing their opinions on topics involving intimacy and romance.
