= WHHM-FM =

Adult contemporary radio station in Henderson, Tennessee, United States

- Henderson, Tennessee; United States
- Broadcast area: Jackson, Tennessee
- Frequency: 107.7 MHz
- Branding: Star 107.7

Programming
- Format: Adult contemporary
- Affiliations: Premiere Networks; Westwood One

Ownership
- Owner: Southern Stone Communications, LLC
- Sister stations: WFKX; WJAK; WWYN; WZDQ

History
- First air date: 1990
- Call sign meaning: "Henderson's Hit Music"

Technical information
- Licensing authority: FCC
- Facility ID: 10766
- Class: C2
- ERP: 50,000 watts
- HAAT: 140 meters (460 ft)
- Transmitter coordinates: 35°27′23.3″N 88°37′36.2″W

Links
- Public license information: Public file; LMS
- Webcast: Listen live
- Website: www.star1077.com

WHHM-FM (107.7 MHz, "Star 107.7") is a radio station broadcasting an adult contemporary music format. Licensed to Henderson, Tennessee, United States, the station is owned by Thomas Radio, LLC.

In 2015, the station transitioned from an adult contemporary music format to a hot AC music mix. As of January 2021, though, the station had returned to its former mainstream AC format.
