= WYFN =

Bible Broadcasting Network radio station in Nashville, Tennessee

- Nashville, Tennessee; United States
- Broadcast area: Nashville metropolitan area
- Frequency: 980 kHz

Programming
- Format: Conservative religious
- Network: Bible Broadcasting Network

Ownership
- Owner: Bible Broadcasting Network

History
- First air date: January 7, 1927
- Former call signs: WSIX (1927–1991)
- Former frequencies: 1200 kHz (1927–1928); 1210 kHz (1928–1941); 1240 kHz (1941–1942)
- Call sign meaning: Where You Find New Life

Technical information
- Licensing authority: FCC
- Facility ID: 8725
- Class: B
- Power: 5,000 watts
- Transmitter coordinates: 36°12′25″N 86°40′25″W

Links
- Public license information: Public file; LMS
- Webcast: Listen live
- Website: bbn1.bbnradio.org/english/stations-list/wyfn-nashville-tn-980-am/

WYFN (980 AM) is a radio station serving the Nashville, Tennessee area with a conservative religious radio format. It is a Bible Broadcasting Network (BBN) owned-and-operated station.

Prior to being acquired by BBN in 1991, this station was WSIX, one of Nashville's heritage radio stations.

== History ==
=== Early years in Springfield ===
WSIX signed on for the first time on January 7, 1927, from Springfield. It was started by Jack and Lewis Draughon, who owned the 638 Tire and Vulcanizing Company, and was established primarily to broadcast market reports from the city's tobacco market. The two brothers had acquired a discarded transmitter from a Nashville station in exchange for five barrels of oil and were counseled by a family friend not to go into the radio business, warning that they would bankrupt their father, a former state senator. The station broadcast with 150 watts at 1200 kHz (250 meters) for two hours a day, with longer hours on Thursday night when no other Nashville outlets broadcast. Named for the tire company, the station promoted its call letters as "Where Service Is Excellent". The first advertiser on the station was a barter deal: it was a man who had volunteered to help haul the transmitter from Nashville, where it was in an auto supply store, to Springfield.

WSIX was reallocated by General Order 40 in 1928 to 1210 kHz, where it operated with 100 watts. That same year, WSIX claimed to be the first radio station to broadcast a high school football game when it installed equipment to produce live airings of Springfield High School contests from the field. By 1932, the station broadcast 12 hours a day and had an arrangement to reair programs from Cincinnati's powerful WLW.

=== Move to Nashville ===
On November 13, 1934, the Draughon brothers filed for permission to move WSIX from Springfield to Nashville. The Federal Communications Commission set a hearing in February 1935 to consider the application. The WSIX proposal also contemplated a move to 1370 kHz, which put it in conflict with another applicant for a Nashville station and a proposed outlet for Evansville, Indiana.

The FCC approved the application on October 11, 1935, after WSIX opted to remain on 1210. On May 21, 1936, the station signed off from Springfield for the last time and went silent to make the move. WSIX signed on from Nashville on September 10. The station broadcast an 18-hour schedule from studios in the Hotel Andrew Jackson and a transmitter located at Third and Boscobel streets. A year later, the station increased its daytime power to 250 watts.

In its early years in Nashville, the station established itself as a community service outlet. During the Ohio River flood of 1937, WSIX broadcast two weeks of appeals for relief donations, a drive that had raised $16,715 in a week. Later that year, in a first, the Tennessee state highway department announced the names of low bidders for seven highway projects over the station.

WSIX's long-running association with WLW evolved in September 1939, when the station became an affiliate of the Mutual Broadcasting System alongside outlets in Louisville and Lexington. These and two other stations formed the Mutual "Southern Network". Firmly entrenched as Nashville's third radio station, WSIX applied in December 1940 to move its transmitter to a site at Buena Vista Pike and Moorman's Arm Road—later changed to a facility on McGavock Pike—change frequencies to 980 kHz, and increase power to 5,000 watts day and 1,000 night. The FCC approved the application on March 11, 1941, but the new facility was not ready in time for NARBA reallocation, so WSIX, as with other stations on 1210, moved to 1240 kHz on March 29. By this time, the studios were located on the fourteenth floor of the Nashville Trust Building.

The power increase, delayed by materials shortages from the onset of World War II, would not occur for more than a year. In the meantime, the station suffered through a one-day dispute with the local musicians' union that saw Mutual stop feeding music programs to WSIX. Finally, on June 12, WSIX moved from 1240 to 980 at its new power. Months later, WSIX became an affiliate of the Blue Network, predecessor to ABC.

=== New ventures after World War II ===
After the war, WSIX expanded. In March 1948, it launched an FM station at 97.5 MHz. The FM station would operate in its first form for five years before the station suspended FM operation on September 1, 1953. WSIX had gotten out of FM radio in order to get into television. WSIX-TV channel 8, also an ABC affiliate, began broadcasting November 29, 1953, as the second television station in the city, using the former FM outlet's tower. WSIX would return to FM in October 1959 with the launch of WSIX-FM, which broadcast briefly on 97.5 before moving within months to its present frequency of 97.9 MHz.

In 1961, the Draughons bought a parcel of land on Murfreesboro Pike to consolidate the radio stations, still in the Nashville Trust Building, and WSIX-TV, which had operated from a site on Old Hickory Boulevard. The radio stations began operating from the building in December 1961, and the television station joined them eight months later.

=== General Electric ownership ===
After owning WSIX for nearly 40 years, Louis Draughon sold the radio and television stations to General Electric in 1965. Though rumors of the sale were initially denied when they first circulated in Variety in September, the deal was announced on October 1. For $9.7 million, GE acquired the AM, FM and TV stations and a 35-acre (14 ha) industrial parcel near downtown Nashville. While WSIX-FM established itself as a successful country station in the 1970s, the AM counterpart tried a number of formats, including pop/adult contemporary, talk and country.

=== Sky Broadcasting and Capstar ===
GE first floated the sale of its Nashville operations in 1979 as part of divestitures required for its proposed merger with Cox Broadcasting, which ultimately collapsed. In 1983, GE agreed to sell its radio stations in Nashville and Schenectady, New York, to Sky Broadcasting, a private investment group owned by Foster Management Company; the news ended six months of GE searching for a buyer for the two Nashville outlets. Capstar Communications, formed by businessman Thomas O. Hicks, Jr. and formed to acquire country music stations in medium markets, acquired WSIX-AM-FM and four other stations for $40 million in 1989.

=== BBN ownership ===
In December 1990, Capstar sold the station to the Bible Broadcasting Network for $600,000; while the sale remained pending, WSIX AM simulcast the FM. BBN closed on the sale in April 1991 and began broadcasting its programming on the station on April 15, changing the call letters to WYFN.
