= WWCU =

Radio station at Western Carolina University in Dillsboro, North Carolina

- Dillsboro, North Carolina; United States
- Broadcast area: Jackson, Haywood and Macon counties in western North Carolina
- Frequency: 95.3 MHz
- Branding: 95.3 WWCU

Programming
- Format: Variety

Ownership
- Owner: Western Carolina University

History
- Founded: 1947
- First air date: January 24, 1977
- Former call signs: WWOO (95.3, 2018–2021)
- Former frequencies: 91.7 MHz (1977–1981); 90.5 MHz (1981–2021)
- Call sign meaning: Western Carolina University

Technical information
- Licensing authority: FCC
- Facility ID: 184618
- Class: A
- ERP: 1,050 watts
- HAAT: 241.4 meters (792 ft)
- Transmitter coordinates: 35°14′2.4″N 83°10′28.5″W

Links
- Public license information: Public file; LMS
- Website: www.wwcufm.com

WWCU (95.3 FM) is a radio station owned by Western Carolina University and licensed to Dillsboro, North Carolina. The station plays a variety format.

WWCU broadcasts 24 hours a day, seven days a week from studios in the Old Student Union on the Western Carolina campus as Jackson County's only local FM radio station. Student staff members work in an academic environment with studios similar to those found in commercial stations. The main transmitter is located on Brown Mountain.

WWCU airs mostly adult contemporary and country music. There are announcers on the station during regular rotation. There are also specialty shows during the evening and weekend hours.

WWCU is the flagship station for the Catamount Sports Network and provides coverage of the Western Carolina Catamounts, including Western Carolina Catamounts football, men's basketball, and women's basketball.

== History ==
In the autumn of 1947, carrier current station "WWOO" (550 AM) signed on from the Joyner Building (destroyed by fire in the early 1980s) as the first radio station in Jackson County. This station was carrier current, meaning that instead of broadcasting from a radio tower into the open air where anyone with a radio could pick it up, it transmitted, through phone lines, to small transmitters located in the basements of each dorm and building using the electrical wiring of that building as an antenna, broadcasting 15 watts of power. (Listeners had to be in the building to pick it up). Later the studios were moved to the Stillwell building (which at that time was the library) overlooking Memorial Football Stadium, which was located where the Apodaca Science Building is today. In 1967, WWOO became "WCAT" and moved its studios to what is now office suite 123 in the Killian building.

On June 13, 1975, Western Carolina University (WCU) applied for a construction permit for a 10-watt noncommercial FM station at 91.7 MHz, which was granted on March 5, 1976. The station began broadcasting January 24, 1977, calling itself "U-92 FM", from facilities in an unused basement section of the Moore Building. It moved to 90.5 MHz and upgraded to Class A status, with 327 watts, in 1981; stereo programming debuted in 1984, and another power increase to 760 watts was made in 1998.

In 2002, WWCU moved from its home of more than 25 years in the Moore Building to its newly built, state-of-the-art studios in the restored Old Student Union. Between 2003 and 2005, the station moved its primary transmitter to Cutoff Mountain, increasing coverage into Haywood County.

After applying in 2010, WCU was awarded a construction permit to build a 95.3 FM station, licensed to Dillsboro and broadcasting from Brown Mountain, in 2015. This station began temporary service in 2018 as WWOO, a simulcaster of WWCU, using a temporary 90-foot (27 m) fiberglass mast; work began on the construction of a new permanent tower after that. The Brown Mountain site allows the station to cover areas previously shielded from the Cutoff Mountain signal by terrain.

The 95.3 frequency had been used by Blue Ridge Public Radio (BPR) as a translator of WCQS, which was forced to move to another frequency. The university sold the WWCU 90.5 facility to BPR in 2020 for $97,000, excluding the station's former booster; on February 1, 2021, the 90.5 facility went silent and took the call letters WZQS.
