= WFKX =

Urban contemporary radio station in Henderson, Tennessee, United States

- Henderson, Tennessee; United States
- Broadcast area: Jackson, Tennessee
- Frequency: 95.7 MHz
- Branding: 96 Kix

Programming
- Format: Urban contemporary
- Affiliations: Westwood One

Ownership
- Owner: Southern Stone Communications, LLC
- Sister stations: WHHM-FM, WJAK, WWYN, WZDQ

History
- Call sign meaning: W F KiX

Technical information
- Licensing authority: FCC
- Facility ID: 73392
- Class: A
- ERP: 4,400 watts
- HAAT: 116.8 meters (383 ft)
- Transmitter coordinates: 35°29′52.00″N 88°42′29.00″W

Links
- Public license information: Public file; LMS
- Website: www.my96kix.com

WFKX (95.7 FM, "96 Kix") is a radio station broadcasting an urban contemporary music format. Licensed to Henderson, Tennessee, United States, the station is currently owned by Southern Stone Communications, LLC, and features programming from Westwood One.
