= WZQS =

Satellite of WYQS and WCQS-HD2
- Cullowhee, North Carolina; United States
- Broadcast area: Jackson and Haywood counties in western North Carolina
- Frequency: 90.5 MHz
- Branding: BPR Classic

Programming
- Format: Public radio (classical music, news, jazz)

Ownership
- Owner: Blue Ridge Public Radio; (Western North Carolina Public Radio, Inc.)

History
- First air date: 1977
- Former call signs: WWCU (1977–2021)
- Former frequencies: 91.7 MHz (1977–1981)
- Call sign meaning: Variation of WCQS and WYQS

Technical information
- Licensing authority: FCC
- Facility ID: 71766
- Class: A
- ERP: 240 watts
- HAAT: 289.0 meters
- Transmitter coordinates: 35°26′23.00″N 83°7′11.00″W

Links
- Public license information: Public file; LMS

WZQS is a radio station on 90.5 FM in Cullowhee, North Carolina, broadcasting to Jackson and Haywood counties in the western part of the state. It is owned by Blue Ridge Public Radio (BPR). It is part of the "BPR Classic" network, originating from WYQS (90.5) in Mars Hill and the second HD Radio channel of WCQS (88.1 FM) in Asheville.

The 90.5 facility was acquired by Blue Ridge, effective February 1, 2021, from Western Carolina University, under which it had operated as WWCU from 1977 to 2021. The university would rebuild WWCU on a newer and higher-power license at 95.3 MHz.

== History ==
In 1977, Western Carolina University, which had maintained a carrier current station on campus since 1947, built and signed on WWCU at 90.5 FM. This student radio station broadcast from a main site on Cutoff Mountain, but the region's rough terrain impeded any expansion of the station's coverage area. After applying in 2010, WCU was awarded a construction permit to build a 95.3 FM station, licensed to Dillsboro and broadcasting from Brown Mountain, in 2015. This station began temporary service as WWOO, a simulcaster of WWCU, using a temporary 90-foot (27 m) fiberglass mast, in 2018, and work began on the construction of a new permanent tower after that.

The 95.3 frequency had been used by a translator of BPR's WCQS, which was forced to move to another frequency. The university sold the WWCU facility to BPR in 2020 for $97,000, excluding the station's former booster. After the sale was completed on February 1, 2021, the 90.5 facility—renamed WZQS—was taken silent while it was relocated to a new site. On October 31, 2022, WZQS began airing the "BPR Classic" programming of WYQS and WCQS-HD2, as part of a realignment of BPR's two networks.
