= WFUR (AM) =

- Grand Rapids, Michigan; United States
- Frequency: 1570 kHz
- Branding: WFUR Classic

Programming
- Format: Christian radio

Ownership
- Owner: Furniture City Broadcasting Corporation

History
- First air date: 1947
- Call sign meaning: Furniture City

Technical information
- Licensing authority: FCC
- Facility ID: 22916
- Class: B
- Power: 1,000 watts (daytime); 307 watts (nighttime)
- Transmitter coordinates: 42°57′14.1″N 85°41′52.1″W
- Translator: 92.9 W225BL (Grand Haven)

Links
- Public license information: Public file; LMS

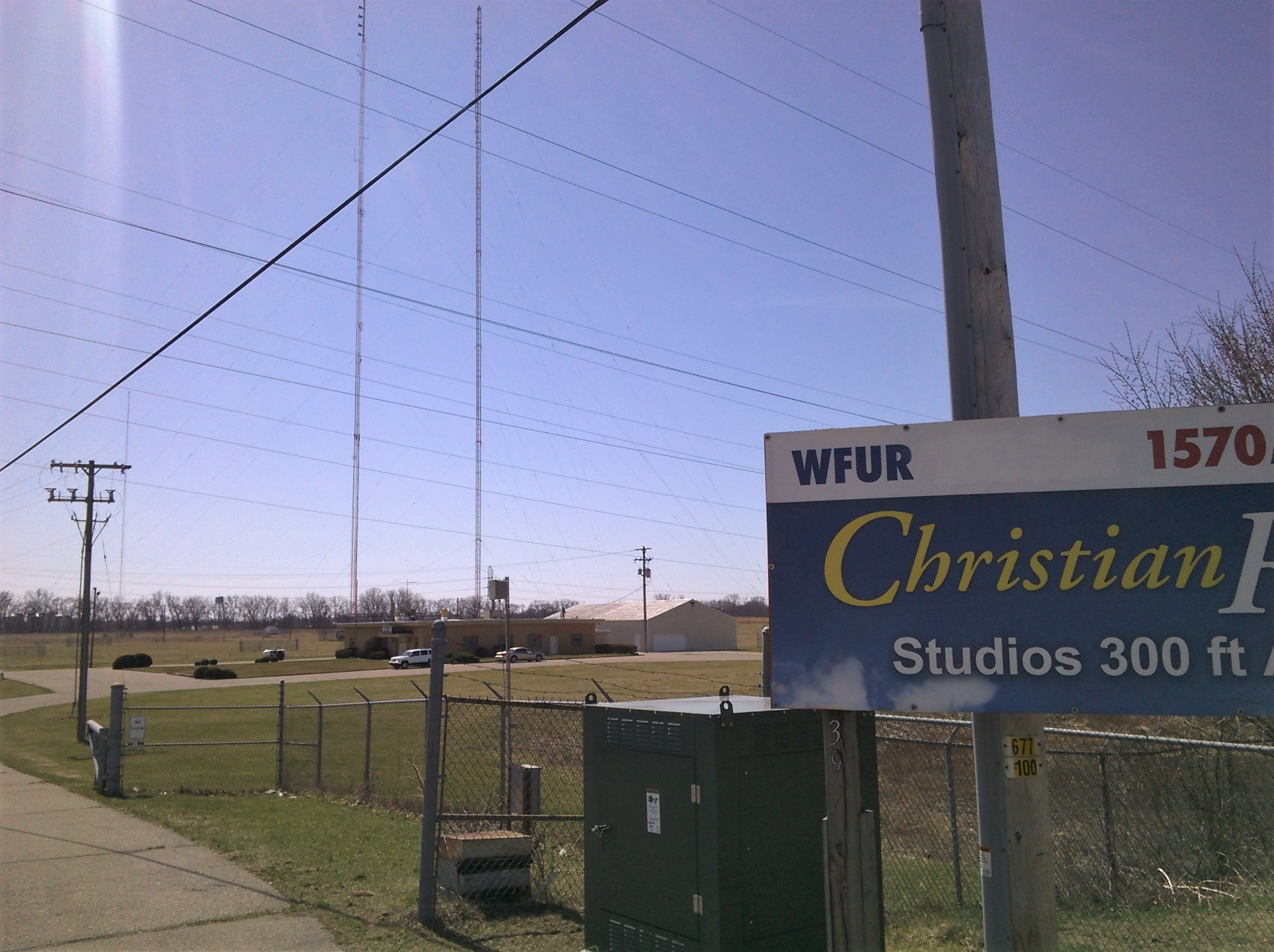
WFUR

WFUR (1570 AM, "WFUR Classic") is a radio station broadcasting a Christian radio format licensed to Grand Rapids, Michigan. It features a variety of teaching and preaching programs. Additionally, it features a variety of music. The music is a mixture of hymns and Christian classics (1960s through 1980s). WFUR transmits with a power of 1,000 watts daytime and 307 watts nighttime.

In May 2020 music was changed to 1970s to current and the "Classic" designation was mostly dropped. With the sale of sister station WFUR-FM 102.9 there is now only one WFUR on the radio dial. The separate music libraries are being merged.

== History ==
=== Beginning (1947–1950) ===
WFUR was constructed and put on the air in 1947. It was licensed as a 1,000-watt, daytime-only station. A trio of war veterans operated WFUR from 1947 to 1950. The programing was typical for that time period: Weekdays playing secular music and programs and some paid church programs on the weekends. One of the paid programs was the "Hour of Praise". The "Hour of Praise" had aired weekly for about 10 years on a variety of stations throughout west Michigan. It featured live and/or recorded live hymn-sings and sermons from various area churches. Overseeing those weekly broadcasts was William Kuiper. Kuiper had a clothing store in the Grand Rapids area and did the "Hour of Praise" on a volunteer basis. After some time, the owners of WFUR suggested that perhaps William Kuiper would like to purchase WFUR. Upon thinking and praying about the matter, Kuiper decided to attempt it.

=== Kuiper ownership (1950–present) ===
Kuiper's vision for a non-denominational Christian radio station. His unique idea was that it could be supported through advertising. The few Christian radio stations on the air at that time were supported by a single church or on-air fund raising. He felt strongly that people should tithe to their church, not a radio station. Secondly, he wanted to allow various Christian groups to purchase airtime, which at that time was not the norm.

== WFUR-FM ==
In 1960, sister station WFUR-FM 102.9 was put on the air at the same facility location. At 12 noon on May 12, 2020, WFUR-FM played its last sign-off announcement. This ends its history in west Michigan. The station later returned to the air as WYHA, part of the Bible Broadcasting Network.

== Translator ==
Broadcast translator for WFUR
| Call sign | Frequency | City of license | FID | ERP (W) | HAAT | Class | Transmitter coordinates | FCC info |
|---|---|---|---|---|---|---|---|---|
| W225BL | 92.9 FM | Grand Haven, Michigan | 152350 | 250 | 0 m (0 ft) | D | 42°57′13.1″N 85°41′55.1″W | LMS |

In the summer of 2013, WFUR purchased an FM translator. The translator, W225BL, signed on that November. The antenna is mounted on the WYHA tower.

== Sources ==
- Michiguide.com - WFUR History
