= WXML =

- Upper Sandusky, Ohio; United States
- Broadcast area: Mid-Ohio
- Frequency: 90.1 MHz
- Branding: New Vision FM

Programming
- Format: Christian radio
- Affiliations: AP Radio

Ownership
- Owner: Kayser Broadcast Ministries
- Sister stations: WXMF, WXMW

History
- Former call signs: WVZX (1990–1990)

Technical information
- Licensing authority: FCC
- Facility ID: 33626
- Class: B
- ERP: 15,000 watts
- HAAT: 158 meters
- Transmitter coordinates: 40°54′53.00″N 83°7′32.00″W

Links
- Public license information: Public file; LMS
- Webcast: Listen Live
- Website: Official website

WXML (90.1 FM) is a radio station broadcasting a Christian radio format. Licensed to Upper Sandusky, Ohio, United States, the station serves the Mid-Ohio area. The station is currently owned by Kayser Broadcast Ministries and features programming from AP Radio.

== History ==
The station went on the air as WXML on 1990-10-03. On 1990-11-15, the station changed its call sign to WVZX, and on 1991-11-22 to the current WXML,

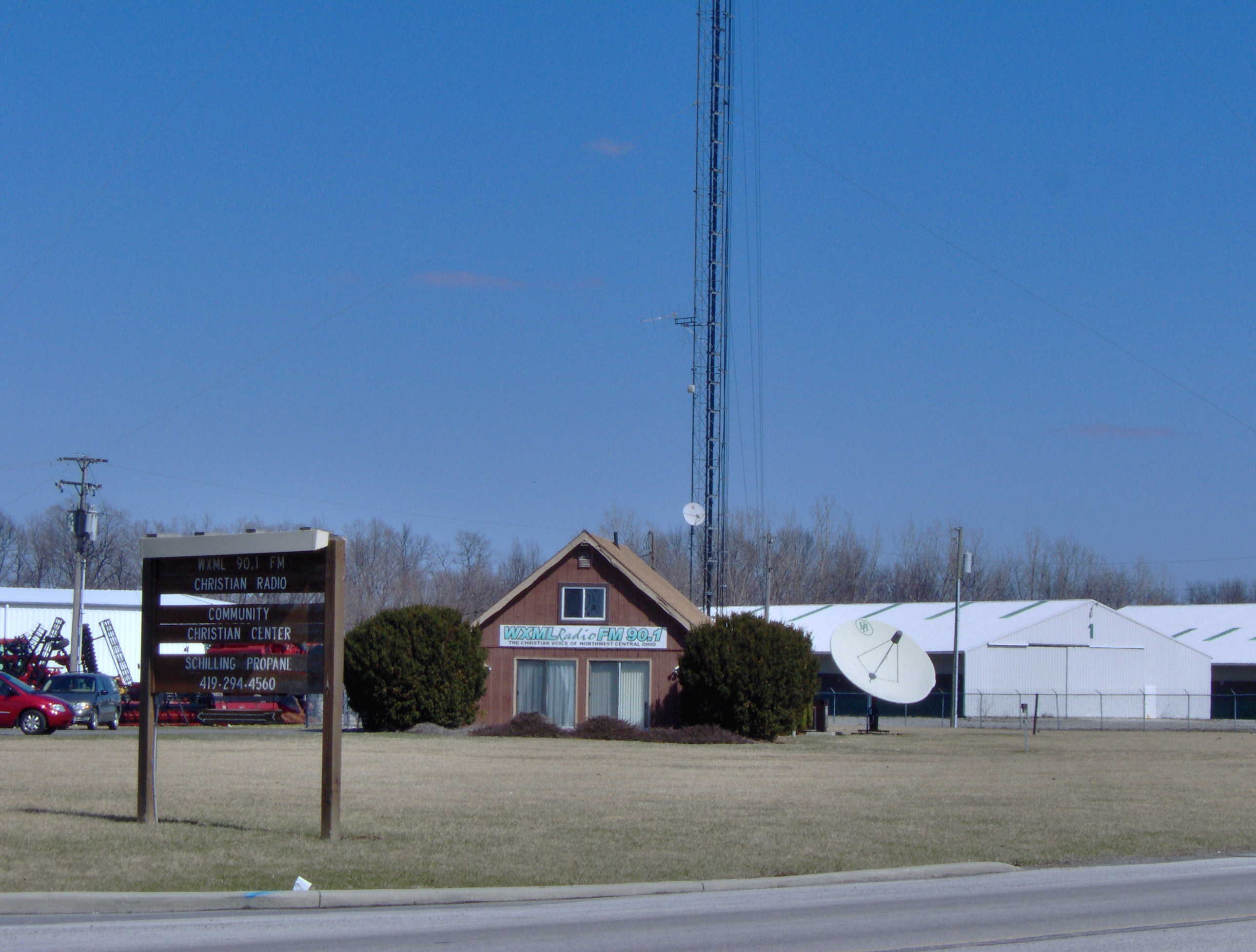
WXML studio, office and transmitter facility, just off Route 30 on the outskirts of Upper Sandusky, Ohio. This had once served as the original studio, office and transmitter facility for WYAN-FM 95.9 in Upper Sandusky (now WYNT Caledonia) until being silenced by bankruptcy.

Former logo
