= WCQS =

Public radio station in Asheville, North Carolina, United States

Blue Ridge Public Radio Flagship Station

- Asheville, North Carolina; United States
- Broadcast area: Western North Carolina
- Frequency: 88.1 MHz (HD Radio)
- Branding: Blue Ridge Public Radio; BPR News

Programming
- Format: Public radio (news/talk)
- Subchannels: HD2: Simulcast of WYQS
- Affiliations: NPR; BBC World Service; Public Radio Exchange; American Public Media

Ownership
- Owner: Western North Carolina Public Radio, Inc.
- Sister stations: WYQS

History
- First air date: August 28, 1975; 50 years ago
- Former call signs: WUNF-FM (1974–1984)

Technical information
- Licensing authority: FCC
- Facility ID: 71923
- Class: C3
- ERP: 1,900 watts
- HAAT: 356 meters (1,168 ft)
- Transmitter coordinates: 35.589806°N 82.673722°W
- Translators: See § Translators; HD2: See WYQS § Translators
- Repeater: See § Repeaters

Links
- Public license information: Public file; LMS
- Website: www.bpr.org

WCQS (88.1 FM) is a non-commercial public radio station located in Asheville, North Carolina, serving Western North Carolina. It airs a news and talk radio format and is owned by Western North Carolina Public Radio, Inc. It airs programming from NPR, American Public Media and the Public Radio Exchange and is the flagship station of Blue Ridge Public Radio. It carries locally produced news and music shows, under the BPR News branding. The BBC World Service is heard overnight.

WCQS is a Class C3 station. It has a public radio format and well as an effective radiated power (ERP) of 1,900 watts, with an FCC construction permit to increase power to 5,000 watts. The transmitter is on High Top Mountain Road in Asheville. Serving 14 counties across the mountainous terrain of Western North Carolina requires Blue Ridge Public Radio to broadcast on a host of sister stations and FM translators to effectively reach its audience. It can also be heard online via the Blue Ridge Public Radio app, and on the BPR website.

== History ==
=== Early years (1975-1984) ===
WCQS began August 28, 1975, as WUNF-FM, a 10-watt station (later upgraded to 110-watt station) operated by the University of North Carolina at Asheville from the Lipinski Student Center. Western North Carolina Public Radio bought the station in 1984, changed the call sign to WCQS, and immediately secured a membership agreement with NPR. While most of the station's coverage area was served by South Carolina Educational Radio's Upstate outlet, WEPR in Greenville, WNCPR wanted to build a station that would be tailored to the area's interests.

Eventually, the station increased its power to 1,600 watts, still a fairly modest level for a full NPR member on the FM band. This may be due to the need to protect WRVL in Lynchburg, Virginia, located at adjacent 88.3. As a result, even though its transmitter is located 3,609 feet (1,100 m) above sea level, its coverage area is effectively limited to Asheville and its close-in suburbs in Buncombe, Haywood and Henderson counties.

In 2005, WNCPR bought WVMH, a radio station operated by Mars Hill College, and changed its call sign to WYQS. Originally a straight simulcast of WCQS, it broke off in 2008 to air the BBC World Service full-time, and continued to do so until early 2017.

=== Changes in staff ===
In the summer of 2010, Jody Evans joined WCQS as executive director, replacing Ed Subkis, who had held the job for 18 years. Evans wanted WCQS to become a source for news and information, and she planned on more local news coverage and working with other news media. One joint project was live broadcasts from Brevard Music Center, which would use the resources of WDAV in the Charlotte area.

In February 2011, Evans said that WCQS would have more emphasis on local news, and that David Hurand's evening shows Byline, Conversations, and Evening Rounds would be dropped. Hurand added local news reports during the more popular shows Morning Edition and All Things Considered. New national shows being added included Marketplace and The Splendid Table.

On March 24, 2013, WCQS added WMQS at 88.5 FM, to serve the Murphy area.

July 2015 saw the arrival of a new general manager and CEO, David Feingold. Matt Bush replaced Hurand as News Editor the following year.

=== Relaunch and BPR News ===
In the spring of 2017, WCQS and its associated stations rebranded as "Blue Ridge Public Radio". WCQS (and its repeaters and translators) became "BPR Classic", retaining their established format of NPR programming and classical music. As part of the relaunch, on March 6, 2017, WYQS relaunched as "BPR News", an all news-and-talk station airing BBC and NPR programming around the clock. Its launch ended the 24-hour carriage of the BBC World Service after almost a decade.

Since WYQS operates at only 100 watts, it is available on WCQS's HD Radio subchannel WCQS HD-2 and online.

On October 11, 2022, Blue Ridge Public Radio announced that it would swap the formats of WCQS and WYQS on October 31, with "BPR News" airing on WCQS and its satellites and "BPR Classic" moving to WYQS and WZQS.

== Repeaters ==
WCQS operates two full-powered rebroadcasters: WFQS in Franklin at 91.3 FM and WMQS in Murphy at 88.5 FM. In addition, there are nine low-powered translators to serve its vast and mountainous coverage area.

Call sign	Frequency	City of license	Facility ID	Class	ERP (W)	Height (m (ft))	Transmitter coordinates
WFQS	91.3 FM	Franklin, North Carolina	71880	C3	265	702 meters (2,303 ft)	35°10′24.3″N 83°34′51.5″W
WMQS	88.5 FM	Murphy, North Carolina	173770	A	49	196 meters (643 ft)	35°7′37.3″N 84°1′34.6″W

=== Translators ===
Call sign	Frequency	City of license	FID	ERP (W)	HAAT	Class	Transmitter coordinates	FCC info
W298AY	107.5 FM	Black Mountain, North Carolina	156260	10	76.6 m (251 ft)	D	35°37′44.4″N 82°20′45.4″W	LMS
W213BX	90.5 FM	Brevard, North Carolina	71882	10	411.2 m (1,349 ft)	D	35°10′34.4″N 82°40′54.4″W	LMS
W234AS	94.7 FM	Bryson City, North Carolina	144135	10	267.9 m (879 ft)	D	35°24′47.3″N 83°30′1.5″W	LMS
W209AD	89.7 FM	Clyde, North Carolina	71878	8.9	0 m (0 ft)	D	35°34′6.3″N 82°54′26.4″W	LMS
W209AE	89.7 FM	Cullowhee, etc., North Carolina	71879	19	0 m (0 ft)	D	35°18′50.2″N 83°12′4.1″W	LMS
W277CU	103.3 FM	Highlands, North Carolina	81929	10	0 m (0 ft)	D	35°2′21.3″N 83°13′3.5″W	LMS
W218AB	91.5 FM	Sylva, North Carolina	71924	10	0 m (0 ft)	D	39°22′1.3″N 83°13′17.5″W	LMS
W268BS	101.5 FM	Tryon, North Carolina	148869	10	0 m (0 ft)	D	35°16′0.4″N 82°14′33.4″W	LMS
W275BU	102.9 FM	Waynesville, North Carolina	71881	125	0 m (0 ft)	D	35°27′43.3″N 83°6′25.5″W	LMS

The Bryson City and Highlands translators are nominally part of the WFQS license. However, WFQS is a straight simulcast of WCQS.

The reception areas of WCQS and WYQS overlap significantly in some areas due to the topography, giving listeners more programming choices. The station also makes efforts to push uptake of its mobile app and streaming services.

These are former translators that have been moved to new frequencies:

- 95.3 W237AR, Hazelwood, North Carolina - moved to 102.9 W275BU
- 101.7 W269AY, Highlands, North Carolina - moved to 103.3 W277CU

On October 31, 2022, W213BX swapped places with W268CL, which was simulcasting WCQS-HD2.
