= WYFJ =

- Ashland, Virginia; United States
- Broadcast area: Metro Richmond
- Frequency: 99.9 MHz
- Branding: Bible Broadcasting Network

Programming
- Format: Religious
- Affiliations: Bible Broadcasting Network

Ownership
- Owner: Bible Broadcasting Network

History
- First air date: 1967
- Call sign meaning: Where You Find Joy

Technical information
- Licensing authority: FCC
- Facility ID: 5096
- Class: A
- Power: 6,000 Watts
- HAAT: 100 meters (330 ft)
- Transmitter coordinates: 37°33′50.0″N 77°27′29.0″W

Links
- Public license information: Public file; LMS
- Webcast: WYFJ Webstream
- Website: WYFJ Online

WYFJ is a religious formatted broadcast radio station licensed to Ashland, Virginia, serving Metro Richmond. WYFJ is owned and operated by Bible Broadcasting Network.

== History ==
This station signed on the air in 1967 as WIVE-FM. The station, along with sister WIVE-AM did a locally based religious format and also operated a Christian bookstore out of their facility on Ashcake Road in Hanover County. In the early eighties, WIVE-FM was sold to the Bible Broadcast Network, who changed the callsign to WYFJ and moved the FM station to facilities on Washington Highway. The AM station was not part of the purchase.

The station moved from 100.1 MHz to 99.9 MHz on July 24, 2010. As part of the switch, the station's transmitter moved from Ashland to a location near The Diamond in Richmond.
