= WXMW =

Coordinates: 40°54′53″N 83°07′32″W

- Sycamore, Ohio; United States
- Broadcast area: Upper Sandusky, Ohio - Bucyrus, Ohio
- Frequency: 89.3 MHz
- Branding: New Vision FM

Programming
- Format: Christian radio
- Affiliations: Salem Radio Network, Moody Radio

Ownership
- Owner: Kayser Broadcast Ministries
- Sister stations: WXMF, WXML

Technical information
- Licensing authority: FCC
- Facility ID: 171901
- Class: A
- ERP: 390 watts
- HAAT: 158 meters

Links
- Public license information: Public file; LMS
- Webcast: Listen Live
- Website: Official website

WXMW (89.3 FM) is a radio station broadcasting a Christian radio format. Licensed to Sycamore, Ohio, United States, the station serves the areas of Upper Sandusky, Ohio and Bucyrus, Ohio. The station is currently owned by Kayser Broadcast Ministries.

WXMW airs a variety of Christian talk and teaching programs including; Revive our Hearts with Nancy Leigh DeMoss, Insight for Living with Chuck Swindoll, and In the Market with Janet Parshall. WXMW also airs a variety of Christian music.
