= WXMF =

Coordinates: 40°36′51″N 83°12′56″W

- Marion, Ohio; United States
- Frequency: 91.9 MHz
- Branding: New Vision FM

Programming
- Format: Christian radio
- Affiliations: Salem Radio Network, Moody Radio

Ownership
- Owner: Kayser Broadcast Ministries
- Sister stations: WXMW, WXML

Technical information
- Licensing authority: FCC
- Facility ID: 93251
- Class: A
- ERP: 6,000 watts
- HAAT: 93 meters (305 ft)

Links
- Public license information: Public file; LMS
- Webcast: Listen Live
- Website: Official website

WXMF (91.9 FM) is a radio station broadcasting a Christian radio format. Licensed to Marion, Ohio, United States, the station is currently owned by Kayser Broadcast Ministries.

WXMF airs a variety of Christian talk and teaching programs including; Revive our Hearts with Nancy Leigh DeMoss, Insight for Living with Chuck Swindoll, and In the Market with Janet Parshall. WXMF also airs a variety of Christian music.
