= WHPE-FM =

Bible Broadcasting Network radio station in High Point, North Carolina

Coordinates: 35.9196°N 80.0295°W

- High Point, North Carolina; United States
- Broadcast area: Piedmont Triad
- Frequency: 95.5 MHz

Programming
- Format: Christian talk and teaching

Ownership
- Owner: Bible Broadcasting Network

History
- First air date: November 1947 (78 years ago)
- Call sign meaning: High Point Enterprise (former newspaper owner); "Where His Praises Echo" (backronym)

Technical information
- Licensing authority: FCC
- Facility ID: 5164
- Class: C1
- ERP: 100,000 watts
- HAAT: 159 meters (522 ft)
- Translator: (96.7 MHz) W244BB (Princeton, WV)

Links
- Public license information: Public file; LMS
- Webcast: Listen live
- Website: www.bbnradio.org

WHPE-FM (95.5 MHz) is an FM radio station licensed to High Point, North Carolina, and serving the Piedmont Triad region of North Carolina, including Greensboro and Winston-Salem. The station broadcasts a Christian talk and teaching radio format and is owned by the Charlotte-based Bible Broadcasting Network, which has Christian stations around the U.S. National religious leaders heard on WHPE-FM include Adrian Rogers, Chuck Swindoll, Joni Eareckson Tada and J. Vernon McGee.

WHPE-FM has an effective radiated power (ERP) of 100,000 watts, the maximum for non-grandfathered FM stations. In addition, it feeds a network of FM translator stations in North Carolina, Virginia and West Virginia.

== History ==
WHPE-FM signed on in November 1947, months after its AM counterpart, WHPE (1070). That makes WHPE-FM one of the oldest FM stations in North Carolina. Both stations were originally owned by the High Point Enterprise daily newspaper, from which the stations derived their call sign.

The newspaper sold the stations in 1953. The stations aired Christian programming in the 1960s. For a brief time in the early 1970s, they switched to Top 40 hits. The Bible Broadcasting Network acquired WHPE-AM-FM in October 1974, as the network's second station; the price was $650,000.

On October 28, 1986, just before a fund-raiser, the WHPE studios were damaged by an arson fire. The AM station was later sold and now broadcasts Christian programming in Spanish as WGOS.
