= Pam Stone =

American actress

Pam Stone (born September 30, 1959) is an American actress, comedian, writer, and talk radio host.

Born in Marietta, Georgia, Stone graduated from Joseph Wheeler High School and attended Kennesaw College, in Kennesaw, Georgia, before leaving in her third year to pursue stand-up comedy in Los Angeles.

Stone is one of the few comedians ever invited to perform at The White House, and in her stand-up career has appeared on The Tonight Show with Jay Leno, Oprah Winfrey, Joan Rivers, as well as multiple appearances on Comic Strip Live, three Showtime cable comedy specials: Pam Stone, A Pair of Jokers, Showtime's Comedy Club All-Stars, and Showtime's Montreal Comedy Festival. She also hosted ABC's 50 Years of Funny Females and, on several occasions, guest hosted E! TV's Talk Soup. In 1992, Stone won the American Comedy Award for Best Female Stand-up.

Stone co-starred in the television series Coach for seven seasons as the character, Judy Watkins. She also appeared in the sit-com, The Drew Carey Show, the Rob Reiner political documentary, But, Seriously, and the George Lucas 1994 film Radioland Murders.

She hosted a syndicated daytime talk radio show, The Pam Stone Show, for five years, which first aired on weekdays, then Saturdays, on Charlotte, North Carolina–based radio station WLNK 107.9 The Link. She received two Gracie Awards for Best Comedy Entertainment Program.

Until 2012, Stone continued in radio as a co-host of the Sunday program The Satisfied Life with WLNK afternoon co-host Ramona Holloway.

Stone currently writes a syndicated humor column, which was awarded Best Humor Column in 2012 by The SC Press Association, and is the basis for her 2012 book, I Love Me A Turkey Butt Samwich as well as being the author of Rats! Rats! Rats! and Only Horsepeople. In 2017, she released her first novel, 'Girls Like Her,' which was nominated for The Southern Book Prize

== Filmography ==
- Coach (1989–1997) (Judy Watkins/Judy) (23 episodes)
- Radioland Murders (1994) (Dottie)
- The Drew Carey Show (1997) (Lois) (Drewstock)
- Love Boat: The Next Wave (1998) (Judith) (Remember)
