= WYQS =

Public radio station in Mars Hill, North Carolina

- Asheville, North Carolina; United States
- Frequency: 90.5 MHz
- Branding: BPR Classic

Programming
- Format: Public radio (classical music; news, jazz)

Ownership
- Owner: Western North Carolina Public Radio, Inc.
- Sister stations: WCQS

History
- First air date: 1975 (as WVMH-FM)
- Former call signs: WVMH-FM (1975–2005)

Technical information
- Licensing authority: FCC
- Facility ID: 40436
- Class: C3
- ERP: 750 watts
- HAAT: 366 meters (1,201 ft)
- Transmitter coordinates: 35°35′23.00″N 82°40′25.00″W
- Repeaters: 88.1 WCQS-HD2 (Asheville); 90.5 WZQS (Cullowhee)

Links
- Public license information: Public file; LMS
- Webcast: Listen live
- Website: www.bpr.org

WYQS (90.5 FM; "BPR Classic") is a radio station licensed to Asheville, North Carolina, United States. The station is owned by Western North Carolina Public Radio, Inc. (styled as "Blue Ridge Public Radio"), owner of the area's flagship public radio station, WCQS. The format is a mixture of classical music, NPR programs, and jazz.

As well as being available via a number of low-power translators as far apart as Brevard, Bryson City, Hendersonville, and Waynesville, BPR Classic is carried on WZQS (90.5 FM) in Cullowhee and the second HD Radio channel of WCQS. It is also streamed live via the Blue Ridge Public Radio mobile app and on the station's website, making it available over a much wider area than its FM reach alone would allow.

== History ==
The station went on the air as WVMH-FM in 1975; it was originally owned by Mars Hill College.

On April 12, 2005, after being purchased by Blue Ridge Public Radio, the station changed its call sign to the current WYQS and became a full repeater of WCQS. In 2008, the station broke off and began airing programming from the BBC World Service 24 hours a day. This 24-hour relay of BBC programming continued, uninterrupted, for almost a decade.

This station's transmitter was relocated to Big Knob after the Madison County Board of Commissioners voted to allow space to be leased on the tower there.

=== Relaunch as BPR News ===
In the spring of 2017, WCQS and its associated stations rebranded under the name "Blue Ridge Public Radio", with WCQS (and its repeaters and translators) continuing to air the established format of NPR programming and classical music. At this point WYQS became the home for a new channel, BPR News, with the aim of providing listeners with the choice of an all-speech format station in addition to the established NPR/classical format on WCQS.

The reception areas of WCQS and WYQS overlap significantly in some areas due to the topography, giving listeners a choice of FM listening from Blue Ridge Public Radio. The station also makes efforts to push uptake of its mobile app and streaming services.

=== Switch to BPR Classic ===
On October 11, 2022, Blue Ridge Public Radio announced that it would swap the formats of WCQS and WYQS on October 31. The BPR News programming moved to WCQS and its satellites, while BPR Classic—which carries classical music, some news programming (including Morning Edition, Fresh Air, All Things Considered, and Marketplace), and an evening block of jazz—moved to WYQS and WZQS.

=== Upgrade Into Asheville ===
On April 13, 2026, WYQS completed its signal upgrade and transmitter move into Asheville and raised power to 750 watts.

== Translators ==
In addition to WYQS, WZQS, and WCQS HD2, BPR Classic is heard over five translators in western North Carolina:

Broadcast translators of WCQS-HD2
| Call sign | Frequency (MHz) | City of license | Facility ID |
|---|---|---|---|
| W300CR | 107.9 | Asheville, North Carolina | 156283 |
| W252DN | 98.3 | Balsam, North Carolina (Note: Near Waynesville-Hazelwood, North Carolina) | 148241 |
| W268CL | 101.5 | Brevard, North Carolina | 156074 |
| W256CY | 99.1 | Bryson City, North Carolina | 144138 |
| W276CT | 103.1 | Hendersonville, North Carolina | 156266 |

On October 31, 2022, W268CL swapped places with W213BX, which was simulcasting WCQS.
