= WXZC =

Simulcast of WXCZ, Cedar Key, Florida
- Inglis, Florida; United States
- Broadcast area: Citrus County, Florida
- Frequency: 104.3 MHz
- Branding: Nature Coast Country

Programming
- Format: Country
- Affiliations: Westwood One

Ownership
- Owner: Betty Lou Marcocci, Steve Schurdell, and Rusty Marcocci; (WGUL-FM, Inc.)
- Operator: WGUL-FM, Inc.
- Sister stations: WYKE-CD

History
- First air date: May 5, 1993; 32 years ago (as WABU)
- Former call signs: WABU (1993); WAVQ (1993–1998); WHGN (1998–2000); WIFL (2000–2010); WOGF (2010–2011); WYKE (2011–2018)

Technical information
- Licensing authority: FCC
- Facility ID: 71585
- Class: C3
- ERP: 19,000 watts
- HAAT: 112 meters (367 ft)
- Transmitter coordinates: 29°1′18.00″N 82°41′20.00″W

Links
- Public license information: Public file; LMS
- Webcast: Listen Live
- Website: naturecoastcountry.com

WXZC (104.3 FM) is a commercial radio station licensed to Inglis, Florida, and covering much of Citrus County, Florida. The station is currently owned by Betty Lou Marcocci, Steve Schurdell, and Rusty Marcocci, through licensee WGUL-FM, Inc.

WXZC airs a country music radio format, simulcast from 103.3 WXCZ in Cedar Key, Florida, which is also owned by WGUL-FM, Inc. The two stations call themselves "Nature Coast Country."

== History ==
The station was granted a construction permit as WABU on May 28, 1993. On June 25, 1993, the station changed its call sign to WAVQ, and signed on the air during the summer of 1996. On May 16, 1998, the call sign was changed to WHGN; on October 11, 2000, to WIFL; on July 22, 2010, to WOGF; and on July 25, 2011, to WYKE. It has broadcast numerous music and talk formats, under such brands as "Wow 104.3", "Extreme Talk Radio 104.3", "Frank 104.3", and "Frank Talk 104.3".

For a period in 2011, it was silent, before coming under the ownership of the Citrus County Association for Retarded Citizens, Inc. In November 2011, WYKE was granted a construction permit to upgrade to Class C3 and boost its effective radiated power to 19,000 watts. In the early 2010s, the station was a Fox Sports Radio Network affiliate. It was also an affiliate of the USF Bulls football network for the 2011 season. WYKE was later a CBS Sports Radio affiliate.

On April 13, 2018, it was announced that WYKE's programming and sales would be taken over by WGUL-FM, Inc. under a three-year local marketing agreement (LMA), with the option to purchase the station outright. The station flipped to a country music format on April 15, 2018. It changed its call sign to WXZC on April 18, 2018. Effective April 28, 2021, the Citrus County Association for Retarded Citizens, Inc sold WXZC to WGUL-FM, Inc. for $340,000.
