= WZDQ =

Active rock radio station in Humboldt, Tennessee, United States

- Humboldt, Tennessee; United States
- Broadcast area: Jackson, Tennessee
- Frequency: 102.3 MHz
- Branding: 102.3 The Rocket

Programming
- Format: Active rock
- Affiliations: Compass Media Networks; Tennessee Titans Radio Network

Ownership
- Owner: Thomas Radio, LLC; (Southern Stone Communications, LLC)
- Sister stations: WFKX, WHHM-FM, WJAK, WWYN

History
- First air date: September 1, 1964 (as WIRJ-FM)
- Former call signs: WIRJ-FM (1964–1982); WZDQ (1982–1985); WIRJ-FM (6/1985-10/1985)
- Call sign meaning: WZDQ 102 (former format)

Technical information
- Licensing authority: FCC
- Facility ID: 54032
- Class: A
- ERP: 6,000 watts
- HAAT: 91 meters (299 ft)
- Transmitter coordinates: 35°45′45.00″N 88°51′42.00″W

Links
- Public license information: Public file; LMS
- Webcast: Listen Live
- Website: therocketjackson.com

WZDQ (102.3 FM, "102.3 The Rocket") is a radio station broadcasting an active rock music format. Licensed to Humboldt, Tennessee, United States, the station serves the Jackson, Tennessee, area. The station is currently owned by Thomas Radio, LLC.

== History ==
The station was assigned the call letters WZDQ on January 10, 1982. On June 3, 1985, the station changed its call sign to WIRJ-FM then on October 20, 1985, back to the current call-letters WZDQ, as "Q102".,
