= WYDL =

- Middleton, Tennessee; United States
- Broadcast area: Corinth, Mississippi
- Frequency: 100.3 MHz
- Branding: Hot 100

Programming
- Format: Top 40 (CHR)

Ownership
- Owner: Mike Brandt; (Southern Broadcasting LLC)
- Sister stations: WWFA, WWGM

History
- First air date: 2001 (as WTCK-FM at 100.7)
- Former call signs: WTCK (1999–2000); WTCK-FM (2000–2002)
- Former frequencies: 100.7 MHz (2001–2011)

Technical information
- Licensing authority: FCC
- Facility ID: 85315
- Class: C3
- ERP: 25,000 watts
- HAAT: 100 meters (330 ft)
- Transmitter coordinates: 35°0′13.00″N 88°39′39.00″W

Links
- Public license information: Public file; LMS

WYDL (100.3 FM, "Hot 100") is a radio station licensed to Middleton, Tennessee, U.S., serving Corinth, Mississippi. Originally a CHR based radio station since 2002 and for most of its existence, it has undergone two format changes which included several years as Classic Rock and Soft Adult Contemporary. On September 29, 2023, at 12:30 pm the station started playing a series of songs with the theme of “goodbye”. At 1:00 pm the station suddenly flipped formats back to its original CHR format. The station is currently owned by Mike Brandt, through licensee Southern Broadcasting LLC.

== History ==
WYDL, originally WTCK, an urban station branded as Hot 100.7 The # 1 Hip Hop and R&B until November 2002. Mike B, a DJ from Detroit, formed MD Broadcasting in 2002 and in November 2002 launched WYDL WILD 100.7, an Adult Top 40 (CHR) station. In 2002, WTCK-FM changed the call letters to WYDL and launched with Adult Top 40 format airing Top 40 hits of the 80s, 90s and Today. However, in 2007, for a brief time, WILD 100.7 decided to take on syndication in the mornings with Bob & Tom, therefore placing Mike B (TIC TAK) in the afternoon drive time. October 19, 2007, was the last day for Bob & Tom, and a new local morning show took its place. That moved TIC TAK back to Morning Drive and paired him with Wild's night personality ACE, forming "The T&A Morning Show". In October 2009, yet another change to the "Wild" lineup, adding Elvis Duran from Z100 New York to mornings.

On October 11, 2011, WYDL moved from 100.7 FM to 100.3 FM and rebranded as "100.3 Kiss FM".

On September 20, 2013, 100.3 started stunting with non-stop Elvis Presley. The last song as 100.3 Kiss-FM, according to the website, was believed to be Maroon 5's Daylight.

On September 26, 2013, WYDL ended stunting and changed its format from top 40/CHR to classic rock, branded as "Rock 100".

On July 7, 2017, WYDL changed its format from classic rock back to top 40/CHR, branded as "Hot 100".

On December 25, 2020, WYDL changed its format from top 40/CHR to soft adult contemporary, branded as "Easy 100.3".

On September 29, 2023, WYDL began playing 30 minutes of songs with the common theme “goodbye”, then at 1 pm the station changed back to its original format of top 40/CHR, once again branded as “Hot 100”.

== Signal range ==
WYDL's signal can be heard from Jackson, Tennessee, to Tupelo, Mississippi.
