= WWDR =

Simulcasts WYTT Emporia, Virginia
- Murfreesboro, North Carolina; United States
- Frequency: 1080 kHz
- Branding: 99.5 & 105.9 Jamz

Programming
- Format: Urban adult contemporary

Ownership
- Owner: Byrne Acquisition Group, LLC
- Sister stations: WSMY

History
- First air date: March 20, 1965
- Former call signs: WYCM (1983–1997); WWDR (1997–2000); WINX (2000–2002)
- Call sign meaning: "We're Wally, Don & Ray"

Technical information
- Licensing authority: FCC
- Facility ID: 56666
- Class: D
- Power: 930 watts day
- Transmitter coordinates: 36°26′24.00″N 77°8′10.00″W

Links
- Public license information: Public file; LMS
- Webcast: Listen Live
- Website: www.roanokenewstalk.com

WWDR (1080 AM) is a radio station broadcasting an urban adult contemporary format. Licensed to Murfreesboro, North Carolina, United States, the station is currently owned by Byrne Acquisition Group, LLC. The call letters were the one alternate after the FCC turned down the original five requested call letters. WWDR stands for the first names of the station's founders, "We're Wally, Don & Ray". The station is branded as 99.5 & 105.9 Jamz.

As 1080 AM is a United States clear-channel frequency, on which KOAN, KRLD, and WTIC share Class A status, WWDR must leave the air from sunset to sunrise to prevent nighttime skywave interference to those Class A stations.
