= WWYN =

Country music radio station in McKenzie, Tennessee, United States

Coordinates: 35.901°N 88.781°W

- McKenzie, Tennessee; United States
- Broadcast area: Jackson, Tennessee
- Frequency: 106.9 MHz
- Branding: WYN 106.9

Programming
- Format: Country

Ownership
- Owner: Thomas Media; (Southern Stone Communications, LLC)
- Sister stations: WFKX, WJAK, WHHM-FM, WZDQ

Technical information
- Licensing authority: FCC
- Facility ID: 54947
- Class: C1
- ERP: 100,000 watts
- HAAT: 266 meters (873 ft)

Links
- Public license information: Public file; LMS
- Webcast: Listen Live
- Website: wyn1069.com

WWYN (106.9 FM), known as "WYN 106.9", is a country music radio station based in McKenzie, Tennessee. WWYN is owned by Thomas Media and is currently the top rated radio station in the West Tennessee area.

WWYN serves Jackson, Tennessee, and all of West Tennessee with an ERP of 100,000 Watts. WWYN's sister stations are WHHM (Star 107.7), WFKX (96 KIX), and WZDQ (102.3 The Rocket). WWYN once branded itself as "WYN107". Cities in WWYN primary coverage area include: Mayfield and Murray Kentucky, Jackson, Lexington, Paris, Union City, Dyersburg, Brownsville, Bolivar, Savannah, and Henderson Tennessee.
