= WYFC =

Coordinates: 36.073°N 84.022°W

- Clinton, Tennessee; United States
- Broadcast area: Knoxville, Tennessee
- Frequency: 95.3 MHz

Programming
- Format: Christian radio

Ownership
- Owner: Bible Broadcasting Network

History
- Former call signs: WTNZ (September 1986- October 1989)

Technical information
- Licensing authority: FCC
- Facility ID: 5153
- Class: A
- ERP: 1,450 watts
- HAAT: 204 meters

Links
- Public license information: Public file; LMS
- Website: bbnradio.org

WYFC (95.3 FM) is a radio station licensed to Clinton, Tennessee, broadcasting to the Knoxville, Tennessee, area. It is an affiliate of the Bible Broadcasting Network in.

It was once known as a commercial Country radio station "WNKX-FM" (KIX 95) from 1982 to 1986 and a Contemporary Hit Radio station known as "95-3 WTNZ" (Power 95) from 1986 to 1989.
