= WXCZ =

- Cedar Key, Florida; United States
- Broadcast area: Levy County, Florida
- Frequency: 103.3 MHz
- Branding: Nature Coast Country

Programming
- Format: Country

Ownership
- Owner: Betty Marcocci; (WGUL-FM, Inc.)
- Sister stations: WZCC

History
- First air date: March 1996 (as WCQQ at 102.7)
- Former call signs: WVNM (1991–1995); WCQQ (1995–1996); WRGO (1996–2017)
- Former frequencies: 102.7 MHz (1996–2018)

Technical information
- Licensing authority: FCC
- Facility ID: 57563
- Class: C3
- ERP: 31,000 watts
- HAAT: 140 meters (459 ft)
- Transmitter coordinates: 29°11′45.00″N 82°59′46.00″W

Links
- Public license information: Public file; LMS
- Webcast: Listen Live
- Website: NatureCoastCountry.com

WXCZ (103.3 MHz) is a commercial FM radio station licensed to Cedar Key, Florida. The station is owned by Betty Marcocci, through licensee WGUL-FM, Inc., and features a country music radio format. It is simulcast on 104.3 WXZC in Inglis, Florida. The two stations call themselves "Nature Coast Country."

== History ==
The station was given a construction permit and was assigned the call letters WVNM on 1991-08-09. On 1995-08-01, the still-unbuilt station changed its call sign to WCQQ, on 1996-07-15 to WRGO, and on 2017-07-24 to the current WXCZ.

The station signed on the air in March 1996, as WCQQ, originally at 102.7 MHz. It was owned by Stoehr Communications and aired an oldies format. In the early 2010s, the station moved to 103.3 MHz.
