= WWFA =

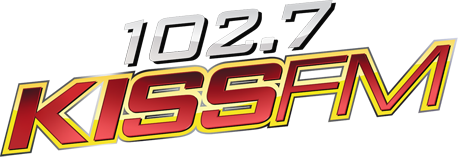
- St. Florian, Alabama; United States
- Broadcast area: Florence-Muscle Shoals Metropolitan Area
- Frequency: 102.7 MHz
- Branding: 102.7 Kiss FM

Programming
- Format: CHR/Top 40

Ownership
- Owner: Mike Brandt; (Southern Broadcasting LLC)
- Sister stations: WYDL, WWGM

History
- First air date: August 29, 2010

Technical information
- Licensing authority: FCC
- Facility ID: 171029
- Class: C3
- ERP: 10,000 watts
- HAAT: 141 meters (463 ft)
- Transmitter coordinates: 34°45′28″N 87°30′06″W

Links
- Public license information: Public file; LMS
- Webcast: Listen Live
- Website: kissfmbama.com

WWFA (102.7 FM, 102.7 Kiss FM) is a Top 40 (CHR) radio station licensed to serve St. Florian, Alabama and is owned by Mike Brandt, through licensee Southern Broadcasting LLC. WWFA serves the Muscle Shoals area, Northwest Alabama, parts of northeast Mississippi, and parts of southern middle Tennessee with an equivalent 25,000 watts of power (Class C3).

== History ==
=== WWFA/102.7 Kiss FM ===
WWFA signed on the air August 29, 2010 with a wall-to-wall Adult Album Alternative format with no station imaging except for a top-of-hour Legal ID.

This was merely a placeholder format for the station until it made its actual premiere on Friday evening, October 29, 2010 with a CHR/Top 40 format as 102.7 Kiss FM, taking on competitor Star 94 WMSR-FM. The first song played was "Like a G6" by Far East Movement. The station launched with the syndicated Elvis Duran and the Morning Show in mornings, On-Air With Ryan Seacrest middays, and Mike "TicTak" Brandt in afternoons.

In August 2015, the station dropped Elvis Duran in mornings for a locally hosted show by station Program Director and afternoon host, TicTak.
