= WPTM =

- Roanoke Rapids, North Carolina; United States
- Frequency: 102.3 MHz
- Branding: Maverick 102.3

Programming
- Format: Country music

Ownership
- Owner: John Byrne; (Byrne Acquisition Group, LLC)

Technical information
- Licensing authority: FCC
- Facility ID: 39676
- Class: A
- ERP: 6,000 watts
- HAAT: 96.5 meters (317 ft)
- Transmitter coordinates: 36°30′13″N 77°44′20″W

Links
- Public license information: Public file; LMS
- Website: maverick1023.com

WPTM (102.3 FM) is a radio station broadcasting a country music format. Licensed to Roanoke Rapids, North Carolina, United States, it serves that area along with Southside Virginia. The station is currently owned by John Byrne, through licensee Byrne Acquisition Group, LLC.
