= WWGM =

Classic Rock radio station in Selmer, Tennessee

- Selmer, Tennessee; United States
- Frequency: 93.9 MHz
- Branding: 939 The Fox

Programming
- Format: Classic Rock
- Affiliations: Compass Media Networks

Ownership
- Owner: Michael Brandt; (Southern Broadcasting LLC)
- Sister stations: WYDL, WWFA, WXWX, WWMR, WTKI, WSLV

History
- Former call signs: WSIB (1989–2018)

Technical information
- Licensing authority: FCC
- Facility ID: 71358
- Class: A
- ERP: 6,000 watts
- HAAT: 100.0 meters (328.1 ft)

Links
- Public license information: Public file; LMS
- Webcast: https://radio.securenetsystems.net/cwa/index.cfm?stationCallSign=WWGM

WWGM (93.9 FM, "939 The FOX") is a radio station broadcasting a Classic Rock format. Licensed to Selmer, Tennessee, United States, the station debuted a new format of rock music and rebranded itself as "939 The Fox". Programming is handled by Mike Brandt of Southern Broadcasting Corporation which also operates sister stations in Tennessee, Mississippi and Alabama. The station changed its call sign from WSIB to WWGM on January 9, 2018.
