= WSMY =

Radio station in Weldon, North Carolina

- Weldon, North Carolina; United States
- Frequency: 1400 kHz
- Branding: NBC Sports Radio 1400-1080

Programming
- Format: Sports

Ownership
- Owner: John Byrne; (Byrne Acquisition Group, LLC)
- Sister stations: WWDR

Technical information
- Licensing authority: FCC
- Facility ID: 39675
- Class: C
- Power: 1,000 watts
- Transmitter coordinates: 36°24′43″N 77°37′06″W
- Translator: 97.1 W246DQ (Weldon)
- Repeater: 1080 WWDR (Murfreesboro)

Links
- Public license information: Public file; LMS
- Website: www.ncsportsradio.com

WSMY (1400 AM) is a radio station broadcasting a sports format. It is licensed to Weldon, North Carolina, United States. The station is owned by John Byrne, through licensee Byrne Acquisition Group, LLC.

WSMY is an affiliate of the Wolfpack Sports Network.
