= WTRG =

- Gaston, North Carolina; United States
- Broadcast area: Roanoke Rapids, North Carolina
- Frequency: 97.9 MHz
- Branding: Magic 97.9

Programming
- Format: Classic hits
- Affiliations: Compass Media Networks

Ownership
- Owner: John Byrne; (Byrne Acquisition Group, LLC)

History
- First air date: 1988 (as WLGQ)
- Former call signs: WLGQ (1988–2003); WYTT (2003–2005)

Technical information
- Licensing authority: FCC
- Facility ID: 17568
- Class: A
- ERP: 1,350 watts
- HAAT: 149 meters (489 ft)
- Transmitter coordinates: 36°27′38″N 77°33′52″W

Links
- Public license information: Public file; LMS
- Webcast: Listen Live
- Website: www.magic979wtrg.com

WTRG (97.9 FM) is a classic hits formatted radio station licensed to Gaston, North Carolina, in the Roanoke Rapids market. WTRG is owned by John Byrne, through licensee Byrne Acquisition Group, LLC in Roanoke Rapids.

== History ==
This station was assigned call letters as WLGQ on August 5, 1988, which it held until switching to WYTT on January 17, 2003. It switched again, this time to current call sign WTRG, on January 10, 2005.

The WTRG call letters once belonged to 100.7 FM in the Raleigh–Durham area, whose city of license at the time was Rocky Mount, North Carolina. It first took the calls as an adult contemporary station, and kept them when it flipped to oldies as "Oldies 100.7" in 1989, finally giving them up in 2004 (the station is now known as WRDU).

On July 29, 2017, the station began "stunting" with continuous Christmas music. On August 2, 2017, WTRG relaunched as "Magic 97.9".

== Ownership ==
In July 2019, Byrne Acquisition Group purchased WTRG, along with 6 other stations and kept the "Magic 97.9" brand. The purchase was consummated on December 20, 2019. Barry Brown is the general manager and Allen Garrett became the operations manager of the station as of January 2020 and also took over the afternoon show.
