= WYSZ =

Christian rock radio station in Maumee, Ohio

Maumee, Ohio; United States
- Broadcast area: Toledo, Ohio
- Frequency: 89.3 MHz
- Branding: Yes FM

Programming
- Format: Christian contemporary hit radio and Christian dance music

Ownership
- Owner: Side by Side, Inc.

History
- First air date: November 14, 1992

Technical information
- Licensing authority: FCC
- Facility ID: 60276
- Class: A
- ERP: 2,700 watts
- HAAT: 74 meters (243 ft)
- Transmitter coordinates: 41°37′31.2″N 83°40′15.8″W

Links
- Public license information: Public file; LMS
- Webcast: Listen live
- Website: yeshome.com

WYSZ (89.3 FM) is a radio station licensed to Maumee, Ohio. It is the flagship for Yes FM, a non-profit, Christian contemporary hit radio station in Toledo, Ohio. WYSZ's tower is located near the intersection of Nebraska Avenue and McCord Road in Springfield Township, west of US 23.

== Simulcasts ==
Call sign	Frequency	City of license	FID	ERP (W)	HAAT	Class	Transmitter coordinates	FCC info
WYSA	88.5 FM	Wauseon, Ohio	60277	10,000	89 m (292 ft)	B1	41°33′29.2″N 84°11′7.8″W	LMS
WYSM	89.3 FM	Lima, Ohio	82006	3,000	67 m (220 ft)	A	40°39′15.2″N 84°6′35.8″W	LMS

Broadcast translator for WYSZ
Call sign	Frequency	City of license	FID	ERP (W)	Class	Transmitter coordinates	FCC info
W206BX	89.1 FM	Fremont, Ohio	60278	55	D	41°21′58.2″N 83°5′19.7″W	LMS
