= WDLZ =

- Murfreesboro, North Carolina; United States
- Broadcast area: The Roanoke-Chowan and Southside Virginia
- Frequency: 98.3 MHz
- Branding: Earl 98.3

Programming
- Format: Adult hits

Ownership
- Owner: John Byrne; (Byrne Acquisition Group, LLC)

History
- First air date: 1970 (as WWDR-FM)
- Former call signs: WWDR-FM (1970–1982); WBCG (1982–1997)

Technical information
- Licensing authority: FCC
- Facility ID: 56667
- Class: A
- ERP: 3,000 watts
- HAAT: 100 meters (330 ft)
- Transmitter coordinates: 36°26′24″N 77°08′10″W

Links
- Public license information: Public file; LMS
- Webcast: Listen Live
- Website: earl983.com

WDLZ (98.3 FM) is a radio station broadcasting an adult hits format. Licensed to Murfreesboro, North Carolina, United States, it serves Northeastern North Carolina and Southside Virginia. The station is currently owned by John Byrne, through licensee Byrne Acquisition Group, LLC.

In August 2018, WDLZ ended its satellite-delivered adult contemporary format. At 12:01 a.m. on August 2, 2018, "98.3 WDLZ" became known as "Earl 98.3" with an adult hits format. The station is managed by Jay Jenkins, who host the morning show. Earl 98.3 also broadcasts John Tesh's program "Intelligence For Your Life".
