= WYHA =

BBN radio station in Grand Rapids, Michigan

Coordinates: 42.954°N 85.699°W

- Grand Rapids, Michigan; United States
- Broadcast area: Grand Rapids metropolitan area
- Frequency: 102.9 MHz

Programming
- Format: Christian radio
- Network: Bible Broadcasting Network

Ownership
- Owner: Bible Broadcasting Network, Inc.

History
- First air date: 1960
- Former call signs: WFUR-FM (1960–2020)

Technical information
- Licensing authority: FCC
- Facility ID: 22918
- Class: B
- ERP: 50,000 watts
- HAAT: 150 meters (490 ft)

Links
- Public license information: Public file; LMS
- Website: bbn1.bbnradio.org/english/

WYHA (102.9 FM) is a radio station broadcasting the Bible Broadcasting Network in Grand Rapids, Michigan, United States.

== History ==
Originally WFUR-FM and the sister station to WFUR, the station was constructed on the AM tower site in 1960. The primary reason for construction of WFUR-FM was the early morning and night time audience that WFUR could not reach because at that time, WFUR was only allowed daylight operation (sunrise to sunset). WFUR-FM was the third FM station in the Grand Rapids market. Through the years, WFUR-FM increased power as opportunities became available. The final increase took place in 1983. Agreements were signed with other 102.9 FM stations in Ann Arbor and Milwaukee to accept any interference caused by each of them going to 50,000 watts. WFUR-FM constructed a new, taller 635-foot (194 m) with the antenna at a height above average terrain of 490 feet (150 m), and installed a new transmitter (Continental) at that time.

Effective May 11, 2020, WFUR-FM was sold to the Bible Broadcasting Network, and the station changed its call sign to WYHA. As WYHA began carrying Bible Broadcasting Network programming, its former programming continued to air on WFUR AM and its translator at 92.9 FM.
