= Bible Broadcasting Network =

American Christian radio network

- Type: Christian radio
- Country: United States
- Headquarters: Charlotte, North Carolina

Ownership
- Key people: Barbara Davey Redemann, President; Carl Redemann, Executive Director

History
- Founded: October 2, 1971 by Lowell Davey

Coverage
- Availability: North and South America

Links
- Webcast: Listen Live
- Website: bbn1.bbnradio.org

The Bible Broadcasting Network (BBN) is a listener-supported global Conservative Christian radio network staffed and headquartered in Charlotte, North Carolina. It was founded in 1971 by Lowell Davey, who was the network's president until his death in 2017. It remains under family control, with Davey's daughter Barbara Redemann and her husband Carl Redemann leading BBN.

BBN's mission statement is "to get the Word of God into the hearts and minds of as many people as possible using the most efficient means" and its motto is "Giving the Winds the Bible Voice". Doctrinally, the programming is conservative in approach.

Programming content consists of traditional Christian music, including vocalists, choirs, and instrumentalists; Bible teaching and sermons; prayer times; children's and teens' programs; and family guidance programs.

== Programs ==
Among the notable ministries having long-running programs on the network are: Running to Win and Moody Church Hour with Erwin Lutzer, Love Worth Finding by Adrian Rogers, Gateway to Joy by Elisabeth Elliot, and the Pacific Garden Mission's radio drama, Unshackled!. Reruns of the Children's Bible Hour and Sugar Creek Gang radio plays are heard daily on the afternoon Captain's Club program. Adventures in Odyssey, one of the most popular Christian radio shows in the U.S., is aired for teens and preteens.

== Founding ==
The network was founded in 1971 by Lowell Davey (July 22, 1933 – February 18, 2017). Hailing from Minnesota, he had previously served in the U.S. Air Force. Upon completing his enlistment, Davey attended Bob Jones University.

Davey entered the field of Christian radio broadcasting when he acquired a bankrupt radio station, WYFI, in Norfolk, Virginia, on March 28, 1969. The station began broadcasting under his ownership on October 2, 1971, at 5 p.m. BBN was still headquartered in Chesapeake, Virginia, when it bought Charlotte radio station WSOC (AM), which became WYFQ (AM).

== Stations ==
BBN owns and operates 58 full-power stations and 86 low-power translators in 32 states and Bermuda, distributed by satellite. According to the network's website, they also operate AM and FM radio stations in 14 countries of North and South America. BBN also broadcasts around the world full-time via streaming on the Internet in eight languages: English, Spanish, Portuguese, Mandarin Chinese, Korean, Japanese, German, and Russian.

Stations in italics are not owned by Bible Broadcasting Network, Inc., but broadcast BBN programming.

Call sign	Frequency	City of license	State	First air date	Power (W)	ERP (W)	Height (m (ft))	Class	Facility ID
WYFD	91.7 FM	Decatur	Alabama	December 17, 1990	—	9,000	240 m (790 ft)	C2	5118
WGTF	89.5 FM	Dothan	Alabama	December 15, 1981	—	19,000	64 m (210 ft)	C3	17356
WYFZ	91.3 FM	Belleview	Florida	November 18, 2005	—	900	97 m (318 ft)	A	76441
WYBP	90.3 FM	Fort Lauderdale	Florida	August 30, 2012	—	8,000	94 m (308 ft)	C3	72029
WYFB	90.5 FM	Gainesville	Florida	August 1, 1985	—	97,000	207 m (679 ft)	C1	5083
WYBW	88.7 FM	Key Colony Beach	Florida	March 20, 2013	—	400	28 m (92 ft)	A	175255
WYBX	88.3 FM	Key West	Florida	August 25, 2012	—	1,900	31 m (102 ft)	A	90786
WYFO	91.9 FM	Lakeland	Florida	November 7, 1989	—	25,000	97 m (318 ft)	C3	5116
WDBW-LP	97.3 FM	Port St. Joe	Florida	2002	—	94	30.6 m (100 ft)	LP1	134360
WYFE	88.9 FM	Tarpon Springs	Florida	September 1, 1989	—	60,000	137 m (449 ft)	C1	5173
WYFK	89.5 FM	Columbus	Georgia	July 29, 1987	—	50,000	134 m (440 ft)	C2	5144
WYFS	89.5 FM	Savannah	Georgia	November 10, 1986	—	100,000	183 m (600 ft)	C1	5163
WYFA	107.1 FM	Waynesboro	Georgia	September 23, 1985	—	25,000	90 m (300 ft)	C3	5167
WYFW	89.5 FM	Winder	Georgia	April 1993	—	6,000	61 m (200 ft)	A	5125
WYHI	99.9 FM	Park Forest	Illinois	June 12, 2018	—	50,000	150 m (490 ft)	B	23476
WYHX	96.3 FM	Indianapolis	Indiana	September 9, 2022	—	3,300	87 m (285 ft)	A	60207
WYBV	89.9 FM	Wakarusa	Indiana	May 24, 2006	—	1,750	100 m (330 ft)	A	88656
WYHN	90.1 FM	Washington	Indiana	June 27, 2023	—	420	38.7 m (127 ft)	A	762135
KYFW	88.3 FM	Wichita	Kansas	September 24, 1988	—	17,000	43 m (141 ft)	C3	5098
WYHH	89.7 FM	Highland Heights	Kentucky	August 25, 2017	—	12,000	97 m (318 ft)	C3	4280
KYFL	89.5 FM	Monroe	Louisiana	October 9, 1992	—	25,000	115 m (377 ft)	C2	5142
KYFJ	93.7 FM	New Iberia	Louisiana	December 17, 2014	—	100,000	296 m (971 ft)	C1	8167
WYFP	91.9 FM	Harpswell	Maine	December 15, 1997	—	6,000	44 m (144 ft)	A	17482
WYBA	90.1 FM	Coldwater	Michigan	July 15, 2008	—	32,000	77 m (253 ft)	B	121240
WYHA	102.9 FM	Grand Rapids	Michigan	June 28, 2020	—	50,000	150 m (490 ft)	B	22918
KYFI	630 AM	St. Louis	Missouri	September 25, 2013	5,000	—	—	B	73299
KYHK	89.5 FM	Kearney	Nebraska	July 20, 2013	—	1,000	106 m (348 ft)	A	762136
KYFG	88.9 FM	Omaha	Nebraska	1996	—	1,500	147 m (482 ft)	A	50311
KYBF	90.1 FM	Scottsbluff	Nebraska	July 23, 2023	—	920	62 m (203 ft)	A	762137
KYFV	107.1 FM	Albuquerque	New Mexico	June 19, 2021	—	24,500	215 m (705 ft)	C2	228
KYHA	88.1 FM	Clovis	New Mexico	April 20, 2024	—	1,000	62 m (203 ft)	A	762138
WYHW	104.5 FM	Carolina Beach	North Carolina	December 1, 2015	—	17,000	120 m (390 ft)	C3	74159
WYFQ	930 AM	Charlotte	North Carolina	March 16, 1992	5,000 day 1,000 night	—	—	B	5152
WYBH	91.1 FM	Fayetteville	North Carolina	unknown	—	255	195 m (640 ft)	A	85067
WYFL	92.5 FM	Henderson	North Carolina	October 3, 1981	—	100,000	308 m (1,010 ft)	C0	5100
WHPE-FM	95.5 FM	High Point	North Carolina	October 14, 1974	—	100,000	159 m (522 ft)	C1	5164
WYHG	93.5 FM	Wadesboro	North Carolina	February 12, 1996	—	8,700	169 m (554 ft)	C3	73965
WCVV	89.5 FM	Belpre	Ohio	unknown	—	4,400	117 m (384 ft)	A	4640
WYFY	88.1 FM	Cambridge	Ohio	unknown	—	1,500	44 m (144 ft)	A	172915
WYBQ	88.3 FM	Leesport	Pennsylvania	August 2, 2013	—	670	84 m (276 ft)	A	175920
WYFU	88.5 FM	Masontown	Pennsylvania	1998	—	16,000	106 m (348 ft)	B1	81152
WYFV	88.5 FM	Cayce	South Carolina	October 10, 1990	—	50,000	52 m (171 ft)	C2	5101
WYFG	91.1 FM	Gaffney	South Carolina	October 12, 1982	—	100,000	210 m (690 ft)	C1	5132
WYFH	90.7 FM	North Charleston	South Carolina	July 7, 1984	—	50,000	145 m (476 ft)	C2	5095
WYBK	89.7 FM	Chattanooga	Tennessee	November 18, 2010	—	100,000	250 m (820 ft)	C1	65216
WYFC	95.3 FM	Clinton	Tennessee	October 12, 1989	—	1,450	204 m (669 ft)	A	5153
WYFN	980 AM	Nashville	Tennessee	April 15, 1991	5,000	—	—	B	8725
KYFB	91.5 FM	Denison	Texas	January 19, 2007	—	4,500	67 m (220 ft)	A	85512
KYFP	89.1 FM	Palestine	Texas	May 15, 2000	—	100,000	148 m (486 ft)	C1	85164
KYBP	90.1 FM	Paris	Texas	May 24, 2024	—	250	130 m (430 ft)	A	762139
KYFS	90.9 FM	San Antonio	Texas	April 9, 1992	—	100,000	130 m (430 ft)	C1	5115
KYFO-FM	95.5 FM	Ogden	Utah	April 23, 1994	—	100,000	219 m (719 ft)	C1	5176
WYFJ	99.9 FM	Ashland	Virginia	February 1, 1980	—	6,000	100 m (330 ft)	A	5096
WYFT	103.9 FM	Luray	Virginia	January 12, 1987	—	6,000	92 m (302 ft)	A	5110
WYFI	99.7 FM	Norfolk	Virginia	October 2, 1971	—	50,000	139 m (456 ft)	B	5143
KWFJ	89.7 FM	Roy	Washington	unknown	—	1,000	30 m (98 ft)	A	8393
KYFQ	91.7 FM	Tacoma	Washington	May 13, 2015	—	4,300	582 m (1,909 ft)	C1	62470

=== Translators ===
In addition to its full-power stations, BBN is relayed by 87 translators to widen its broadcast area.

Call sign	Frequency (MHz)	City of license	State	FCC info
W269AX	101.7	Anniston	Alabama	FCC (W269AX)
W280DA	103.9	Florence	Alabama	FCC (W280DA)
W230AV	93.9	Gadsden	Alabama	FCC (W230AV)
K218CV	91.5	Springerville	Arizona	FCC (K218CV)
K286AQ	105.1	El Dorado	Arkansas	FCC (K286AQ)
K219LZ	91.7	Springdale	Arkansas	FCC (K219LZ)
W219BZ	91.7	Lewes	Delaware	FCC (W219BZ)
W265BJ	100.9	Crystal River	Florida	FCC (W265BJ)
W241BP	96.1	Kissimmee	Florida	FCC (W241BP)
W257BF	99.3	Leesburg	Florida	FCC (W257BF)
W249CH	97.7	Palm Coast	Florida	FCC (W249CH)
W247AF	97.3	Sarasota	Florida	FCC (W247AF)
W260CA	99.9	Sebring	Florida	FCC (W260CA)
W228BK	93.5	Union Park	Florida	FCC (W228BK)
W224CQ	92.7	Winter Garden	Florida	FCC (W224CQ)
W273AE	102.5	Albany	Georgia	FCC (W273AE)
W293CH	106.5	Brunswick	Georgia	FCC (W293CH)
W245CN	96.9	Griffin	Georgia	FCC (W245CN)
W282AE	104.3	Macon	Georgia	FCC (W282AE)
W209AY	89.7	Jasper	Indiana	FCC (W209AY)
W209CL	89.7	Washington	Indiana	FCC (W209CL)
K207EX	89.3	Marshalltown	Iowa	FCC (K207EX)
K258AE	99.5	Hutchinson	Kansas	FCC (K258AE)
K204CR	88.7	McPherson	Kansas	FCC (K204CR)
K281CD	104.1	Newton	Kansas	FCC (K281CD)
W202AZ	88.3	Frankfort	Kentucky	FCC (W202AZ)
K217FD	91.3	Alexandria	Louisiana	FCC (K217FD)
K290AL	105.9	Minden	Louisiana	FCC (K290AL)
W248CB	97.5	Augusta	Maine	FCC (W248CB)
W277AM	103.3	Portland	Maine	FCC (W277AM)
W286CU	105.1	Saco	Maine	FCC (W286CU)
W218AY	91.5	Laurel	Mississippi	FCC (W218AY)
K204CS	88.7	Poplar Bluff	Missouri	
K212GG	90.3	Grand Island	Nebraska	FCC (K212GG)
W220EL	91.9	Jamestown	New York	FCC (W220EL)
W216CG	91.1	Pottersville	New York	FCC (W216CG)
W274BV	102.7	Boone	North Carolina	FCC (W274BV)
W229CF	93.7	Charlotte	North Carolina	FCC (W229CF)
W255BE	98.9	Fuquay-Varina	North Carolina	FCC (W255BE)
W287AI	105.3	Goldsboro	North Carolina	FCC (W287AI)
W287AH	105.3	Greenville	North Carolina	FCC (W287AH)
W269CW	101.7	Hendersonville	North Carolina	FCC (W269CW)
W240AW	95.9	Kinston	North Carolina	FCC (W240AW)
W280EP	103.9	Lumberton	North Carolina	FCC (W280EP)
W290AD	105.9	Southern Pines	North Carolina	FCC (W290AD)
W220DL	91.9	Statesville	North Carolina	FCC (W220DL)
K204FG	88.7	Bismarck	North Dakota	FCC (K204FG)
W210BG	89.9	Ashland	Ohio	FCC (W210BG)
W207CC	89.3	New Philadelphia	Ohio	FCC (W207CC)
W202AW	88.3	Sandusky	Ohio	FCC (W202AW)
W218BL	91.5	Willard	Ohio	FCC (W218BL)
W218CP	91.5	Wooster	Ohio	FCC (W218CP)
K278AF	103.5	Ponca City	Oklahoma	FCC (K278AF)
W219DB	91.7	Johnstown	Pennsylvania	FCC (W219DB)
W247BR	97.3	Anderson	South Carolina	FCC (W247BR)
W260AK	99.9	Georgetown	South Carolina	FCC (W260AK)
W223BG	92.5	Lugoff	South Carolina	FCC (W223BG)
W241BI	96.1	Orangeburg	South Carolina	FCC (W241BI)
W222CV	92.3	Rock Hill	South Carolina	FCC (W222CV)
W242AH	96.3	Sumter	South Carolina	FCC (W242AH)
W220EE	91.9	Columbia	Tennessee	FCC (W220EE)
W202BG	88.3	Dyersburg	Tennessee	FCC (W202BG)
W229AK	93.7	LaFollette	Tennessee	FCC (W229AK)
W286AG	105.1	Morristown	Tennessee	FCC (W286AG)
W210BO	89.9	Tullahoma	Tennessee	FCC (W210BO)
W239AE	95.7	Winchester	Tennessee	FCC (W239AE)
K218EB	91.5	Greenville	Texas	FCC (K218EB)
K203EQ	88.5	Lufkin	Texas	FCC (K203EQ)
K217FQ	91.3	Centerville	Utah	FCC (K217FQ)
K231CD	94.1	Smithfield	Utah	FCC (K231CD)
W218CQ	91.5	Accomac	Virginia	FCC (W218CQ)
W296AM	107.1	Bassett	Virginia	FCC (W296AM)
W240AF	95.9	Charlottesville	Virginia	FCC (W240AF)
W208BN	89.5	Christiansburg	Virginia	FCC (W208BN)
W224AF	92.7	Danville	Virginia	FCC (W224AF)
W261AI	100.1	Fairlawn	Virginia	FCC (W261AI)
W204CH	88.7	Fredericksburg	Virginia	FCC (W204CH)
W293BQ	106.5	Harrisonburg	Virginia	FCC (W293BQ)
W249AL	97.7	Pulaski	Virginia	FCC (W249AL)
W261AH	100.1	Radford	Virginia	FCC (W261AH)
W253BE	98.5	Salem	Virginia	FCC (W253BE)
W268AC	101.5	Waynesboro	Virginia	FCC (W268AC)
W267AK	101.3	Winchester	Virginia	FCC (W267AK)
W224AE	92.7	Wytheville	Virginia	FCC (W224AE)
W209AX	89.7	Fairmont	West Virginia	FCC (W209AX)
W244BB	96.7	Princeton	West Virginia	FCC (W244BB)
K217EY	91.3	Laramie	Wyoming	FCC (K217EY)
