= 95.3 FM =

FM radio frequency

The following radio stations broadcast on FM frequency 95.3 MHz:

== Argentina ==
- 95.3 Ayacucho in Ayacucho, Buenos Aires
- Acción
- Atlántida in Buenos Aires
- Cadena Vida in San Juan
- Capital in Corrientes
- Cielo in Posadas, Misiones
- Contacto in José C. Paz, Buenos Aires
- Horizonte in Entre Ríos
- Ilusiones in Tres Arroyos, Buenos Aires
- Impacto in Villa Gobernador Gálvez, Santa Fe
- La 95 in Ayacucho, Buenos Aires
- Laguna del Plata in La Para, Córdoba
- Metro Mendoza in Mendoza
- Neo in Oberá, Misiones
- Original in Helvecia, Santa Fe
- Radio Con Vos Mar del Plata in Mar del Plata, Buenos Aires
- Radio María in 25 de Mayo, Buenos Aires
- Radio María in San Nicolás de los Arroyos, Buenos Aires
- Radio María in Reducción, Córdoba
- Radio María in Santa Rosa de Calamuchita, Córdoba
- Radio María in Concordia, Entre Ríos
- Tropical Latina in Villa de Merlo, San Luis
- SOFIA in La Plata, Buenos Aires
- Sol in Diamante, Entre Ríos
- Volver in Chascomus, Buenos Aires
- X4 in Laprida, Buenos Aires

== Australia ==
- Radio National in Cooma, New South Wales
- Smooth 95.3 in Sydney, New South Wales
- ABC Classic in Grafton, New South Wales
- Triple M Goulburn Valley in Shepparton, Victoria
- Coast FM 95.3 in Warrnambool, Victoria
- Hit Western Australia in Albany, Western Australia
- 6EBA-FM in Perth, Western Australia

== Canada (Channel 237) ==
- CBAL-FM-2 in Lameque, New Brunswick
- CBNQ-FM in Trepassey, Newfoundland and Labrador
- CBTH-FM in Terrace, British Columbia
- CBUB-FM in Osoyoos, British Columbia
- CBVM-FM in Iles-de-la-Madeleine, Quebec
- CBVX-FM in Quebec City, Quebec
- CBZW-FM in Woodstock, New Brunswick
- CFGW-FM-1 in Swan River, Manitoba
- CFWH-FM-1 in Whitehorse, Yukon
- CFYK-FM in Yellowknife, Northwest Territories
- CHOE-FM in Matane, Quebec
- CHUT-FM in Lac-Simon, Quebec
- CHXL-FM in Okanese Indian Reserve, Saskatchewan
- CIFM-FM-6 in Cache Creek, British Columbia
- CING-FM in Hamilton, Ontario
- CINI-FM in Mistassini, Quebec
- CISE-FM-1 in Caron, Saskatchewan
- CJRG-FM-4 in L'Anse-a-Valleau, Quebec
- CJXK-FM in Cold Lake, Alberta
- CKZX-FM-1 in Kaslo, British Columbia
- CKZZ-FM in Vancouver, British Columbia
- VF7284 in Ste Rose du Lac, Manitoba

== China ==
- CNR The Voice of China in Baoji
- GRT Finance Radio in Guangzhou

== Democratic Republic of the Congo ==
- Radio de la Femme in Kinshasa from 2020

== Greece ==
- viva fm 95.3 1 from Ptolemaida

== Malaysia ==
- Nasional FM in Selangor and Western Pahang

== Mexico ==
- XHAOP-FM in Acatlán de Osorio, Puebla
- XHCOB-FM in Ciudad Obregón, Sonora
- XHDCH-FM in Santa Ana (Ciudad Delicias), Chihuahua
- XHEJU-FM in Ejutla de Crespo, Oaxaca
- XHEVP-FM in Acapulco, Guerrero
- XHGN-FM in Piedras Negras, Veracruz
- XHHIT-FM in Tecate, Baja California
- XHIN-FM in Culiacán, Sinaloa
- XHJR-FM in Petatlán, Guerrero
- XHKM-FM in Minatitlán, Veracruz
- XHLPZ-FM in Lampazos, Nuevo León
- XHLRS-FM in Villagrán, Tamaulipas
- XHMAC-FM in Manzanillo, Colima
- XHMH-FM in Mérida, Yucatán
- XHNB-FM in San Luis Potosí, San Luis Potosí
- XHOX-FM in Tampico, Tamaulipas
- XHPEDJ-FM in Encarnación de Díaz, Jalisco
- XHPFRT-FM in El Fuerte, Sinaloa
- XHPSAL-FM in Salina Cruz, Oaxaca
- XHPXIC-FM in Xicotepec de Juárez, Puebla
- XHPY-FM in Tepic, Nayarit
- XHRCB-FM in Iguala, Guerrero
- XHROO-FM in Chetumal, Quintana Roo
- XHRT-FM in Reynosa, Tamaulipas
- XHSH-FM in Mexico City
- XHSJB-FM in San Juan Bautista Valle Nacional, Oaxaca
- XHUK-FM in Caborca, Sonora
- XHWM-FM in San Cristóbal de las Casas, Chiapas

== Philippines ==
- DWKS in Daet

== Serbia ==
- Radio Belgrade 1 from the Avala Tower

== United States (Channel 237) ==
- KBBN in Broken Bow, Nebraska
- KBHH in Kerman, California
- KBKR-FM in Baker, Oregon
- KCDQ in Douglas, Arizona
- KCPZ-LP in Kansas City, Missouri
- KCSI in Red Oak, Iowa
- KCXY in East Camden, Arkansas
- KDDD in Dumas, Texas
- KDJS-FM in Willmar, Minnesota
- KDKD in Clinton, Missouri
- KECH in Sun Valley, Idaho
- KELW in Gilmer, Texas
- KEPH-LP in Friendswood, Texas
- KERC-LP in Kermit, Texas
- KERX in Paris, Arkansas
- KEWZ-LP in West Monroe, Louisiana
- KGSL in Winona, Minnesota
- KHCA in Wamego, Kansas
- KHYI in Howe, Texas
- KIFG in Iowa Falls, Iowa
- KINZ in Humboldt, Kansas
- KJJB in Eagle Lake, Texas
- KJLV in Los Gatos, California
- KKWZ in Rugby, North Dakota
- KLCR in Lakeview, Oregon
- KLLY in Oildale, California
- KLXS in Pierre, South Dakota
- KMGZ in Lawton, Oklahoma
- KNEL-FM in Brady, Texas
- KNOF in Saint Paul, Minnesota
- KOJP in Presidio, Texas
- KORG-LP in Cleveland, Texas
- KOZT in Fort Bragg, California
- KPND in Deer Park, Washington
- KQKI-FM in Bayou Vista, Louisiana
- KQKL in Keokuk, Iowa
- KQMG-FM in Independence, Iowa
- KRJC in Elko, Nevada
- KRPX in Wellington, Utah
- KSIK-LP in Greeley, Colorado
- KTQA-LP in Tacoma, Washington
- KTTF-LP in Tomball, Texas
- KUIC in Vacaville, California
- KUJZ in Creswell, Oregon
- KURY-FM in Brookings, Oregon
- KVHU in Judsonia, Arkansas
- KVWG in Dilley, Texas
- KWKN in Wakeeney, Kansas
- KXDM-LP in Worland, Wyoming
- KXLE in Ellensburg, Washington
- KXMO-FM in Owensville, Missouri
- KXTZ in Pismo Beach, California
- KXXK in Hoquiam, Washington
- KYDN in Monte Vista, Colorado
- KYFC-LP in El Centro, California
- KZJH in Jackson, Wyoming
- KZLD-LP in Houston, Texas
- WADI in Corinth, Mississippi
- WALV-FM in Ooltewah, Tennessee
- WALZ in Machias, Maine
- WBCK in Battle Creek, Michigan
- WBEV-FM in Beaver Dam, Wisconsin
- WBKT in Norwich, New York
- WBLJ in Shamokin, Pennsylvania
- WBPE in Brookston, Indiana
- WCFX in Clare, Michigan
- WDNH-FM in Honesdale, Pennsylvania
- WEBL in Coldwater, Mississippi
- WEGG in Bowman, Georgia
- WFBR-LP in Mount Washington, Kentucky
- WFFN in Coaling, Alabama
- WFRK in Quinby, South Carolina
- WGMO in Spooner, Wisconsin
- WGVS in Whitehall, Michigan
- WHFM in Southampton, New York
- WHGE-LP in Wilmington, Delaware
- WHLF in South Boston, Virginia
- WHMA-FM in Alexandria, Alabama
- WHRB at Cambridge, Massachusetts
- WIKI in Carrollton, Kentucky
- WJEK in Rantoul, Illinois
- WJEW-LP in Miami, Florida
- WJPA in Washington, Pennsylvania
- WJTB-FM in South Congaree, South Carolina
- WKDB in Laurel, Delaware
- WKHK in Colonial Heights, Virginia
- WKLM in Millersburg, Ohio
- WKTN in Kenton, Ohio
- WKVN in Morganfield, Kentucky
- WLFK in Gouverneur, New York
- WLHN-LP in Brandenburg, Kentucky
- WLJM-LP in Miami Beach, Florida
- WLKR in Norwalk, Ohio
- WLKW in Celoron, New York
- WMJB in Valley, Alabama
- WMNH-LP in Manchester, New Hampshire
- WNDI-FM in Sullivan, Indiana
- WNLA-FM in Drew, Mississippi
- WNOZ-LP in New Orleans, Louisiana
- WOBR in Wanchese, North Carolina
- WOLZ in Fort Myers, Florida
- WPVQ in Greenfield, Massachusetts
- WPYO in Maitland, Florida
- WQTE in Adrian, Michigan
- WRHR-LP in Corbin, Kentucky
- WRKX in Ottawa, Illinois
- WRLB in Rainelle, West Virginia
- WRSC-FM in Bellefonte, Pennsylvania
- WRTB in Winnebago, Illinois
- WRXX in Centralia, Illinois
- WTBG in Brownsville, Tennessee
- WTBU in York Center, Maine
- WTRC-FM in Niles, Michigan
- WTTC in Towanda, Pennsylvania
- WUME-FM in Paoli, Indiana
- WVKV in Nashville, Georgia
- WVRB in Wilmore, Kentucky
- WWMD-LP in Ashland, Wisconsin
- WWOK-LP in Greenville, South Carolina
- WWOO in Dillsboro, North Carolina
- WWSS in Tuscarora Township, Michigan
- WWWA in Winslow, Maine
- WXBX in Rural Retreat, Virginia
- WXCV in Homosassa Springs, Florida
- WXEI-LP in Crestview, Florida
- WXLF in White River Junction, Vermont
- WYFC in Clinton, Tennessee
- WZLR in Xenia, Ohio
- WZNF in Lumberton, Mississippi
- WZRV in Front Royal, Virginia
