= WABY (disambiguation) =

WABY is a radio station (900 AM) licensed to Watervliet, New York.

WABY may also refer to:

- WSSV, a radio station (1160 AM) licensed to Mechanicville, New York, which held the call sign WABY from 2002 to 2014
- WAMC (AM), a radio station (1400 AM) licensed to Albany, New York, which held the call sign WABY from 1934 to 2002
