= 900 AM =

AM radio frequency 900 kHz

The following radio stations broadcast on AM frequency 900 kHz: 900 AM is a Mexican and Canadian clear channel frequency. XEW Mexico City and CKBI Prince Albert, Saskatchewan, share Class A status on 900 kHz.

Because 900 kHz is a multiple of both 9 and 10, the frequency is available for use by broadcast stations in all three ITU regions.

== Argentina ==
- LT7 in Corrientes
- Radio Municipal in 25 de Mayo

== Australia ==
- VL2LT at Lithgow, New South Wales

== Barbados ==
- 8PX-AM in Bridgetown

== Bolivia (audible in northern Chile) ==
- CP-128 (900) in Cochabamba
- CP-083 (900) in Montero
- CP-079 (900) in Tarija

== Cameroon ==
- AM 900 in Yaoundé

== Canada ==
Stations in bold are clear-channel stations.

Call sign	City of license	Daytime power (kW)	Nighttime power (kW)	Transmitter coordinates
CBRK	Kimberley, British Columbia	0.04	0.04	49.680278°N 115.976389°W
**CKBI**	Prince Albert, Saskatchewan	10	10	53.2008°N 105.7538°W

== Chile ==
- W Radio 090 – Santiago.

== China ==
- BEN42 in Datong
- BET8 in Jiamusi
- CNR The Voice of China in Benxi urban area and Jiangmen
- CNR Business Radio
- CRI News Radio in Beijing
- SZMG News Radio in Shenzhen

=== Macau ===
- XXAA-AM in Macau

== Denmark ==
=== Greenland ===
- OYJ in Umanaq

== Guatemala (Channel 37) ==
- TGMA in Puerto Barrios

== Indonesia ==
- PM4... in Banyumas
- PM3B... in Cianjur
- PM2B... in Jakarta
- PM8C... in Kalianda
- PM8BYN in Kediri
- PM3C.... in Medan
- PM5CHA in Padang
- PM2DRO in Sanggau
- PM4... in Sukorejo
- PM2D... in Sumbawa
- PM6CJG in Sungaipenuh
- PM6... in Surabaya
- PM2CRR in Tonjong Lhoknga

== Iran ==
- Radio Quran in Tehran

== Italy ==
- I1MI in Milan / Siziano

== Japan ==
- JOHO in Hakodate, Hokkaido (Transmitting station is in the Hokuto.)
- JOHF in Yonago, Tottori
- JOZR (RKC Kochi Broadcasting) in Kōchi, Kōchi

== Mexico ==
Stations in bold are clear-channel stations.

- **XEW-AM** in Mexico City, Distrito Federal – 100 kW, transmitter located at 19.36505°N 98.957703°W

== New Zealand ==
- ZL4YC in Otago / Highcliff, Shiel Hill

== Papua New Guinea ==
- P2GR in Goroka

== Philippines ==
- DXRZ in Zamboanga
- DYOW in Roxas

== Russian Federation ==
- RW61 in Sovetskiy

== Spain ==
- EAK13 in Bilbao
- EAK57 in Cáceres
- EAK39 in Granada
- EAK33 in Vigo

== United States ==
Call sign	City of license	Facility ID	Class	Daytime power (kW)	Nighttime power (kW)	Unlimited power (kW)	Transmitter coordinates
KALI	West Covina, California	56779	D	5	0.15		34.03°N 117.726389°W
KBIF	Fresno, California	9226	B	1	0.5		36.691667°N 119.679444°W
KFAL	Fulton, Missouri	34409	D	1	0.135		38.866111°N 91.954167°W
KFLP	Floydada, Texas	57026	D	0.25	0.007		33.972222°N 101.35°W
KHOZ	Harrison, Arkansas	26234	D	1	0.062		36.243056°N 93.111944°W
KJSK	Columbus, Nebraska	26628	D	1	0.065		41.439722°N 97.390278°W
KKRT	Wenatchee, Washington	28634	D	1	0.072		47.462222°N 120.357778°W
KMVI	Kahului, Hawaii	9678	B	5	5		20.791667°N 156.466944°W
KPYN	Atlanta, Texas	2766	D	1	0.033		33.082778°N 94.182778°W
KREH	Pecan Grove, Texas	71631	D	5	0.01		29.643889°N 96.096111°W
KSGL	Wichita, Kansas	610	D	0.25	0.028		37.6925°N 97.381667°W
KTIS	Minneapolis, Minnesota	49770	B	50	0.5		44.99°N 92.981111°W
KZPA	Fort Yukon, Alaska	25701	B			5	66.556667°N 145.201111°W
WABY	Watervliet, New York	72620	D	0.4	0.07		42.689167°N 73.793611°W
WACA	Laurel, Maryland	28279	B	1.9	0.5		39.0825°N 76.838611°W
WATK	Antigo, Wisconsin	433	D	0.25	0.195		45.106389°N 89.1525°W
WATV	Birmingham, Alabama	5356	D	0.845	0.158		33.536389°N 86.884167°W
WAYN	Rockingham, North Carolina	71152	B	1	0.297		34.925°N 79.743056°W
WBRV	Boonville, New York	3198	D	1	0.052		43.513056°N 75.362778°W
WCBX	Bassett, Virginia	18887	D	1.1	0.18		36.71°N 79.966111°W
WCME	Brunswick, Maine	56570	D	0.7	0.026		43.911389°N 70.024722°W
WCPA	Clearfield, Pennsylvania	11982	B	2.5	0.5		41.042222°N 78.448333°W
WDLS	Wisconsin Dells, Wisconsin	2807	D	1	0.22		43.638056°N 89.721111°W
WFIA	Louisville, Kentucky	55504	D	0.93	0.162		38.265833°N 85.713889°W
WGHM	Nashua, New Hampshire	41256	D	0.91	0.06		42.759444°N 71.476944°W
WGOK	Mobile, Alabama	56716	B	1	0.38		30.708611°N 88.064722°W
WIAM	Williamston, North Carolina	37450	B	1	0.258		35.8575°N 77.042778°W
WJTH	Calhoun, Georgia	10067	B	1	0.266		34.461111°N 84.895556°W
WJWL	Georgetown, Delaware	25007	D	1	0.145		38.707222°N 75.405278°W
WKDA	Lebanon, Tennessee	71289	D	5	0.136		36.206667°N 86.267222°W
WKDW	Staunton, Virginia	11666	D	2.5	0.12		38.175556°N 79.07°W
WKXV	Knoxville, Tennessee	54446	B	1	0.258		35.981111°N 83.9875°W
WLSI	Pikeville, Kentucky	38388	D	3.5	0.125		37.465833°N 82.551111°W
WMOP	Ocala, Florida	73278	D	2.7	0.023		29.237778°N 82.121111°W
WNMB	North Myrtle Beach, South Carolina	49985	D	0.25	0.08		33.823889°N 78.766389°W
WOZK	Ozark, Alabama	51092	D	1	0.07		31.455278°N 85.682778°W
WSWN	Belle Glade, Florida	59660	D	1	0.022		26.711944°N 80.683056°W
WURD	Philadelphia, Pennsylvania	52442	D	1.06	0.124		39.917222°N 75.221667°W
WYCV	Granite Falls, North Carolina	22552	D	2.5	0.251		35.786111°N 81.416667°W
WYPZ	Macon, Georgia	71216	D	2	0.145		32.849444°N 83.601667°W
