= WXLJ =

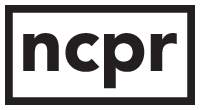
- Whitehall, New York; United States
- Broadcast area: Eastern New York, Western Vermont
- Frequency: 94.1 MHz
- Branding: North Country Public Radio

Programming
- Format: Public radio

Ownership
- Owner: The St. Lawrence University

History
- First air date: July 14, 1990
- Former call signs: WNYV (1988–2024)

Technical information
- Licensing authority: FCC
- Facility ID: 52637
- Class: A
- ERP: 3,000 watts
- HAAT: 100 meters (330 ft)
- Transmitter coordinates: 43°28′37.2″N 73°26′54.4″W

Links
- Public license information: Public file; LMS
- Webcast: Listen live (M3U); Listen live (PLS)
- Website: www.northcountrypublicradio.org

WXLJ (94.1 FM) is a public radio station licensed to Whitehall, New York, United States, serving the Saratoga Springs, New York, area. The station is owned by The St. Lawrence University, and is an affiliate of their North Country Public Radio network. WXLJ's signal covers Glens Falls, Queensbury, parts of Saratoga, and parts of western Vermont. A small mountain range inhibits the signal from reaching clearly into Rutland.

== History ==
In November 1988, Michael and Barbara Leech's Pine Tree Broadcasting Company, owners of WVNR (1340 AM) in Poultney, obtained the construction permit for an FM radio station in Whitehall, New York, to be operated in conjunction with WVNR. The new station, WNYV, went on the air July 14, 1990. WNYV and WVNR were simulcast 100% of the time.

On May 5, 2020, it was announced that WNYV and WVNR had been sold to Loud Media pending Federal Communications Commission (FCC) approval; at the time of the sale, the simulcast featured a classic hits format branded as "Lakes Region Radio". On July 25, 2020, Loud Media rebranded the station as "K94.1" playing classic country. The new format and branding replicated its sister station in Nunn, Colorado, K96.9 KYAP. On December 9, 2020, WNYV began simulcasting on WABY in Watervliet, New York, and W231DU in Albany, New York; this simulcast ended in March 2023. WVNR ceased operations in 2022.

On November 7, 2023, Loud Media filed an application with the FCC to transfer the broadcast license of WNYV to St. Lawrence University, who began operating the station as North Country Public Radio via a local marketing agreement on November 13. The sale of the license, at a price of $50,000, was consummated on March 13, 2024. The station changed its call sign from WNYV to WXLJ on April 1, 2024.

== See also ==
- WVNR
