= WVNR =

- Poultney, Vermont; United States
- Broadcast area: Rutland, Vermont
- Frequency: 1340 kHz
- Branding: K94.1

Programming
- Format: Classic country

Ownership
- Owner: Loud Media LLC
- Sister stations: WNYV

History
- First air date: August 1, 1981
- Last air date: July 1, 2022

Technical information
- Facility ID: 52636
- Class: C
- Power: 1,000 watts (unlimited)
- Transmitter coordinates: 43°30′16.0″N 73°12′38.8″W
- Translator: 96.3 W242DF (Poultney)

WVNR (1340 AM) was a radio station licensed to serve Poultney, Vermont. The station was owned by Loud Media. It aired a classic country music format. WVNR and its FM counterpart, 94.1 WNYV in Whitehall, New York, were simulcast 100% of the time.

== History ==
The WVNR call sign was assigned by the Federal Communications Commission (FCC) on February 5, 1981. The station went on the air August 1, 1981, under the ownership of Vermont–NY Broadcasting, a partnership of Norval Ramson, Richard Ramson, and Donald Prescott. WVNR was acquired by John Colagrande and Burton Barlow on September 7, 1982, with Michael Tatko taking a stake in the station in November 1984. Michael and Barbara Leech's Pine Tree Broadcasting Company took over the station on March 10, 1986. In November 1988, Pine Tree Broadcasting obtained the construction permit for an FM radio station in Whitehall, New York, to be operated in conjunction with WVNR; the new station, WNYV, went on the air in 1990.

On May 5, 2020, it was announced that WVNR and WNYV had been sold to Loud Media; at the time of the sale, the simulcast featured a classic hits format branded as "Lakes Region Radio". On July 25, 2020, Loud Media rebranded the stations as "K94.1", playing classic country. The new format and branding replicated its sister station in Nunn, Colorado, K96.9 KYAP.

WVNR left the air July 1, 2022. On June 20, 2023, Loud Media surrendered the licenses for WVNR and translator W242DF after selling the tower and land in 2022. The FCC cancelled the licenses on June 21, 2023.

== Translator ==
Call sign	Frequency	City of license	FID	ERP (W)	Class	Transmitter coordinates	FCC info
W242DF	96.3 FM	Poultney, Vermont	202352	99	D	43°30′16.7″N 73°12′36.7″W	LMS

== See also ==
- WXLJ
