= Bosnian Australians =

Bosnian Australians Bosanski Australijanci

Total population
- 28,238 (by ancestry, 2021); 26,174 (by birth, 2021)

Regions with significant populations
- Sydney, Melbourne, Brisbane, Adelaide, Perth, Gold Coast

Languages
- Australian English, Bosnian, Serbian and Croatian

Religion
- Predominantly Sunni Islam

Related ethnic groups
- Bosnian Americans, Bosnian diaspora, European Australians

Bosnian Australians are Australians of Bosnian ancestry. In the 2021 Australian census, 28,238 people stated that they had Bosnian ancestry and 26,174 Australian residents were born in Bosnia and Herzegovina.

The distribution of Bosnian immigrants in Sydney as a percentage of the population

== History ==
There have been three major influxes of Bosnians to Australia. The first period occurred in the aftermath of World War II, and the second occurred in the late 1960s/early 1970s following an economic depression and open border policy in the former Yugoslavia.

Bosnian migrants who arrived in Australia in the 1960s made important contributions to modern-day Australia through their role in the construction of the Snowy Mountains Scheme in New South Wales.

The most recent wave of migration was during the 1990s when many Bosnians sought refuge from the Bosnian War. This migration was assisted under the refugee scheme of the Australian Red Cross.

By 1996, a year after the Bosnian War had ended, almost 14,000 migrants from Bosnia and Herzegovina were living in Australia. Most of the new arrivals settled in Victoria and Bosnia and Herzegovina was the fifth-largest source of migrants to Victoria in 1995-96.

By 2021, Victoria was home to 10,011 people from Bosnia and Herzegovina, with a predominant concentration in the Dandenong area.

== Demographics ==
The majority of Bosnians reside in the south-east and west of Melbourne, south-west of Sydney and the southside of Brisbane. The Bosnian community in Queensland is more widely distributed with a significant community on the Gold Coast in the Southport area.

Distribution of Bosnian-born residents:

State	Number #	Percentage of Bosnian-born community
Victoria	10,193	35.1%
New South Wales	7,639	29.2%
Queensland	3,626	13.9%
Western Australia	2,964	11.3%
South Australia	2,193	8.4%

Bosnian established mosques can be found in Deer Park (VIC), Noble Park (VIC), Penshurst (NSW), Smithfield (NSW), Wetherill Park (NSW), Eight Mile Plains (QLD), Southport (QLD) and Caversham (WA).

The main ethnic groups in Bosnia and Herzegovina, Bosniaks, Serbs and Croats are also represented in Australia among those born in Bosnia and Herzegovina.

Ancestry	Number #	Percentage of Bosnian-born community
Bosniak (Bosnian Muslim)	13,955	53.3%
Serbian	6,868	26.2%
Croatian	5,142	19.6%
Australian	500	1.9%

The percentage of residents born in Bosnia and Herzegovina that have Australian citizenship is considerably higher than most other ethnic groups at 95%. Most communities that escaped war and came to Australia as refugees have higher citizenship rates and this could be attributed to the Bosnian Australian community as well.

Bosnian Australian demography by religion (note that it includes only Bosnian-born in Bosnia and Herzegovina and not Australian with a Bosnian background)
Religious group	2021 (Note: Religious breakdown proportions based on "Bosnian" ethnic or cultural origin response on the 2021 census.)		2016 (Note: Religious breakdown proportions based on "Bosnian" ethnic or cultural origin response on the 2016 census.)		2011 (Note: Religious breakdown proportions based on "Bosnian" ethnic or cultural origin response on the 2011 census.)	
Religious group	Pop.	%	Pop.	%	Pop.	%
Islam	6,261 ▲	23.92% ▲	5,560 ▼	23.21% ▼	7,603	29.6%
Eastern Orthodox	5,560 ▲	21.24% ▲	4,645 ▼	19.39% ▼	7,063	27.5%
Catholic	6,294 ▲	24.05% ▲	5,162 ▼	21.55% ▼	5,585	21.75%
Other Christian denomination	1,519 ▼	5.8% ▼	1,599 ▲	6.67% ▲	87	0.34%
(Total Christian)	13,373▲	51.1% ▲	11,406▼	47.61%▼	12,735	49.59%
Irreligion	5,537 ▲	21.16% ▼	5,560 ▲	23.21% ▲	3,882	15.12%
Other	1000 ▼	3.82% ▼	1,854 ▲	7.74% ▲	1,462	5.69%
Total Bosnian Australian population	26,171 ▲	100%	23,957 ▼	100%	25,682	100%

== Media ==
The SBS broadcasts a Bosnian-language program on SBS Radio 2 from 2 PM every Tuesday and a repeat from 3 PM on Sunday. It also broadcasts BHT1 Dnevnik news program daily from 2:30 pm to 3 PM as part of its WorldWatch programming block.

Other community radio stations such as 3ZZZ (Melbourne), 4EB (Brisbane), 6EBA-FM (Perth), 2000FM (Sydney), VOX FM (Wollongong), 1CMS (Canberra), 5EBI (Adelaide) also broadcast in Bosnian.

== Language ==
There are five Bosnian Saturday schools operating in Sydney:

- Bosnian Ethnic School at Amity College in Auburn
- Bosnian Ethnic School, Australian Bosnian & Herzegovinian Cultural Association in Leppington
- Bosnian Ethnic School at Liverpool Public School in Liverpool
- Bosnian Ethnic School, Australian Bosnian Islamic Society Gazi Husrev-beg in Penshurst
- Bosnian Ethnic School, Australian Bosnian Islamic Society Gazi Husrev-beg in Smithfield

== Sport clubs ==
- Balmoral FC - Ðerzelez
- FC Old Bridge Salisbury
- FC Bossy Liverpool
- FC Gazy Auburn
- Heatherton United FC
- BiH United FC Adelaide
- Maribyrnong Greens FC - Bosna Melbourne

== Notable people ==
- Alen Harbas, soccer player
- Amir Alagic, soccer coach
- Jordan Grant, rugby league footballer
- Ajdin Hrustic, soccer player
- Azra Hadzic, tennis player
- Andreja Pejic, model
- Obren Kljajić, soccer player
- Bernard Tomic, tennis player
- Kate Tolo, businesswoman, marketer, and biohacker
- Ed Husic, politician, Member for Chifley
- Reshad Strik, actor
- Husein Alicajic, filmmaker
- Harley Balic, former AFL footballer
- Hana Basic, sprinter
- Katarina Carroll, Commissioner of the Queensland Police Service
- Dino Djulbic, soccer player
- Dijana Alic, academic
- Inga Peulich, politician
- Ned Catic, former professional rugby league footballer
- Omar Jasika, tennis player
- Mirza Muratovic, soccer player
- Monika Radulovic, model
- Esma Voloder, model
- Sasa Sestic, barista
- Selma Kajan, middle-distance runner

== See also ==
- Bosnian diaspora
- European Australians
- Europeans in Oceania
- Immigration to Australia
