= Albany River Rats =

Minor league professional ice hockey team in the American Hockey League

- City: Albany, New York
- League: American Hockey League
- Operated: 1993–2010
- Home arena: MVP Arena
- Colors: Red, black, white
- Affiliates: Carolina Hurricanes (2006–2010); Colorado Avalanche (2006–2007); New Jersey Devils (1993–2006)

Franchise history
- 1971–1974: Boston Braves
- 1990–1993: Capital District Islanders
- 1993–2010: Albany River Rats
- 2010–present: Charlotte Checkers

Championships
- Regular season titles: 2 (1994–95, 1995–96)
- Division titles: 3 (1994–95, 1995–96, 1997–98)
- Calder Cups: 1 (1994–95)

The Albany River Rats were a minor league professional ice hockey team in the American Hockey League. They played in Albany, New York, at the Times Union Center.

== History ==
=== Background ===
When the Knickerbocker Arena opened in Albany in 1990, the Fort Wayne Komets of the International Hockey League (IHL) relocated and began play in the new venue as the Albany Choppers. The team suffered at the box office and ended up folding in February 1991 because of competition with two nearby American Hockey League (AHL) franchises, including the Capital District Islanders, which also began play during the 1990–91 season at the Houston Field House in Troy. While an AHL team had not previously been established in the Capital District because it was located within the 50-mile (80 km) territorial limit of the Adirondack Red Wings, a deal was worked out when the IHL came to Albany. After the 1992–93 season, the Capital District Islanders changed their affiliation to the New Jersey Devils, relocated to the Knickerbocker Arena, and were renamed the Albany River Rats.

=== Transition from the Islanders to the River Rats ===
During the 1994–95 season, the River Rats posted a 46-17-17 record, won the league's regular season title, and also took home the Calder Cup as playoff champions.

On March 22, 2006, the Devils announced that they were cutting ties with the River Rats after the 2005–06 AHL season, as the parent club announced the purchase of the Lowell Lock Monsters. Despite the move, the River Rats were not relocated. In April 2006, The Carolina Hurricanes signed a one-year agreement (with the option to renew for two additional) with the River Rats to be their farm affiliate; the result was essentially a swap of AHL affiliates as the Lowell franchise had previously been the top affiliate of Carolina. Later on, Carolina was joined by the Colorado Avalanche in a one-year partnership agreement. On February 22, 2007, the Carolina Hurricanes and Albany River Rats announced that their affiliation agreement had been extended through the 2008–09 season.

On April 24, 2008, the River Rats lost 3–2 to the Philadelphia Phantoms in the (until then) longest game played in AHL history. The Phantoms' Ryan Potulny scored 2:58 into the fifth overtime. Albany gave up 101 shots on goal, and goaltender Michael Leighton made 98 saves.

=== 2009 bus crash ===
On February 19, 2009, five people were seriously injured when a bus carrying the team home from a game in Lowell struck a guardrail and rolled on its side on Interstate 90 in Becket, Massachusetts. Nicolas Blanchard, Joe Jensen, Jonathan Paiement, Casey Borer, and the River Rats radio color commentator John Hennessy were taken to Berkshire Medical Center in Pittsfield with serious injuries.

=== Move to Charlotte ===
In late January 2010, word began to leak out of Raleigh that the franchise was about to be sold and moved to Charlotte, North Carolina. On February 10, it became official as the Albany River Rats website announced that the sale of the franchise had been completed, and that the team would be moving to Charlotte at the conclusion of the 2009–10 AHL Season. "Capital District Sports, Inc. announced today that its subsidiary, the Albany River Rats, has sold its American Hockey League franchise to MAK Hockey, LLC located in Charlotte, North Carolina. The sale will not affect the remainder of the 2009-10 season, with regular season games concluding on April 10, 2010, followed by the 2010 Calder Cup Playoffs."

=== Hockey in Albany after the River Rats ===
Although relocation of the Portland franchise would not come to fruition, Albany did not go long without an AHL franchise. On June 6, it was announced that the Lowell Devils would be relocating to Albany, reestablishing the city's connection with the New Jersey Devils. Despite the tradition of the River Rats branding, officials announced that as a separate entity from the previous franchise, the new team would be known as the Albany Devils. The relationship only lasted through the 2016–17 season, after which the Devils announced they would be relocating their AHL team to Binghamton, New York to replace the Ottawa Senators' team after they relocated.

=== Affiliates ===
- New Jersey Devils (1993–2006)
- Colorado Avalanche (2006–2007)
- Carolina Hurricanes (2006–2010)

This market was previously served by: Albany Choppers of the IHL (1990–91)
The franchise was replaced by: Albany Devils of the AHL, a relocation of the Lowell Devils (2010–2017)
The franchise was later known as: Charlotte Checkers

=== American Hockey League Hall of Famers ===
AHL Hall of Fame Honored Members
| Name | Seasons | Induction Year |
|---|---|---|
| Keith Aucoin | 2006-08 (player) | 2022 |
| Robbie Ftorek | 1993-96, 2003-06 (head coach) | 2020 |
| Bryan Helmer | 1993-98 (player) | 2017 |
| Michael Leighton | 2007-08 (player) | 2025 |

== Season-by-season results ==
=== Regular season ===
| Season | Games | Won | Lost | Tied | OTL | SOL | Points | Goals for | Goals against | Standing |
|---|---|---|---|---|---|---|---|---|---|---|
| 1993–94 | 80 | 38 | 34 | 8 | — | — | 84 | 312 | 315 | 3rd, North |
| 1994–95 | 80 | 46 | 17 | 17 | — | — | 109 | 293 | 219 | 1st, North |
| 1995–96 | 80 | 54 | 19 | 7 | — | — | 115 | 322 | 218 | 1st, Central |
| 1996–97 | 80 | 38 | 28 | 9 | 5 | — | 90 | 269 | 231 | 3rd, Empire State |
| 1997–98 | 80 | 43 | 20 | 11 | 6 | — | 103 | 290 | 223 | 1st, Empire State |
| 1998–99 | 80 | 46 | 26 | 6 | 2 | — | 100 | 275 | 230 | 2nd, Empire State |
| 1999–00 | 80 | 30 | 40 | 7 | 3 | — | 70 | 225 | 250 | 4th, Empire State |
| 2000–01 | 80 | 30 | 40 | 6 | 4 | — | 70 | 216 | 262 | 6th, Mid-Atlantic |
| 2001–02 | 80 | 14 | 42 | 12 | 12 | — | 52 | 172 | 271 | 4th, East |
| 2002–03 | 80 | 25 | 37 | 11 | 7 | — | 68 | 197 | 235 | 5th, East |
| 2003–04 | 80 | 21 | 39 | 11 | 9 | — | 62 | 182 | 257 | 7th, East |
| 2004–05 | 80 | 29 | 38 | — | 6 | 7 | 71 | 198 | 248 | 7th, East |
| 2005–06 | 80 | 25 | 48 | — | 4 | 3 | 57 | 206 | 278 | 7th, Atlantic |
| 2006–07 | 80 | 37 | 36 | — | 4 | 3 | 81 | 246 | 258 | 4th, East |
| 2007–08 | 80 | 43 | 30 | — | 3 | 4 | 93 | 213 | 198 | 3rd, East |
| 2008–09 | 80 | 33 | 40 | — | 3 | 4 | 73 | 219 | 258 | 7th, East |
| 2009–10 | 80 | 43 | 29 | — | 3 | 5 | 94 | 244 | 231 | 2nd, East |

=== Playoffs ===
| Season | 1st round | 2nd round | 3rd round | Finals |
|---|---|---|---|---|
| 1993–94 | L, 1–4, POR | — | — | — |
| 1994–95 | W, 4–0, ADK | W, 4–2, PRO | -- | W, 4–0, FRE |
| 1995–96 | L, 1–3, COR | — | — | — |
| 1996–97 | W, 3–1, ADK | W, 4–3, ROC | L, 1–4, HAM | — |
| 1997–98 | W, 3–0, ADK | W, 4–0, HAM | L, 2–4, PHI | — |
| 1998–99 | L, 3–2, HAM | — | — | — |
| 1999–00 | L, 3–2, ROC | — | — | — |
| 2000–01 | Out of playoffs | | | |
| 2001–02 | Out of playoffs | | | |
| 2002–03 | Out of playoffs | | | |
| 2003–04 | Out of playoffs | | | |
| 2004–05 | Out of playoffs | | | |
| 2005–06 | Out of playoffs | | | |
| 2006–07 | L, 1–4, HER | — | — | — |
| 2007–08 | L, 3-4 PHI | — | — | — |
| 2008–09 | Out of playoffs | | | |
| 2009–10 | W, 4-0 WBS | L, 0-4 HER | — | — |

== Team records ==
=== Single season ===
Goals: 46 (Canada) Jeff Williams (1998–99)
Assists: 63 (United States) Keith Aucoin (2006–07)
Points: 99 (United States) Keith Aucoin (2006–07)
Penalty Minutes: 348 (Canada) Matt Ruchty (1994–95)
GAA: 2.10 (Canada) Michael Leighton (2007–08)
SV%: .931 (Canada) Michael Leighton (2007–08)

=== Career ===
Career goals: 155 (Canada) Steve Brûlé
Career assists: 214 (Canada) Steve Brûlé
Career points: 369 (Canada) Steve Brûlé
Career penalty minutes: 1197 (Canada) Rob Skrlac
Career goaltending wins: 77 (Poland) Peter Sidorkiewicz
Career shutouts: 8 (Poland) Peter Sidorkiewicz
Career games: 423 (Slovakia) Jiri Bicek

=== Former affiliates (8 stations) ===
- WGNA/1460: Albany
- WPTR/1540: Albany
- WROW/590: Albany
- WABY/1160: Mechanicville
- WTMM-FM/104.5: Mechanicville
- WTMM/1300: Rensselaer
- WVKZ/1240: Schenectady
- WOFX/980: Troy
