= CINI =

CINI may refer to:

- CINI-FM, a radio station broadcasting on 95.3 MHz from Mistissini, Quebec, Canada.
- Child In Need Institute
