= WQAR =

WQAR may refer to:

- WQAR-LP, a low-power radio station (95.7 FM) licensed to serve Addison, Michigan, United States
- WJKE, a radio station (101.3 FM) licensed to serve Stillwater, New York, United States
