= WWOK =

WWOK may refer to:

- WWOK-LP, a radio station licensed to serve Greenville, South Carolina, United States
- WFNT, a radio station licensed to serve Flint, Michigan, United States, which held the call sign WWOK from 1947 to 1953
- WGFY, a radio station licensed to serve Charlotte, North Carolina, United States, which held the call sign WWOK from 1955 to 1969
- WSUA, a radio station licensed to serve Miami, Florida, United States, which held the call sign WWOK from 1969 to 1980
- WSML, a radio station licensed to serve Graham, North Carolina, United States, which held the call sign WWOK from 1981 to 1982
- WRSF, a radio station licensed to serve Columbia, North Carolina, United States, which held the call sign WWOK from 1982 to 1987
- WGBF (AM), a radio station licensed to serve Evansville, Indiana, United States, which held the call sign WWOK from 1989 to 1995
