= Korg (disambiguation) =

Korg or KORG may refer to:

- Korg, a Japanese electronic musical instruments maker
- Korg (character), a character in the Marvel Comics universe
- Orange County Airport (Texas), an airport with the ICAO code "KORG"
- Korg: 70,000 B.C., a 1974 TV series featuring Neanderthals
- KORG-LP, a low-power radio station (95.3 FM) licensed to serve Cleveland, Texas, United States
