= KTTF =

KTTF may refer to:

- Custer Airport (ICAO code KTTF)
- KTTF-LP, a low-power radio station (95.3 FM) licensed to serve Tomball, Texas, United States
