= Bayou Vista =

Bayou Vista can refer to a place in the United States:

- Bayou Vista, Louisiana
- Bayou Vista, Texas
