= Star 101.3 =

Star 101.3 may refer to:

- KIOI, a Hot Adult Contemporary radio station licensed to San Francisco, California
- WJKE, an Adult Contemporary radio station licensed to Stillwater, New York
