= WBGG =

WBGG may refer to:

- WBGG (AM), a radio station (970 AM) licensed to Pittsburgh, Pennsylvania, United States
- WBGG-FM, a radio station (105.9 FM) licensed to Fort Lauderdale, Florida, United States
- the ICAO code for Kuching International Airport
- WABY, a radio station (900 AM) licensed to Watervliet, New York, United States, which held the call sign WBGG from 1992 to 1994
