= KJMP =

- Pierce, Colorado; United States
- Broadcast area: Fort Collins-Greeley
- Frequency: 870 kHz
- Branding: Jump 104.5

Programming
- Format: Classic hip hop
- Affiliations: Compass Media Networks

Ownership
- Owner: Loud Media; (Mid-Century Radio LLC)

History
- First air date: 2004
- Call sign meaning: "Jump"

Technical information
- Licensing authority: FCC
- Facility ID: 129513
- Class: B
- Power: 1,200 watts day; 320 watts night
- Transmitter coordinates: 40°36′24.9″N 104°41′20.9″W
- Translator: 104.5 K283CN (Fort Collins)

Links
- Public license information: Public file; LMS
- Webcast: Listen live
- Website: www.jumpradio.com/ftcollins/

KJMP (870 AM, "Jump 104.5") is a radio station broadcasting a classic hip hop format. Licensed to Pierce, Colorado, United States, the station serves the Fort Collins-Greeley area. The station is owned by Loud Media, through Mid-Century Radio LLC.

== History ==
When KJMP first came on air in 2004, it was simulcasting KJAC 105.5 FM. The station was formerly owned by White Park Broadcasting, Inc. In August 2009 ownership was transferred to Brahmin Broadcasting Corporation.

On August 20, 2012, KJMP changed formats from sports to oldies, branded as "The Big 870". As a sports station, KJMP aired programming from ESPN Radio. On November 21, 2016, KJMP began testing an oldies format by simulcasting on 96.9 FM KYAP in Nunn, Colorado.

On November 21, 2019, KJMP changed its format from oldies to classic hip hop, branded as "Jump 104.5". The station was now operated via a local marketing agreement by Loud Media. In late 2024, Mid-Century Radio—a company owned by Loud Media principal Aaron Ishmael—bought the station from Brahmin Broadcasting Corporation (a subsidiary of Northeast Digital and Wireless) for $50,000.
