= WFBR =

WFBR may refer to:

- WFBR (AM), a radio station (1590 AM) licensed to Glen Burnie, Maryland, United States
- WFBR-LP, a low-power radio station (95.3 FM) licensed to Mt. Washington, Kentucky, United States
- WJZ (AM), a radio station (1300 AM) licensed to Baltimore, Maryland, United States, which held the call sign WFBR from 1924 to 1990
- Worcester Foundation for Biomedical Research, a biomedical research institute in Central Massachusetts, which developed the birth control pill in the 1950s
