= KSIK =

KSIK may refer to:

- Sikeston Memorial Municipal Airport (ICAO code KSIK)
- KSIK-LP, a low-power radio station (95.3 FM) licensed to serve Greeley, Colorado, United States
- KRFD (FM), a radio station (100.1 FM) licensed to serve Fleming, Colorado, which held the call sign KSIK from 2012 to 2014
