= KQKI-FM =

- Bayou Vista, Louisiana; United States
- Broadcast area: Morgan City, Louisiana
- Frequency: 95.3 MHz
- Branding: KQKI 95.3

Programming
- Format: Country

Ownership
- Owner: Teche Broadcasting Company

History
- First air date: 1976

Technical information
- Licensing authority: FCC
- Facility ID: 64675
- Class: C3
- ERP: 16,500 watts
- HAAT: 122 meters (400 ft)
- Transmitter coordinates: 29°39′28.00″N 91°17′41.00″W

Links
- Public license information: Public file; LMS
- Website: http://www.kqki.com

KQKI-FM (95.3 FM, "KQKI 95.3") is an American radio station broadcasting a country music format. Licensed to Bayou Vista, Louisiana, United States, the station serves St. Mary Parish and surrounding areas. The station is currently owned by Teche Broadcasting Company.

The station is notable in that it plays an occasional song from the swamp pop genre inserted into their normal country music playlist. The station is an affiliate of the New Orleans Saints radio network.

== History ==
KQKI-FM came onto the air in 1976 as a 3,000 watt station serving the St. Mary parish area in addition to their KQKI AM station already on the air. In 1995 they upgraded to their current 16,500 watt signal and closed permanently the AM station in 1996.
