= CHXL-FM =

Coordinates: 50°56′34″N 103°23′53″W

- Okanese Indian Reserve, Saskatchewan, Canada; Canada
- Frequency: 95.3 FM
- Branding: 95 three Creek FM

Programming
- Format: community radio

Ownership
- Owner: O.K Creek Radio Station Inc.

History
- First air date: April 17, 2002 (approval)

Technical information
- Class: B
- ERP: 50 kWs horizontal polarization only
- HAAT: 71.2 meters (234 ft)

Links
- Website: CHXL website

CHXL-FM is a community radio station that operates at 95.3 FM in Okanese Indian Reserve, Saskatchewan, Canada. CHXL is owned by O.K. Creek Radio Station Inc.

On April 17, 2002, the station was given approval by the Canadian Radio-television and Telecommunications Commission (CRTC) to operate a community radio station at Okanese Indian Reserve.

== Notes ==
The CHXL-FM call sign was formerly used by CJPT-FM in Brockville, Ontario from 1998 to 2001.
