= XHPEDJ-FM =

Radio station in Encarnación de Díaz, Jalisco

- Encarnación de Díaz, Jalisco; Mexico
- Frequency: 95.3 FM
- Branding: Gallo FM

Programming
- Format: Regional Mexican

Ownership
- Owner: Graciela González del Villar

History
- First air date: 2018
- Call sign meaning: Encarnación de Díaz Jalisco

Technical information
- Licensing authority: CRT
- Class: A
- ERP: 100 watts
- HAAT: 407 m (1,335 ft)
- Transmitter coordinates: 21°39′37.5″N 102°13′38.3″W

Links
- Website: gallo.fm

XHPEDJ-FM is a radio station on 95.3 FM in Encarnación de Díaz, Jalisco. It is known as Gallo FM and carries a Regional Mexican format. The station broadcasts from a tower atop Cerro de los Gallos, the mountain used to provide TV service to Encarnación de Díaz and Aguascalientes, but its signal is directional toward Encarnación de Díaz and away from Aguascalientes.

== History ==
XHPEDJ was awarded in the IFT-4 radio auction of 2017. The station offically signed on in the summer of 2018.
