= XHWM-FM =

Radio station in San Cristóbal de las Casas, Chiapas, Mexico

- San Cristóbal de las Casas, Chiapas; Mexico
- Frequency: 95.3 FM
- Branding: Suprema Radio

Programming
- Format: Regional Mexican

Ownership
- Owner: Francisco José Narvaez Rincón

History
- First air date: July 7, 1969

Technical information
- Class: C1
- ERP: 3 kW
- HAAT: 670.55 m
- Transmitter coordinates: 16°44′16.9″N 92°41′16.7″W

Links
- Website: www.supremaradio.com

XHWM-FM is a radio station on 95.3 FM in San Cristóbal de las Casas, Chiapas. It is owned by Francisco José Narvaez Rincón and is known as Suprema Radio, which offers a Regional Mexican format.

== History ==
XEWM-AM 640 hit the air on July 7, 1969, being owned by Plinio Medina Pérez and receiving its concession on October 27 of that year. The 250-watt station was the first in San Cristóbal de las Casas, increasing its power to one kilowatt by the 1980s. In 2000, XHCRI-FM signed on as a noncommercial sister to XEWM.

In 2011, XEWM migrated to FM on 95.3 MHz. In 2018, it was authorized to move its transmitter to Cerro Huitepec.
