= XHRCB-FM =

Community radio station in Iguala, Guerrero, Mexico

Iguala-Buenavista de Cuéllar-Taxco, Guerrero; Mexico
- Frequency: 95.3 FM
- Branding: XHRCB 95.3 FM

Programming
- Format: Community radio

Ownership
- Owner: RCBC Comunicación, A.C.

History
- First air date: May 17, 2018
- Former frequencies: 97.7 FM (as a pirate)
- Call sign meaning: From the name of the concessionaire

Technical information
- Class: A
- ERP: 506 watts
- HAAT: 12 meters
- Transmitter coordinates: 18°33′07.76″N 99°36′31.72″W

Links
- Website: XHRCB-FM on Facebook

XHRCB-FM is a community radio station on 95.3 FM broadcasting from studios in Iguala, Guerrero. The station is owned by the civil association RCBC Comunicación, A.C.

== History ==
RCBC Comunicación was founded as Radio Comunitaria de Buenavista de Cuéllar, which operated as a pirate on 97.7 MHz. After filing for the station on November 30, 2015, on March 8, 2017, the Federal Telecommunications Institute (IFT) awarded RCBC Comunicación the concession for XHRCB-FM 95.3.

XHRCB began transmissions on May 17, 2018, with an inauguration ceremony featuring Iguala mayor Herón Delgado Castañeda and state social development secretary Sergio Adrián Mota Pineda.
