= Penshurst Mosque =

Mosque in Sydney, New South Wales, Australia

- Location of the mosque in greater Sydney

Religion
- Affiliation: Islam
- Ecclesiastical or organizational status: Mosque
- Ownership: Australian Islamic Society of Bosnia and Herzegovina Inc.
- Status: Active

Location
- Location: Penshurst, Sydney, New South Wales
- Country: Australia
- Interactive map of Penshurst Mosque
- Coordinates: 33°57′48″S 151°05′03″E

Architecture
- Type: Mosque architecture

Specifications
- Capacity: 500
- Dome: 1
- Minaret: 1

Website
- penshurstmosque.com

The Penshurst Mosque is a mosque in the southern Sydney suburb of Penshurst, in the St George area. The mosque is supervised by the Australian Islamic Society of Bosnia and Herzegovina Inc.

== History ==
The earliest beginnings of Penshurst Mosque go back to the establishment of the Australian Bosnian Islamic Society which was formed in the late 1970s by Bosnian immigrants.

The Penshurst Mosque was acquired in 1986 by the Bosnian community at 445-447 Forest Road, Penshurst. For over 30 years the mosque has been serving the needs of the Muslim community with a long history of co-existence and tolerance.

In 2013, the community announced plans for alterations and additions to the existing mosque, including a new domed roof and a new 30 m (98 ft)-high minaret. In 2018, Georges River Council gave approval to a revised development application, with the minaret height reduced to 16 m (52 ft) with three domes, in reducing diameters of 6 m (20 ft), 4 m (13 ft), and 2.8 m (9 ft 2 in).

== See also ==
- Islam in Australia
- List of mosques in Australia
