= XHGN-FM =

Radio station in Piedras Negras, Veracruz, Mexico

- Piedras Negras, Veracruz; Mexico
- Frequency: 95.3 FM
- Branding: La Gigante

Programming
- Format: Regional Mexican

Ownership
- Owner: Radio Emisora Comercial XEGN, S.A.

History
- First air date: March 5, 1973 (concession)

Technical information
- ERP: 6 kW
- Transmitter coordinates: 18°45′16″N 96°07′46″W

Links
- Webcast: Listen live

XHGN-FM is a radio station on 95.3 FM in Piedras Negras, Veracruz, Mexico, known as La Gigante.

== History ==
XEGN-AM 1500 received its concession on March 5, 1973. It was a 250-watt daytimer owned by Amando Alarcón Ruiz. In the 1990s, it moved to 1180 kHz with 10,000 watts day and 1,000 night.

XEGN moved to FM in 2010 as XHGN-FM 95.3.
