= XHCRI-FM =

Former radio station in San Cristóbal de las Casas, Chiapas, Mexico

Defunct

San Cristóbal de las Casas, Chiapas, Mexico; Mexico
- Frequency: 91.5 MHz

Ownership
- Owner: Francisco José Narvaez Rincón
- Sister stations: XHWM-FM

History
- First air date: December 24, 2000
- Last air date: April 25, 2016
- Call sign meaning: San CRIstóbal

Technical information
- Class: A
- ERP: 3 kW

XHCRI-FM was a noncommercial radio station on 91.5 FM in San Cristóbal de las Casas, Chiapas, Mexico. It was owned by Francisco José Narvaez Rincón and is known as Cristal FM.

== History ==
Logo as Cristal 91.5, used from 2000 to 2016

XHCRI received its permit on July 27, 2000 and signed on in time for Christmas, making it the first FM station in the city. Its owner already owned XEWM-AM, and for the first five years of its life it simulcast XEWM's programming. In 2005, XHCRI began carrying its own programs, separate from XEWM.

XHCRI carried talk programs during the day and musical programming at night. Its permit expired in 2010 and an attempted renewal was made two months late. As a result, XHCRI-FM ceased transmissions effective April 25, 2016.
