= XHMAC-FM =

Radio station in Manzanillo, Colima

- Manzanillo, Colima; Mexico
- Frequency: 95.3 FM
- Branding: La Poderosa

Programming
- Format: Regional Mexican

Ownership
- Owner: Grupo Radiorama; (XEMAC-AM, S.A. de C.V.)
- Operator: Grupo AS Comunicación

History
- First air date: February 24, 1993 (concession)
- Call sign meaning: MAnzanillo Colima

Technical information
- Class: B1
- ERP: 3 kW
- HAAT: 716 m
- Transmitter coordinates: 19°09′16″N 104°24′02″W

XHMAC-FM is a radio station on 95.3 FM in Manzanillo, Colima, transmitting from Cerro del Toro. The station is owned by Grupo Radiorama and operated by Grupo AS Comunicación, and carries a Regional Mexican format known as La Poderosa.

== History ==
XHMAC received its concession as XEMAC-AM 1330 on February 24, 1993. It was originally owned by Radio Teponaztli, S.A. and broadcast as a daytimer with 500 watts of power.

XEMAC was authorized to migrate to FM in 2011.
