= XHJR-FM =

Radio station in San Jeronimito-Zihuatanejo, Guerrero, Mexico

Currently silent

San Jeronimito, Guerrero; Mexico
- Broadcast area: Zihuatanejo
- Frequency: 95.3 FM

Programming
- Format: Silent

Ownership
- Owner: Capital Media; (Radiodifusoras Capital, S.A. de C.V.)

History
- First air date: January 30, 1964 (concession)
- Former frequencies: 1310 kHz, 630 kHz
- Call sign meaning: San Jeronimito

Technical information
- ERP: 5 kW
- Transmitter coordinates: 17°39′18.13″N 101°34′27.63″W

XHJR-FM is a radio station on 95.3 FM in San Jeronimito, Guerrero, Mexico, with transmitter in Zihuatanejo. It is owned by Capital Media.

== History ==
XEHJ-AM 1310 received its concession on January 30, 1964. It was located in Petatlán, Guerrero and owned by Jesús Orta Ramos, broadcasting with 250 watts.

The 1990s saw the first move of the station. After its 1999 transfer of control to Esperanza Zepeda Nava and María Fátima Orta Zepeda, and then its 2002 sale to Armando Puente Córdova, XEHJ became XEJR-AM 630, based in San Jeronimito with a power of 5 kW day and 2.5 kW night.

In November 2010, XEJR was cleared to move to FM as XHJR-FM 95.3. The original authorized facility broadcast with 25 kW from San Jeronimito. In 2015, XHJR was cleared to move to Zihuatanejo with 5 kW ERP, a move of 25.42 kilometres (15.80 mi). By this time, the station was already based in Zihuatanejo and operated by Capital Media. Capital would take possession of the concession itself in December 2018.

Like most Capital stations, XHJR adopted the new Lokura FM adult hits format in 2020.
