= Ernie Anastos =

American news anchor (1943–2026)

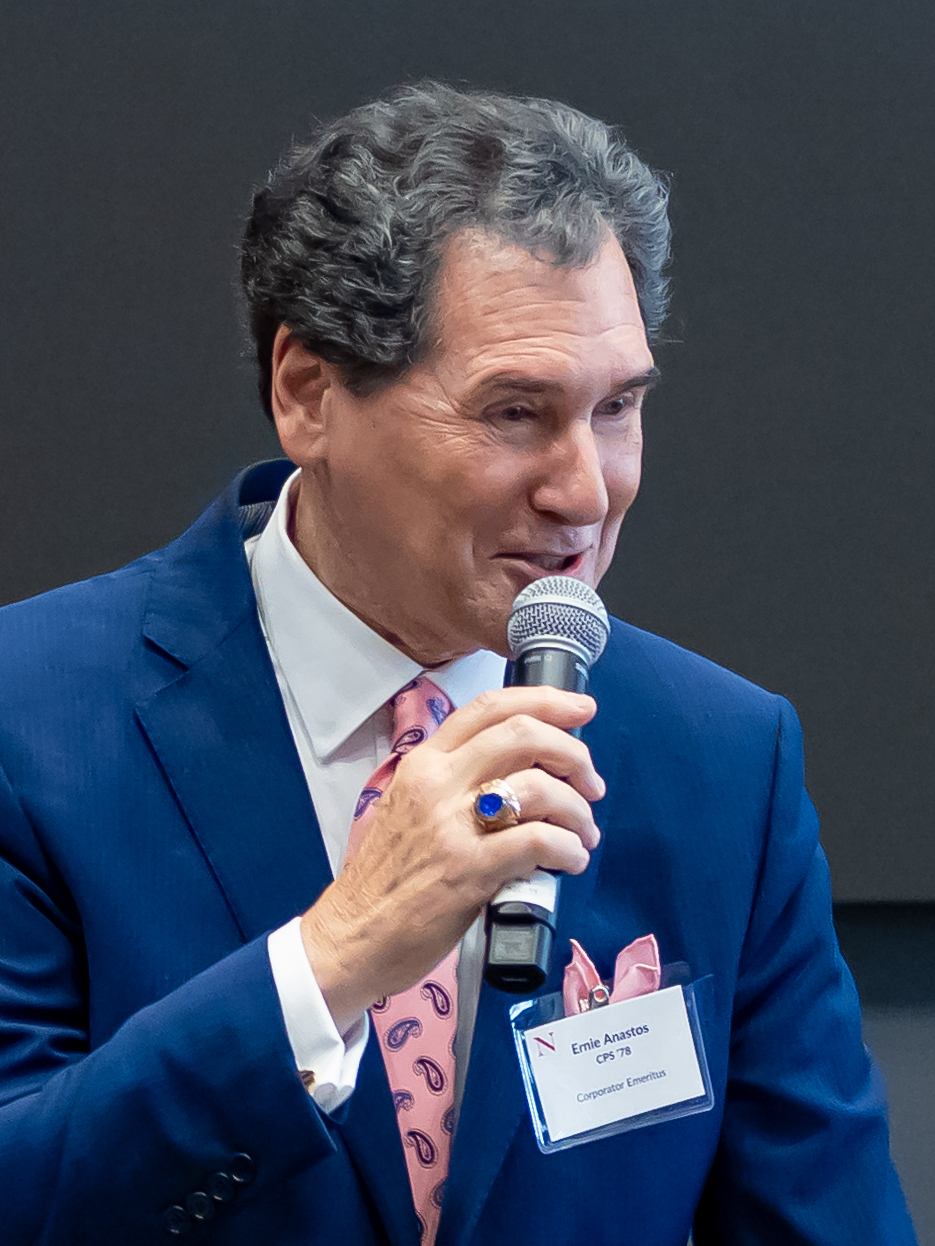
- Anastos in 2024
- Born: July 12, 1943; Nashua, New Hampshire, U.S.
- Died: March 12, 2026 (aged 82); Mount Kisco, New York, U.S.
- Education: Northeastern University (B.A.); Harvard Business School Management Studies
- Occupations: Television news anchor; talk show host
- Years active: 1976–2026 (television)
- Spouse: Kelly Anastos
- Children: 2

Ernie Anastos (July 12, 1943 – March 12, 2026) was an American Emmy award-winning television news anchor and talk show host on WABC (770 AM) with Positively Ernie focusing on uplifting stories and interviews. He was also a children’s author and host of his own nationally syndicated TV show, Positively America. He most visibly anchored the evening news at four flagship network stations in New York: UPN 9 (now My9), ABC 7, CBS 2, and FOX 5. In 2017, New York City Mayor Bill de Blasio honored Anastos by designating every March 21 to be Ernie Anastos Day.

Anastos covered stories including the September 11 attacks and the COVID-19 pandemic. He reported on Cuba under Fidel Castro in 2004 and interviewed US presidents Jimmy Carter, George H. W. Bush, and Bill Clinton, Soviet president Mikhail Gorbachev and South African bishop Desmond Tutu. He had broadcast ownership of AM and FM radio stations in New York State and New England. He was also the CEO of his own television production company creating entertainment programming. He launched an Internet youth channel and also published newspapers and magazines. He performed on-camera roles as himself in Hollywood motion pictures such as Independence Day, Summer of Sam, Run All Night, and The Yards.

He was a Hall of Fame Broadcaster and received more than 30 Emmy awards and nominations, including "Best Newscast in New York" and the Edward R. Murrow Award for broadcast excellence. The New York Times described him as "the ubiquitous anchorman". Anastos also was an author of career and educational books for young readers, and was furthermore distinguished for being the United States' first Greek-American news anchorman.

== Career ==
Anastos was a television news anchor at WABC-TV, WCBS-TV and WNYW-TV in New York throughout his career.

After graduating from Northeastern University with BA degree in Sociology, Anastos worked as a newsman at WRKO and WROR in Boston. In 1976, Anastos moved to television, becoming an anchor at WPRI-TV in Providence, Rhode Island. In June 1978, WABC-TV in New York hired Anastos and he became anchor of the 11 p.m. Eyewitness News broadcast in November. He anchored the 11 p.m. broadcast until 1982. Anastos also added the anchor duties for the 5 p.m. newscast on WABC-TV.

In 1982, he was replaced on the 5:00 and 11:00 pm newscasts by Tom Snyder, who joined WABC following the cancellation of his NBC late-night program. Anastos returned to anchoring in the late afternoon the following year, with Bill Beutel joining him to anchor a 4:30 pm newscast that failed to find an audience and was cancelled in early 1984; Snyder left WABC shortly thereafter to return to Los Angeles, and Anastos replaced him in his former anchor positions. Anastos again became the anchor of the early evening and late newscasts on WABC-TV, and would hold these positions for another five years.

In May 1989, Anastos announced that he was leaving WABC after eleven years. The next month, he took over as WCBS-TV’s lead anchor and also the 11 p.m. anchor role.

From 1995 to 2000, Anastos became involved in radio and TV broadcast ownership while also anchoring and hosting various assignments including, WWOR-TV and Lifetime's Our Home program.

In 2001, he returned to WCBS-TV as the lead anchor at 5, 6, and 11 p.m.. He covered The World Trade Center attacks on September 11, 2001 and the following days and weeks.

In 2005, he signed a five-year, $10 million contract with WNYW-TV. At channel 5, he appeared for the news at 5 and 10 pm. At that time, Anastos took over the 6 p.m. news anchor role on WNYW-TV in 2012 with a newly revamped format to include more live interview segments and positive news stories.

In June 2019, Anastos decided to relinquish his anchoring duties at the WNYW-TV to enroll at the Harvard Business School to study a curriculum of leadership and management courses. An on-air tribute video was prepared by Fox 5. Anastos was also president of Ernie Anastos World Television, Inc. which has co-produced "New York Star of the Day", "Ernie Anastos in New York" and "Positively Ernie", which all appeared on WNYW-TV in New York.

== Radio ownership ==
Anastos was the proprietor of the Saratoga Springs, New York-based radio station WJKE. The partnership, known as the Anastos Media Group, soon bought several other stations in the Capital District of New York State and later entered the eastern New England media market. The daily operations of the group were handled in part by Anastos' daughter Nina. Effective September 7, 2012, the stations—WABY, WQAR, WUAM and its translator W291BY, and WVKZ—were sold to Empire Broadcasting Corporation for $1.2 million.

== On-air mishap ==
On September 15, 2009, Anastos was working for WNYW Fox News, anchoring the evening news broadcast. Leading out of the weather report by meteorologist Nick Gregory, it appears Anastos was hoping to remark to the weatherman in a lead-out: "It takes a tough man to make a tender forecast; keep plucking that chicken." This is a riff on a commercial for Perdue Farms that had been airing in 2009. Instead, during the prime-time broadcast, Anastos inadvertently said: "It takes a tough man to make a tender forecast; keep fucking that chicken."

Co-anchor Dari Alexander froze and WNYW went immediately to commercial. Anastos issued an apology and was neither fired nor fined. The incident would, however, become a recurring joke that played during Late Show with David Letterman.

== Personal life and death ==
Anastos's grandfather and namesake was the Greek Orthodox priest Fr. Anastasios Anastasiou.

Anastos died of pneumonia at Northern Westchester Hospital on March 12, 2026, at the age of 82.

== Awards ==
Anastos received 30 Emmy Awards and nominations, including the Emmy Lifetime Award and Edward R. Murrow Award for excellence in writing.

He was profiled in the International Who’s Who of Intellectuals. A Phi Kappa Phi honoree, he graduated with a Bachelor of Arts degree from Northeastern University in Boston, where he was a member of the university board. He completed additional studies at Harvard Business School and held honorary doctorate degrees from Marist College, Sacred Heart University and New York Institute of Technology. In May 2008, he was awarded an honorary doctorate degree from Manhattanville College.

On March 21, 2017, he was honoured by New York City Mayor Bill de Blasio, to have March 21 named Ernie Anastos Day in New York City. His other awards include; the Ellis Island Medal of Honor, New Yorker of the Year Manhattan Chamber of Commerce, and a National Father of the Year Award.

== See also ==
- New Yorkers in journalism
