= J. R. Gach =

American radio host (1952–2015)

Jay Robert "J.R." Gach (April 2, 1952 – July 13, 2015) was a talk radio host and shock jock who had prominent on-air roles in Buffalo, New York; Louisiana; and Schenectady, New York.

Gach was born in 1952 to Joseph Harry Gach (1917–2007), a retired army colonel, and Dorothy Louise Shive (1921–2004). He got his start in radio at a couple of stations in Chester, Pennsylvania as "Jay Roberts" in the late 1960s.

Jay worked for KLOU in Lake Charles, Louisiana, from 1975 to 1976. In 1989 through 1992, Gach worked for "Kajun 103" in Baton Rouge, Louisiana, as a morning show host. In a dramatic foreshadowing of his radio career to follow, Gach spectacularly flamed out in Baton Rouge. In this early era of talk radio, Gach also attempted a midday show on 1300 WIBR in Port Allen, Louisiana. Apparently due to his excessive weight, Gach was often at a loss trying to talk for extended periods on WIBR without use of his cart-based sound effects. Gach would later state his poor performance in Louisiana was an act of deliberate self-sabotage brought on by depressive episodes.

From the summer of 1992 through 1995, Gach worked as a talk radio host on WGR ("J.R. on 'GR") and later WWKB in Buffalo, New York, where a doctor secretly treated Gach's depression with the antidepressant Prozac. Gach famously quipped on the air that he liked the Buffalo area and wanted to stay there so much that, if necessary, he would "drive a bus" in order to earn enough money to stay in the area. However, this promise would be broken as WWKB prepared for one of its many format changes, and Gach then returned to Louisiana (this time, New Orleans–based WWL). After WWL, he hosted a show from 1998 to 2002 on WGY in Schenectady, New York, the region that he would call home for the next several years. During this time, he briefly held (for a few weeks in February 2001) the late-night host's position at one of America's top news/talk stations, WLW in Cincinnati, Ohio, from which he was fired for referring to Japanese people as "yellow monkeys." As his behavior became increasingly erratic starting in 2001, Gach mysteriously disappeared from the air in August 2002; two months later, his then-wife (Suzie Gach, a radio veteran with whom J.R. would often co-host his shows) announced that he had been diagnosed with bipolar disorder and had attempted suicide.

After undergoing another round of antidepressants, Gach would later resurface on WRCZ/WBOE "The Bone" (now WYKV) in Albany as that station's afternoon and later morning host; paired with Shawn "Pi" Bolts, he continued to make many controversial racial comments and jokes including the harassment of one individual, referring to a restaurant in which she was working as a "genetic mutant restaurant" during a February 15, 2006, broadcast. Said individual sued Galaxy Communications, then owners of WRCZ/WBOE, and the lawsuit was settled for $1,000,000 in December 2007. Gach had been released from WBOE in August 2006.

Gach is also credited as being the first person to voice a radio commercial with a profanity, describing Sinus Buster cayenne nasal spray as "The best shit that ever was" for a commercial on Sirius Satellite Radio. The radio spot was conceived by Wayne Perry, inventor of Sinus Buster and infamous entrepreneur known for his guerrilla marketing tactics.

For most of 2007, Gach hosted his own talk show on the Internet radio, paid for by sponsors. It included local advertisements, announcements by nationally recognized voiceover personality Jim Cutler (also known as the voice of ESPN Radio and many other stations), and weather forecasts for the Albany/Schenectady area, even though the show was based (by Gach's own admission) from a home studio in Florida. Like his previous shows, Gach prominently featured his significant other, although his wife Suzie had long since divorced him, and he now aired with his girlfriend Erica. The show was completely uncensored and frequently used language and euphemisms that would not be allowed on traditional radio. The show aired live on weekdays from 2 p.m. to 4 p.m. Eastern Time and looped the most recent show when off the air.

In December 2007, Gach's father and aunt both died. This, coupled with the lawsuit settlement and the late 2000s recession, prompted Gach to pull his show and website offline, at first listing a tribute to his parents and his late aunt, and later only a black screen, with the words "Stay Tuned..." in the center of the screen in yellow lettering. By the end of 2007, the "jrshowonline.com" and "jrgach.com" domains had been taken offline or allowed to expire.

Gach was an avowed libertarian, who supported the campaign of Harry Browne in 1996 and supported Ron Paul for President.

Gach died on July 13, 2015, at the age of 63 in his home in New Port Richey, Florida, after a lifelong battle with diabetes. JR had become a bit of a recluse after leaving the talk-show circuit. He had died without issue and his remains were cremated.
