= WPTR (AM) =

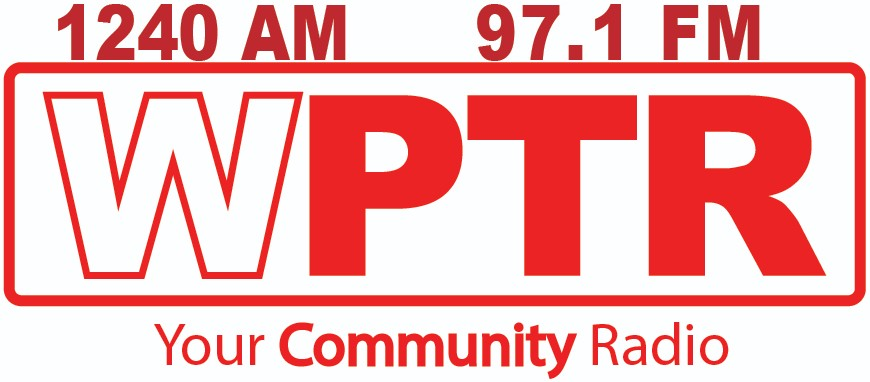
- Schenectady, New York; United States
- Broadcast area: Capital District
- Frequency: 1240 kHz
- Branding: WPTR 1240 AM 97.1 FM

Programming
- Format: Full service classic rock and classic hits

Ownership
- Owner: Area Independent Radio, Inc.

History
- First air date: 1942 (as WSNY)
- Former call signs: WSNY (1942–1975); WWWD (1976–1988); WVKZ (1988–2012)
- Call sign meaning: PaTRoon Broadcasting Company (original owners of WDCD)

Technical information
- Licensing authority: FCC
- Facility ID: 8726
- Class: C
- Power: 1,000 watts unlimited
- Transmitter coordinates: 42°48′37″N 73°59′4″W
- Translator: 97.1 W246DS (Ballston Spa)

Links
- Public license information: Public file; LMS
- Webcast: Listen live
- Website: www.wptrradio.com

WPTR (1240 kHz) is a commercial AM radio station licensed to Schenectady, New York. The station serves the Capital District of New York. The station is currently owned by the Area Independent Radio, Inc. It airs a classic rock-classic hits radio format.

The studios and offices are located at the Via Port Mall in Rotterdam, New York. The transmitter is also in Rotterdam, off West Campbell Road, near the mall. WPTR broadcasts at 1,000 watts, day and night, using a non-directional antenna.

WPTR also has an FM translator, 97.1 MHz W246DS in Ballston Spa, New York.

The station is an affiliate of the weekly syndicated Pink Floyd show "Floydian Slip."

== History ==
WPTR began as long running middle-of-the-road station WSNY in 1942. In 1968, WSNY flipped to Top 40, going into direct competition with more powerful and established stations WPTR (now WDCD) and WTRY (now WOFX). The format was initially a success. However, by the early 1970s, FM Top 40 began to take hold in the Albany market as well; by 1973, in addition to WPTR and WTRY, WSNY had to contend with WABY (now WAMC), WGFM (now WRVE), and WHSH (now WPYX). In 1974, WSNY left the air. In 1976, the station returned to the air as WWWD, with kind of a top 40/oldies hybrid format. WWWD began to add vast amounts of off-track betting racing to their schedule during the 1980s. In early 1988, the station became WVKZ and partially simulcasted WVKZ-FM (now WMHH), with their rock based top 40 format. WVKZ drifted through various formats during the 1990s, including classic country and talk, before flipping to oldies in 2004. In February 2009, WVKZ started broadcasting Scott Shannon's True Oldies network after broadcasting as "Real Oldies" since 2004.

Ernie Anastos sold his Albany-area stations—WVKZ, WABY, WQAR, and WUAM and its translator W291BY—to Empire Broadcasting Corporation in June 2012 at a purchase price of $1.2 million. The transaction consummated on September 7, 2012. On September 8, 2012 the station adopted the historic WPTR call letters, formerly used on the stations now known as WDCD, WAJZ, and WMHH. On June 7, 2013 WPTR changed their format to sports. On June 27, 2016 WPTR changed their format from sports to a simulcast of business news-formatted WAIX 1160 AM Mechanicville, branded as "Empire News Network". On May 15, 2018, WPTR and its sister AM stations went silent (off the air).

On December 31, 2019 WPTR was sold to Area Independent Radio, Inc., a group led by two retired professors from Union College. WPTR currently operates a full time studio located at the Via Port Mall in Rotterdam, New York. WPTR officially went back on the air as a classic rock station, featuring music from 60s thru the 90s, as well as featuring the AOR (album-oriented rock) format made popular in the 1970s. The station's format is styled after the era of WPTR's popular DJ 'Boom Boom Branigan' and features some nostalgia, including vintage jingles of the 50s and 60s. Full-service trappings include an apolitical news department, Albany Patroons basketball, and ethnic programming on weekends.

== History of call letters ==
The call letters WPTR were previously assigned to an AM station (later known as WDCD) in Albany, New York.

== Translators ==
Call sign	Frequency	City of license	FID	ERP (W)	Class	FCC info
W246DS	97.1 FM	Ballston Spa, New York	201716	250	D	LMS
