= XHLPZ-FM =

Radio station in Lampazos-Anáhuac, Nuevo León, Mexico

- Lampazos, Nuevo León; Mexico
- Broadcast area: Lampazos and Ciudad Anáhuac, Nuevo León
- Frequency: 95.3 FM
- Branding: La Traviesa

Programming
- Format: Regional Mexican

Ownership
- Owner: Grupo M; (Organización Radiofónica del Norte, S.A. de C.V.)

History
- First air date: April 3, 1995 (concession)
- Call sign meaning: LamPaZos

Technical information
- Licensing authority: CRT
- Class: AA
- ERP: 4 kW
- HAAT: 49.3 m (162 ft)
- Transmitter coordinates: 27°01′24.2″N 100°30′25.2″W

Links
- Website: XHLPZ Website

XHLPZ-FM is a radio station on 95.3 FM in Lampazos, Nuevo León, with studios in Ciudad Anáhuac. The station is owned by Organización Radiofónica del Norte and carries a Regional Mexican format known as La Traviesa.

== History ==
XHLPZ received its concession on April 3, 1995. It was owned by Miguel Ernesto Hinojosa Margain and was later transferred to Organización Radiofónica del Norte in 2003.
