= DWKS =

Radio station in Camarines Norte, Philippines

Love Radio Daet (DWKS)
- Daet; Philippines
- Broadcast area: Camarines Norte
- Frequency: 95.3 MHz
- Branding: 95.3 Love Radio

Programming
- Languages: Bicolano, Filipino
- Format: Contemporary MOR, OPM
- Network: Love Radio

Ownership
- Owner: MBC Media Group

History
- First air date: April 12, 1997
- Former names: Kiss FM (1997–1999)
- Call sign meaning: Kiss (former branding)

Technical information
- Licensing authority: NTC
- Power: 1 kW
- ERP: 2.1 Kw

Links
- Webcast: Listen Live
- Website: www.loveradio.com.ph/daet

95.3 Love Radio (DWKS 95.3 MHz) is an FM station in the Philippines owned and operated by MBC Media Group. Its studios and transmitter are located at 3rd Floor, Lacson Bldg., Governor Panotes Ave., Daet.
