= WHGE-LP =

- Wilmington, Delaware; United States
- Frequency: 95.3 MHz
- Branding: The Education and Advocacy Station

Programming
- Format: Community radio

Ownership
- Owner: Afro-American Historical Society of Delaware

History
- First air date: January 18, 2018

Technical information
- Licensing authority: FCC
- Facility ID: 196732
- Class: LP1
- ERP: 50 watts
- HAAT: 9 metres (30 ft)
- Transmitter coordinates: 39°44′31.6″N 75°32′30.9″W

Links
- Public license information: LMS
- Website: www.whge953.com

WHGE-LP (95.3 FM) is a radio station licensed to serve the community of Wilmington, Delaware. The station is owned by the Afro-American Historical Society of Delaware. It airs a community radio format, focusing on Black cultural education.

The station was assigned the WHGE-LP call letters by the Federal Communications Commission on July 20, 2015.
