= KCDQ =

- Douglas, Arizona; United States
- Frequency: 95.3 MHz

Programming
- Format: Adult contemporary

Ownership
- Owner: Cochise Broadcasting, LLC (a Wyoming LLC)

History
- First air date: 1996 (as KEAL)
- Former call signs: KEAL (1996–2002)

Technical information
- Licensing authority: FCC
- Facility ID: 68769
- Class: A
- ERP: 800 watts
- HAAT: 12 meters
- Transmitter coordinates: 31°22′8″N 109°31′45″W

Links
- Public license information: Public file; LMS

KCDQ (95.3 FM) is a radio station broadcasting an adult contemporary format. It is licensed to Douglas, Arizona, United States. The station is currently owned by Cochise Broadcasting, LLC (a Wyoming LLC).

== History ==
The station, originally KKRK, went on the air as KEAL on 1996-01-29. on 2002-06-05, the station changed its call sign to the current KCDQ.
