= WXCV =

- Homosassa Springs, Florida; United States
- Broadcast area: Crystal River, Florida
- Frequency: 95.3 MHz
- Branding: Citrus 95.3

Programming
- Format: CHR
- Affiliations: Westwood One; Compass Media Networks

Ownership
- Owner: Betty Lou Marcocci, Stephen Schurdell, and Rusty Marcocci; (WGUL-FM, Inc.)

History
- First air date: March 1983
- Call sign meaning: XCV (95 in Roman numerals)

Technical information
- Licensing authority: FCC
- Facility ID: 71693
- Class: A
- ERP: 6,000 watts
- HAAT: 100 meters (330 ft)
- Transmitter coordinates: 28°50′3.00″N 82°39′34.00″W

Links
- Public license information: Public file; LMS
- Webcast: Listen Live
- Website: citrus953.com

WXCV (95.3 FM) is a radio station broadcasting a hot adult contemporary format. Licensed to Homosassa Springs, Florida, United States, the station is owned by Betty Lou Marcocci, Stephen Schurdell, and Rusty Marcocci, through licensee WGUL-FM, Inc., and features programming from Westwood One and Compass Media Networks.
