= WIAM (AM) =

- Williamston, North Carolina; United States
- Broadcast area: Greenville, North Carolina
- Frequency: 900 kHz

Programming
- Format: Classic country

Ownership
- Owner: Lifeline Ministries

History
- Call sign meaning: Where Industry and Agriculture Meet or Williamston

Technical information
- Licensing authority: FCC
- Class: B
- Power: 1,000 watts day 258 watts night
- Transmitter coordinates: 35°51′27″N 77°02′34″W
- Translator: 92.1 W221ES (Williamston)

Links
- Public license information: Public file; LMS
- Website: radio900.net

WIAM (900 kHz) is a non-commercial AM radio station broadcasting a classic country format. Licensed to Williamston, North Carolina, it serves the Greenville radio market. The station is owned by Lifeline Ministries and airs a classic country and a Christian radio format, including religious instruction programs and Southern Gospel music.

WIAM is heard on FM translator W221ES at 92.1 MHz.

== History ==
In March 1951, WIAM first signed on the air.

== Translators ==
Call sign	Frequency	City of license	FID	ERP (W)	Class	FCC info
W221ES	92.1 FM	Williamston, North Carolina	147622	250	D	LMS
