= WKXV =

Radio station in Knoxville, Tennessee

Knoxville, Tennessee; United States
- Broadcast area: Knoxville
- Frequency: 900 kHz
- Branding: Knoxville's Best

Programming
- Format: Religious

Ownership
- Owner: Ra-Tel Broadcasting Company, Inc.; (ABC Radio Network)
- Sister stations: WKXV-TV

Technical information
- Licensing authority: FCC
- Facility ID: 54446
- Class: B
- Power: 1,000 watts day 258 watts night
- Transmitter coordinates: 35°58′52.00″N 83°59′15.00″W
- Translator: 100.7 W264CJ (Knoxville)

Links
- Public license information: Public file; LMS
- Webcast: http://player.fullviewplayer.com/?pid=551
- Website: wkxvradio.com

WKXV (900 AM and WKXV-FM 100.7, "Knoxville's Best") is a radio station broadcasting a religious format. The station serves the Knoxville, Tennessee area. The station is currently owned by Ra-Tel Broadcasting Company, Inc.

WKXV has been consistent in its format since 1953. WKXV hosts many different denominations among the various local and national religious/talk programs. Many of the locally produced programs are broadcast live from the WKXV studios. Some are broadcast from their church via live remote or tape delayed. It broadcasts community news, local church events, and other function several times daily.

WKXV is locally owned and operated by Ra-Tel Broadcasting Co. Inc., and operates on a daytime power of 1000 watts and late-night power of 258 watts.

WKXV Radio began broadcasting February 14, 1953. WKXV broadcasts 50% Religious/Talk Programming and devotes the other 50% to Southern, Traditional, and Christian Country Gospel Music. It also broadcasts many nationally syndicated religious programs as well as locally produced programs produced by area churches, pastors and evangelists.
