= KYAP =

Radio station in Nunn, Colorado

- Nunn, Colorado; United States
- Broadcast area: Fort Collins-Greeley
- Frequency: 96.9 MHz
- Branding: La Guapa 96.9

Programming
- Format: Regional Mexican

Ownership
- Owner: La Guapa Broadcasting Ideas, Inc.

History
- First air date: October 18, 1999
- Former call signs: KBPV (1999–1999); KKRR (1999–2001); KHAT (2001–2003); KIMX (2003–2016)
- Former frequencies: 96.7 MHz (2002–2017)

Technical information
- Licensing authority: FCC
- Facility ID: 82007
- Class: A
- ERP: 4,300 watts
- HAAT: 115 meters (377 ft)
- Transmitter coordinates: 40°46′51″N 104°53′17″W

Links
- Public license information: Public file; LMS
- Website: laguapa969.com

KYAP (96.9 FM) is a radio station licensed to Nunn, Colorado, and is owned by La Guapa Broadcasting Ideas, Inc. It airs a Regional Mexican radio format.

== History ==
The station went on the air as KBPV on October 18, 1999. On November 1, 1999, the station changed its call sign to KKRR. On November 7, 2001, the callsign changed again, this time to KHAT. On November 18, 2003, the callsign changed once more, to KIMX.

On November 21, 2016, the 96.9 frequency began testing with a simulcast of oldies-formatted KJMP (870 AM), in Pierce, Colorado. The previous contemporary hit radio (CHR) format moved to KIMX (104.5 FM) Centennial, Wyoming. On November 23, 2016, KIMX changed its call sign to KYAP.

On November 8, 2019, KYAP became "K96.9" playing classic country. The radio station is currently operated under LMA by Loud Media.

On September 13, 2024, KYAP changed their format from classic country to Regional Mexican, branded as "La Guapa Radio". This format was brought over from KSIK-LP, 95.3 in Greeley.
