= KERX =

- Paris, Arkansas; United States
- Broadcast area: Fort Smith, Arkansas
- Frequency: 95.3 MHz
- Branding: ESPN Arkansas

Programming
- Language: English
- Format: Sports radio
- Affiliations: ESPN Radio

Ownership
- Owner: Pearson Broadcasting; (Pearson Broadcasting of Paris, Inc.)
- Sister stations: KTTG

History
- First air date: 1981
- Former call signs: KLEO Caulksville Arkansas (1981–1984) KXXS (1984–1985); KCCL-FM (1985–1993)

Technical information
- Licensing authority: FCC
- Facility ID: 40744
- Class: C2
- ERP: 50,000 watts
- HAAT: 140 meters (460 ft)
- Transmitter coordinates: 35°17′13″N 94°02′52″W

Links
- Public license information: Public file; LMS
- Website: hitthatline.com

KERX (95.3 FM, "ESPN Arkansas") is an American radio station licensed to serve the community of Paris, Arkansas. The station is owned and operated by Pearson Broadcasting. The broadcast license is held by Pearson Broadcasting of Paris, Inc.

KERX broadcasts a sports radio format to the greater Fort Smith, Arkansas, area.

The station was assigned the call sign "KERX" by the Federal Communications Commission (FCC) on May 3, 1993.

== History ==
Former branding (2007–2009)

Until December 21, 2007, KERX carried a modern rock music format under the branding "The X". From 2007 through 2009, the station aired a classic rock format branded as "The Rebel".

Previous branding (2009-2014)

From 2009 through 2014, the station aired an adult hits format branded as "Max FM".

In March 2014, the station switched to a sports radio format branded as “ESPN Arkansas".
