= KMGZ =

Coordinates: 34.577°N 98.475°W

- Lawton, Oklahoma; United States
- Broadcast area: Lawton, Oklahoma
- Frequency: 95.3 MHz (HD Radio)
- Branding: Magic 95

Programming
- Format: Hot adult contemporary
- Subchannels: HD2: Hot Country 97.3 (Country); HD3: Sooner Classic Hits 105.5 (Classic hits)

Ownership
- Owner: Broadco of Texas, Inc. (Fred Morton)

Technical information
- Licensing authority: FCC
- Facility ID: 7097
- Class: C3
- ERP: 14,000 watts
- HAAT: 88 meters (289 ft)
- Translators: HD2: 97.3 K247BA (Lawton); HD3: 105.5 K288FQ (Lawton)

Links
- Public license information: Public file; LMS
- Website: magic953.com hotcountry973 soonerclassichits105.5

KMGZ (95.3 FM) is a radio station broadcasting a hot adult contemporary format. The station serves the Lawton, Oklahoma area. It is owned by Fred Morton through Broadco of Texas Incorporated, which has operated the station for its entire existence. Although the station has no formal affiliation with the school, the studios are located on the campus of Cameron University. The transmitter is located southwest of the city.

== Translators ==
Broadcast translator for KMGZ-HD2
Call sign	Frequency	City of license	FID	ERP (W)	HAAT	Class	FCC info
K247BA	97.3 FM	Lawton, Oklahoma	157040	145	46.5 m (153 ft)	D	LMS

Broadcast translator for KMGZ-HD3
Call sign	Frequency	City of license	FID	ERP (W)	HAAT	Class	FCC info
K288FQ	105.5 FM	Lawton, Oklahoma	157037	230	46.5 m (153 ft)	D	LMS
