= WXEI-LP =

- Crestview, Florida; United States
- Broadcast area: Crestview
- Frequency: 95.3 MHz

Programming
- Format: News/Talk

Ownership
- Owner: X-Static Enterprises Inc.

History
- First air date: 2004-02-03

Technical information
- Licensing authority: FCC
- Facility ID: 134286
- Class: L1
- ERP: 100 watts
- HAAT: 28.1 meters
- Transmitter coordinates: 30°45′42.00″N 86°34′14.00″W

Links
- Public license information: LMS

WXEI-LP (95.3 FM) is a radio station broadcasting a News/Talk radio format. Licensed to Crestview, Florida, United States, the station serves the Crestview/Fort Walton Beach area. As of 2026 the station was owned by X-Static Enterprises Inc. WXEI's most popular aired program is the nationally syndicated radio talk show "Jon Arthur Live!" airing Monday-Friday at 7 PM Central. Jon Arthur Live! is also broadcast on the First Amendment Radio Network.
