= WMNH-LP =

- Manchester, New Hampshire; United States
- Frequency: 95.3 MHz
- Branding: WMNH-LP 95.3 FM

Programming
- Format: Variety

Ownership
- Owner: Manchester Public Television Service

History
- Call sign meaning: Manchester, New Hampshire

Technical information
- Licensing authority: FCC
- Facility ID: 192592
- Class: LP1
- ERP: 90 watts
- HAAT: 32 meters (105 ft)
- Transmitter coordinates: 42°59′34.6″N 71°27′48.2″W

Links
- Public license information: LMS
- Webcast: Listen live
- Website: www.wmnhradio.org

WMNH-LP (95.3 FM, "WMNH-LP 95.3 FM") is a radio station licensed to serve the community of Manchester, New Hampshire. The station is owned by Manchester Public Television Service and airs a variety format.

The station was assigned the WMNH-LP call letters by the Federal Communications Commission on October 21, 2014.

The two longest-running programs on the station are the talk shows The Morning Show with Peter White and Matt Connarton Unleashed.
