= WJKE =

Stillwater, New York; United States
- Broadcast area: Saratoga County, Capital Region
- Frequency: 101.3 MHz
- Branding: K-Love

Programming
- Format: Contemporary Christian music
- Affiliations: K-Love

Ownership
- Owner: Educational Media Foundation
- Sister stations: WYAI, WYKV

History
- First air date: October 3, 1988 (as WSSV)
- Former call signs: WSSV (1988–1994); WJKE (1994–1998); WQAR (1998–2012)
- Call sign meaning: horse racing jockey

Technical information
- Licensing authority: FCC
- Class: A
- ERP: 2,900 watts
- HAAT: 143 meters (469 ft)
- Transmitter coordinates: 43.012°N 73.683°W

Links
- Public license information: Public file; LMS
- Webcast: Listen live
- Website: www.klove.com

WJKE (101.3 FM, "K-Love") is a contemporary Christian music radio station licensed to Stillwater, New York, United States, and serving Saratoga County as an affiliate of the K-Love network. It is owned by the Educational Media Foundation and broadcasts at 2,900 watts ERP from a tower in Stillwater. In addition to its key coverage area, WJKE is a rimshot into both the Glens Falls/Lake George area and the tri-cities of Albany, Schenectady and Troy.

== History ==
The station began broadcasting in 1988 as WSSV, a full-service adult contemporary station that served mainly the nearby city of Saratoga Springs. Sold by its original owners in April 1994, the station reimaged itself as WJKE ("The Jockey"), a name referring to the nearby Saratoga Race Course. When WJKE became the first station bought by the Anastos Media Group in October 1998, the station was rebranded again as WQAR ("Star 101.3"). As WQAR, the adult contemporary format featured an emphasis on gold-based adult contemporary hits from the 1980s and 1990s, along with some currents. The radio station aired Christmas music during the holiday season. The Christmas music tradition ended in 2012, just before WJKE switched formats from Gold AC to Hot AC.

Ernie Anastos sold his Albany-area stations—WQAR, WABY, WUAM and its translator W291BY, and WVKZ—to Empire Broadcasting Corporation in June 2012 at a purchase price of $1.2 million. The transaction was consummated on September 7, 2012. On September 8, 2012, the station reverted to the WJKE call sign. On February 27, 2013, WJKE returned to the "Jockey" branding.

WJKE previously aired several nationally syndicated radio shows including "Intelligence For Your Life" with John Tesh, Your Weekend with Jim Brickman, and "Retro Pop Reunion" with Joe Cortez. The station no longer carries these programs as of 2013.

On November 15, 2017, Empire Broadcasting sold WJKE to Educational Media Foundation for $550,000. EMF flipped the station to its K-Love network upon the sale's closure on February 1, 2018. The signal was paired with WYKV, as its coverage contour nearly ends where WJKE's begins.
