= KSIK-LP =

- Greeley, Colorado; United States
- Broadcast area: Greeley
- Frequency: 95.3 MHz

Programming
- Format: Variety

Ownership
- Owner: Colorado Progressive Congregation

History
- First air date: September 2016

Technical information
- Licensing authority: FCC
- Facility ID: 196062
- Class: FL
- ERP: 61 watts
- HAAT: 39 meters (128 ft)
- Transmitter coordinates: 40°23′23.90″N 104°43′00.50″W

Links
- Public license information: LMS

KSIK-LP (95.3 FM) is a low-power non-commercial radio station licensed to Greeley, Colorado, United States. The station is designated as a Low Power FM (LPFM) facility. It is owned by Colorado Progressive Congregation. The station's transmitter is located on the southeastern side of Greeley.

== History ==
The FCC officially assigned the call sign KSIK-LP to the station on November 7, 2014. The license to cover was formally granted on September 9, 2016. The station aired a Regional Mexican format known as "La Guapa Radio".

As an NCE station, KSIK-LP is governed by strict underwriting rules that prohibit it from airing commercials, a restriction often enforced by the FCC, as demonstrated by a $15,000 fine levied against a nearby Greeley LPFM station for airing thousands of spots. The FCC upholds strong enforcement of these restrictions to preserve the unique, commercial-free nature of low-power FM service. In 2024, the station's former programming, which included a Regional Mexican show titled "El Show Del Chito Pikiny La Donia Cuca", was absorbed by a new commercial station in the Fort Collins market, KYAP, licensed to Nunn.
