= KHCA =

Coordinates: 39.2097°N 96.3517°W

- Wamego, Kansas; United States
- Broadcast area: Manhattan, Kansas
- Frequency: 95.3 (MHz)
- Branding: "Angel 95"

Programming
- Format: Christian

Ownership
- Owner: KHCA, Inc

History
- First air date: 1990

Technical information
- Class: A
- ERP: 6,000 watts
- HAAT: 99 meters (325 ft)

Links
- Website: http://www.angel95fm.com

KHCA (95.3 FM) "Angel 95" is a Contemporary Christian Music formatted radio station licensed to Wamego, Kansas. It broadcasts to the Wamego, Manhattan, Junction City, and Topeka areas broadcasting on 95.3 MHz with an ERP of 6,000 watts. The station is owned by KHCA, Inc., and managed by Jerry Hutchinson.

== Programming ==
KHCA programming includes a combination of Contemporary Christian Music, local programming, and a variety of syndicated Christian programs. Programs include material from Focus on the Family, Christian Author Joni Eareckson Tada's program "Joni and Friends", author and Christian Comedian Ken Davis, and a weekly Christian Top 20 countdown.

== History ==
The license for 95.3 MHz in Wamego, Kansas, was first issued under the call letters KAWQ in September 1985. The original licensee intended to use the Wamego license to operate a Top 40 radio station in the Manhattan market. To that end, the station's transmitter was located just outside Wamego, but the studios and sales offices were situated in downtown Manhattan. Due to construction delays, another station, KQLA, beat KAWQ to the airwaves as a Top 40 station in February 1986. KQLA immediately gained the top rated spot in the market and with another station using "Q" in its moniker, KAWQ applied for call sign change to KSKT, meaning "Kansas Kat", named for the local Kansas State University Wildcats. The station was unable to generate enough sales revenue or find a buyer before inevitable bankruptcy and went silent on January 2, 1990.

Shortly after the station went silent, the Heartland Christian Association purchased the license and studios and resumed broadcasting as a commercially licensed Contemporary Christian formatted station in August of that year. The station is now owned and managed by Jerry Hutchinson, President of KHCA, Inc.
