= Husein Alicajic =

Australian filmmaker

Husein Alicajic is an Australian filmmaker who writes and directs for film and television, known for award-winning commercials for Foxtel.

== Background ==
Born in Sydney, Australia, to a Bosnian Muslim father and a Scottish mother, Alicajic attended Newington College (1983–88). He attained degrees in Economics (Hons), Philosophy and Communications before deciding to become a filmmaker.

== Career ==
With director Alex Proyas, Alicajic created a pre-trailer for the 20th Century Fox film I, Robot. In 2008, while with Arithmetic, Alicajic produced a campaign for Foxtel, winning a gold Promax Award. In 2009 he moved from Arithmetic and joined Photoplay.

Alicajic collaborated with UK writer Jeff Noon on his IF award-winning script Divine Shadows, which is currently in pre-production for shooting to begin in 2010. As part of a two-picture deal Alicajic has also signed to direct the AMPAS Nicholl Fellowship winning feature screenplay The Secret Boy.

== Partial filmography ==
- The Red Room (1997)
- Beginnings (2002)
- Still Life (2005/IV)
- Harry the Hunchback (2005)
- Aquamarine (2006)

== Awards and nominations ==
- 2002, Won Dendy Award for 'Best Short Film' Beginnings at the Sydney Film Festival
- 2005, Won Inside Film Award for 'Best Unproduced Screenplay' Divine Shadows.
- 2008, Won Promax Award for 'Best in Show Gold' for his Foxtel Summer campaign
- 2009, Won Golden Trailer Award for 'Best Unproduced Movie Trailer'
- 2011, Won New York Festivals World's Best TV & Films for 'Best Direction' Gold World Medal
- 2015, Won Best Ads for 'Best TV Campaign' MND Australia: The Fading Symphony
- 2016, Highly Commended Australian Directors' Guild for 'Best Direction in a TV Commercial'
- 2016, Short List Cannes Lions International Festival of Creativity for 'Film Craft' MND Australia: The Fading Symphony
- 2016, Short List Clio Awards for 'Film Technique' MND Australia: The Fading Symphony
- 2016, Won Ciclope Festival Silver for 'Adapted Music' MND Australia: The Fading Symphony'
- 2017, Nominated Australian Directors' Guild for 'Best Direction of Commercial Content'
- 2017, Silver Award for 'Film & Video - Charity' MND Australia: The Fading Symphony'
- 2017, Finalist New York Festivals For the Worlds Best Advertising for PSA 'MND Australia: The Fading Symphony'
- 2018, Finalist Australian Directors' Guild for 'Best Direction in a TV Commercial'
- 2019, Finalist Association of Independent Commercial Producers 'Commercial Directors Diversity Program'
- 2020, Winner Australian Directors' Guild for 'Best Direction of an Online Drama Series'
