= KLCR =

- Lakeview, Oregon; United States
- Frequency: 95.3 MHz
- Branding: Lake County Radio

Programming
- Format: Adult contemporary

Ownership
- Owner: Woodrow Michael Warren

History
- First air date: 2003
- Call sign meaning: Lake County Radio

Technical information
- Licensing authority: FCC
- Facility ID: 82295
- Class: C3
- ERP: 780 watts
- HAAT: 420 meters (1,380 ft)
- Transmitter coordinates: 42°12′40″N 120°19′35″W

Links
- Public license information: Public file; LMS
- Website: lakecountyradio.com

KLCR (95.3 FM, using the trademark "Lake County Radio") is a radio station broadcasting an adult contemporary music format. Licensed to Lakeview, Oregon, United States, the station is currently owned by Woodrow Michael Warren.
