= KXDM-LP =

- Worland, Wyoming; United States
- Frequency: 95.3 MHz
- Branding: Divine Mercy Radio

Programming
- Format: Religious
- Affiliations: EWTN Radio

Ownership
- Owner: Divine Mercy Radio

History
- First air date: 2014

Technical information
- Licensing authority: FCC
- Facility ID: 194553
- Class: L1
- ERP: 100 watts
- HAAT: −3.39 meters (−11.1 ft)
- Transmitter coordinates: 44°01′15″N 107°53′58″W

Links
- Public license information: LMS
- Webcast: Listen live
- Website: dvmercy.coma

KXDM-LP (95.3 FM) is a low-power FM radio station broadcasting in a religious format. Licensed to Worland, Wyoming, United States, the station is currently owned by Divine Mercy Radio.

Divine Mercy Radio is the collective name for several independent, non-profit, lay apostolate organizations dedicated to Catholic broadcasting across the United States.

The core format is Catholic Talk and Teaching. Programming is typically drawn from major Catholic networks such as EWTN Radio.

The station broadcasts from a tower east of Worland.
