= WAMC (AM) =

Satellite of WAMC-FM, Albany
- Albany, New York; United States
- Broadcast area: Capital District
- Frequency: 1400 kHz
- Branding: WAMC, Northeast Public Radio

Programming
- Format: Public radio
- Affiliations: National Public Radio

Ownership
- Owner: WAMC

History
- First air date: August 1, 1930 (as WBGF in Glens Falls)
- Former call signs: WBGF (1930–1932); WESG (1932); WGLC (1932–1934); WABY (1934–2002); WHTR (2002–2003)
- Call sign meaning: Albany Medical College (original licensee of WAMC-FM)

Technical information
- Licensing authority: FCC
- Facility ID: 4683
- Class: C
- Power: 1,000 watts
- Transmitter coordinates: 42°41′21.28″N 73°47′35.44″W

Links
- Public license information: Public file; LMS
- Website: www.wamc.org

WAMC (1400 AM) is a public radio station licensed to Albany, New York. Along with WAMC-FM 90.3, the station serves as a flagship station of the Northeast Public Radio network, which carries a listener-supported, commercial-free radio format of news, talk and eclectic music. The WAMC stations are members of National Public Radio (NPR).

WAMC is a Class C AM station transmitting 1,000 watts, using a non-directional antenna. With WAMC-FM's tower in Western Massachusetts, some listeners in the Albany area may tune in AM 1400 if they have trouble receiving the FM signal. WAMC's transmitter is on Braintree Street in Albany, near the New York State Thruway. Its studios are on Central Avenue in Albany.

== History ==
WAMC was first licensed on August 1, 1930, to W. Neal Parker and Herbert M. Metcalfe as WBGF in Glens Falls, New York, and initially broadcast on 1370 kHz.

In 1932, the station's license was assigned to O. T. Griffin and G. F. Bisssel, representatives for the Elmira Star-Gazette, and the call sign became WESG. The newspaper proposed to move the station to Elmira and change its frequency to 1420 kHz. However, this plan was abandoned a few months later, when the newspaper decided to instead lease WEAI, the radio station at Cornell University in Ithaca. The WESG call letters were transferred to the Ithaca operation, with the Glens Falls station changing its call sign to WGLC, and remaining on 1370 kHz. The next year WGLC moved to Hudson Falls.

In late 1934, the call letters were changed to WABY, when Al Kelert moved the station to Albany. This made WABY one of the first stations to broadcast from New York's capital city, along with WOKO (now WOPG). WABY moved to 1400 kHz in 1941 due to the North American Regional Broadcasting Agreement (NARBA) frequency shift.

In its early years, WABY was a network affiliate of both the Mutual Broadcasting System (MBS) and the NBC Blue Network. The station provided the typical mix of popular music and network programming throughout most of its first 30 years of service.

In 1961, the station changed to a high energy top-40 format, which was short-lived as the competition in that format was intense; WABY would leave this format in late 1963. From late 1963 to 1971, WABY ran a middle of the road format, followed by oldies in 1971, and a return to top-40 in 1973. By 1976, it had changed to all-news, using NBC's "News and Information Service". It then switched to country in 1979. In 1981, WABY changed to a Christian format; a year later, it flipped to adult standards. Getting many key market names, WABY spent years as one of the highest-rated standards stations in the United States, and added an FM simulcast on WEMX (94.5 MHz) in 1995.

In February 1999, Bendat sold his stations to Tele-Media, Inc., which switched the AM side to an all-news format by day with simulcasting of WABY-FM (the former WEMX, which itself would flip to adult contemporary as WKLI that summer) on nights and weekends. This arrangement remained through Tele-Media's ownership of the station, the company's sale of WABY and WKLI to Galaxy Communications in August 2001, and the flip of 94.5 FM to classic rock as WRCZ.

On April 22, 2002, after 68 years, the WABY calls left 1400 kHz as Galaxy replaced it with WHTR. The new call sign reflected a new format: a hot talk simulcast with a new move-in station at 93.7 FM. (As a tribute, a radio station in Mechanicville adopted the WABY call letters from 2002 to 2014; that station's owners then moved the call sign to a co-owned station in Watervliet).

The talk format was short-lived, and that August, 1400 and 93.7 switched to modern rock; while WHTR-FM concurrently changed its call sign to WKRD, 1400 retained the WHTR calls. Galaxy sold WHTR to Northeast Public Radio in February 2003, giving it the WAMC calls (with 90.3 FM modifying its own call sign to WAMC-FM as a result). The WABY call sign was displayed on the WAMC tower until 2008.

== See also ==
- WAMC-FM
