= WKVN =

- Morganfield, Kentucky; United States
- Broadcast area: Evansville, Indiana
- Frequency: 95.3 MHz

Programming
- Network: K-Love

Ownership
- Owner: Educational Media Foundation

History
- Former call signs: WMSK-FM (1967–2006); WEZG (2006–2009)

Technical information
- Licensing authority: FCC
- Facility ID: 68810
- Class: C3
- ERP: 25,000 watts
- HAAT: 82.0 meters
- Transmitter coordinates: 37°46′38″N 87°37′26″W

Links
- Public license information: Public file; LMS
- Website: http://www.klove.com

WKVN (95.3 FM) is a radio station broadcasting the K-Love network. Licensed to Morganfield, Kentucky, United States, the station serves the Evansville area. The station is currently owned by the Educational Media Foundation and broadcasts out of Rocklin, California.

== History ==
The station was first licensed on August 4, 1967, and held the call sign WMSK-FM. On 2006-11-01, the station changed its call sign to WEZG. On 2009-02-29, the call sign was changed again to reflect the new format and ownership.
