= WTBG =

- Brownsville, Tennessee; United States
- Frequency: 95.3 MHz
- Branding: 95.3 Brownsville Radio

Programming
- Format: News Talk Information
- Affiliations: Cumulus Media Networks

Ownership
- Owner: Wireless Group, Inc.
- Sister stations: WNWS

History
- First air date: 1970

Technical information
- Licensing authority: FCC
- Facility ID: 66659
- Class: A
- ERP: 5,000 watts
- HAAT: 46.0 meters (150.9 ft)
- Transmitter coordinates: 35°36′30.00″N 89°14′40.00″W

Links
- Public license information: Public file; LMS

WTBG (95.3 FM, "95.3 Brownsville Radio") is a radio station broadcasting a News Talk Information format. Licensed to Brownsville, Tennessee, United States, the station is currently owned by Wireless Group, Inc. and features programming from Cumulus Media Networks.
