= WABY =

- Watervliet, New York; United States
- Broadcast area: Capital District
- Frequency: 900 kHz
- Branding: 93.9 WABY

Programming
- Format: 1990s-2000s Active rock
- Affiliations: Compass Media Networks; United Stations Radio Networks

Ownership
- Owner: Loud Media LLC
- Sister stations: WSSV

History
- First air date: 1964
- Former call signs: WKAJ (1964–1992); WBGG (1992–1994); WCKM (1994–1996); WKAJ (1996–1999); WUAM (1999–2014)
- Call sign meaning: Albany (former call sign of WAMC and WSSV)

Technical information
- Licensing authority: FCC
- Facility ID: 72620
- Class: D
- Power: 400 watts day; 70 watts night
- Transmitter coordinates: 42°41′21.28″N 73°47′35.44″W
- Translator: 93.9 W230DK (Albany)

Links
- Public license information: Public file; LMS
- Webcast: Listen live
- Website: www.939waby.com

WABY (900 AM) is a commercial radio station licensed to Watervliet, New York, and serving the Capital District. The station broadcasts a 1990s-2000s Oriented Active Rock radio format and is owned by Loud Media.

By day, WABY transmits 400 watts. Because 900 AM is a Mexican clear channel frequency, WABY must reduce power at night to 70 watts to avoid interference. It uses a non-directional antenna at all times. Programming is also heard on FM translator W230DK at 93.9 MHz in Albany.

== History ==
WSPN, Saratoga Springs, was the first local occupant of 900 kHz, taking to the air in 1954. The station voluntarily turned in its license in 1962 after the FCC determined its owner was in violation of multiple-ownership regulations (he also owned that city's only other radio station). After the frequency was vacated, WKAJ began broadcasting there in February, 1964, winning its permanent license in 1965. For many years the station broadcast a middle of the road format. In 1992, the call letters were changed to WBGG, and the format to country. In 1994, the station changed its call sign to WCKM, and its format to oldies. In 1996, the call letters reverted to WKAJ, and the format was changed to nostalgia. In 1999, WKAJ became WUAM; the antenna was moved to Watervliet in April 2008, splitting from the simulcast with WABY (1160 AM) to repeat Capital News 9's television audio. Beginning in April 2011, the station was relayed on 106.1 FM via translator W291BY, broadcasting from Albany, New York, at 250 watts ERP.

Ernie Anastos sold his Albany-area stations—WUAM and its translator, WABY, WQAR, and WVKZ—to Empire Broadcasting Corporation in June 2012 at a purchase price of $1.2 million. The transaction was consummated on September 7, 2012.

On May 27, 2014, WUAM changed its format to adult standards, branded as "Moon Radio". The station became WABY on July 3, 2014; the call sign was previously used by sister station WAIX, and before then on what are now WAMC and WYKV. On March 12, 2018, the adult standards format was dropped when Empire Broadcasting transferred its "The X" adult album alternative format from WAIX to WABY.

On May 15, 2018, WABY and its sister AM stations went silent (off the air). The stations' owner noted that, although the sale of an FM sister station cleared all of the stations' debts, the stations were still operating at a loss and that until a freeze on FM translator awards was lifted, the stations could not be sustained.

The station was acquired by Saratoga Radio LLC on October 1, 2019, and the FCC approved the transaction on December 16, 2019. The station was now simulcast with WSSV (the former WAIX) and was known as "Saratoga's Star Radio".

On December 9, 2020, WABY changed its format from classic hits to a simulcast of classic country-formatted WNYV, branded as "K94.1". As of March 2023, WABY returned to simulcasting WSSV.

On November 16, 2023, at 9:39 p.m., after ending the WSSV simulcast and stunting for several days with simulated construction sounds, WABY launched a 1990s-2000s rock format, branded as "93.9 WABY" (reflecting its FM simulcast on translator 93.9 W230DK).

== Translator ==
Broadcast translator for WABY
Call sign	Frequency	City of license	FID	ERP (W)	Class	Transmitter coordinates	FCC info
W230DK	93.9 FM	Albany, New York	201714	12	D	42°42′50″N 73°31′38″W	LMS
