= WYCV =

- Granite Falls, North Carolina; United States
- Frequency: 900 kHz

Programming
- Format: Gospel Music

Ownership
- Owner: Freedom Broadcasting Corporation

History
- Former call signs: WKJK

Technical information
- Licensing authority: FCC
- Facility ID: 22552
- Class: B
- Power: 2,500 watts day 251 watts night
- Transmitter coordinates: 35°47′10″N 81°25′00″W
- Translators: W254DX (98.7 MHz, Granite Falls)

Links
- Public license information: Public file; LMS

WYCV (900 AM) is a radio station broadcasting a Gospel Music format. The station is licensed to Granite Falls, North Carolina, United States, and is currently owned by Freedom Broadcasting Corporation.

== History ==
After playing country and western for almost 20 years, on June 10, 1983, WKJK changed its format to gospel music, with many positive comments.

On December 1, 1985, WKJK changed its call letters to WYCV.
