= WWOK-LP =

Coordinates: 34.941°N 82.413°W

- Greenville, South Carolina; United States
- Frequency: 95.3 MHz
- Branding: WWOK-LP 95.3

Programming
- Format: Easy listening

Ownership
- Owner: Missionary Broadcasters Inc.

History
- First air date: 2004

Technical information
- Licensing authority: FCC
- Facility ID: 131869
- Class: L1
- ERP: 1 watt
- HAAT: 342 meters

Links
- Public license information: LMS

WWOK-LP (95.3 FM) is a non-commercial LPFM radio station located in Greenville, South Carolina, that features Easy Listening music. The station is licensed by the FCC to broadcast with an ERP of 1 watt.

== Station history ==
WWOK-LP signed on February 5, 2004. It is owned by Missionary Broadcasters Inc.
