= 6EBA-FM =

Radio station in Perth, Western Australia

Coordinates: 31.9335°S 115.8592°E

6EBA
- Perth; Australia
- Frequency: 95.3 MHz

Programming
- Format: Community

History
- First air date: 1990
- Last air date: August 2024

6EBA (95.3 FM) was a multicultural broadcast radio station in Perth, Western Australia. It was Perth's only full-time, community owned and operated multilingual radio station, which began broadcasting from its first studio in View Street, North Perth in 1990.

Hosting 82 different languages, 6EBA's programming included contributions from new and emerging communities to the older established ethnic communities such as Greek, Italian, Arabic and Bosnian, Serbian, Croatian languages. These programs served to keep ethnic communities in touch with what was happening at a local, national and international level.

6EBA had 2 studios, one situated in Fitzgerald Street, North Perth and the other in Maylands.

The station unceremoniously ceased operations in August 2024. The incorporation behind the licence (Multicultural Radio and TV Broadcasters WA) was wound up by the Commissioner for Consumer Protection. The station's license was set to expire on 10 December 2025.

However, the station is still part of the lineup on 9B (multiplex DAB+ Perth) : https://www.digitalbitrate.com/dtv.php?mux=9B&cpid=2079260671&live=169&sec=0&lang=en
