= KTTF-LP =

Radio station in Tomball, Texas, United States

- Tomball, Texas; United States
- Broadcast area: Magnolia, Texas; Tomball, Texas; Harris County, Texas
- Frequency: 95.3 MHz
- Branding: KTTF 95.3 FM

Programming
- Format: Community Radio

Ownership
- Owner: City of Tomball; (Randall F. Parr; Tomball Fire Department Chief)

History
- First air date: November 30, 2015
- Call sign meaning: Tomball Texas FM

Technical information
- Licensing authority: FCC
- Facility ID: 197235
- Class: D
- ERP: 91 watts
- HAAT: 32 meters (105 ft)
- Transmitter coordinates: 30°4′13.20″N 95°42′38.20″W

Links
- Public license information: LMS
- Website: tomballtx.gov/625/KTTF---953-FM

KTTF-LP (95.3 FM) is a terrestrial American low power radio station, licensed to Tomball, Texas, United States, serving Harris County. The station is owned by the City of Tomball.
