= KORG-LP =

- Cleveland, Texas; United States
- Frequency: 95.3 MHz
- Branding: KORG-LP FM

Programming
- Format: Oldies

Ownership
- Owner: Operation Refuge, Inc.

Technical information
- Licensing authority: FCC
- Facility ID: 134879
- Class: L1
- ERP: 64 watts
- HAAT: 36 metres (118 ft)
- Transmitter coordinates: 30°21′31″N 95°05′00″W

Links
- Public license information: LMS

KORG-LP (95.3 FM) is a radio station licensed to serve the community of Cleveland, Texas. The station is owned by Operation Refuge, Inc. It airs an oldies music format.

The station was assigned the KORG-LP call letters by the Federal Communications Commission on May 13, 2003.
