= WSSV =

Radio station in Mechanicville–Albany, New York

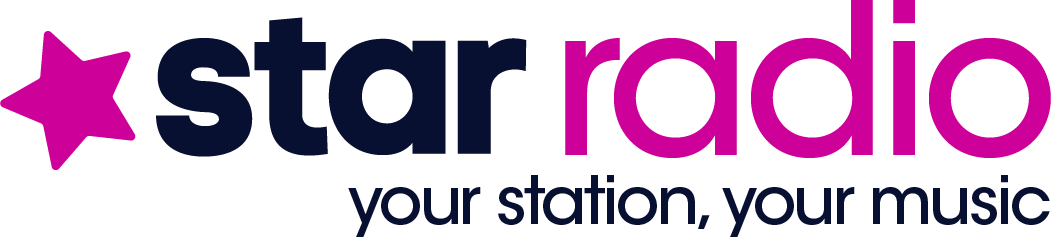
- Mechanicville, New York; United States
- Broadcast area: Capital District
- Frequency: 1160 kHz
- Branding: Star Radio

Programming
- Format: Classic hits
- Affiliations: ABC News Radio; Compass Media Networks; United Stations Radio Networks

Ownership
- Owner: Loud Media LLC
- Sister stations: WABY

History
- First air date: 1973 (as WMVI at 1170)
- Former call signs: WMVI (1972–2002); WABY (2002–2014); WAIX (2014–2019)
- Former frequencies: 1170 kHz (1973-1980s)
- Call sign meaning: "Saratoga Springs Voice"

Technical information
- Licensing authority: FCC
- Facility ID: 41582
- Class: B
- Power: 5,000 watts day 570 watts night
- Transmitter coordinates: 42°55′12.3″N 73°42′6.4″W
- Translator: 93.3 W227DW (Saratoga Springs)

Links
- Public license information: Public file; LMS
- Webcast: Listen Live
- Website: starsaratoga.com

WSSV (1160 AM) is a commercial radio station licensed to Mechanicville, New York, and serving the Capital District. The station broadcasts a classic hits radio format and is owned by Loud Media LLC.

By day, WSSV transmits with 5,000 watts, but because 1160 AM is a clear channel frequency reserved for KSL in Salt Lake City, WSSV must greatly reduce power at night to 570 watts. It uses a non-directional antenna at all times. Programming is also heard on FM translator W227DW at 93.3 MHz in Saratoga Springs.

== History ==
In 1973, the station signed on the air as WMVI. It broadcast at 1170 kHz with 250 watts, daytime only. It was originally owned by John Farrina and had an adult standards and big band format. Early disc jockeys included Don Kirby, John Butler, and René Tetro. WMVI had a race wire installed for its DJs to broadcast thoroughbred and harness racing results, three times per hour from 1 pm until sign off, a unique feature in the Albany region. This helped the station gain an audience while competing with larger Albany stations, especially with the Saratoga Race Course nearby.

WPTR legend "Boom Boom Branigan" (Joe Motto), who also owned other small AM stations around the Northeast U.S., purchased WMVI in 1979. Following the change in ownership, the station had a hybrid format of oldies and standards, which underwent little change until the early 1990s. During the late 1980s, WMVI had secured a construction permit from the Federal Communications Commission (FCC) to switch to 1160 kHz with 50,000 watts daytime power and modest nighttime power. However, ownership could not afford the upgrades the station needed for the high-power directional operation. The permit was left to expire.

Later, WMVI did secure another permit to switch to 1160 kHz with 5,000 watts days and 570 watts nights, non-directional. Coming under Branigan's ownership once again in late 1995, WMVI returned after a brief dark period. It had an oldies/variety format which featured Branigan himself as the centerpiece of the station. Though the format proved popular with local listeners, the station had a difficult time retaining advertising accounts due to repeated transmitter and telephone line failures. This forced the station off the air repeatedly, sometimes for days at a time. As station employees moved to more secure jobs and operating funds became scarce, Branigan leased the station in 1998 to a group which aired Urban Gospel music. Again, money shortages and aging, unreliable equipment forced Branigan to sell the station outright.

In August 2000, Anastos Media (owned by TV newscaster Ernie Anastos) bought WMVI. The company fixed the transmitter and equipment problems and brought it back on the air, playing 1960s–1970s hits as "Sunny 1160." It later entered into a simulcast with co-owned pop-standards station WUAM 900 AM in Saratoga Springs. Two years later, WMVI would take the abandoned WABY call sign as a tribute to the popular Top 40 station of the 1960s and 70s in Albany. The WUAM portion of the simulcast ended in April 2008, when AM 900 began carrying the audio from local cable TV news outlet Capital News 9.

Anastos sold his Albany-area stations, WABY, WQAR, WVKZ, WUAM and its translator W291BY, to Empire Broadcasting Corporation in June 2012, at a purchase price of $1.2 million. The transaction was consummated on September 7, 2012. W291BY would later switch its originating station from WUAM to WABY.

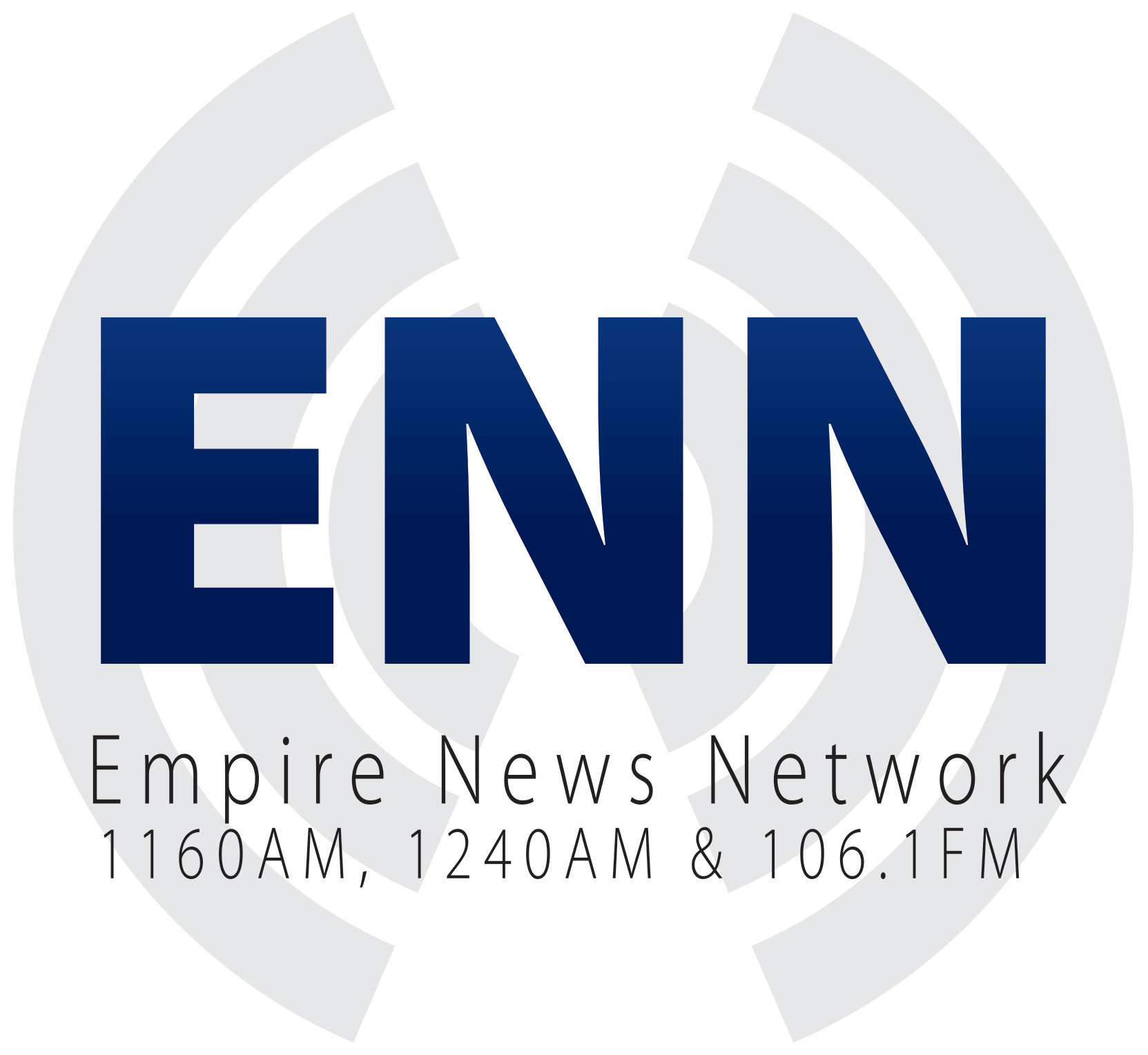
Logo as the "Empire News Network"

In May 2014, WABY began simulcasting on sister WUAM, which stopped carrying Capital News 9. On June 23, WABY began stunting with Gregorian chants. On June 26, at 4 pm, the station adopted an adult hits format, branded as "Mix 106.1." On June 26, 2014, the WABY call letters moved to WUAM, while 1160 adopted the WAIX calls to match the "Mix" branding. On June 27, 2016, WAIX changed their format from adult hits to business news, branded as "Empire News Network".

On June 1, 2017, WAIX changed their format from business news (which remained on sister station WPTR) to adult album alternative, branded as "106.1 The X". On March 12, 2018, WAIX changed their format from adult album alternative to hot adult contemporary, branded as "106.1 The Jockey". On May 15, 2018, WAIX and its sister AM stations went silent.

On May 6, 2019, Loud Media's Saratoga Radio LLC filed to acquire WSSV from Empire Broadcasting. Saratoga Radio LLC relaunched the station on May 15, 2019, as Saratoga's "Star Radio". On May 27, 2019, WAIX changed its call sign to WSSV.

On September 9, 2024, WSSV rebranded as "93.3 Lake FM".

On June 12, 2025, WSSV rebranded as "93.3 Fun FM".

On October 20, 2025, WSSV rebranded as "Star Radio".
