= Bayou Vista, Louisiana =

- Census-designated place
- Location of Bayou Vista in Louisiana
- Coordinates: 29°41′26″N 91°16′09″W
- Country: United States
- State: Louisiana
- Parish: St. Mary

Area
  - Total: 1.95 sq mi (5.05 km^{2})
  - Land: 1.80 sq mi (4.67 km^{2})
  - Water: 0.15 sq mi (0.38 km^{2})
- Elevation: 7 ft (2.1 m)

Population (2020)
  - Total: 4,213
  - Density: 2,338.5/sq mi (902.91/km^{2})
- Time zone: UTC-6 (CST)
  - Summer (DST): UTC-5 (CDT)
- Area code: 985
- FIPS code: 22-05525

Bayou Vista is a census-designated place (CDP) in St. Mary Parish, Louisiana, United States. As of the 2020 census, Bayou Vista had a population of 4,213. It is part of the Morgan City Micropolitan Statistical Area.

== Geography ==
Bayou Vista is located at 29°41′26″N 91°16′9″W (29.690521, -91.269048).

According to the United States Census Bureau, the CDP has a total area of 1.9 square miles (5.0 km^{2}), of which 1.8 square miles (4.7 km^{2}) is land and 0.15 square miles (0.4 km^{2}), or 7.52%, is water.

== Demographics ==
Historical population
Census	Pop.	Note	%±
1970	5,121		—
1980	5,805		13.4%
1990	4,733		−18.5%
2000	4,351		−8.1%
2010	4,652		6.9%
2020	4,213		−9.4%
U.S. Decennial Census; 1950 1960 1970 1980; 1990 2000 2010

Bayou Vista first appeared as an unincorporated place in the 1970 U.S. census; and then as a census designated place the 1980 U.S. Census.

Bayou Vista racial composition as of 2020
Race	Number	Percentage
White (non-Hispanic)	3,171	75.27%
Black or African American (non-Hispanic)	333	7.9%
Native American	58	1.38%
Asian	20	0.47%
Pacific Islander	6	0.14%
Other/Mixed	196	4.65%
Hispanic or Latino	429	10.18%

As of the 2020 United States census, there were 4,213 people, 1,859 households, and 1,030 families residing in the CDP.
