= CINI-FM =

Radio station in Mistissini, Quebec

Coordinates: 50°25′12″N 73°51′33″W

- Mistissini, Quebec; Canada
- Frequency: 95.3 MHz

Programming
- Format: First Nations community radio

Ownership
- Owner: (CINI Radio FM)

History
- First air date: 1990

Technical information
- Class: B
- ERP: 50,000 watts horizontal polarization only
- HAAT: 112.5 metres (369 ft)

Links
- Website: www.cinifm.ca

CINI-FM is a First Nations community radio station that operates on 95.3 MHz in Mistissini, Quebec, Canada.

== Transmitters ==
Rebroadcasters of CINI-FM
City of licence	Identifier	Frequency	RECNet	CRTC Decision
Mistissini	CINI-FM-1	102.1 FM	Query	
