= WYKV =

K-Love radio station in Ravena, New York, United States

Coordinates: 42.556°N 73.868°W

- Ravena, New York; United States
- Broadcast area: Capital District
- Frequency: 94.5 MHz
- Branding: K-Love

Programming
- Format: Christian contemporary
- Network: K-Love

Ownership
- Owner: Educational Media Foundation

History
- First air date: November 1991
- Former call signs: WRAV (1991–93); WEMX (1993–96); WABY-FM (1996–99); WKLI (1999–2001); WRCZ (2001–06); WBOE (2006–07)
- Call sign meaning: "K-Love"

Technical information
- Licensing authority: FCC
- Facility ID: 73929
- Class: A
- ERP: 3,000 watts
- HAAT: 100 meters (330 ft)

Links
- Public license information: Public file; LMS
- Webcast: Listen live
- Website: www.klove.com

WYKV (94.5 MHz) is a listener-supported, non-commercial Christian contemporary radio station licensed to Ravena, New York, and serving the Capital District and upper Hudson Valley of New York. The station is owned by Educational Media Foundation and broadcasts at 3,000 watts ERP from a location in Selkirk, New York. It is an owned-and-operated station (O&O) of EMF's K-Love network.

== History ==
The 94.5 frequency signed on as WRAV in November 1991 with a Jones Radio Networks "Adult Choice" satellite-fed adult contemporary format which tried to target Albany's southern suburbs. WRAV struggled from the outset with no less than three rivals in Albany and, soon after signing on, a rival in Catskill as well. As a result, the station struggled financially and was sold in November 1993 after nearly going dark; the new owners switched programming services to the Satellite Music Network "Hot AC" format and relaunched the station as WEMX (Mix 94.5). Though WEMX was better off financially, it still struggled in terms of ratings and revenue.

In June 1995, WKLI and WABY owner Paul Bendat bought WEMX and that August (after five weeks of syndicated talk shows and hot adult contemporary music) changed the station's format to a simulcast of the adult standards format heard on WABY. Initially, the station had various prior commitments on weekends to clear and was forced to sign off overnights due to a programming service conflict between WABY and WCKL in Catskill. In May 1996, the station was granted a call letter change to WABY-FM. From the outset, the simulcast was wildly successful with ratings often being among the top five stations (12+) in the Albany market. WKLI had always supported the WABY stations and although revenue at WABY improved, a misconception of the value of its audience due to poor sales staff never allowed it to reach its potential. A decline at WKLI coupled with the lure of money led to Bendat's days being numbered.

In February 1999, Bendat sold his stations to Tele-Media, Inc., which, that spring, replaced adult standards with satellite-fed soft gold from the ABC/SMN "Memories" network outside drivetimes (and flipped the AM side to news programming by day in April 1999). The station converted back to all-local programming after a Christmas music stunt in late 1999, as well as a flip to soft adult contemporary, which came on December 26, 1999, with the reincarnation of the K-Lite format formerly on 100.9 FM, with the WKLI calls moving to 94.5. Given its signal impairments and fierce competition from WYJB, WKLI's ratings fell to levels not seen in years and revenue barely improved compared to the standards format, though the station had some success with Delilah in the evening hours.

Tele-Media left the Albany market in August 2001, with WKLI and WABY being sold to Syracuse, New York–based Galaxy Communications. The sale resulted in a format flip for WKLI to "Classic rock that Really Rocks", becoming WRCZ (94 Rock) (with former WPYX morning host Bob Mason in mornings) on October 31, 2001.

On January 4, 2006, WRCZ and WEGQ joined together in a format flip to mainstream rock as 93.7/94.5 The Bone. At this time, WRCZ became WBOE, and WEGQ became WOOB. The station became home to Nights with Alice Cooper and NASCAR NEXTEL Cup motorsports. J. R. Gach, a holdover from 94 Rock, was the morning personality until August 2006.

On February 16, 2007, the Bone format ended as the signal was cut off in the middle of "Ride the River" by Eric Clapton, as Galaxy exited the Albany market after both stations were sold to Educational Media Foundation in a fire sale. The station became an O&O of the K-Love network, and took on the WYKV call letters on July 6, 2007, after four months under EMF ownership.
