= WFBR-LP =

Radio station in Mount Washington, Kentucky

- Mount Washington, Kentucky; United States
- Frequency: 95.3 MHz

Ownership
- Owner: First Baptist Church of Mount Washington

History
- First air date: November 29, 2003
- Last air date: July 31, 2025
- Former frequencies: 93.9 MHz (2002–2014)

Technical information
- Licensing authority: FCC
- Facility ID: 135114
- Class: L1
- ERP: 100 watts
- HAAT: 28.4 meters (93 ft)
- Transmitter coordinates: 38°2′59.2″N 85°32′38.8″W

Links
- Public license information: LMS
- Website: www.reach95.org

WFBR-LP (95.3 FM) was a radio station licensed to broadcast in Mount Washington, Kentucky, United States. The station was owned by First Baptist Church of Mount Washington.

WFBR first went on the air on November 29, 2003. The primary coverage area for WFBR included most of Bullitt County, Kentucky (where it is based). It could also be tuned in throughout much of southern Jefferson County and western Spencer County. It has also been reported to be heard in Hardin and other surrounding counties in some areas. The station initially was on the air at 93.9 FM but was moved to 95.3 FM in late 2008 after a co-channel interference developed with a new nearby station. WFBR-LP was issued a license for the 95.3 FM frequency on April 2, 2014.

The station carried contemporary Christian music as the main programming lineup. The station also aired music from bands and artists local to their area. High school sports and other local events were also frequently covered on the station. Local announcements were frequently made throughout the day.

The station ceased operations on July 31, 2025. WFBR-LP requested the cancellation of its license on September 29, 2025.
