= Nunn, Colorado =

Town in Colorado, United States

- Town
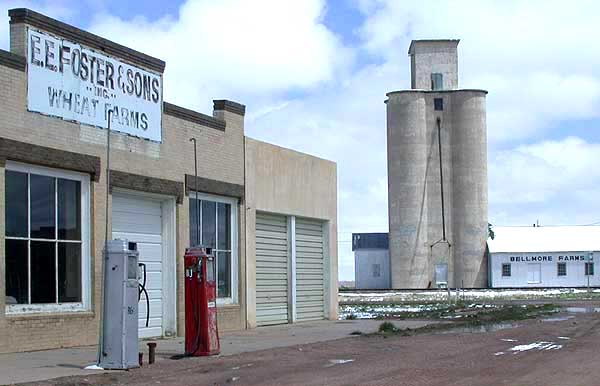
- Looking west from Logan Street towards U.S. 85 in Nunn, Colorado

- Location of Nunn in Weld County, Colorado.
- Coordinates: 40°42′49″N 104°47′20″W
- Country: United States
- State: Colorado
- County: Weld
- Incorporated (town): March 28, 1908

Government
  - Type: Statutory Town

Area
  - Total: 3.71 sq mi (9.60 km^{2})
  - Land: 3.71 sq mi (9.60 km^{2})
  - Water: 0 sq mi (0.00 km^{2}) 0.0%
- Elevation: 5,214 ft (1,589 m)

Population (2020)
  - Total: 504
  - Density: 136/sq mi (52.5/km^{2})
- Time zone: UTC-7 (MST)
  - Summer (DST): UTC-6 (MDT)
- ZIP code: 80648
- Area code: 970
- FIPS code: 08-55045
- GNIS feature ID: 2413059
- Website: townofnunn.colorado.gov

Nunn is a Statutory Town in Weld County, Colorado, United States. The population was 504 at the 2020 census.

== History ==
A post office called Nunn has been in operation since 1905. The town was named after William Silas Nunn, who was credited with preventing a nearby train wreck.

== Geography ==
According to the United States Census Bureau, the town has a total area of 1.8 square miles (4.7 km^{2}), all of it land.

== Demographics ==
Historical population
Census	Pop.	Note	%±
1910	143		—
1920	149		4.2%
1930	196		31.5%
1940	190		−3.1%
1950	182		−4.2%
1960	228		25.3%
1970	269		18.0%
1980	295		9.7%
1990	324		9.8%
2000	471		45.4%
2010	416		−11.7%
2020	504		21.2%

== Economy ==
Nunn is the home of Greenfaith Ministry, the nation's first cannabis sacrament church and charity.

About a third of the town's budget is generated by citations written by its police department.

== See also ==
- North Central Colorado Urban Area
- Denver-Aurora-Boulder, CO Combined Statistical Area
- Greeley, CO Metropolitan Statistical Area
