= WPKV =

K-Love radio station in Duquesne–Pittsburgh, Pennsylvania

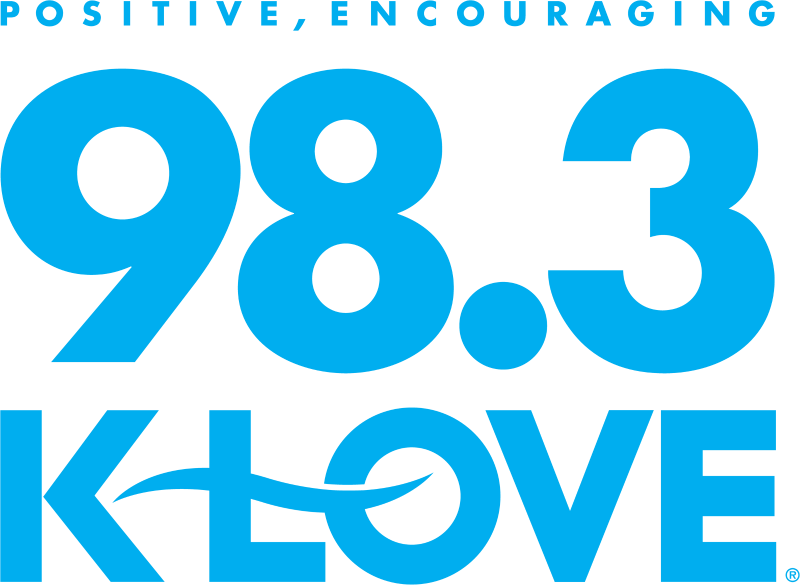

Duquesne, Pennsylvania; United States
- Broadcast area: Pittsburgh, Pennsylvania
- Frequency: 98.3 MHz (HD Radio)
- Branding: "98.3 K-Love"

Programming
- Format: Christian adult contemporary
- Subchannels: HD2: Air1 (Contemporary worship music); HD3: Boost Radio (Contemporary Christian)
- Affiliations: K-Love

Ownership
- Owner: Educational Media Foundation

History
- Call sign meaning: "Pittsburgh's K-Love"

Technical information
- Facility ID: 21214
- Class: B1
- ERP: 3,700 watts (analog); 148 watts (digital)
- HAAT: 246 meters (807 ft)
- Transmitter coordinates: 40°28′19.2″N 79°59′39.2″W
- Translator: See § Translators

Links
- Webcast: Listen Live
- Website: klove.com

WPKV (98.3 FM, "98.3 K-LOVE") is a non-commercial radio station that is licensed to serve Duquesne, Pennsylvania and is located in the Pittsburgh media market. The station is owned and operated by Educational Media Foundation and is an affiliate of K-LOVE, EMF's contemporary Christian music network.

== History ==
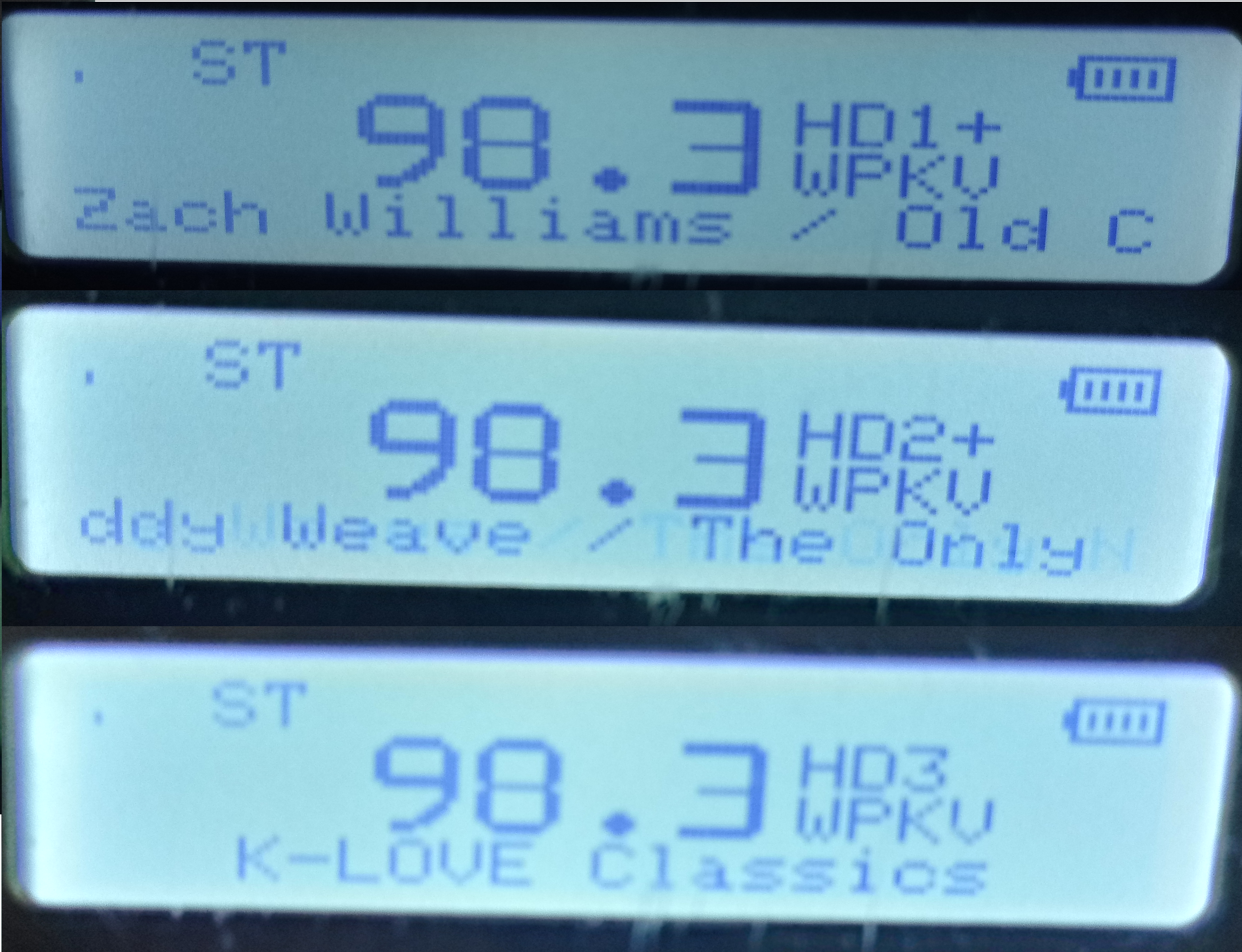
WPKV's HD Radio channels on a SPARC Radio with PSD.

=== As WESA-FM ===
WPKV was originally adult top 40 WESA-FM, the sister station of WESA, and was licensed to Charleroi, Pennsylvania; first going on the air in 1967, and under the ownership of Laubach Radio Properties.

Created out of necessity to serve the Mon-Yough area because its AM sister was only licensed to operate during sunrise to sunset hours, WESA-FM offered some separate programming during the day, but at night, picked up where WESA was forced to leave off. Both stations became a full-time simulcast once new FCC regulations were passed eliminating the rule mandating that combination AM/FM license holders originate separate programming for half of the broadcast day.

=== As WZKT "Z98" ===
In 1998, WESA-FM abandoned its call letters and adult contemporary full-service format, and flipped to top 40 as WZKT (Z98), but that format would go away in January 2000, after it was sold to Keymarket Communications.

Keymarket, which had owned and operated "Froggy" branded country music stations throughout Pennsylvania already for ten years, had been looking to gain a foothold in the Pittsburgh market. The opportunity presented itself for Keymarket to acquire WESA and WZKT, and both stations were sold for $1.3 million.

Keymarket, in March 2002, petitioned the FCC for permission to change the station's city of license to Duquesne, allowing them to realize the intended goal of targeting Pittsburgh proper. By the end of the decade, Keymarket had acquired other signals surrounding Pittsburgh enough to target the city from a multitude of different frequencies, and could focus the station on possibly another format.

=== WPKV today ===
On August 28, 2009, Keymarket announced that it sold WOGI to Educational Media Foundation, which announced plans to bring the K-LOVE Christian Contemporary music format to Pittsburgh as early as September 1, 2009. This format is on the air today and the call letters were subsequently changed to WPKV.

In late 2018, WPKV added HD Radio to air sister channels Air1 and the new K-Love Classics.

== Translators ==
WPKV programming is broadcast on the following translators:

Call sign	Frequency	City of license	FID	ERP (W)	HAAT	Class	Transmitter coordinates	FCC info	Notes
W204CT	88.7 FM	Pittsburgh, Pennsylvania	148415	130	203 m (666 ft)	D	40°28′19.2″N 79°59′39.2″W	LMS	Air1 (HD2)
W250CY	97.9 FM	Pittsburgh, Pennsylvania	20782	105	168 m (551 ft)	D	40°24′42.2″N 79°55′52.2″W	LMS	Boost Radio (HD3)

== See also ==
Other K-LOVE stations in Pennsylvania include:

- WJKB, Sheffield/Warren
- WKBP, Benton/Bloomsburg
- WKHL, Palmyra/Harrisburg
- WKHW, Halifax
- WKPA, Port Matilda/State College
- WKVP, Camden/Philadelphia
- WKWP, Williamsport
- WLKA, Tafton/Scranton
- WLKE, Gallitzin/Altoona
- WLKH, Somerset
- WLKJ, Portage/Johnstown
- WUKL, Masontown
- W223BY, Connellsville/Uniontown
- W296CD, Jonestown
