= WMNY (disambiguation) =

WMNY is a radio station (1150 AM) licensed to New Kensington, Pennsylvania.

WMNY may also refer to:

- WGBN, a radio station (1360 AM) licensed to McKeesport, Pennsylvania, which held the call sign WMNY from 2008 to 2014
- WBBF, a radio station (1120 AM) licensed to Buffalo, New York, which held the call sign WMNY from 1999 to 2005
- WORG, a radio station (100.3 FM) licensed to Elloree, South Carolina, which held the call sign WMNY from 1989 to 1991
