= KDKL =

KDKL may refer to:

- KDKL (FM), a radio station (103.7 FM) licensed to serve Okemah, Oklahoma, United States
- KAWK (FM), a radio station (88.3 FM) licensed to serve Coalinga, California, United States, which held the call sign KDKL from 2003 to 2023
