= KKLM =

KKLM may refer to:

- KKLM (FM), a radio station (104.1 FM) licensed to serve Murrieta, California, United States, which holds the call sign from 2018 to present.
- KNVE (FM), a radio station (91.3 FM) licensed to serve Redding, California, United States, which held the call sign KKLM from 2017 to 2018
- KPLV (FM), a radio station (88.7 FM) licensed to serve Corpus Christi, Texas, United States, which held the call sign KKLM from 2002 to 2017
