= WKPA =

WKPA may refer to:

- WKPA (FM), a radio station (107.9 FM) licensed to serve Port Matilda, Pennsylvania, United States
- WPLY (610 AM), a radio station (1390 AM) licensed to serve Lynchburg, Virginia, United States, which held the call sign WKPA from 1993 to 2019
- WMNY, a radio station (1150 AM) licensed to serve New Kensington, Pennsylvania, which held the call sign WKPA from 1940 to 1993
