= WKPA (FM) =

K-Love radio station in Port Matilda, Pennsylvania

- Port Matilda, Pennsylvania; United States
- Broadcast area: State College
- Frequency: 107.9 MHz
- Branding: K-Love

Programming
- Format: Contemporary Christian
- Network: K-Love

Ownership
- Owner: Educational Media Foundation
- Sister stations: WNLI

History
- First air date: October 17, 1994
- Former call signs: WXXZ (1992–1994); WIKN (1994–1999); WNCL (1999–2002); WJHT (2002–2005); WKVB (2005–2020)
- Call sign meaning: "K-Love Pennsylvania"

Technical information
- Licensing authority: FCC
- Facility ID: 63546
- Class: A
- ERP: 450 watts
- HAAT: 358 meters (1,175 ft)
- Transmitter coordinates: 40°55′11.00″N 77°58′28.00″W

Links
- Public license information: Public file; LMS
- Webcast: Listen Live
- Website: www.klove.com

WKPA (107.9 FM) is a non-commercial radio station broadcasting Contemporary Christian music programming from the K-Love radio network. Licensed to serve Port Matilda, Pennsylvania, the station services the State College area. The station is owned by the Educational Media Foundation (EMF).

== History ==
On October 17, 1994, WXXZ Port Matilda came on air quickly changing call sign to WIKN. Wink 108 programmed a rock-leaning CHR format. Due to a dispute between the license holder and the management group running the station, it went dark April 1, 1995.

The station was sold to Tele-Media and became a sister station to 97.1 WQWK and 1390 WRSC. The station then came back on the air in the summer of 1995, again as Wink 108, but with a Hot AC format. In 1999, 107.9's tower was later moved north, power increased to 6,000 watts, and call sign changed to WNCL, at which time the station became "Cool 107nine, All Oldies, All the Time" and later "Good Time Oldies, Cool 107nine" playing an oldies format focusing mostly on top 40 music of the 1960s. DJs on this station included Dave Shannon in the morning, "Little" Liane Margaret, Tom Howard, "Jesuit" Jay Stevens, and "Sultry" Sammi Craig, the nicknames having been bestowed by Shannon.

The call sign was later changed to WJHT (Hot 107.9) with a rhythmic CHR format that included several popular DJs like Mayor Mike Jax, The Rob and DJ Grooves. Mayor Mike Jax now does afternoons for WAMO 100 in Pittsburgh, PA. DJ Grooves was most recently the music director at Wired 96.5 in Philadelphia and 98.7 Amp Radio in Detroit. He also produces a popular mixshow that is syndicated on many stations throughout the United States. The Rob is now the morning talent at 106.1 Kiss FM in Evansville, IN. All three still stay in touch and return to State College on occasion.

The frequency was sold in 2004 and became the Christian contemporary radio format of today.

The call sign was changed from WKVB to WKPA on March 6, 2020; this was concurrent with EMF transferring the WKVB call sign to their newly-acquired station in Worcester-Boston, Massachusetts.

== See also ==
Other K-LOVE stations in Pennsylvania include:

- WKVP, Camden, NJ/Philadelphia, PA
- WLKA, Scranton, PA
- WLKJ, Johnstown, PA
- WPKV, Pittsburgh, PA
- W269AS, Harrisburg, PA
- WKHL, Palmyra/Harrisburg, PA
- WKYJ, Starview/York, PA
- WGET, Gettysburg, PA
- WKHW, Halifax, PA
- WLKE, Altoona, PA
- WLOQ, Oil City, PA
- WVLY, Milton/Sunbury, PA
- W223BY, Masontown, PA
- WFSH, Warren, PA
- WKWP, Williamsport, PA
