= KPLV =

KPLV may refer to:

- KPLV (FM), a radio station (88.7 FM) licensed to serve Corpus Christi, Texas, United States
- KNVE (FM), a radio station (91.3 FM) licensed to serve Redding, California, United States, which held the call sign KPLV in 2017
- KARQ (FM), a radio station (88.5 FM) licensed to serve San Luis Obispo, California, which held the call sign KPLV from 2016 to 2017
- KLPT (FM), a radio station (90.9 FM) licensed to serve Prescott, Arizona, United States, which held the call sign KPLV in 2016
- KVGK, a radio station (93.1 FM) licensed to serve Las Vegas, Nevada, United States, which held the call sign KPLV from 2006 to 2016
- KTHK, a radio station (105.5 FM) licensed to serve Idaho Falls, Idaho, United States, which held the call sign KPLV from 2001 to 2004
- KNAL (FM), a radio station (93.3 FM) licensed to serve Port Lavaca, Texas, which held the call sign KPLV from 1987 to 2001
