= WYPA =

Air 1 radio station in Cherry Hill, New Jersey

- Cherry Hill, New Jersey; United States
- Broadcast area: Philadelphia/Cherry Hill
- Frequency: 89.5 MHz (HD Radio)
- Branding: Air1

Programming
- Format: Christian worship
- Subchannels: HD2: Simulcast of WWFM (classical); HD3: Radio Nueva Vida
- Affiliations: Air1

Ownership
- Owner: Educational Media Foundation
- Sister stations: WKVP

History
- First air date: 1986 (as WEEE)
- Former call signs: WEEE (1986–1995); WSJI (1995–2007); WKVP (2007–2013)

Technical information
- Licensing authority: FCC
- Facility ID: 7045
- Class: A
- ERP: 1,900 watts (analog); 75 watts (digital)
- HAAT: 61 meters (200 ft)
- Transmitter coordinates: 39°54′43.4″N 74°59′19.6″W

Links
- Public license information: Public file; LMS
- Website: www.air1.com

WYPA (89.5 FM) is a non–commercial Christian worship formatted radio station licensed to serve Cherry Hill, New Jersey. The station is owned by Educational Media Foundation and is a member of the nationally syndicated Air1 radio network.

WYPA uses HD Radio, and simulcasts the classical programming of WWFM on its HD2 subchannel.

== History ==
The station signed on for the first time in 1986 as WEEE, "The Cherry Hill Station" which featured an easy listening format and broadcast Cherry Hill related announcements, town meetings and local sports. In 1995, the station changed its call sign to WSJI and featured contemporary Christian music and preaching.

Formerly owned by Thomas Moffit Sr.'s Broadcast Learning Center, the station was sold to California–based EMF Broadcasting's "K-Love" radio network for $2.5 million; $600,000 cash at closing (including $122,500 escrow deposit) plus $1.85 million promissory note. The sale was brokered by John Pierce and Co. LLC and represented the Educational Media Foundation's entry into the Greater Philadelphia Metropolitan radio market. The sale, which began in August 2006, was finalized on January 10, 2007, and the station switched to K–Love's network feed at 5 p.m. the same day. The station's new call sign was WKVP, ostensibly "K-Love Philadelphia".

On November 5, 2013, the station changed its call sign to WYPA. The WKVP call sign moved to EMF's station in Camden, New Jersey, the former WWIQ (and for 43 years, Family Radio's WKDN).
