= List of K-Love stations =

The following is a list of full-power radio stations, HD Radio subchannels and low-power translators in the United States broadcasting K-Love programming, which can be sorted by their call signs, frequencies, city of license, state and broadcast area.

Blue background indicates a low-power FM translator.
Gray background indicates an HD Radio subchannel.

List of K-Love stations
Call sign	Frequency	City of license	State	Broadcast area
W212AP	90.3	Notasulga	AL	Auburn
W241AI	96.1	Gorgas	AL	Birmingham
WMJJ-HD3	96.5-3	Birmingham	AL	Birmingham
WLBJ	93.5	Butler	AL	Butler
KRLE	89.7	Carbon Hill	AL	Carbon Hill
WLGQ	91.5	Gadsden	AL	Gadsden
WKVV	97.3	Gardendale	AL	Birmingham
W225AH	92.9	Huntsville	AL	Huntsville
WHVK	103.5	New Hope	AL	Huntsville
WLVM	98.3	Chickasaw	AL	Mobile
WMRK-FM	107.9	Shorter	AL	Montgomery
WLXQ	99.1	Greensboro	AL	Tuscaloosa
KAKL	88.5	Anchorage	AK	Anchorage
K253CA	98.5	Eagle River	AK	Eagle River
KKLF	88.3	Fairbanks	AK	Fairbanks
KLSF	89.7	Juneau	AK	Juneau
K201EG	88.1	Ketchikan	AK	Ketchikan
K210CF	89.9	Kodiak	AK	Kodiak
K257GG	99.3	Wasilla	AK	Wasilla
KVPP	88.9	Pago Pago	AS	Pago Pago
KLKI	89.9	Bullhead City	AZ	Bullhead City
KKMR	106.5	Arizona City	AZ	Casa Grande
K214DT	90.7	Flagstaff	AZ	Flagstaff
KLKA	88.5	Globe	AZ	Globe
KLVK	89.1	Fountain Hills	AZ	Phoenix
KLVA	89.9	Superior	AZ	Phoenix
KLPT	90.9	Prescott	AZ	Prescott
KLTQ	90.9	Thatcher	AZ	Safford
KLTU	88.1	Mammoth	AZ	Tucson
K216GP	91.1	Wickenburg	AZ	Wickenburg
K220KF	92.1	Wickenburg	AZ	Wickenburg
K229CF	93.7	Batesville	AR	Batesville
K222DN	92.3	Booneville, etc.	AR	Booneville
KAKV	88.9	El Dorado	AR	El Dorado
KLFH	90.7	Fort Smith	AR	Fort Smith
KLFS	90.3	Van Buren	AR	Fort Smith
KHLR	91.9	Harrison	AR	Harrison
KLRO	90.1	Hot Springs	AR	Hot Springs
K250BH	97.9	Jonesboro	AR	Jonesboro
KIYS-HD3	101.7-3	Walnut Ridge	AR	Jonesboro
KLFJ	105.3	Hoxie	AR	Jonesboro
KWLR	96.9	Maumelle	AR	Little Rock
KLMK	90.7	Marvell	AR	Marvell
K235DB	94.9	Mena	AR	Mena
KLRM	90.7	Melbourne	AR	Mountain Home
K226AG	93.1	Pine Bluff	AR	Pine Bluff
KLUY	88.7	Searcy	AR	Searcy
KKLT	89.3	Texarkana	AR	Texarkana
K255CN	98.9	Auburn	CA	Auburn
KBLV	88.7	Tehachapi	CA	Bakersfield
K205BM	88.9	Oakland	CA	Berkeley
KWLU	98.9	Chester	CA	Chester
KLVC	88.3	Magalia	CA	Chico
KAWK	88.3	Coalinga	CA	Coalinga
K208GB	89.5	Crescent City	CA	Crescent City
K240DX	95.9	Eureka	CA	Eureka
KLKE	103.7	Garberville	CA	Eureka
K220JB	91.9	Leisure Town	CA	Fairfield
K224DK	92.7	Fontana	CA	Fontana
KLVY	91.1	Fairmead	CA	Fresno
K206BQ	89.1	Hollister	CA	Gilroy
KKLP	91.1	Perris	CA	Hemet
K238AH	95.5	King City	CA	King City
K236AW	95.1	Lancaster	CA	Lancaster
KHKL	91.9	Laytonville	CA	Laytonville
KKLQ	100.3	Los Angeles	CA	Los Angeles
KLVN	88.3	Livingston	CA	Modesto
KLXF	90.5	Modesto	CA	Modesto
KLVQ	96.3	Mount Shasta	CA	Mount Shasta
K253AX	98.5	Susanville	CA	Mount Shasta
K225AU	92.9	Nevada City	CA	Nevada City
KMVS	89.3	Moss Beach	CA	Pacifica
KLXB	105.1	Bermuda Dunes	CA	Palm Springs
K221DQ	92.1	Petaluma	CA	Petaluma
KKLC	107.9	Fall River Mills	CA	Redding
K270AA	101.9	Redding	CA	Redding
KLXP	89.7	Randsburg	CA	Ridgecrest
KLVB	103.9	Lincoln	CA	Sacramento
KLRS	89.7	Lodi	CA	Sacramento–Stockton
KLVM	88.9	Santa Cruz	CA	Salinas–Monterey
KLVJ	102.1	Encinitas	CA	San Diego
KLVS	107.3	Livermore	CA	San Francisco
KJLV	95.3	Los Gatos	CA	San Jose
KSLY	96.1	Inyokern	CA	San Luis Obispo
KLSB	97.5	Goleta	CA	Santa Barbara
KLVR	91.9	Middletown	CA	Santa Rosa
K290CJ	105.9	Soledad	CA	Soledad
K264BP	100.7	West Sonora	CA	Sonora
K275BT	102.9	Stockton	CA	Stockton
K253AA	98.5	Susanville	CA	Susanville
KKLM	104.1	Murrieta	CA	Temecula
KYKL	90.7	Tracy	CA	Tracy
KULV	97.1	Ukiah	CA	Ukiah
K276EK	103.1	Vacaville	CA	Vacaville
KLXD	89.5	Victorville	CA	Victorville
KLXY	90.5	Woodlake	CA	Visalia
K240EJ	95.9	Yreka	CA	Yreka
K296EX	107.1	Yuba City	CA	Yuba City-Marysville
K210BO	89.9	Aspen	CO	Aspen
KBIQ	102.7	Colorado Springs	CO	Colorado Springs
KBKV	88.7	Breckenridge	CO	Breckenridge
K300AE	107.9	Breckenridge	CO	Breckenridge
K213AT	90.5	Buena Vista	CO	Buena Vista
K267AZ	101.3	Cedaredge	CO	Cedaredge
KWRY	106.9	Pueblo	CO	Colorado Springs
K215BS	90.9	Craig	CO	Craig
KLDV	91.1	Morrison	CO	Denver
K212GJ	90.3	Dillon	CO	Dillon
KLCQ	88.5	Durango	CO	Durango
K204GT	88.7	Estes Park	CO	Estes Park
KLXV	91.9	Glenwood Springs	CO	Glenwood Springs
K209FA	89.7	Glenwood Springs	CO	Glenwood Springs
KLFV	90.3	Grand Junction	CO	Grand Junction
K220AH	91.9	Gunnison	CO	Gunnison
KLRY	91.3	Gypsum	CO	Gypsum
KLHQ	99.5	Hotchkiss	CO	Hotchkiss
K206AZ	89.1	Leadville	CO	Leadville
K269EQ	101.7	Loveland	CO	Loveland
K219AW	91.7	Meeker	CO	Meeker
K210CE	89.9	Mesa	CO	Mesa
K223BR	92.5	Montrose	CO	Montrose
K213BX	90.5	Nucla	CO	Nucla
K218BP	91.5	Parachute	CO	Parachute
K220BM	91.9	Rangely	CO	Rangely
KLBV	89.3	Steamboat Springs	CO	Steamboat Springs
KLZV	91.3	Brush	CO	Sterling
K257FD	99.3	Sterling	CO	Sterling
KLMQ	90.7	Placerville	CO	Telluride
K212FY	90.3	Vail	CO	Vail
WCCC	106.9	Hartford	CT	Hartford CT- Springfield MA
W277AH	103.3	Dover	DE	Dover
WLVW	107.3	Washington	DC	Washington
WDLV	88.7	Fort Myers	FL	Fort Myers
WJKV	90.9	Jacksonville	FL	Jacksonville
WKWR	89.9	Key West	FL	Key West
WMLV	89.7	Miami	FL	Miami
WPFM	107.9	Panama City	FL	Panama City
WPLV	95.7	Navarre	FL	Pensacola
WLSF	88.3	Starke	FL	Starke
WKVH	91.9	Monticello	FL	Tallahassee
W279CU	103.7	Tallahassee	FL	Tallahassee
WKVZ	98.7	Holmes Beach	FL	Tampa Bay
W214BD	90.7	Gifford–Vero Beach	FL	Vero Beach
WFLV	90.7	West Palm Beach	FL	West Palm Beach
WHKV	106.1	Sylvester	GA	Albany
WKMW	88.7	Americus	GA	Americus
WAKL	106.7	Gainesville	GA	Atlanta
WEKL	102.3	Augusta	GA	Augusta
W290AS	105.9	Bainbridge	GA	Bainbridge
WLGA	90.5	Columbus	GA	Columbus
WLVG	105.1	Clermont	GA	Gainesville
WGLH	103.9	Hawkinsville	GA	Hawkinsville
WLXF	105.5	Macon	GA	Macon
WUKV	95.7	Trion	GA	Rome
WKZV	102.1	Tybee Island	GA	Savannah
WVKV	95.3	Nashville	GA	Valdosta–Tifton
W220EP	90.3	Warner Robins	GA	Warner Robins
WGLU	102.5	Warner Robins	GA	Warner Robins
K204GM	88.7	Hilo	HI	Hilo
KLUU	103.5	Wahiawa	HI	Honolulu
K233DC	94.5	Kailua	HI	Kailua–Kona
KKHI	95.9	Kaunakakai	HI	Lahaina, Hawaii
KMKV	100.7	Kihei	HI	Maui, Hawaii
KLXI	99.5	Fruitland	ID	Boise
K279CV	103.7	Burley	ID	Burley
K218EZ	91.5	Pocatello	ID	Pocatello
KLRI	89.5	Rigby	ID	Pocatello–Idaho Falls
K221FT	92.1	Twin Falls	ID	Twin Falls
KXTA-HD4	99.1-4	Gooding	ID	Twin Falls
WCKL	97.9	Chicago	IL	Chicago
WCLR	92.5	DeKalb	IL	Chicago and western suburbs
W256CA	99.1	Joliet	IL	Joliet
WOKL	89.1	Round Lake Beach	IL	North Chicago
WLKU	98.9	Rock Island	IL	Quad Cities
WILV	91.1	Rockford	IL	Rockford
WZKL	91.7	Woodstock	IL	Woodstock
W224CL	92.7	Anderson	IN	Anderson
W247AY	97.3	Bedford	IN	Bedford
WBKC	90.9	Morgantown	IN	Bloomington
W271BG	102.1	Columbus	IN	Columbus
W288CM	105.5	Connersville	IN	Connersville
WIKL	101.7	Elwood	IN	Elwood
WKVN	95.3	Morganfield	IN	Evansville
WYNG	94.9	Mount Carmel	IN	Evansville
WKLU	101.9	Brownsburg	IN	Indianapolis
WLXJ	88.9	Battle Ground	IN	Lafayette
WKMV	88.3	Muncie	IN	Muncie
WIKV	89.3	Plymouth	IN	Plymouth
WKRT	89.3	Richmond	IN	Richmond
WJLR	91.5	Seymour	IN	Seymour
WQKV	88.7	Warsaw	IN	Warsaw
K250BC	97.9	Ames	IA	Ames
K299AU	107.7	Burlington	IA	Burlington
K281BS	104.1	Hiawatha	IA	Cedar Rapids
K237GC	95.3	Des Moines	IA	Des Moines
KKDM-HD3	107.5-3	Des Moines	IA	Des Moines
K279BX	103.7	Des Moines	IA	Des Moines
K213DV	90.5	Pleasant Hill	IA	Des Moines
KLFG	89.5	Fort Dodge	IA	Fort Dodge
KQKL	95.3	Keokuk	IA	Keokuk
KKLG	88.3	Newton	IA	Newton
K212GH	90.3	Ottumwa	IA	Ottumwa
KILV	107.5	Castana	IA	Sioux City
K261DY	100.1	Sioux City	IA	Sioux City
K249DT	97.7	Atchison	KS	Atchison
KEKL	90.7	Emporia	KS	Emporia
KRTY	91.9	Great Bend	KS	Great Bend
K230BP	93.9	Hutchinson	KS	Hutchinson
KGLV	88.9	Manhattan	KS	Manhattan–Topeka
K217CY	91.3	Oberlin	KS	Oberlin
KSKG-HD3	99.9-3	Salina	KS	Salina
K245BN	96.9	Salina	KS	Salina
KTLI	99.1	El Dorado	KS	Wichita
WEBF	89.9	Lerose	KY	Beattyville
WXKY	96.3	Stanford	KY	Danville
WKYF	92.1	Fredonia	KY	Fredonia
WKVO	89.9	Georgetown	KY	Lexington
WVRB	95.3	Wilmore	KY	Lexington
WWLT	103.1	Manchester	KY	London
W285DT	104.9	London	KY	London
WHKQ	92.3	Louisa	KY	Louisa
WLEZ	99.3	Lebanon Junction	KY	Louisville
W250BD	97.9	Louisville	KY	Louisville
WSDF-HD2	100.5-2	Louisville	KY	Louisville
W236AN	95.1	Floyds Knobs	KY	Louisville
W227AX	93.3	Morehead	KY	Morehead
WEKV	101.9	Central City	KY	Owensboro–Evansville
WKYP	90.1	Ledbetter	KY	Paducah
WKVY	88.1	Somerset	KY	Somerset
KLXA	89.9	Alexandria	LA	Alexandria-Pineville
WBKL	92.7	Clinton	LA	Baton Rouge
K292GE	106.3	Bunkie	LA	Bunkie
KLXH	106.3	Thibodaux	LA	Houma-Thibodaux
KIKL	90.9	Lafayette	LA	Lafayette
KRLR	89.1	Sulphur	LA	Lake Charles
KLXN	104.1	Rosepine	LA	Leesville–DeRidder
KLXE	93.5	Calhoun	LA	Monroe-West Monroe
K284DE	104.7	Monroe	LA	Monroe
KLNQ	106.5	Atlanta	LA	Natchitoches
KNOL	107.5	Jean Lafitte	LA	New Orleans
KLHV	88.5	Cotton Valley	LA	Shreveport-Bossier City
WSVV	101.7	Searsport	ME	Bangor
WZVV	102.1	Dexter	ME	Bangor
WMSJ	89.3	Freeport	ME	Portland
WPKC-FM	92.1	Sanford	ME	Sanford
WLVX	100.7	Westminster	MD	Baltimore
WLVV	88.3	Midland	MD	Cumberland
WLBW	92.1	Fenwick Island	MD	Ocean City
WLDW	105.5	Salisbury	MD	Salisbury
WKMY	99.9	Athol	MA	Athol
WKCC	107.5	Chatham	MA	Chatham
WKVB	107.3	Westborough	MA	Boston–Worcester
WNKC	104.9	Gloucester	MA	Gloucester–North Shore
W260AS	99.9	Lawrence	MA	Lawrence
WTKL	91.1	North Dartmouth	MA	New Bedford
WDKL	102.7	Mount Clemens	MI	Detroit
W261BH	100.1	Flint	MI	Flint
WLFN	88.9	Flint	MI	Flint
W252CP	98.3	Holly	MI	Holly
W298BW	107.5	Iron Mountain	MI	Iron Mountain
WKIW	88.3	Ironwood	MI	Ironwood
W292DA	106.3	Linden	MI	Linden
WCRR	88.9	Manistique	MI	Manistique
WSHN	89.3	Munising	MI	Marquette
WLKB	89.1	Bay City	MI	Saginaw
WAWM	98.9	Petoskey	MI	Traverse City
K249ED	97.7	Albertville	MN	Minneapolis
K260BA	99.9	Coon Rapids	MN	Minneapolis
K257EP	99.3	Dilworth	MN	Fargo
KTCZ-HD2	97.1-2	Minneapolis	MN	Minneapolis–St. Paul
KFXN-HD3	100.3-3	Minneapolis	MN	Minneapolis–St. Paul
KMKL	90.3	North Branch	MN	North Branch
KKLW	90.9	Willmar	MN	Willmar
KRLP	88.1	Windom	MN	Windom
WBKM	96.7	Bogue Chitto	MS	McComb
WLXD	104.5	State College	MS	Columbus–Starkville–West Point
WLRK	91.5	Greenville	MS	Greenville
WLRJ	104.7	Greenville	MS	Greenville
WLVN	101.3	Grenada	MS	Grenada
WLGF	107.1	Gulfport	MS	Gulfport
WLVZ	103.7	Collins	MS	Hattiesburg
WAIH	96.5	Holly Springs	MS	Holly Springs
WJLV	94.7	Jackson	MS	Jackson
WLXW	89.7	Waynesboro	MS	Laurel
WFHM-FM	93.5	Butler	MS	Meridian
W233AS	94.5	Marion	MS	Meridian
W220BN	91.9	Natchez	MS	Natchez-Vidalia
WKFF	102.1	Sardis	MS	Oxford
W214BL	90.7	Oxford	MS	Oxford
KLRQ	96.1	Clinton	MO	Clinton
KMFC	92.1	Centralia	MO	Columbia
K295CI	106.5	Columbia	MO	Columbia
KOBC	90.7	Joplin	MO	Joplin
KLRX	97.3	Lee's Summit	MO	Kansas City
K253BG	98.5	St. Joseph	MO	St. Joseph
KBMV-FM	107.1	Birch Tree	MO	West Plains
KLRV	90.9	Billings	MT	Billings
KLBZ	89.3	Bozeman	MT	Bozeman
KQLR	89.7	Whitehall	MT	Butte
KLSK	100.3	Great Falls	MT	Great Falls
KHLV	90.1	Helena	MT	Helena
K255CH	98.9	Kalispell	MT	Kalispell
KLKM	88.7	Kalispell	MT	Kalispell
K224DV	92.7	Kalispell	MT	Kalispell
K229BU	93.7	Missoula	MT	Missoula
KKVU-HD2	104.5-2	Missoula	MT	Missoula
KLNB	88.3	Grand Island	NE	Grand Island
K212GI	90.3	Hastings	NE	Hastings
KFLV	89.9	Wilber	NE	Lincoln
K220GT	91.9	Lincoln	NE	Lincoln
KVLD	91.7	Norfolk	NE	Norfolk
KMLV	88.1	Ralston	NE	Omaha
KLJV	88.3	Scottsbluff	NE	Scottsbluff
K226AL	93.1	Carson City	NV	Carson City
K236AP	95.1	Fallon	NV	Fallon
K236BM	95.1	Spring Valley	NV	Las Vegas
KVID	88.5	Mesquite	NV	Las Vegas
KVKL	91.1	Las Vegas	NV	Las Vegas
KLRH	92.9	Reno	NV	Reno
W298CU	107.5	Chester	NH	Chester
WAKC	102.3	Concord	NH	Concord
W299AM	107.7	Lebanon	NH	Lebanon
WYKC	99.1	Whitefield	NH	Littleton
WLKC	105.7	Campton	NH	Plymouth
WPKC	1540	Exeter	NH	Portsmouth
W246BP	97.1	Exeter	NH	Portsmouth
WKVP	106.9	Camden	NJ	Philadelphia
WLRB	102.7	Ocean City	NJ	Atlantic City
WEZW	93.1	Wildwood Crest	NJ	Cape May
KLAG	91.7	Alamogordo	NM	Alamogordo
KQLV	90.7	Santa Fe	NM	Albuquerque
KLXC	90.3	Carlsbad	NM	Carlsbad
KELU	90.3	Grants	NM	Clovis
KLLU	88.9	Gallup	NM	Gallup
KLHK	88.3	Hobbs	NM	Hobbs
K228FI	93.5	Las Cruces	NM	Las Cruces
K212EF	90.3	Las Vegas	NM	Las Vegas
KVLK	89.5	Milan	NM	Milan
KRLU	90.1	Roswell	NM	Roswell
KLXZ	91.3	Ruidoso	NM	Ruidoso
KLCF	91.1	Truth or Consequences	NM	Truth or Consequences
KVLP	91.7	Tucumcari	NM	Tucumcari
WYKV	94.5	Ravena	NY	Albany
W281AK	104.1	Amsterdam	NY	Amsterdam
WBKV	102.5	Buffalo	NY	Buffalo
WQLR	94.7	Chateaugay	NY	Cornwall, Ontario–Montreal, Quebec, Canada
W235BB	94.9	Hauppauge	NY	Hauppauge–Long Island
WLKW	95.3	Celoron	NY	Jamestown
WLGV	90.9	Gloversville	NY	Johnstown
WPLF	103.3	Shelter Island	NY	Long Island — East
WPLJ	95.5	New York	NY	New York
WKVJ	89.7	Dannemora	NY	Plattsburgh
WGKV	101.7	Pulaski	NY	Pulaski
WKDL	104.9	Brockport	NY	Rochester
WKEL	88.1	Webster	NY	Rochester
WJKE	101.3	Stillwater	NY	Saratoga Springs
W283BA	104.5	Selden	NY	Selden–Long Island
WKLZ	105.9	Syracuse	NY	Syracuse
WKVU	107.3	Utica	NY	Utica
WKWV	90.1	Watertown	NY	Watertown
WRCM	91.9	Wingate	NC	Charlotte
WKVK	106.7	Semora	NC	Durham
WKFV	107.3	Clinton	NC	Fayetteville
WWLV	94.1	Lexington	NC	Greensboro–High Point–Winston-Salem
WLXB	98.9	Bethel	NC	Greenville
WKHC	97.1	Hatteras	NC	Hatteras
W289DX	105.7	Henderson	NC	Henderson
WKGV	104.1	Swansboro	NC	Jacksonville
WFVL	102.3	Lumberton	NC	Lumberton
WBNK	92.7	Pine Knoll Shores	NC	New Bern
WLXZ	90.3	Pinehurst	NC	Pinehurst
WRKV	88.9	Raleigh	NC	Raleigh
WNCB-HD2	93.9-2	Cary	NC	Raleigh
W232CH	94.3	Raleigh	NC	Raleigh
W271BT	102.1	Rocky Mount	NC	Rocky Mount
W270AW	103.9	Sanford	NC	Sanford
W288BQ	105.5	Wake Forest	NC	Wake Forest
W238AV	95.5	Wilmington	NC	Wilmington
W263BA	100.5	Wilmington	NC	Wilmington
W202CD	88.3	Wilson	NC	Wilson
W288BP	105.5	Wilson	NC	Wilson
KBMK	88.3	Bismarck	ND	Bismarck
KLDQ	100.7	Harwood	ND	Fargo
K237ER	95.3	Grand Forks	ND	Grand Forks
KJKL	89.1	Jamestown	ND	Jamestown
KNDL	100.7	Berthold	ND	Minot
KNDW	91.7	Williston	ND	Williston
WOHK	96.1	Ashtabula	OH	Ashtabula
W231CQ	94.1	Athens	OH	Athens
W231BY	94.1	Bellefontaine	OH	Bellefontaine
W290BA	105.9	Bowling Green	OH	Bowling Green
WNPQ	104.3	New Philadelphia	OH	Canton
WNLT	104.3	Delhi Hills	OH	Cincinnati
WKLV-FM	95.5	Cleveland	OH	Cleveland
WKVR	102.5	Baltimore	OH	Columbus
WKCD	90.3	Cedarville	OH	Dayton
W219DS	91.7	Findlay	OH	Findlay
W279BR	103.7	Greenville	OH	Greenville
W212BM	90.3	Jackson	OH	Jackson
WVLO	99.3	Cridersville	OH	Lima
WYKL	98.7	Crestline	OH	Mansfield
W257AB	99.3	Marion	OH	Marion
WPYK	104.1	New Boston	OH	Portsmouth
W231AZ	94.1	Sidney	OH	Sidney
W281AL	104.1	Harbor View	OH	Toledo
WNKL	96.9	Wauseon	OH	Toledo
W279BB	103.7	Urbana	OH	Urbana
W224BO	92.7	West Union	OH	West Union
WKLN	102.3	Wilmington	OH	Wilmington
WLRF	107.1	Greenville	OH	Youngstown
WYLR	101.9	Hubbard	OH	Youngstown
K212FZ	90.3	Ada	OK	Ada
KKVO	90.9	Altus	OK	Altus
K205FI	88.9	Ardmore	OK	Ardmore
KKLB	89.1	Bartlesville	OK	Bartlesville
K255BE	98.9	Tulsa	OK	Tulsa
K293AP	106.5	Sand Springs	OK	Tulsa
K265DT	100.9	Chickasha	OK	Chickasha
K276FR	103.1	Duncan	OK	Duncan
K288FX	105.5	North Enid	OK	Enid
KWKL	89.9	Grandfield	OK	Lawton
KTKL	88.5	Stigler	OK	McAlester
KYLV	88.9	Oklahoma City	OK	Oklahoma City
K292FJ	106.3	Stillwater	OK	Stillwater
K240ED	95.9	Tulsa	OK	Tulsa
KDKL	103.7	Okemah	OK	Tulsa
KLOY	88.7	Ocean Park	OR	Astoria
KVLB	90.5	Bend	OR	Bend
K223CS	92.5	Cave Junction	OR	Cave Junction
K219CK	91.7	Coos Bay	OR	Coos Bay
K265DF	100.9	Eugene	OR	Eugene
K297AJ	107.3	Coburg	OR	Eugene
KLXG	91.1	Grants Pass	OR	Grants Pass
K216EB	91.1	Hood River	OR	Hood River
KLKF	100.7	Malin	OR	Klamath Falls
K205DV	88.9	La Grande	OR	La Grande
KVLQ	90.1	La Pine	OR	La Pine
KLMD	101.1	Talent	OR	Medford–Ashland
K210CW	89.9	Newport	OR	Newport
KLVP	97.9	Aloha	OR	Portland
KLOV	89.3	Winchester	OR	Roseburg
KLVU	107.1	Sweet Home	OR	Salem–Albany
K215CR	90.9	The Dalles	OR	The Dalles
KLON	90.3	Tillamook	OR	Tillamook
WLKE	93.5	Gallitzin	PA	Altoona
WKBP	95.9	Benton	PA	Bloomsburg
WKHW	88.5	Halifax	PA	Halifax
WKHL	92.1	Palmyra	PA	Harrisburg
WLKJ	105.7	Portage	PA	Johnstown
W296CD	107.1	Jonestown	PA	Jonestown
WLOQ	96.3	Oil City	PA	Oil City
WPKV	98.3	Duquesne	PA	Pittsburgh
WLKA	88.3	Tafton	PA	Scranton
WFSH-FM	105.1	Sheffield	PA	Sheffield
WLKH	97.7	Somerset	PA	Somerset
WKPA	107.9	Port Matilda	PA	State College
WVLY-FM	100.9	Milton	PA	Sunbury–Sellinsgrove
W223BY	92.5	Connellsville	PA	Uniontown
WKWP	88.1	Williamsport	PA	Williamsport
WKYJ	92.7	Starview	PA	York–Harrisburg
WJKL	105.7	San Juan	PR	San Juan
WLVO	95.5	Providence	RI	Providence
WKIV	88.1	Westerly	RI	Westerly
WMHK	89.7	Columbia	SC	Columbia
WKVG	94.5	Greenville	SC	Greenville–Spartanburg
WKVC	88.9	North Myrtle Beach	SC	Myrtle Beach
WORG	100.3	Elloree	SC	Orangeburg
KLRJ	94.9	Aberdeen	SD	Aberdeen
K209EM	89.7	Huron	SD	Huron
K209FX	89.7	Mitchell	SD	Mitchell
KSFS	90.1	Sioux Falls	SD	Sioux Falls
KLRK-FM	88.7	Yankton	SD	Yankton
W269BB	101.7	Brownsville	TN	Brownsville
WZKV	90.7	Dyersburg	TN	Dyersburg
W292CZ	106.3	Jackson	TN	Jackson
W245AR	96.9	Jackson	TN	Jackson
WYLV	88.3	Maynardville	TN	Knoxville
WLFM	103.9	Lawrenceburg	TN	Lawrenceburg
WKVF	94.9	Bartlett	TN	Memphis
WMLE	94.1	Germantown	TN	Memphis
WMXK	94.1	Morristown	TN	Morristown
WLVU	97.1	Belle Meade	TN	Nashville
WXKV	90.5	Selmer	TN	Selmer–Jackson
WKTH	88.5	Tullahoma	TN	Tullahoma
KXLV	89.1	Amarillo	TX	Amarillo
K274BL	102.7	Anthony	TX	Anthony
KFMK	105.9	Round Rock	TX	Austin
KVLR	92.5	Sunset Valley	TX	Austin
KLTW	105.3	Winnie	TX	Beaumont
K251AL	98.1	Beaumont	TX	Beaumont
K247AZ	97.3	Sand Springs	TX	Big Spring
K222BE	92.3	Borger	TX	Borger
K222AW	92.3	Bowie	TX	Bowie
K291BD	106.1	Brownfield	TX	Brownfield
KVLX	103.9	Franklin	TX	Bryan–College Station
KPLV	88.7	Corpus Christi	TX	Corpus Christi
KLTY	94.9	Arlington	TX	Dallas-Fort Worth
KLLR	91.9	Dripping Springs	TX	Dripping Springs
K223AU	92.5	Dumas	TX	Dumas
KKLY	89.5	El Paso	TX	El Paso
KGKV	88.1	Doss	TX	Fredericksburg
K234AM	94.7	Groves	TX	Groves
KRLH	90.9	Hereford	TX	Hereford
KLVH	97.1	Cleveland	TX	Houston
KZKV	103.1	Karnes City	TX	Karnes City
KLKV	99.9	Hunt	TX	Kerrville
K300BO	107.9	Killeen	TX	Killeen
KVLT	88.5	Temple	TX	Killeen
KKLU	90.9	Lubbock	TX	Lubbock
K255BB	98.9	Mauriceville	TX	Mauriceville
KLVW	90.5	Odessa	TX	Midland–Odessa
K280GC	103.9	New Braunfels	TX	New Braunfels
K228EB	93.5	Pampa	TX	Pampa
K296EW	107.1	Pampa	TX	Pampa
KLRW	88.5	Byrne	TX	San Angelo
KZLV	91.3	Lytle	TX	San Antonio
KMLR	106.3	Gonzales	TX	San Marcos–New Braunfels
KZLO	88.7	Kilgore	TX	Tyler-Longview
KVLW	88.1	Gatesville	TX	Waco
K241BW	96.1	Waco	TX	Waco
KZKL	90.5	Wichita Falls	TX	Wichita Falls
KNKL	88.1	Tremonton	UT	Logan
K207EM	89.3	Moab	UT	Moab
K273BT	102.5	Price	UT	Price
KKLV	107.5	Kaysville	UT	Salt Lake City
K252DI	93.5	Salt Lake City	UT	Salt Lake City
K203EY	88.5	St. George	UT	St. George
K201IZ	88.1	Vernal	UT	Vernal
KUKV	90.9	Vernal	UT	Vernal
WZKC	103.1	Royalton	VT	Royalton
WLGX	106.9	Bedford	VA	Bedford
WGCK-FM	99.7	Coeburn	VA	Coeburn
WLJV	89.5	Spotsylvania	VA	Fredericksburg
WLTK	102.9	New Market	VA	Harrisonburg
WNLV	100.5	Glade Spring	VA	Marion
WLZV	94.3	Buckland	VA	Manassas
W250BQ	97.9	Newport News	VA	Newport News
WZLV	90.7	Cape Charles	VA	Norfolk
WNOH-HD3	105.3-3	Windsor	VA	Norfolk
W227BR	93.3	Portsmouth	VA	Norfolk
WKYV	100.3	Petersburg	VA	Petersburg
WKPL	105.5	Pennington Gap	VA	Pennington Gap
WLFV	98.9	Midlothian	VA	Richmond
WLRX	106.1	Vinton	VA	Roanoke
W249CT	97.7	Williamsburg	VA	Williamsburg
WTCF	103.3	Wardensville	VA	Winchester
WVIE	107.3	Charlotte Amalie	VI	St. Thomas
K210ES	89.9	Aberdeen	WA	Aberdeen
K269FS	101.7	Centralia	WA	Centralia
K203EN	88.5	Ellensburg	WA	Ellensburg
KLGW	98.5	Grand Coulee	WA	Grand Coulee
K276EU	103.1	Kennewick	WA	Kennewick
KLWO	90.3	Longview	WA	Longview
KNBQ	98.5	Central Park	WA	Olympia
K215DP	90.9	Port Angeles	WA	Port Angeles
KLSN	106.5	Dishman	WA	Spokane–Coeur d'Alene
KLSW	104.5	Covington	WA	Seattle
K300AP	107.9	Sunnyside	WA	Sunnyside
KRKL	93.3	Tri-Cities	WA	Tri-Cities
KLUW	88.1	East Wenatchee	WA	Wenatchee
KLWA	101.3	Westport	WA	Westport
KYKV	103.1	Selah	WA	Yakima
W251BH	98.1	Montgomery	WV	Charleston
WKVW	93.3	Marmet	WV	Charleston
WKJL	88.1	Clarksburg	WV	Clarksburg
W216CJ	91.1	Harrisville	WV	Harrisville
WHKU	91.9	Proctorville	WV	Huntington
W230AY	93.9	Westover	WV	Morgantown
WUKL	106.9	Masontown	WV	Morgantown
WLKP	91.9	Belpre	WV	Parkersburg
WLKV	90.7	Ripley	WV	Ripley
W235BF	94.9	St. Albans	WV	St. Albans
W257BP	99.3	Weirton	WV	Weirton
WULV	88.7	Moundsville	WV	Wheeling
W271AC	102.1	Appleton	WI	Appleton
W291CM	106.1	Appleton	WI	Appleton
W206AH	89.1	Eau Claire	WI	Eau Claire
WDKV	91.7	Fond du Lac	WI	Fond du Lac
WPFF	90.5	Sturgeon Bay	WI	Green Bay
WLCW	100.1	West Salem	WI	La Crosse
WLVE	93.3	Milwaukee	WI	Milwaukee
W247AS	97.3	New London	WI	New London
W287BZ	105.3	Oshkosh	WI	Oshkosh
W245AK	96.9	Sheboygan	WI	Sheboygan
KLWC	89.1	Casper	WY	Casper
KLWV	90.9	Laramie	WY	Cheyenne–Laramie
KLOF	88.9	Gillette	WY	Gillette
KMLT	88.3	Jackson	WY	Jackson
KRKM	91.7	Fort Washakie	WY	Riverton
KLWR	101.9	North Rock Springs	WY	Rock Springs
K299AG	107.7	Rock Springs	WY	Rock Springs
K210AM	89.9	Sheridan	WY	Sheridan
