= WLKA =

- Tafton, Pennsylvania; United States
- Broadcast area: Scranton, Pennsylvania
- Frequency: 88.3 MHz
- Branding: K-Love

Programming
- Format: Contemporary Christian
- Affiliations: K-Love

Ownership
- Owner: Educational Media Foundation

History
- First air date: 2002; 24 years ago
- Former call signs: WPGP (2000–2006)

Technical information
- Licensing authority: FCC
- Facility ID: 41202
- Class: B1
- ERP: 1100 watts
- HAAT: 251 meters (823 ft)
- Transmitter coordinates: 41°32′37.00″N 77°27′44.00″W

Links
- Public license information: Public file; LMS
- Webcast: Listen Live
- Website: klove.com

WLKA (88.3 FM) is a radio station broadcasting contemporary Christian programming from the K-LOVE radio network. Licensed to Tafton, Pennsylvania, United States, the station serves the Scranton area. The station is owned by Educational Media Foundation.

The station began broadcasting in 2002 and originally held the call letters WPGP. WPGP was originally owned by Sound of Life, Inc., and was an affiliate of Sound of Life Radio. In November 2006, the station was sold to Educational Media Foundation and became an affiliate of K-LOVE. At this time, its call letters were changed to WLKA.

== See also ==
Other K-LOVE stations in Pennsylvania include:

- WKPA, State College, PA
- WKVP, Philadelphia, PA
- WLKJ, Johnstown, PA
- WPKV, Pittsburgh, PA
- W269AS, Harrisburg, PA
