= KWRI =

KWRI may refer to:

- KLXZ, a radio station (91.3 FM) licensed to serve Ruidoso, New Mexico, United States, which held the call sign KWRI from 2021 to 2022
- KKLB (FM), a radio station (89.1 FM) licensed to serve Bartlesville, Oklahoma, United States, which held the call sign KWRI from 2001 to 2021
- McGuire Air Force Base (ICAO code KWRI)
