= KAJL =

KAJL may refer to:

- KAJL-LD, a low-power television station (channel 16) licensed to serve Fayetteville, Arkansas, United States
- KYZA, a radio station (92.7 FM) licensed to serve Adelanto, California, United States, which held the call sign KAJL from 2007 to 2012
