= WFGI =

WFGI may refer to:

- WFGI-FM, a radio station (95.5 FM) licensed to Johnstown, Pennsylvania, United States
- WFGI (AM), a defunct radio station (940 AM) licensed to Charleroi, Pennsylvania, United States
