= KLRS =

KLRS may refer to:

- KLRS (FM), a radio station (89.3 FM) licensed to serve Linden, California, United States
- KLXC, a radio station (90.3 FM) licensed to serve Carlsbad, New Mexico, United States, which held the call sign KLRS from 2012 to 2015
- KCAI, a radio station (89.3 FM) licensed to serve Linden, California, which held the call sign KLRS from 2007 to 2012
