= WMKF =

WMFK may refer to:

- WUKL (FM), a radio station (106.9 FM) licensed to serve Masontown, Pennsylvania, United States, which held the call sign WMKF from 2018 to 2023
- ICAO airport code for Simpang Airport
