= KAIV =

Radio station in Thousand Oaks, California, US

KAIV and KYZA

KAIV: Thousand Oaks, California; KYZA: Adelanto, California; United States
- Broadcast area: KAIV: Ventura County; KYZA: Victor Valley
- Frequencies: KAIV: 92.7 FM (HD Radio); KYZA: 92.7 FM

Programming
- Format: Contemporary worship music
- Subchannels: HD2: K-Love; HD3: K-Love 2000s
- Network: Air1

Ownership
- Owner: Educational Media Foundation
- Sister stations: KMRO; KLXD

History
- First air date: KAIV: April 1, 1963; KYZA: June 16, 1959
- Former call signs: KAIV: KNJO (1963–1997); KMLT (1997–2007); KHJL (2007–2012); KLSI (2012–2013); KYRA (2013–2025); KYZA: KACE-FM (1959–1974); KCNW (1974–1976); KHNY (1976–1983); KWDJ (1983–1990); KQLH (1990–1993); KAKT (1993); KOOJ (1993–1997); KXEZ (1/1997-6/1997); KELT (1997–2007); KAJL (2007–2012); KLSN (2012–2013)

Technical information
- Licensing authority: FCC
- Facility ID: KAIV: 21689; KYZA: 1244
- Class: KAIV: A; KYZA: A
- ERP: KAIV: 3,100 watts; KYZA: 280 watts
- HAAT: KAIV: 141 meters (463 ft); KYZA: 449 meters (1,473 ft)
- Transmitter coordinates: KAIV: 34°12′21″N 118°49′4″W; KYZA: 34°36′44″N 117°17′27″W
- Translator(s): See list

Links
- Public license information: KAIV: Public file; LMS; KYZA: Public file; LMS
- Webcast: Listen live
- Website: air1.com

KAIV, licensed to Thousand Oaks, California, United States, and KYZA, licensed to Adelanto, California, are radio stations on 92.7 MHz broadcasting the Air1 Christian radio network to areas north of Los Angeles. The stations are owned alongside Air1 by the Educational Media Foundation. KAIV serves Ventura County and far northwestern Los Angeles County, while KYZA covers the Victor Valley.

The two stations had independent histories prior to 1997. The Victor Valley station started life in 1959 as Riverside-based KACE-FM, and KNJO signed on four years later to serve Thousand Oaks and the Conejo Valley. In the 1990s, the Amaturo Group acquired these two stations and a third 92.7 facility—KRCI, originally on Catalina Island. After the latter was moved off the mainland, in 1997, all three stations were combined into a new regional radio service, the beautiful music–formatted Lite 92.7. The Riverside station moved to the Victor Valley in 2002. Amaturo changed the brand on the trimulcast twice: to female-leaning adult hits in 2005 under the Jill FM moniker and to classic hits as Playlist FM in 2011. On December 1, 2012, the Educational Media Foundation began leasing the signals while it purchased them, integrating them into its Air1 network. In 2025, KYLA (the former KRCI) split from the trimulcast to switch to the EMF-owned Radio Nueva Vida.

== Independent histories ==
=== KAIV ===
The Thousand Oaks Broadcasting Company applied on August 7, 1961, for a construction permit to build a new FM radio station in town, which the Federal Communications Commission (FCC) granted on October 17, 1962. Thousand Oaks was a partnership of two Columbia Pictures employees, a Los Angeles attorney, and Sandy Koufax, pitcher for the Los Angeles Dodgers; at the time it filed for the permit, it was interested in stereo broadcasting, which only two Los Angeles–area stations were capable of. After receiving FCC approval, the station almost was derailed by an adverse zoning ruling involving its studio location, the Conejo Valley Shopping Center, which had an illegal third entrance from Moorpark Road. The company successfully appealed the ruling to the Ventura County Board of Supervisors.

KNJO, call letters representing the Conejo Valley, began broadcasting on April 1, 1963. KNJO was a community-oriented radio station featuring local news, sports, and remote broadcasts from a variety of local events. Within two years of signing on, the station faced its first ownership change. In August 1964, a minority stockholder petitioned for Thousand Oaks Broadcasting Company to be declared in bankruptcy. After negotiations, the new management took over later that month, though the change in control was not filed with the FCC until August 1965 and did not take effect until March 1966.

In 1970, KNJO was acquired by John H. Poole, former owner of KBIG radio on Catalina Island, and Alan Fischler. Vice president Bob Jacobson agreed to buy the station in 1979 in 1980, it was instead sold to the Palomar Broadcasting Corporation of Encino. The transaction marked Poole's definitive withdrawal from broadcasting to focus on the wine industry.

Ira Barmak, owner of Thousand Oaks AM station KMDY, acquired KNJO in 1987. While the sale was pending at the FCC, the studios in the shopping center, by this point renamed the Park Oaks Shopping Center, suffered a fire; the station was off the air for several days before relocating elsewhere in the complex. Both stations moved to new quarters after the transaction closed, with a relocation of the KNJO transmitter site required as a condition of vacating the premises. Comedy Broadcasting exited radio between 1991 and 1992; it sold KMDY to Danny Villanueva and KNJO to Flagship Communications Company, owned by attorney Darry Sragow. Under Flagship, the station added helicopter traffic coverage for commuters into and out of Los Angeles as well as local newscasts and a daily news summary from the News Chronicle newspaper. During its ownership, in 1993, a brush fire destroyed the KNJO transmitter site, and in the middle of studio renovations, the Northridge earthquake took it off the air for 30 hours. In October 1995, the general manager died of leukemia. This prompted Darry Sragow and his wife Susan to consider selling.

=== KYZA ===
KYZA signed on June 16, 1959, as KACE-FM, originally broadcasting from Riverside at 1,000 watts. Owned by Ray LaPica, it simulcast co-owned KACE (1570 AM) during the day and offered a simulcast to provide stereo music at night using AM and FM. The KACE stations switched from middle of the road music to country in 1972. To give the FM a new identity, it became KCNW in April 1974.

KACE and KCNW changed call signs to KHNY-AM-FM on February 17, 1976, accompanying a format flip to adult contemporary. The FM became KWDJ in 1983, and by 1988 it was back in the country format. It changed call letters again to KQLH and its format to adult contemporary on December 25, 1990; the call sign had been dropped by 95.1 MHz in San Bernardino when that station, previously adult contemporary, flipped to country as KFRG in 1989. With its more powerful signal, KFRG had quickly beat out KWDJ as the Inland Empire's leading country music station, prompting the shift.

In 1992, Riverside County Broadcasters sold KQLH to the Amaturo Group, which owned KFRG. Amaturo flipped KQLH the next year to classic country, moving it in with KFRG at its studios in Colton. Intended to launch with new KCKZ call letters, local competitor KCKC objected, so the station retained the KQLH call sign for the time being and called itself Cactus Radio. The format at the renamed KAKT did not stick, as in August, the station shifted to a younger-skewing country format. It rebranded as "OJ 92.7", with matching KOOJ call letters, because it played "artists with juice".

== 92.7 trimulcast ==
'"`UNIQ--templatestyles-000000C7-QINU`"'
- Grade A signal contours for the former trimulcast of KAIV (left), KYZA (upper right), and KYLA (center), all on 92.7 FM.
- '"`UNIQ--templatestyles-000000C3-QINU`"''"`UNIQ--templatestyles-000000C6-QINU`"'
  - '"`UNIQ--templatestyles-000000C4-QINU`"'
    KYZA and KAIV
  - '"`UNIQ--templatestyles-000000C5-QINU`"'
    KYLA

In 1993, a third station on 92.7 MHz started in Southern California, originally as KRCI and broadcast from Catalina Island. Amaturo, already owner of KOOJ since 1992, bought KRCI as well as KNJO in 1995.

In January 1997, KOOJ became KXEZ. On February 24, the trimulcast began as Lite 92.7, with KLIT (the former KRCI), KNJO, and KXEZ airing a soft adult contemporary format. The programming originated at KNJO's Thousand Oaks studios. Later in 1997, KXEZ became KELT; two years later, the Riverside station gained its own morning show.

On March 29, 2002, Amaturo Group informed the Riverside employees of KELT that the station would leave the Inland Empire for the Victor Valley by moving to Adelanto, a suburb of Victorville. Adelanto had no stations licensed to it, a critical factor in securing Federal Communications Commission approval for the city of license change. In 2005, KMLT added a 38-watt booster, KMLT-FM1, on Castro Peak near Malibu, California; its city of license is Malibu Vista.

KLIT was moved to Fountain Valley with a change of transmitter location, broadcasting from a mountain southeast of Newport Beach at 690 watts. This provided a better signal coverage of the interior portions of Orange County. After this shift, with the arrival of Jack FM on KCBS-FM 93.1 in 2005, Amaturo Group moved to compete. On May 20, the company dismissed the airstaff of Lite 92.7 and adopted an automated adult hits music format branded as Jill FM. The new format was geared to be a more female-friendly sound, known as Jill, as opposed to the more male-oriented format on Jack FM. KYLA became KJLL-FM, while the other two stations adopted call signs containing JL (KMLT became KHJL, and KELT became KAJL). In 2009, Jill FM adjusted its format to soft adult contemporary music with the same focus as rival KOST (103.5 FM).

On February 14, 2011, Jill FM flipped to classic hits as Playlist 92.7, with the first song iunder the new format being "Somebody" by Bryan Adams. The new format featured hit songs spanning the period from 1964 to 2010, consisting of a mix of top 40, R&B, adult contemporary and alternative rock. In 2012, new call signs of KLST-FM, KLSI, and KLSN were adopted to match the rebranded format.

=== Air1 ===
On December 1, 2012, at midnight, the Playlist FM stations switched to the nationally syndicated Christian contemporary hit radio (CHR) network Air1. The network's owner, the Educational Media Foundation, assumed operational control at that time under a lease while it awaited purchase of the stations. This transaction brought the Christian CHR format to suburban areas of Los Angeles with the station's multiple rimshot Class A signals. At the time of the flip, Air1 played music from a wide variety of contemporary Christian artists such as Tauren Wells, TobyMac, Group 1 Crew, Seventh Day Slumber, and Skillet. The feed was also heard on KTLW's network of Class A FM translators in portions of the northern Los Angeles area as well as on a 92.7 FM repeater in southwestern parts of the metro.

The Air1 network flipped to contemporary worship music on January 1, 2019.

The call sign for KYRA was changed to KAIV on February 6, 2025.

== Translators ==
| Call sign | Frequency | City of license | FID | ERP (W) | HAAT | Class | FCC info | Notes |
|---|---|---|---|---|---|---|---|---|
| K220FR | 91.9 FM | Thousand Oaks, California | 76219 | 250 | 588 m (1,929 ft) | D | LMS | Relays KAIV (HD2) K-LOVE |
| K221GB | 92.1 FM | Barstow, California | 121962 | 27 | −3 m (−10 ft) | D | LMS | Relays KYZA |
