= WLKJ =

Coordinates: 40.383°N 78.658°W

- Portage, Pennsylvania; United States
- Broadcast area: Johnstown, Pennsylvania
- Frequency: 105.7 MHz (FM)
- Branding: "K-Love"

Programming
- Format: Contemporary Christian
- Affiliations: K-Love

Ownership
- Owner: EMF Broadcasting

History
- First air date: 1990 (as WZGO)
- Former call signs: WZGO
- Call sign meaning: Love King Jesus

Technical information
- Licensing authority: FCC
- Class: A
- ERP: 3,000 Watts

Links
- Public license information: Public file; LMS
- Website: klove.com

WLKJ is a radio station in Johnstown, Pennsylvania, located at 105.7 MHz. WLKJ broadcasts the K-LOVE Network, and is owned by EMF Broadcasting.

== History ==
For many years, this station was known as WZGO, and had broadcast a country music format for much of its existence, including a simulcast of WFGY in Altoona for many years. It had been the FM sister station to AM 1470 in Portage, but maintained separate studios and offices in downtown Johnstown.

== See also ==
Other K-LOVE stations in Pennsylvania include:

- WKPA, State College, PA
- WKVP, Philadelphia, PA
- WLKE, Altoona, PA
- WLKA, Scranton, PA
- WPKV, Pittsburgh, PA
- W269AS, Harrisburg, PA
