= KLVH =

KLVH may refer to:

- KLVH (FM), a radio station (97.1 FM) licensed to serve Cleveland, Texas, United States
- KLPT (FM), a radio station (90.9 FM) licensed to serve Prescott, Arizona, United States, which held the call sign KLVH from 2016 to 2023
- KARQ (FM), a radio station (88.5 FM) licensed to serve San Luis Obispo, California, United States, which held the call sign KLVH from 1999 to 2016
- KOHO-FM, a radio station (101.1 FM) licensed to serve Leavenworth, Washington, United States, which held the call sign KLVH from 1994 to 1999
- Karl Ludwig von Haller
