= WKVB =

WKVB may refer to:

- WKVB (FM), a radio station (107.3 FM) licensed to serve Westborough, Massachusetts, United States
- WKPA (FM), a radio station (107.9 FM) licensed to serve Port Matilda, Pennsylvania, United States, which held the call sign WKVB from 2005 to 2020
