= WLRJ =

K-Love radio station in Greenville, Mississippi, United States

- Greenville, Mississippi; United States
- Broadcast area: Greenville, Mississippi
- Frequency: 104.7 MHz
- Branding: K-Love

Programming
- Format: Contemporary Christian
- Network: K-Love

Ownership
- Owner: Educational Media Foundation
- Sister stations: WLRK

History
- First air date: 2005
- Former call signs: WJIW (2003–2014, 2017); WIBT (2014–2017)

Technical information
- Licensing authority: FCC
- Facility ID: 43459
- Class: C2
- ERP: 31,000 watts
- HAAT: 189 meters (620 ft)
- Transmitter coordinates: 33°28′12.5″N 90°50′29.3″W

Links
- Public license information: Public file; LMS
- Website: klove.com

WLRJ is a radio station licensed to Greenville, Mississippi, broadcasting on 104.7 FM. The station serves the areas of Greenville, Mississippi, Cleveland, Mississippi, and Indianola, Mississippi, and is owned by Educational Media Foundation. From 2014 to 2017, the station broadcast an urban contemporary/hip-hop format, as WIBT. Prior to July 2014, the station operated as WJIW, a gospel radio station.

In January 2017, WIBT and its urban contemporary format moved to WLTM (97.9 FM), replacing that station's adult contemporary format, and 104.7 switched to gospel and re-adopted its former call sign, WJIW, on February 8, 2017.

WJIW was purchased from Mondy-Burke Broadcasting by Educational Media Foundation in late 2017. The sale was consummated on December 14, 2017 at a price of $500,000, at which point WJIW briefly went silent. On December 15, 2017, WJIW started airing K-Love programming from Educational Media Foundation. The station changed its call sign to WLRJ on December 22, 2017.
