= WDKL (disambiguation) =

WDKL may refer to:

- WDKL (FM), a radio station (102.7 FM) licensed to Mount Clemens, Michigan, United States
- WUKL (FM), a radio station (106.9 FM) licensed to Masontown, Pennsylvania, United States, which used the call signs WDKL from 2015 until 2018
- WKTZ-FM, a radio station (95.9 FM) licensed to Loch Lynn Heights, Maryland, United States, which used the call signs WDKL from 2002 until 2015
