= WORG =

Translator of KLVR in Middletown, California
- Elloree, South Carolina; United States
- Broadcast area: Orangeburg, South Carolina
- Frequency: 100.3 MHz

Programming
- Format: Translator of KLVR
- Affiliations: K-Love

Ownership
- Owner: Educational Media Foundation
- Sister stations: KLVR

History
- Former call signs: WMNY-FM (1989–91)
- Call sign meaning: W ORanGeburg

Technical information
- Licensing authority: FCC
- Facility ID: 11643
- Class: C3
- ERP: 25,000 watts
- HAAT: 100 meters (330 ft)
- Transmitter coordinates: 33°21′42.00″N 80°41′5.00″W

Links
- Public license information: Public file; LMS
- Website: klove.com

WORG (100.3 FM) is a translator of Middletown, California radio station KLVR. Licensed to Elloree, South Carolina, United States, the station is currently owned by Educational Media Foundation and is a simulcast of KLVR in Sacramento.
