= WFGI (AM) =

- Charleroi, Pennsylvania; United States
- Frequency: 940 kHz
- Branding: Froggy Country

Programming
- Format: Country music

Ownership
- Owner: Keymarket Licenses, LLC

History
- First air date: November 9, 1947 (as WESA)
- Last air date: April 9, 2012
- Former call signs: WESA (1947–2000); WOGI (2000); WPNT (2000–2001)

Technical information
- Facility ID: 21215
- Class: D
- Power: 250 watts day; 5 watts night
- Transmitter coordinates: 40°7′24.3″N 79°53′44.2″W

WFGI (940 AM) was an American radio station broadcasting at a daytime power of 250 watts, and a nighttime power of five watts. The station was last licensed to Keymarket Licenses, LLC and served the area around Charleroi, Pennsylvania, south of Pittsburgh.

== History ==
=== Beginnings as WESA ===
For many of its years, this station was known as WESA. The station debuted November 9, 1947, and for much of its existence, operated as a full-service station serving the Mon-Yough valley, which comprises communities along the Monongahela and Youghiogheny Rivers.

Pierre Paulin was the first manager of WESA, which then operated from studios and offices at Charleroi Recreational Park on Fifth Street in downtown Charleroi, and was owned by the Monongahela Valley Broadcasting Corporation. Dr. A.S. Sickman served as the company's president. One of the station's owner principals was Milton Hammond, who would venture on his own during the 1960s to sign on a new FM known then as WNUF in New Kensington, and then go on to publish "The Green Sheet" in the late 1970s.

On April 23, 1965, Monongahela Valley Broadcasting Corporation sold WESA to Laubach Radio Properties, headed by John Laubach. William G. Richards then became the station's new general manager.

The station operated as a sunrise to sunset operation for many years until receiving nighttime power authorization in the late 1980s.

=== WESA-FM ===
WESA was joined by an FM station, WESA-FM, which signed on July 10, 1967. From this time, both stations simulcast one another part of the day until about 1981, when the first round of Federal Communications Commission (FCC) deregulation came about, eliminating the 50/50 rule mandating that AM/FM combo operators originate separate programming for at least half of the broadcast day. Both stations then became 100 percent simulcast.

The two stations were sold in May 1985 from Laubach Radio Properties to Farr Communications, headed by Alan Murdoch, who also served as general manager. Farr Communications left the stations literally unchanged until 1998, when on-air operations were split. WESA-FM became Z98 with new call letters WZKT and a new Top 40/modern rock format. Some programming continued to be simulcast between both stations, but WESA's programming was more news and information oriented, along with local talk, as had been the case in its halcyon years.

WESA and WZKT were sold in early 2000 to Keymarket Communications, for $1.3 million. Keymarket immediately changed the stations' format to its popular "Froggy" country music format as WFGI and WOGI, and then petitioned the FCC to change the FM station's city of license from Charleroi to Duquesne, which would allow the station to move its signal closer to Pittsburgh.

=== Decline and end ===
The "Froggy" country format resonated well with listeners, and soon Keymarket petitioned the FCC for a power increase of one of its properties west of Pittsburgh, and also completed the sale of another station east of Pittsburgh. With coverage of Pittsburgh from these two stations now complete, Keymarket decided to sell off WOGI to Educational Media Foundation, which used the station—renamed WPKV—as the Pittsburgh outlet of its K-Love network.

WFGI continued its simulcast of the "Froggy" format, but the station was plagued by transmitter problems and was more or less a non-factor among its more powerful FM counterparts. On April 9, 2012, AM 940 was silenced by Keymarket. In a letter dated November 19, 2012, Keymarket formally surrendered the station's license, declaring that it would not "return to the air in the future".

== Sources ==
- By any name, WESA Showed Staying Power - Pittsburgh Tribune-Review, August 27, 2006.
- 1960 Broadcasting and Cable Yearbook
- 1967 Broadcasting and Cable Yearbook
- 1986 Broadcasting and Cable Yearbook
