= KKLM (FM) =

K-Love radio station in Murrieta, California

- Murrieta, California; United States
- Broadcast area: Temecula Valley; Inland Empire; Northern San Diego
- Frequency: 104.1 MHz
- Branding: 104.1 K-Love

Programming
- Format: Contemporary Christian
- Network: K-Love

Ownership
- Owner: Educational Media Foundation
- Sister stations: KKLP, KLRD, KKLQ

History
- First air date: March 9, 2018
- Former call signs: KLZC (2015); KRXC (2015–2018)
- Call sign meaning: Derived from affiliate station KKLQ

Technical information
- Licensing authority: FCC
- Facility ID: 183309
- Class: A
- ERP: 4,100 watts horizontal; 100,000 watts vertical
- HAAT: 121.4 meters (398 ft)
- Transmitter coordinates: 33.4663°N 117.1417°W
- Repeaters: 100.3 KKLQ-FM (Los Angeles); 91.1 KKLP (FM) (Perris)

Links
- Public license information: Public file; LMS
- Webcast: Listen Live
- Website: klove.com

KKLM (104.1 FM, "104.1 K-Love") is a religious radio station licensed to serve Murrieta, California. Owned by the Educational Media Foundation, it is an affiliate of the K-Love network, and airs its contemporary Christian music format. KKLM currently operates under a Class A nonprofit broadcast license. No local programming originates at the station, as it broadcasts complete wall-to-wall syndicated programming full-time.

KKLM's primary broadcast area includes the northern parts of San Diego County, and the Temecula Valley, with the transmitter on the valley floor. Due to the transmitter's location, it is also classified as being in the Inland Empire.

== History ==
=== Origins ===
The Federal Communications Commission held a spectrum auction for the 104.1 frequency allotted to the Temecula Valley in 2009, an application was received on October 26. On June 27, 2014, the FCC awarded the construction permit to Audion Communications, LLC. The station was assigned the KLZC call letters on August 3, 2015, only to change to the KRXC callsign on November 16 of that year. On July 13, 2016, Audion requested an extension to its permit, which was granted in May 2017. The anticipated sign on date was now set for spring 2018.

In October 2017, Audion put the under-construction station up for sale. The Educational Media Foundation proceeded to acquire it with the intent to finish construction and sign on the station the following spring. The sale was approved on January 11, 2018. Shortly after the closure, the station received its current KKLM calls.

=== Early years ===
KKLM officially came on the air on March 9, 2018, airing CCM from the K-Love network, despite KLVJ and KKLQ already reaching the area. KKLM became the first new station to sign on since the 2000 launch of what is now KTMQ.
