= KLXD =

Coordinates: 34.612°N 117.292°W

- Victorville, California; United States
- Broadcast area: Victor Valley
- Frequency: 89.5 MHz

Programming
- Format: Contemporary Christian music
- Network: K-Love

Ownership
- Owner: Educational Media Foundation
- Sister stations: KYZA

History
- First air date: 1996
- Former call signs: KYUB (1991–1993); KXRD (1993–2015)

Technical information
- Licensing authority: FCC
- Facility ID: 60139
- Class: B1
- ERP: 1,200 watts
- HAAT: 433 meters

Links
- Public license information: Public file; LMS
- Website: klove.com

KLXD is a non-commercial FM radio station that is licensed to Victorville and serves Victor Valley on the 89.5 MHz frequency. It is owned by Educational Media Foundation and broadcasts Contemporary Christian music via EMF's nationwide K-Love network.

== History ==
KLXD signed on in 1996 as KXRD, a simulcast of KLRD in Yucaipa, California, known as "K-Lord". Shortly after KXRD signed on, the stations were renamed "Air 1", marking the beginning of the network.

KXRD continued as a Air1 member station until October 2015. The station changed its call sign to KLXD on October 17 and, as of November, switched to EMF's K-Love network. Air1 remained available through sister station KYZA.
