= WWFM =

- Trenton, New Jersey; United States
- Broadcast area: Central New Jersey
- Frequency: 89.1 MHz (HD Radio)
- Branding: The Classical Network

Programming
- Format: Classical music
- Subchannels: HD2: "JazzOn2" (jazz); HD3: "Viking 89" (college radio)

Ownership
- Owner: Mercer County Community College

History
- First air date: September 6, 1982
- Call sign meaning: "FM"

Technical information
- Licensing authority: FCC
- Facility ID: 41194
- Class: A
- ERP: 1,150 watts
- HAAT: 89 meters (292 ft)
- Translator: See § Translators
- Repeater: See § Other Classical Network stations

Links
- Public license information: Public file; LMS
- Webcast: Listen live; HD2: Listen live
- Website: www.wwfm.org

WWFM (89.1 FM, "The Classical Network") is a non-commercial, listener-supported radio station owned and operated by Mercer County Community College (MCCC). It is licensed to Trenton, New Jersey, and its transmitter tower is located on the campus of MCCC in West Windsor Township.

WWFM is the flagship station of "The Classical Network". Programming is also heard on WWNJ (91.1 FM) in Toms River Township, WWCJ (89.1 FM) in Cape May, and WWPJ (89.5 FM) in Pen Argyl, Pennsylvania. In the Philadelphia area, "The Classical Network" is heard on the second HD Radio subchannel of WYPA (89.5 FM) in Cherry Hill, New Jersey. In the New York City area, "The Classical Network" is heard on the second HD subchannel of WKCR-FM (89.9 FM). Programming is also heard on several FM translators in New Jersey, Pennsylvania and Colorado.

== HD multicasts ==
WWFM-HD2 is "JazzOn2", which runs a traditional jazz format. "JazzOn2" is also on the HD2 channel of WWNJ. WWFM-HD3 is "Viking 89", MCCC's student-run college radio station. WXPN's XPoNential Radio service airs on the HD3 subchannel when Mercer students are not on the air.

== Other Classical Network stations ==
Call sign	Frequency	FID	City of license	ERP (W)	HAAT	Class	Transmitter coordinates	FCC info
WWCJ	89.1 FM (HD)	41201	Cape May, New Jersey	13,500	117.4 m (385 ft)	B1	39°7′28″N 74°45′55″W	LMS
WWNJ	91.1 FM (HD)	41203	Toms River Township, New Jersey	5,800	97 m (318 ft)	A	39°59′49″N 74°10′21″W	LMS
WWPJ	89.5 FM (HD)	78699	Pen Argyl, Pennsylvania	100	230.8 m (757 ft)	A	40°51′34.1″N 75°18′3″W	LMS

The Classical Network's programming is also available on the HD2 channels of WYPA (89.5 FM) in Cherry Hill, New Jersey, and WKCR-FM 89.9 in New York City.

== Translators ==
Broadcast translators for WWFM
Call sign	Frequency	City of license	FID	ERP (W)	HAAT	Class	Transmitter coordinates	FCC info
K216FW	91.1 FM	Steamboat Springs, Colorado	82392	10	534.1 m (1,752 ft)	D	40°27′15.9″N 106°44′36.1″W	LMS
W224AU	92.7 FM	Allentown, Pennsylvania	41200	7	0 m (0 ft)	D	40°34′18.1″N 75°25′47.1″W	LMS
W245AC	96.9 FM	Harmony Township, New Jersey	41196	10	263 m (863 ft)	D	40°46′13.3″N 75°3′35.6″W	LMS

Broadcast translator for WWPJ
Call sign	Frequency	City of license	FID	ERP (W)	HAAT	Class	Transmitter coordinates	FCC info
W226AA	93.1 FM	Easton, Pennsylvania	41189	150	−3 m (−10 ft)	D	40°41′53.3″N 75°12′28.6″W	LMS
