= KLRD =

- Yucaipa, California; United States
- Broadcast area: San Bernardino, California
- Frequency: 90.1 MHz
- Branding: Air1

Programming
- Format: Christian worship
- Network: Air1

Ownership
- Owner: Educational Media Foundation
- Sister stations: KKLP, KKLM

History
- First air date: July 15, 1986
- Call sign meaning: Lord

Technical information
- Licensing authority: FCC
- Facility ID: 60144
- Class: B
- ERP: 590 watts
- HAAT: 1,045 meters (3,428 ft)
- Transmitter coordinates: 34°03′46″N 116°53′35″W

Links
- Public license information: Public file; LMS
- Webcast: Listen live
- Website: air1.com

KLRD (90.1 FM) is a radio station licensed to San Bernardino, California, United States, and airing the Christian worship formatted Air1 network.

KLRD also broadcasts its programming over the following translators: W202CF (88.3 FM) Champaign, Illinois, K208DV (89.5 FM) Saint Cloud, Minnesota, K216DR (91.1 FM Central Point, Oregon, and K224DK (92.7 FM) Fontana, California.
