= WGBN =

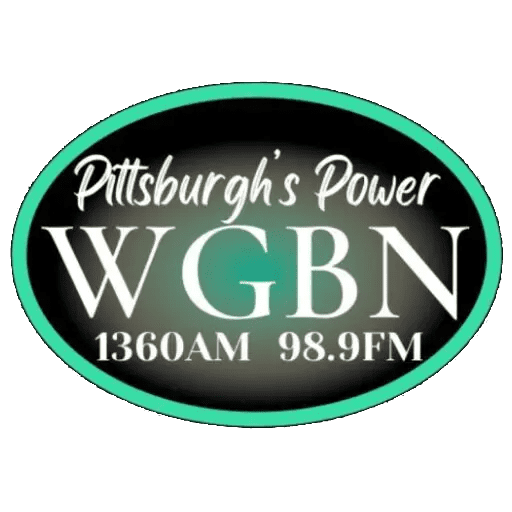
- McKeesport, Pennsylvania; United States
- Broadcast area: Pittsburgh metropolitan area
- Frequency: 1360 kHz
- Branding: Power 1360AM 98.9FM

Programming
- Format: Urban contemporary gospel
- Affiliations: American Urban Radio Networks

Ownership
- Owner: Pentecostal Temple Development Corporation

History
- First air date: April 30, 1947; 79 years ago
- Former call signs: WMCK (1947–1969); WIXZ (1969–1998); WPTT (1998–2008); WMNY (2008–2014)
- Call sign meaning: W Gospel Broadcasting Network

Technical information
- Licensing authority: FCC
- Facility ID: 59695
- Class: B
- Power: 1,000 watts
- Transmitter coordinates: 40°18′41″N 79°50′59″W
- Translator: 98.9 W255DM (McKeesport)

Links
- Public license information: Public file; LMS
- Website: wgbnradio.com

WGBN (1360 AM) is an urban contemporary gospel radio station that serves the Pittsburgh, Pennsylvania, market in the US. Owned by Pentecostal Temple Development Corporation, the station operates with a power of 1,000 watts, and is licensed to McKeesport, Pennsylvania.

== History ==
=== As WMCK ===
The station began broadcasting on April 30, 1947, with the call letters WMCK, and under the ownership of the Mon-Yough Broadcasting Company. George Raikes was company president and Jack Craddock was general manager. Studios were located at 517 Market Street in McKeesport. Its initial programming included Pittsburgh Pirates baseball games. During the early years, the station broadcast at a full-time power of 1,000 watts, day and night, changing to a directional antenna pattern during the nighttime hours.

=== As WIXZ ===
Following its acquisition by Westchester Corporation of Cleveland, Ohio, it was a Top 40 station with the call letters WIXZ ("Wick-zee 1360") beginning in 1969. Its studios were relocated to 318 Long Run Road, McKeesport, PA. The offices were located in 4 Gateway Center, Pittsburgh, PA 15222. Among its disc jockeys during the Top 40 era was Jeff Christie, better known today by his real name, Rush Limbaugh, and was also on WHJB Greensburg. Other disc jockeys at the station were Mark Roberts, Mike McGann, George Hart, and Al "Jazzbo" Collins, who replaced Limbaugh, after his departure.

On March 19, 1974, the station was sold to Renda Broadcasting Corporation. Anthony F. Renda was the company president and Melvin Abramovitz was appointed as station manager. After Renda took ownership, the stations format was changed to Beautiful Music, which was short lived. In 1975, the format was changed to country, was automated at the time, and used the Drake-Chenault Country music package, which was billed as Great American WIXZ. The station went to live disc jockeys in 1976, still playing Country music, and moved the studios and offices to 400 Lincoln Highway in East McKeesport.

On July 16, 1985, Renda Broadcasting Corporation sold WIXZ to Serena Communications, a company owned by Renda executive Alan C. Serena. Renda had acquired the Pittsburgh stations WJAS and WSHH the year before and was required to sell off WIXZ to comply with more stringent FCC ownership requirements which, at the time, limited owners to possess no more than one AM and one FM property in any given market. Serena maintained the format until September 1997, when Renda Broadcasting bought back the station after FCC ownership rules were relaxed.

=== As WPTT and WMNY ===
Shortly after the re-acquisition, WIXZ switched to a talk format, then took the WPTT call letters (formerly on channel 22 in Pittsburgh). On August 19, 2008, Renda Broadcasting announced that WPTT would be switching formats from talk to financial advice; this was accompanied by a call change to WMNY. In all of its incarnations since WMCK, the radio station has positioned itself as a Pittsburgh outlet, rather than directly addressing the suburb of McKeesport, despite a weak nighttime signal.

On September 19, 2011, Renda Broadcasting announced that WMNY would return to its "AM News Talk 1360" format. This format contains numerous popular talk programs from the Talk Radio Network based radio network.

=== As WGBN ===
In July 2013, Renda Broadcasting announced that WMNY would be donated to Pentecostal Temple Development Corporation, licensee of WGBN in New Kensington. The transaction was completed on October 9, 2013. 1360 went off the air for about a month to allow engineering adjustments that would allow it to simulcast 1150's programming. The stations swapped call signs on March 1, 2014.
