= KDKL (FM) =

Radio station in Okemah, Oklahoma

- Okemah, Oklahoma; United States
- Broadcast area: Central Oklahoma including parts of the Tulsa and Oklahoma City metropolitan areas.
- Frequency: 103.7 MHz

Programming
- Format: Contemporary Christian
- Network: K-Love

Ownership
- Owner: Educational Media Foundation; (K-Love, Inc.)

History
- First air date: 2001
- Former call signs: KESC (2001–2007); KOCD (2007–2011); KYLK (2011–2023)

Technical information
- Licensing authority: FCC
- Facility ID: 83209
- Class: C1
- ERP: 72,000 watts
- HAAT: 282 meters (925 feet)
- Transmitter coordinates: 35°15′47″N 96°22′43″W
- Repeater: 95.9 K240ED (Tulsa)

Links
- Public license information: Public file; LMS
- Webcast: Listen live
- Website: klove.com

KDKL (103.7 FM,) is a non-commercial, listener-supported radio station licensed to Okemah, Oklahoma. The station is owned by the Educational Media Foundation (EMF), airing its "K-Love" contemporary Christian radio format.

In addition to the main transmitter at 103.7, programming is also heard on FM translator K240ED at 95.9 MHz in Tulsa.

== History ==
=== Construction permit ===
The station first signed on the air in 2001 as KESC. It changed its call sign to KOCD on June 1, 2007.

On January 26, 2007, the station was granted a construction permit by the FCC to relocate its community of license to Okemah, Oklahoma. This included a change in effective radiated power from 100,000 to 72,000 watts and a change in antenna height above average terrain to 282 meters (926 feet). The new transmitter is located at 35°15'47"N, 96°22'43"W. The license to cover for the station was granted February 26, 2008.

=== Adult hits ===
On July 16, 2010, KOCD changed its format to adult hits and changed its brand to OKlahoma's New 103.7. The format, developed by Phil Hall's Audience Bakery, featured an uptempo mix of various contemporary music styles from the '70s, '80s, '90s, and early 2000s. The mix included Top 40 hits from Pop, R&B, Alternative and Rock. OKlahoma's New 103.7 was targeted to adult 25-54. The trademarked tagline was "Building The Playlist You've Always Wanted."

The radio station spotlighted events and happenings around Oklahoma with air personalities John Hart, Tim Howard, Steve Nichols, and Dean Wendt. Former KOTV-Tulsa Sports Director and ESPN SportsCenter host Bob Stevens delivered morning drive time sports. Susan Darwin and Bob Crowley delivered news during drive time.

=== Smooth jazz to AC ===
KOCD changed its format from smooth jazz to rhythmic-based AC music in April 2010. Like the former smooth jazz sound, the new format was delivered via satellite from Broadcast Architecture and was known as the "Bright Radio Network."

It continued using BA's Smooth Jazz Network air staff, including Brian Culbertson mornings and Dave Koz during afternoon drive. Featured artists included the likes of Mariah Carey, Alicia Keys, Michael Jackson, Sade, Madonna, John Mayer, Norah Jones, and Rihanna, while eliminating most of the instrumentals previously heard. The network's tagline was "Music That Feels Good."

=== K-Love ===
On May 1, 2011, KOCD went silent as the station was being sold. On August 25, 2011, the station changed its call sign to KYLK in anticipation of the sale to the Educational Media Foundation, parent of K-Love. On September 12, 2011, the K-Love network began broadcasting on the KYLK signal.

On August 31, 2023, the station changed its call sign to KDKL.

== Translators ==
Call sign	Frequency	City of license	FID	ERP (W)	HAAT	Class	FCC info
K240ED	(95.9 MHz) FM	Tulsa, Oklahoma	140535	62	142 m (466 ft)	D	LMS
