= WKWP =

Coordinates: 41.236°N 77.025°W

- Williamsport, Pennsylvania; United States
- Frequency: 88.1 MHz

Programming
- Format: Christian Adult Contemporary
- Network: K-Love

Ownership
- Owner: Educational Media Foundation

History
- Former call signs: WWAS (1980–1997); WPTC (1997–2018)
- Call sign meaning: "K-Love Williamsport"

Technical information
- Licensing authority: FCC
- Class: A
- ERP: 55 watts
- HAAT: 27 meters (89 ft)

Links
- Public license information: Public file; LMS
- Website: klove.com

WKWP (88.1 FM) is a Christian adult contemporary radio station licensed to Williamsport, Pennsylvania. It is owned by Educational Media Foundation and is an affiliate of its K-Love network.

== History ==
The station was first licensed March 5, 1980, holding the call sign WWAS, and was owned by Williamsport Area Community College (now known as the Pennsylvania College of Technology). On September 3, 2013, the Federal Communications Commission approved transfer of the broadcast license for the then-WPTC to Todd Bartley's Williamsport Lycoming Broadcast Foundation, a local non-profit organization, at a purchase price of $125,000.

Effective December 15, 2017, the station was sold to Educational Media Foundation for $160,000. The station changed its call sign to WKWP on January 22, 2018.
