= KLPT (FM) =

- Prescott, Arizona; United States
- Broadcast area: Flagstaff, Arizona
- Frequency: 90.9 MHz

Programming
- Format: Contemporary Christian
- Network: K-Love

Ownership
- Owner: Educational Media Foundation

History
- First air date: 1994; 32 years ago
- Former call signs: KABG (April–June 1993, CP); KGCB (1993–2016); KPLV (November–December 2016); KLVH (2016–2023)

Technical information
- Licensing authority: FCC
- Facility ID: 24752
- Class: C
- ERP: 58,000 watts
- HAAT: 772 meters (2,533 ft)
- Transmitter coordinates: 34°41′15″N 112°7′2″W
- Translator: 90.5 K213FL (Flagstaff)

Links
- Public license information: Public file; LMS
- Webcast: Listen Live
- Website: klove.com

KLPT (90.9 FM) is a radio station broadcasting a contemporary Christian format as part of Educational Media Foundation's K-Love network. Licensed to Prescott, Arizona, United States, it serves the Phoenix, Prescott and Flagstaff areas. Previously owned by Grand Canyon Broadcasters, Inc. and operated under the name Radioshine, in 2012 the station was given to Arizona Christian University. In 2013, the station was named the "Small Market Station of the Year" by Christian Music Broadcasters and later that year was rebranded as Arizona Shine.

Effective October 16, 2015, KGCB and translators K214DT and K270BA were sold to Educational Media Foundation for $1 million.

On November 15, 2016, KGCB changed its call sign to KPLV. On December 1, 2016, KPLV changed its call sign to KLVH.

On October 31, 2023, the station changed its call sign to KLPT. The KLVH call sign was then moved to a newly-acquired K-Love station in Cleveland, Texas (near Houston).

== Translators ==
Call sign	Frequency	City of license	FID	ERP (W)	Class	FCC info
K213FL	90.5 FM	Flagstaff, Arizona	122145	10	D	LMS
