= WMNY =

Coordinates: 40°34′24″N 79°46′58″W

New Kensington, Pennsylvania; United States
- Broadcast area: Pittsburgh metropolitan area
- Frequency: 1150 kHz
- Branding: Radio Dhoom 1150 AM Pittsburgh

Programming
- Language: Hindi
- Format: South Asian

Ownership
- Owner: Bhavna Gupta; (Radio 1150 Limited Liability Company)

History
- First air date: October 1940
- Former call signs: WKPA (1940–1993); WGBN (1993–2014)
- Call sign meaning: Money

Technical information
- Licensing authority: FCC
- Facility ID: 52241
- Class: D
- Power: 1,000 watts day 70 watts night

Links
- Public license information: Public file; LMS
- Webcast: Listen Live
- Website: www.dhoommedia.com

WMNY (1150 AM) is a commercial radio station licensed to New Kensington, Pennsylvania and serving the Pittsburgh metropolitan area. It is owned by Gagan Deep, through licensee Radio 1150 Limited Liability Company. It airs a South Asian radio format featuring Bollywood music and talk, known as "Radio Dhoom."

By day, WMNY broadcasts with 1,000 watts, but to avoid interfering with other stations on 1150 AM, it reduces power at night to 70 watts. It uses a two-tower array directional antenna at all times. The station's transmitter facility is located on Regis Lane near the intersection of Murray Hill Road, in East Deer Township, Pennsylvania.

== History ==
=== Early years ===
The construction permit for the station was granted on June 25, 1940. The first call sign was WKPA and signed on in October. It was initially licensed to operate on 1120 kHz, with a power output of 250 watts as a daytimer, required to go off the air at night. The station was granted permission by the Federal Communications Commission (FCC) to operate from October 3 to October 8 with extended hours to 10pm for dedicatory program reasons. The FCC also granted permission for WKPA to remain on the air until 3am from November 5 to 6 for election return reports.

WKPA operated at this frequency until the North American Regional Broadcasting Agreement (NARBA) frequency re-allocation occurred in 1941. That year, WKPA moved to its present dial position but continued to operate at its daytime-only status.

WKPA was a typical, small-town radio station of its day. Local news, sports, and talk from the steel town of New Kensington, Pennsylvania, 20 miles northeast of downtown Pittsburgh. The station began at 810 Fifth Avenue, New Kensington, on the second floor of a two-story building that also housed a music store on the ground floor. Cooper Brothers, the owners of the music store, operated WKPA under the corporate name of Allegheny-Kiski Broadcasting Company, with Edward Kroen serving as the station's general manager and program director.

In 1957, Allegheny-Kiski Broadcasting Company applied for a construction permit to increase WKPA's power to its current level of one thousand watts, daytime only, which required the construction of a second antenna at its transmitter site in East Deer Township. Concurrently, the company applied for permission to add a second studio location at 321 Fifth Avenue in Tarentum. This second studio stayed in operation until 1963.

The Cooper family sold the station on July 2, 1964 to Nelson L. Goldberg, who had worked for the Cooper family as WKPA's general manager. Goldberg operated the station until its 1990 sale as Gateway Broadcasting Enterprises, Inc., not to be confused with Gateway Communications, which at that time owned a television station in Altoona.

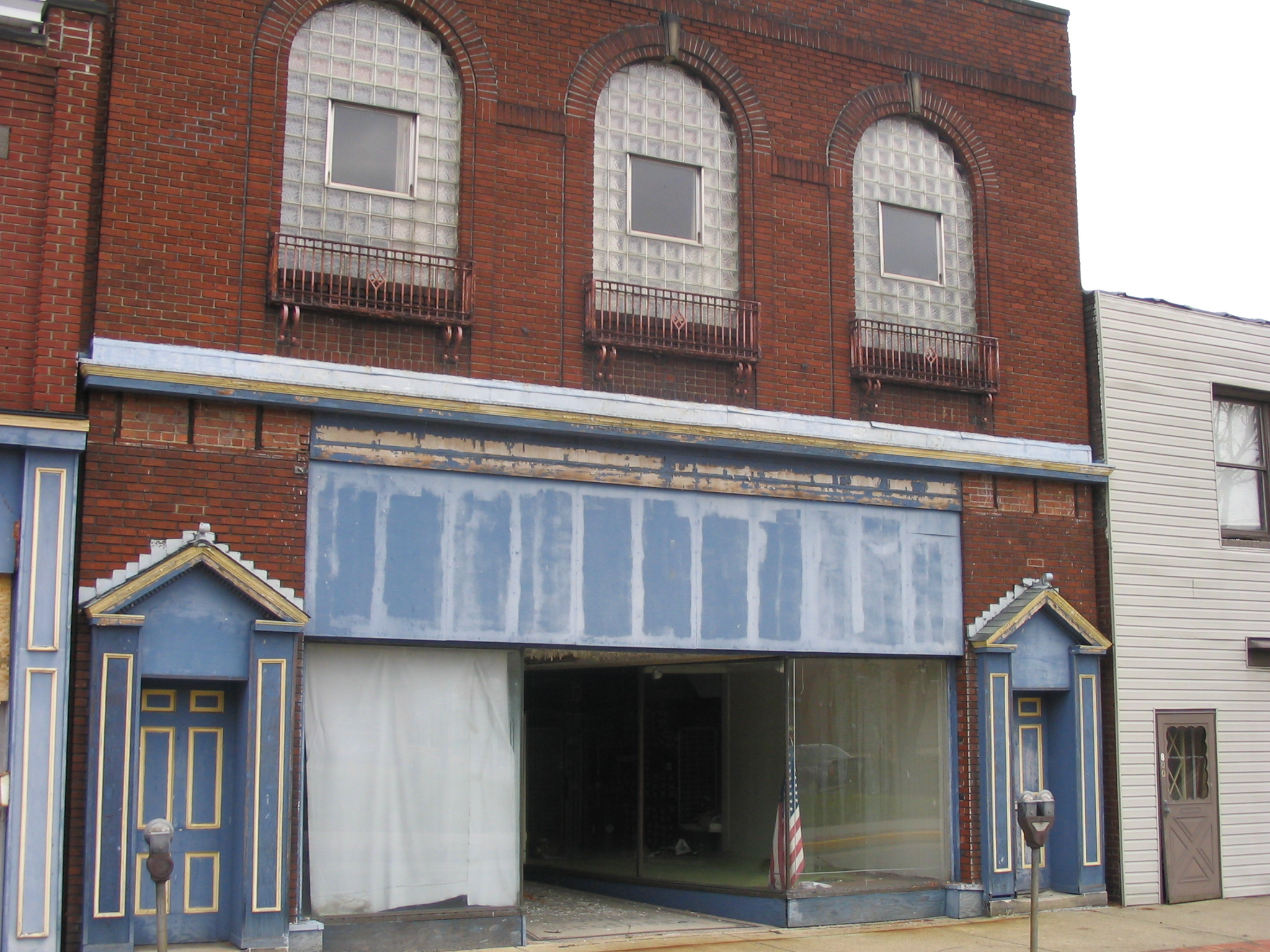
Original station location at 810 Fifth Avenue from 1940 to 1993. A roof collapse over the second-floor studios forced WGBN to relocate to another building at 955 Fourth Avenue in 1993.

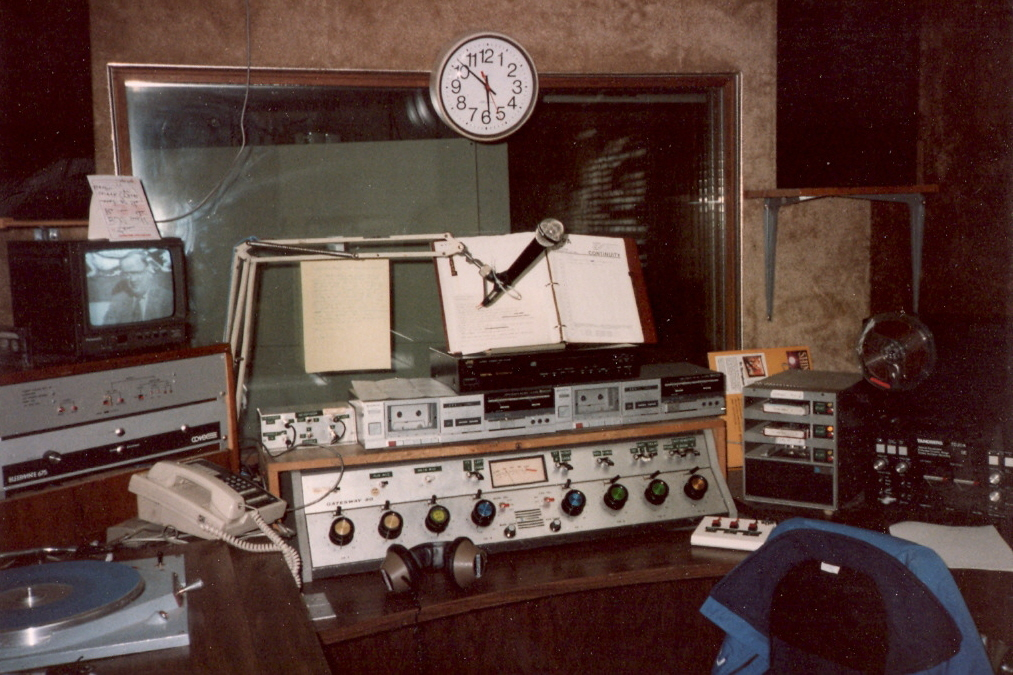
WKPA on-air studio in 1990, while at its original studio building at 810 Fifth Avenue in New Kensington. This studio was switched to production use only the following year, when a newer studio with more state-of-the-art equipment was put on the air.

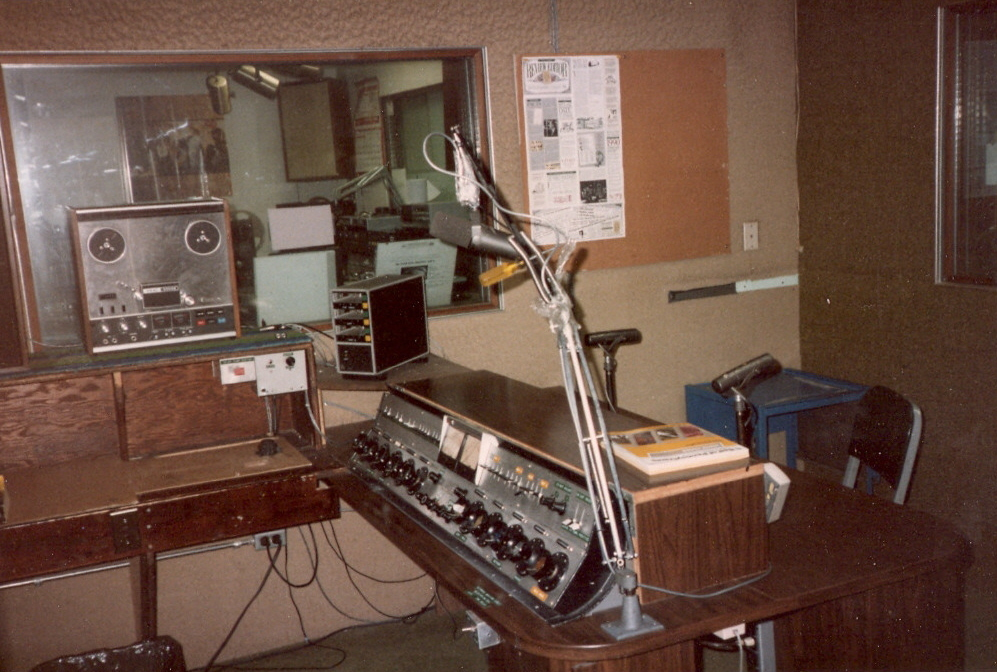
WKPA talk studio at 810 Fifth Avenue. The former WYDD on-air studio is in the background, and the WKPA main on-air studio could be viewed through the window at the right (partially hidden).

=== WKPA: the birthplace of modern cable TV ===
Goldberg, an innovator, pioneer and visionary in the telecommunications industry, developed the first cable system to be acquired by Comcast.

Goldberg's career began in radio sales at WKPA in New Kensington. In 1958, at the age of 28, Goldberg became General Manager of WKPA and then purchased the station in 1964. Goldberg acquired 104.7 WYDD-FM in 1963 and operated the two radio stations for more than 25 years. Goldberg developed WEFB-TV (TV3) and Westmoreland Cable in 1968, one of the first cable franchises in western Pennsylvania. The cable system was later sold to Comcast Corporation.

In the 1980s, Goldberg was the first to privately own satellite transponders and perceptively anticipated the advent of commercial television satellite broadcasting. Throughout his career, he continuously broke ground in developing new kinds of broadcast programming and the manner in which they were transmitted.

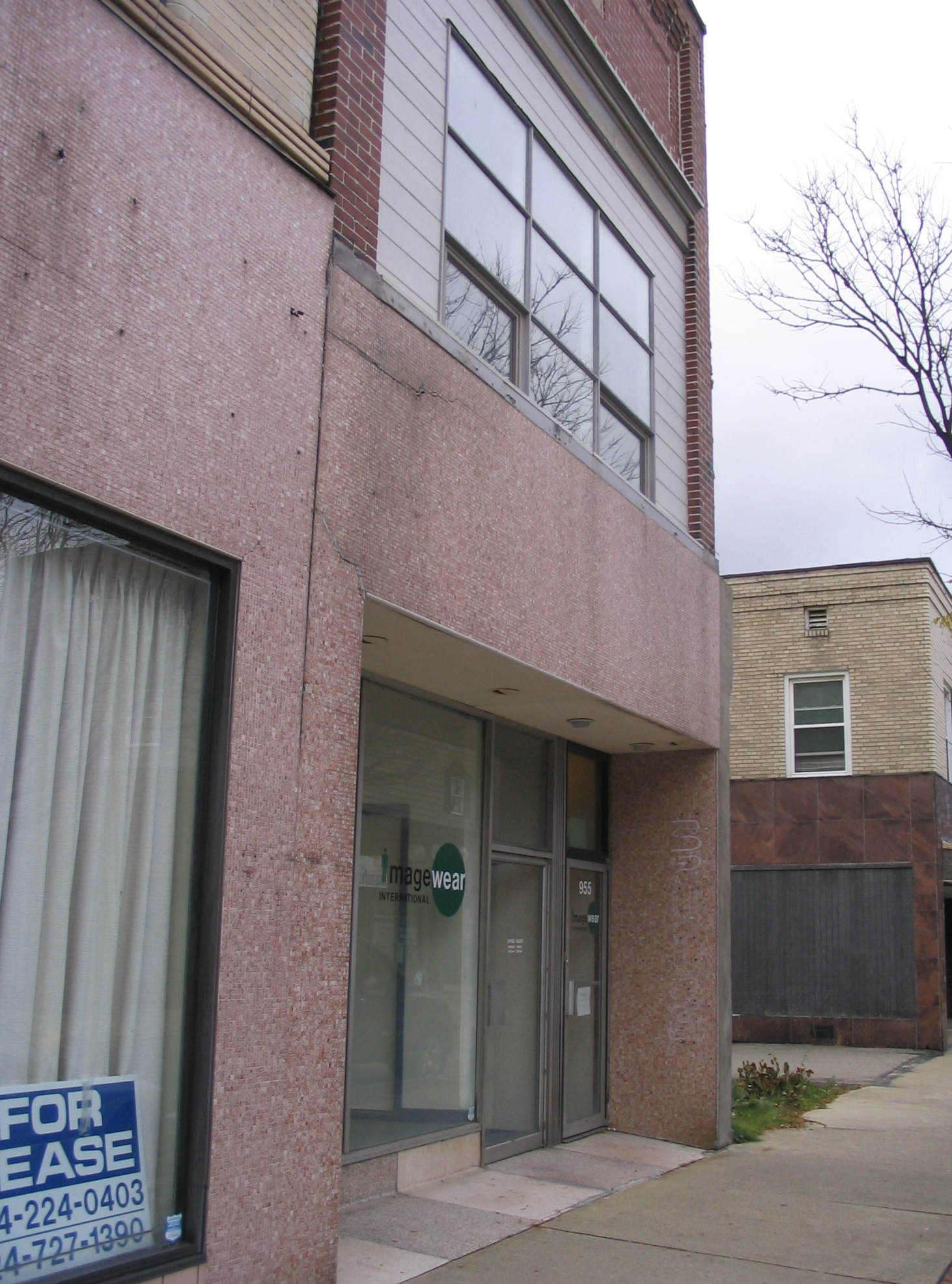
WGBN studio building at 955 Fourth Avenue. Now renovated, this building was heavily damaged by fire in 1994. WGBN occupied the second floor, accessible from the door on the right. The station had been at this location for only about a year.

=== Changes in Ownership ===
Both stations were sold to the California-based Salem Communications Corporation in the late 1980s. Salem is the nation's largest Christian radio owner, although the two stations remained secular at first. The transaction was not completed until early 1990. When Salem assumed ownership, WKPA and FM station WNRJ, immediately underwent changes. The FM outlet switched from Top 40 to an easy listening format and the subsequent call letter change to WEZE-FM, with WKPA simulcasting WEZE-FM's programming Monday through Friday, with existing weekend oldies and ethnic programming as its only original programming.

WEZE-FM moved its studios to suburban Pittsburgh in the spring of 1991, leaving WKPA at its Fifth Avenue location, but continuing the simulcast. Later that year, Salem officials announced that WEZE-FM would drop its easy listening format for Christian talk and teaching. As part of the change, WKPA would begin originating its own programming. Salem appointed former WEZE-FM announcer Ken Hawk to lead the station. Hawk, at 21, became one of the youngest radio executives in the market.

Under Hawk's direction, WKPA brought back a live adult contemporary morning show with local news and talk, plus a nationally syndicated talk format for weekday programming. The oldies and ethnic programming remained untouched. The rebirth of WKPA was successful but short-lived, with Salem spinning off WKPA to the Pentecostal Temple Development Corporation in November 1992.

=== Gospel Music ===
Salem donated WKPA to PTDC as a gift to the East Liberty-based church headed by pastor Rev. Dr. Loran Mann. Mann changed the format to Urban Gospel and the station's call letters to WGBN. It became first full-time gospel-formatted station in the Pittsburgh market. Programming was made up of sermons from Pentecostal Temple, and music is provided by Musical Soul Food Network's "Rejoice!" format. WGBN's studios moved to 560 7th Street in New Kensington. The radio station occupied the ground and second floor of half of this building.

=== Later years ===
WMNY moved to studios on Seventh Street in downtown New Kensington. The station was forced to abandon its original location at the Cooper Brothers building after the roof over its studios collapsed in 1994. The station then moved one block over to 955 Fourth Avenue, where it occupied the second floor, but the station was only there for a year.

In 1995, a fire gutted out both WGBN and the computer business that occupied the ground floor of the building both were housed in. Though WGBN's losses were covered by insurance, it was more than six months until the station was able to return to the air from its new location at 560 7th Street.

On March 1, 2014, the station exchanged call letters with WMNY (1360 AM). Two years later, on January 11, 2016, WMNY went silent. In April, the station resumed operations. A year later, WMNY was sold to Radio 1150 Liability Company and started broadcasting its current South Asian programming. The studio building at 560 7th Street was vacated sometime after, with programming originating off-site. The FCC lists the station's mailing address as Monroe, New Jersey.

=== Past Personalities ===
Among the talent that was heard on the station includes Bob Livorio, Jeff Allen, Charlie Apple, Alex Mellon, Porky Chedwick, Sean Israel, Joe Fenn, Jim DeCesare, Ford Shankle, Kelly Pidgeon, Mike Alexander and George Hart.
