= Tafton, Pennsylvania =

Unincorporated community in Pennsylvania, US

Tafton
- Unincorporated community
- Interactive map of Tafton
- Coordinates: 41°24′N 75°10′W
- Country: United States
- State: Pennsylvania
- County: Pike County

Population (2019)
  - Total: 1,401
- zip code: 18464
- ISO 3166 code: 570

Tafton is an unincorporated community in Pike County, Pennsylvania, United States. The major routes in Tafton are PA 507 and PA 390. Tafton borders Lake Wallenpaupack to the west and Blooming Grove to the east. There is a lake that hugs PA 390 called Fairview Lake, which is located in Tafton. Fairview Lake is home to an all-girls summer camp called Camp Oneka. The now-closed Tanglewood Ski Area and Winter Park is also located in Tafton.
