= WUKL (FM) =

Coordinates: 39.705°N 79.775°W

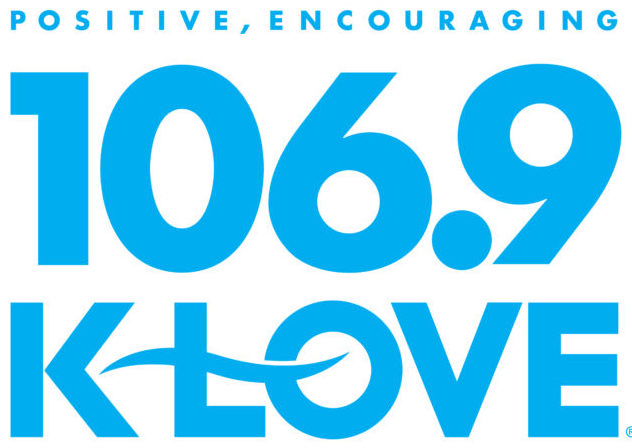
- Masontown, Pennsylvania; United States
- Broadcast area: Uniontown, Pennsylvania; Morgantown, West Virginia; Kingwood, West Virginia
- Frequency: 106.9 MHz

Programming
- Format: Christian adult contemporary
- Network: K-Love

Ownership
- Owner: Educational Media Foundation
- Sister stations: WAIJ; WKJL; WLIC; WKGO

History
- First air date: 1990
- Former call signs: WRIJ (1989–2015); WDKL (2015–2018); WMKF (2018–2023)

Technical information
- Licensing authority: FCC
- Facility ID: 26522
- Class: A
- ERP: 980 watts
- HAAT: 247 meters (810 ft)
- Translator: 93.9 W230AY (Masontown, PA)

Links
- Public license information: Public file; LMS
- Webcast: Listen Live
- Website: www.klove.com

WUKL is a Christian adult contemporary-formatted broadcast radio station licensed to Masontown, Pennsylvania, serving Uniontown, Pennsylvania, Morgantown, West Virginia, and Kingwood, West Virginia.

WUKL is owned and operated by Educational Media Foundation, broadcasting EMF's K-LOVE format.
