= WKVP =

K-Love radio station in Camden, New Jersey

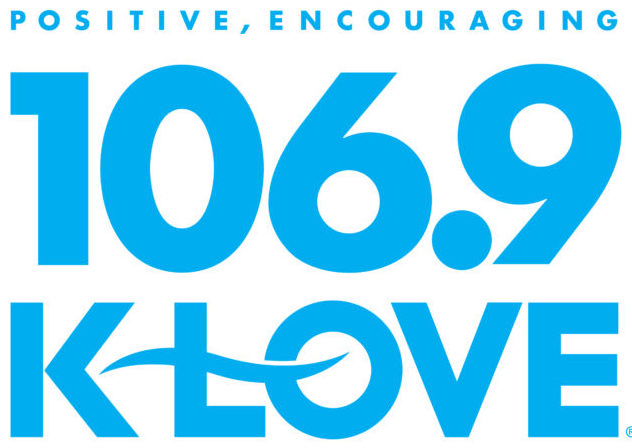
- Camden, New Jersey; United States
- Broadcast area: Philadelphia, Pennsylvania
- Frequency: 106.9 MHz (HD Radio)
- Branding: 106.9 K-Love

Programming
- Format: Christian adult contemporary
- Subchannels: HD2: Contemporary worship music ("Air1"); HD3: Christian adult hits ("K-Love Eras")
- Network: K-Love

Ownership
- Owner: Educational Media Foundation
- Sister stations: WYPA

History
- First air date: December 31, 1959
- Former call signs: WKDN-FM (1959–1986); WKDN (1986–2012); WWIQ (2012–2013)
- Call sign meaning: "K-Love Philadelphia"

Technical information
- Licensing authority: FCC
- Facility ID: 20842
- Class: B
- ERP: 38,000 watts (analog); 1,500 watts (digital)
- HAAT: 168 meters (551 ft)
- Transmitter coordinates: 39°54′33.4″N 75°05′58.6″W
- Translator: See § Translators

Links
- Public license information: Public file; LMS
- Webcast: Listen live
- Website: www.klove.com

WKVP (106.9 FM, "106.9 K-Love") is a non-commercial radio station licensed to Camden, New Jersey, serving the Philadelphia media market. The station is owned and operated by Educational Media Foundation and is an affiliate of K-Love, EMF's Christian adult contemporary music network. Its broadcast tower is located on Mount Ephraim Avenue in Camden.

== Station history ==
=== MOR music to Family Radio ===
The station signed on the air on December 31, 1959, as WKDN-FM. In 1966, the station was airing a MOR music format and was co-owned with WKDN (800 AM), which changed calls to WTMR after the two stations were sold to separate owners in 1968.

Family Stations, Inc., the holding company for stations run by Harold Camping's Family Radio religious ministry, acquired WKDN-FM for $500,000 on July 23, 1968. Under Family Stations' ownership, programming on WKDN (the "-FM" suffix was dropped from the call sign in June 1986) consisted mainly of Christian radio and teachings from Family Radio, along with some public affairs programming on weekends.

=== Sale to Merlin Media, IQ 106.9 ===
On December 6, 2011, Randy Michaels' Merlin Media announced it would acquire WKDN from Family Radio, a sale that was completed on March 6, 2012. After the sale, Family Radio continued to program WKDN through a local marketing agreement while Merlin constructed new facilities. The company hired then-WBT morning host Al Gardner, a radio veteran and Philadelphia native, as program director for the station.

Early speculation suggested that Merlin planned to utilize the FM News format it was employing at sister stations WEMP in New York City and WWWN/WIQI in Chicago, but the stations' poor ratings performances prompted in a change in plans. In April 2012, Radio Insight reported that Merlin had registered domain names and social media handles for the branding "IQ 106.9", and requested an associated change in call letters to WWIQ. Merlin had also registered a domain name for "Hannity 106.9", lending credence to rumors that the station had pursued the rights to Glenn Beck, Sean Hannity, and Rush Limbaugh's shows after they had been dropped by the competing WPHT.

Family Radio programming ceased on WKDN at 12:00 a.m. on April 16, 2012. After about a half-hour of dead air, the station returned to air under Merlin Media control, and began playing a loop of "It's the End of the World as We Know It (And I Feel Fine)" by R.E.M. in an apparent reference to Camping's failed Rapture predictions. At around 12:15 p.m., WWIQ began stunting as Hannity @ 106.9, with non-stop airings of The Sean Hannity Show. Family Radio would move the WKDN call sign to its State College, Pennsylvania station on April 23.

Merlin later confirmed that WWIQ would officially relaunch as IQ 106.9 on May 7. The new format would primarily feature syndicated conservative talk shows, such as the Glenn Beck Radio Program and The Sean Hannity Show, while The Rush Limbaugh Show was also anticipated to be moving to the station. The station launched with one local program—Philly's Morning News—hosted by Gardner and former KYW-TV anchor Larry Mendte. Gardner explained that he hired Mendte because of his "strong agenda" and belief that he would surprise listeners with some of his political positions. IQ was positioned by Merlin as a competitor to CBS Radio's KYW and WPHT—whom Mendte openly mocked in promotions and interviews regarding the new station.

Rush Limbaugh premiered on WWIQ on June 25, 2012, and the station would later add The Mark Levin Show and Overnight America with Jon Grayson to round out its daily lineup. In July 2012, the station took on former news reporters from WEMP after it dropped its FM News format in favor of modern rock.

Mendte was released by WWIQ on December 31, 2012, with the host claiming in retrospect that his tenure at IQ was "a big experiment". He was subsequently replaced on Philly's Morning News by Lionel. Gardner would then leave the station in March 2013, being replaced on the morning show by Michelle Murillo. In July 2013, Philly's Morning News was cancelled and replaced with the syndicated Imus in the Morning, leaving the station without any local programing at all.

=== Sale to EMF, K-Love ===
On August 7, 2013, Merlin Media announced that it had reached a deal to sell WWIQ to the Educational Media Foundation (EMF). The sale, which would be consummated on November 19, 2013, at a reported price of $20.25 million, would mean a return to religious-themed programming on the 106.9 signal, as EMF intended to move its K-Love Christian adult contemporary music network to the signal. K-Love had been heard in Philadelphia on WKVP (89.5 FM) in Cherry Hill, New Jersey, whose 1,900-watt signal provides only a rimshot signal to the city. The sale of WWIQ would leave Merlin with operations in only one radio market, Chicago.

Merlin would continue to program IQ as a talk station until November 3, 2013. During its last week, part of its daily schedule was turned over to Glenn Beck's online network TheBlaze, in part to promote that network's Philadelphia-focused content as well as to fill air time caused by the early departures of The Rush Limbaugh Show and Sean Hannity Show, which both returned to WPHT on October 28. IQ and its talk format ended just before midnight on November 3, 2013, after which time the station relaunched as a K-Love affiliate. (EMF gained authorization from the Federal Communications Commission on October 23 to convert WWIQ to non-commercial educational status.) EMF would move the WKVP call sign to 106.9 on November 5; the call sign's former home, at 89.5 FM in Cherry Hill, is now WYPA, an Air 1 affiliate.

== Signal and facilities ==
From the first sign-on until April 16, 2012, WKDN transmitted from a broadcast tower located in Camden, New Jersey, approximately 12 miles southeast of most other Philadelphia FM signals; as a result, the station enjoyed a better than average signal in southern New Jersey, especially in the Jersey Shore counties of Atlantic, Monmouth, Ocean, and Cape May. Under Family Radio, WKDN also operated three FM translator stations: W207AB (89.3 FM) in Atlantic City, New Jersey; W207AE (89.3 FM) in Reading, Pennsylvania; and W249AA (97.7 FM) in Lebanon, Pennsylvania. These translators were not part of the station's sale to Merlin. W207AB and W207AE continue to broadcast Family Radio programming through a satellite feed of its Sacramento station, KEBR. (W249AA currently simulcasts WLEB-LP.) WKDN's studios under Family Radio ownership were located at 2906 Mt. Ephraim Avenue in Haddon Township, New Jersey.

At the "IQ 106.9" debut on April 16, 2012, the station transmitted from a broadcast tower located on the spire of One Liberty Place in Center City with an effective radiated power (ERP) of 9,000 watts at a height above average terrain (HAAT) of 244 meters. This site is licensed as an auxiliary transmitting facility, but it was expected to eventually be licensed as the station's primary transmitting facility, subject to whether EMF carries through on Merlin's previous applications.

== Translators ==
The following translator simulcasts the programming of WKVP:

Call sign	Frequency	City of license	FID	ERP (W)	HAAT	Class	Transmitter coordinates	FCC info
W277AH	103.3 FM	Dover, Delaware	21076	80	45 m (148 ft)	D	39°09′48″N 75°32′7″W	LMS
