= Air1 =

American Christian worship music radio network

- Type: Radio network
- Country: United States

Programming
- Language: English
- Format: Contemporary worship music

Ownership
- Owner: Educational Media Foundation
- Sister stations: K-LOVE; Radio Nueva Vida

History
- Launch date: July 15, 1986 (40 years ago)
- Former names: K-LORD (1986–1995)

Coverage
- Availability: National, through radio stations and translators
- Stations: See list of affiliates

Links
- Webcast: Listen Live; Listen Live via iHeartRadio
- Website: Air1

Air1 is an American Christian radio network owned by the Educational Media Foundation (EMF), a non-profit Christian ministry. It primarily broadcasts contemporary worship music, and is a sister to the EMF's K-Love network.

== History ==
On July 15, 1986, KLRD began broadcasting Christian hit/rock music from Yucaipa, California, and went by the on-air moniker K-LORD. In 1994, KXRD was started as a sister station to KLRD. In 1995, K-LORD changed its name to "Air1" and began broadcasting via satellite from St. Helens, Oregon. Air1 Radio (formerly K-LORD) was originally launched by K-LOVE founder Bob Anthony Fogal and Jon and Noonie Fuglar.

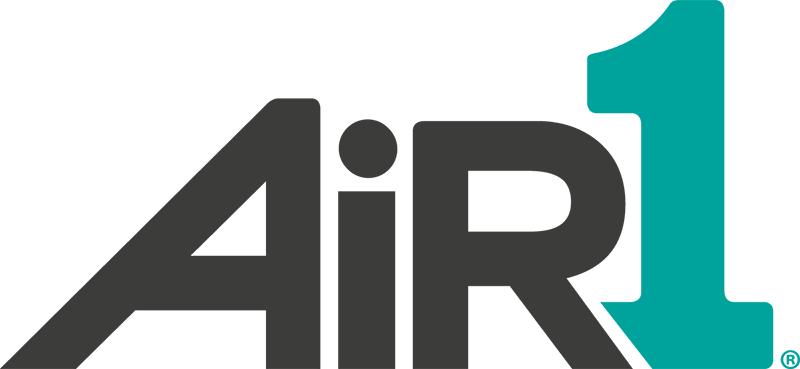
Former logo used from 2013 to 2019.

In 1999, Air1 joined with EMF Broadcasting, and finally in 2002, it moved its headquarters to Rocklin, California. Air1 makes use of broadcast translators to spread the signal across much of the country. As of January 2023, the network lists 143 full powered radio stations and 144 translators of various power levels reaching 45 states. The network's programming is simulcast on over 334 FM stations and translators in 45 U.S. states, American Samoa, Puerto Rico, and the District of Columbia.

Air1 began as a Christian rock-formatted radio network with the slogan "The Positive Alternative". Over time, the network evolved into a broad Christian CHR presentation, with the slogan "Positive Hits".

In October 2018, Air1 named Mandy Young, the network's assistant PD and morning co-host, as its new head program director. On January 1, 2019, Air1 re-launched with a focus on contemporary worship music. Although it continues to carry some CCM content, the majority of its playlist now focuses on songs by worship bands, such as Elevation Worship, Hillsong Worship, and Vertical Worship.

In 2024, the EMF launched the internet radio station Air1 Música de Adoración, which carries Spanish-language worship music.

== On-air staff ==
=== Current DJs ===
As of March 2026, the on-air staff of Air1 includes morning drive hosts Dan and Michelle from 5 AM - 9 AM Mountain time on weekdays and Sundays. Lacy 9 AM to 1 PM same days same time zone. CJ and Luren from 1 to 6 PM weekdays and 1 to 5 Pm Saturday. Mary from 6 to 11 weekdays and 5 to 10 Saturday. Ashton from 11 PM to 4 AM weekdays and 9 AM to 1 PM Saturdays. And Mandy on Saturday from 5 AM to 9 AM.

=== Former staff ===
- Eric Calhoun and Heather Shelley hosted Air1's morning show from April 2015 to November 2018.
- Sean Copeland was formerly part of the Sean and Mandy show, which was discontinued on September 29, 2011. Copeland moved to the morning show on Indianapolis adult contemporary station WYXB.
- Coppelia Acevedo formerly occupied the midday time slot, and has now moved to Houston station KSBJ.
- Brant Hansen filled the afternoon time slot from 2011 to 2014. He resigned to work with nonprofit Cure International and launch The Brant Hansen Show, a podcast that is syndicated on many Christian radio stations.
- Eric Allen co-hosted the "Eric and Mandy Show" in the mornings until February 2015; his co-host Mandy stated he was moving on to "bigger & better things". As of 2015, Eric is working for Cure International as their Radio Marketing Manager.
- Brenda Price hosted a mid-day time slot until May 5, 2015, when Air1 stated Brenda was no longer a part of Air1's DJ lineup. No reason was given for her sudden departure.
- Rahny Taylor worked as a program director and on-air host at Air1 and K-Love from November 2013 to August 2016. He departed to host a morning show on WRNW in Milwaukee. However, in 2019, Rahny came back to EMF to be the AccessMore podcast director.
