= Educational Media Foundation =

American religious broadcaster

K-Love Inc.
- Type: Private
- Industry: Mass media
- Founded: 1981; 45 years ago
- Founder: Bob Fogal
- Headquarters: Franklin, Tennessee, United States
- Products: Radio broadcasting
- Revenue: 175,719,561 United States dollar (2016)
- Total assets: 1,046,247,591 United States dollar (2022)
- Website: www.emfmedia.com

K-Love Inc. (formerly Educational Media Foundation, EMF Broadcasting, abbreviated EMF) is an American nonprofit Christian media ministry based in Franklin, Tennessee, a suburb of Nashville.

EMF is the parent company of K-LOVE and Air1—the world's largest contemporary Christian music radio networks. As of 2022, EMF directly owns and operates more than 1,000 signals in all 50 U.S. states, American Samoa, Puerto Rico, and the District of Columbia. The organization is also among the top 10 U.S.-based audio streaming companies. In 2020, EMF launched AccessMore, a Christian podcast network, and K-LOVE On Demand, a free streaming platform offering live concerts, original programming, and other exclusive content. It also oversees WTA Media, a leader in faith-based films and publishing.

The programming for Air1 and K-LOVE is distributed by satellite and carried on its own stations, including many low-power FM translators and some stations which EMF operates on behalf of other owners.

The president and CEO of EMF is Todd Woods, named to the position on March 21, 2023. Woods replaced Bill Reeves, who held the position from July 15, 2019, until March 21, 2023. Reeves replaced interim president and CEO Alan Mason, who himself succeeded longtime head Mike Novak.

== Structure ==
Educational Media Foundation (EMF) is governed by a board of directors. The current chairman of the board is Donna Ecton. The current CEO of EMF is Todd Woods.

The vision for a professional Christian music radio ministry with major-market air talent was an idea KFRC DJ Bob Anthony Fogal had in 1978 that came to fruition on October 15, 1982, when the organization's first signal went on air.

In 1986, Dick Jenkins was named president and CEO of EMF. Mike Novak was next, heading the group from 2008 to 2018. On June 1, 2018, Novak announced that he would retire from EMF within the next several months after 20 years of service to the organization. And on July 15, 2019 Bill Reeves became the CEO of EMF.

In its first 40 years, EMF has had only four CEOs - Fogal, Jenkins, Novak and Reeves (plus Alan Mason's interim role for the first half of 2019).

EMF's stations are licensed as non-commercial educational (NCE) radio stations. Funding for Air1 and K-LOVE comes from listener donations in a manner similar to public radio stations. The majority of donations are made during seasonal pledge drives, usually in the spring and in the fall.

The organization is a member of the Evangelical Council for Financial Accountability (ECFA).

On May 27, 2022, EMF broke ground for its new global headquarters in Franklin, Tennessee, south of Nashville.

== Current brands ==
=== Air1 ===
Air1 is a Christian worship music format featuring songs that are popular in many contemporary Christian worship services. In 1986, KLRD began broadcasting Christian CHR/rock music format from Yucaipa, California, going by the on-air moniker "K-Lord". In 1994, KXRD signed on as a sister station to KLRD. In 1995, K-Lord changed its name to "Air1" and began broadcasting via satellite from St. Helens, Oregon. In 1999, Air1 joined Educational Media Foundation, and in 2002, it moved its headquarters to Rocklin, California. Air1 makes use of FM broadcast translators to spread its reach across much of the country. As of November 2011, the network lists 90 full-power radio stations and 125 translators collectively serving 40 states. On January 1, 2019, Air1 flipped from its longtime Christian CHR format to Christian worship.

=== AccessMore ===
In 2020, EMF launched a Christian podcast network.

=== K-LOVE ===
K-LOVE is a Christian adult contemporary radio programming service in the United States owned and operated by EMF as their flagship service. As of October 2022 K-LOVE's programming is simulcast on over 600 FM radio stations and translators in 50 states and three US territories. K-LOVE reaches about 12 million listeners each week in cities including New York City, Chicago, Los Angeles, Seattle, Philadelphia, Nashville, San Antonio, Boston and Denver. It is also the sixth-most streamed online station in the world. The K-LOVE studios and offices are located in Franklin, Tennessee, a suburb of Nashville.

=== K-LOVE Classics ===
K-LOVE Classics was a Christian music radio programming service in the United States operated by EMF and was heard on full-powered FM stations and translators, including WAIW in Chicago. Airing Christian music from the 1980s, 1990s, and early 2000s, the format debuted in June 2018 as an Internet-only station but quickly moved to terrestrial radio after a massive response. The format aired music by artists such as Bryan Duncan, Amy Grant, Keith Green, Petra, Michael W. Smith, Point of Grace, and 4Him.

On November 2, 2020, K-LOVE Classics ceased its broadcast online, and the terrestrial stations that had formerly aired K-LOVE Classics began airing the seasonal brand K-LOVE Christmas. On January 1, 2021, K-LOVE Classics came back in some fashion with two separate streams online and the terrestrial stations: K-LOVE 90s and K-LOVE 2000s. In honor of its 40th birthday, in 2022, K-LOVE launched a series of decade-specific streams covering music from the 1970s, 1980s, 1990s, 2000s, 2010s.

=== K-LOVE On Demand ===
In 2020, EMF launched a free streaming platform offering live concerts, original programming, and other exclusive content.

=== K-LOVE Kids ===
In 2026, EMF launched a kid oriented platform offering kid sung covers of popular christian songs, shows, merchandise, live events and more.

== Former brands ==
=== Christian Music Planet magazine ===
Christian Music Planet was a magazine owned and operated by Educational Media Foundation from 2002 until 2007, when it was sold to Salem Communications Corporation.

=== God's Country Radio ===
God's Country Radio was a Christian radio network in the United States which launched in 2008. The network aired principally on stations owned by Educational Media Foundation and also on some independent stations. God's Country Radio Network played a blend of Southern gospel and Christian country music.

In November 2010, God's Country Radio Network ceased operations due to lack of financial support from its listeners sufficient to meet its expenses. It relaunched in January 2011 as an Internet-only broadcaster. After EMF discontinued its affiliation with God's Country Radio Network at that point, most of the affiliate stations flipped to Radio Nueva Vida, a Spanish-language Christian radio network owned and operated by California-based nonprofit organization The Association for Community Education, Inc.

=== World Wide Worship ===
World Wide Worship was a radio format that played contemporary worship music. It began in 1999 as an Internet-only station. In 2002, KWRC in Corpus Christi, Texas, became the first terrestrial EMF station to broadcast World Wide Worship. However, the format proved unsuccessful and, within a year, it was no longer broadcast on any terrestrial station or online.
