= 92.7 FM =

Radio frequency

The following radio stations broadcast on FM frequency 92.7 MHz:

== Argentina ==
- Always in General Alvear, Mendoza
- AZ in Rosario, Santa Fe
- Estación FM in Villa del Totoral, Córdoba
- La 2x4 in Buenos Aires
- La 750 in Salta
- La Correntada in San Pedro, Buenos Aires
- Lider in Mar del Plata, Buenos Aires
- Los Zorros in ¿Villa María?, Córdoba
- Más in San Salvador de Jujuy, Jujuy
- Radio María in Pigüe, Buenos Aires
- Radio María in Huinca Renancó, Córdoba
- Radio María in Villa Carlos Paz, Córdoba
- Radio María in Concepción, Tucumán
- Radio María in Rosario de la Frontera, Salta
- Radio María in San Antonio de los Cobres, Salta
- Radio María in San Justo, Santa Fe
- San Benito in San Benito, Entre Ríos
- Stylo in Villa Dolores, Buenos Aires
- Unión in Santa Rita Alba Posse, Misiones

== Australia ==
- Sky Sports Radio in Port Macquarie, New South Wales
- ABC Southern Queensland in Goondiwindi, Queensland
- Fresh 92.7 in Adelaide, South Australia
- ABC Classic in Bendigo, Victoria
- Mixx FM 106.3, repeater in Lorne, Victoria

== Canada (Channel 224) ==
- CBF-FM-12 in Victoriaville, Quebec
- CBTW-FM in Woss Camp, British Columbia
- CBUL-FM in Lillooet, British Columbia
- CBWS-FM in Brandon, Manitoba
- CBW-FM in Jackhead, Manitoba
- CBXZ-FM-1 in Ucluelet, British Columbia
- CBYX-FM in Enderby, British Columbia
- CFBZ-FM in Fernie, British Columbia
- CFFF-FM in Peterborough, Ontario
- CFIM-FM in Cap-aux-Meules, Quebec
- CHAR-FM in Rankin Inlet, Nunavut
- CHBD-FM in Regina, Saskatchewan
- CHSL-FM in Slave Lake, Alberta
- CIAM-FM in Fort Vermilion, Alberta
- CIFM-FM-2 in Clearwater, British Columbia
- CITP-FM in The Pas, Manitoba
- CJBM-FM in Gaspe, Quebec
- CJBM-FM-1 in Riviere-au-Renard, Quebec
- CJBX-FM in London, Ontario
- CJDC-1-FM in Tumbler Ridge, British Columbia
- CJEM-FM in Edmundston, New Brunswick
- CJMC-FM in Ste-Marthe, Quebec
- CJMC-FM in Mont-Louis, Quebec
- CJMC-FM in Grande Vallee, Quebec
- CJMC-FM in Gros Morne, Quebec
- CJPV-FM in Pincher Creek, Alberta
- CJRQ-FM in Sudbury, Ontario
- CJSP-FM in Leamington, Ontario
- CJSQ-FM in Quebec City, Quebec
- CJVN-FM in Ottawa, Ontario
- CKBR-FM in Dillon, Saskatchewan
- CKDR-FM in Dryden, Ontario
- VF2044 in Parson, British Columbia
- VF2287 in Hagensborg, British Columbia
- VF2389 in Big Island Lake, Saskatchewan
- VF2533 in Inuvik, Nunavut
- VF2558 in Pemberton, British Columbia
- VF8003 in La Guadeloupe, Quebec
- VF8008 in Weedon, Quebec

== China ==
- Beijing Sports Radio and Beijing Youth Radio in Beijing (cabel FM)
- Long Guang Xinwen Wang in Heilongjiang
- relay GZBN FM 96.2 News Radio in Zengcheng, Guangzhou

== India ==
- BIG FM 92.7 in New Delhi
- See other 92.7 stations in India at same page.

== Japan ==
- JOGO in Hachinohe, Aomori
- JODR in Niigata
- JOIF in Yukuhashi, Fukuoka

== Malaysia ==
- Nasional FM in Miri, Sarawak
- Sabah V FM in Kota Kinabalu, Sabah

== Mexico ==
- XHAGP-FM in Agua Prieta, Sonora
- XHEAAA-FM in Guadalajara, Jalisco
- XHLC-FM in La Piedad, Michoacán
- XHPCHO-FM in Guachochi, Chihuahua
- XHPECB-FM in Villa Comaltitlán, Chiapas
- XHPHGO-FM in Ciudad Hidalgo, Michoacán
- XHPQUI-FM in Quiroga, Michoacán
- XHPRGZ-FM in Río Grande, Zacatecas
- XHPVTP-FM in Villa de Tamazulápam del Progreso, Oaxaca
- XHRTA-FM in Aguascalientes, Aguascalientes
- XHSAV-FM in San Andrés Tuxtla, Veracruz
- XHUM-FM in Valladolid, Yucatán
- XHVAY-FM in Puerto Vallarta, Jalisco
- XHVJP-FM in Xicotepec de Juárez, Puebla
- XHXE-FM in Querétaro, Querétaro

== Philippines ==
- DXBC in General Santos
- DWRA in Baguio
- DWCL in San Fernando, Pampanga
- DWKL in Lucena
- DWJO in Infanta, Quezon
- DWWL in Canaman, Naga City
- DYWZ in Bacolod
- DYII in Tagbilaran
- DXCO in Cagayan De Oro
- DXCW in Pagadian
- DXSN in San Francisco, Agusan Del Sur
- DXZY in Bislig
- DXOL in Cotabato

== South Africa ==
- Radio 702 in Johannesburg

== Turkey ==
- TRT-2 in Kozan

== United States (Channel 224) ==
- KAIV in Thousand Oaks, California
- KALP in Alpine, Texas
- KBDV in Leesville, Louisiana
- KBDX in Blanding, Utah
- KBEU in Bearden, Arkansas
- KBMW-FM in Breckenridge, Minnesota
- KBQB in Chico, California
- KBQL in Las Vegas, New Mexico
- KBRB in Ainsworth, Nebraska
- KBYO-FM in Farmerville, Louisiana
- KCON in Vilonia, Arkansas
- KCXU-LP in San Jose, California
- KDSK-FM in Grants, New Mexico
- KDSS in Ely, Nevada
- KDYN-FM in Coal Hill, Arkansas
- KESO in South Padre Island, Texas
- KEXC in Alameda, California
- KFTN-LP in Fenton, Missouri
- KGBR in Gold Beach, Oregon
- KGFX in Pierre, South Dakota
- KHBC (FM) in Hilo, Hawaii
- KHKY in Akiachak, Alaska
- KHRW in Ranchester, Wyoming
- KHWI in Hilo, Hawaii
- KHWR-LP in McAlester, Oklahoma
- KINL in Eagle Pass, Texas
- KIQZ in Rawlins, Wyoming
- KISY in Blossom, Texas
- KIVY-FM in Crockett, Texas
- KJBZ in Laredo, Texas
- KJFP-LP in Hot Springs, South Dakota
- KJVC in Mansfield, Louisiana
- KKBA in Kingsville, Texas
- KKBS in Guymon, Oklahoma
- KKCH in Glenwood Springs, Colorado
- KKNB-LP in Kanab, Utah
- KKUU in Indio, California
- KLGA in Algona, Iowa
- KLOZ in Eldon, Missouri
- KMEA-LP in Bozeman, Montana
- KMOY in Dededo, Guam
- KMSW in The Dalles, Oregon
- KNCU in Newport, Oregon
- KNCW in Omak, Washington
- KOCF-LP in Veneta, Oregon
- KORT in Grangeville, Idaho
- KOUR-LP in Coralville, Iowa
- KPKX-LP in Globe, Arizona
- KQAY-FM in Tucumcari, New Mexico
- KQHE in Fairbanks, Alaska
- KRNR in Goldthwaite, Texas
- KRRN in Moapa Valley, Nevada
- KRSY-FM in La Luz, New Mexico
- KRXF in Sunriver, Oregon
- KRZP in Gassville, Arkansas
- KSBU in Delta, Louisiana
- KSJQ in Savannah, Missouri
- KSRA in Salmon, Idaho
- KTOM in Marina, California
- KTPZ in Hazelton, Idaho
- KTRX in Dickson, Oklahoma
- KTWA in Ottumwa, Iowa
- KUNK in Mendocino, California
- KUSO in Albion, Nebraska
- KUTM in Kerman, California
- KVCE in Slaton, Texas
- KVCK in Wolf Point, Montana
- KVRL-LP in Longview, Texas
- KWME in Wellington, Kansas
- KWNA in Winnemucca, Nevada
- KYCT in Shasta Lake, California
- KYLA in Fountain Valley, California
- KYSW-LP in Slidell, Louisiana
- KYZA in Adelanto, California
- KZHC-FM in Burns, Oregon
- KZIQ in Ridgecrest, California
- KZJM-LP in Lafayette, Louisiana
- KZSQ-FM in Sonora, California
- KZUH in Minneapolis, Kansas
- WAFN in Arab, Alabama
- WASU-LP in Albany, Georgia
- WAVW in Stuart, Florida
- WBHQ in Beverly Beach, Florida
- WBKL in Clinton, Louisiana
- WBNK in Pine Knoll Shores, North Carolina
- WBPL-LP in Wilmington, North Carolina
- WBUA in Tisbury, Massachusetts
- WCCR-FM in Clarion, Pennsylvania
- WCMI-FM in Catlettsburg, Kentucky
- WCPY in Arlington Heights, Illinois
- WCRS-LP in Columbus, Ohio
- WCVL-FM in Charlottesville, Virginia
- WDCJ in Prince Frederick, Maryland
- WDMZ-LP in Benton, Kentucky
- WDUX in Waupaca, Wisconsin
- WDZZ in Flint, Michigan
- WEFC-LP in Galloway, Ohio
- WEMR-LP in Chambersburg, Pennsylvania
- WENI-FM in South Waverly, Pennsylvania
- WEOW in Key West, Florida
- WEZY in Kewaunee, Wisconsin
- WFHG-FM in Bluff City, Tennessee
- WFME-FM in Garden City, New York
- WFNF in Brazil, Indiana
- WFNZ-FM in Harrisburg, North Carolina
- WFPF-LP in Frostproof, Florida
- WGFR in Glens Falls, New York
- WGIE in Clarksburg, West Virginia
- WGMD in Rehoboth Beach, Delaware
- WGTC-LP in Mayhew, Mississippi
- WHIZ-FM in South Zanesville, Ohio
- WHVE in Russell Springs, Kentucky
- WICU-FM in Lawrence Park, Pennsylvania
- WIJV in Harriman, Tennessee
- WJSM in Martinsburg, Pennsylvania
- WKKZ in Dublin, Georgia
- WKLD-LP in Bainbridge, Georgia
- WKQR in Mullens, West Virginia
- WKRA-FM in Holly Springs, Mississippi
- WKVT in Brattleboro, Vermont
- WKXG in Moorhead, Mississippi
- WKZJ in Eufaula, Alabama
- WLFW in Johnston, South Carolina
- WLSL-LP in Saint Leo, Florida
- WLSR in Galesburg, Illinois
- WMAY-FM in Taylorville, Illinois
- WMIK in Middlesboro, Kentucky
- WMXR-LP in Miami, Florida
- WOBM in Toms River, New Jersey
- WOOG-LP in Troy, New York
- WOXO-FM in Norway, Maine
- WPKG in Neillsville, Wisconsin
- WPPY in Starview, Pennsylvania
- WQDY in Calais, Maine
- WQEL in Bucyrus, Ohio
- WQTK in Ogdensburg, New York
- WRAQ-LP in Angelica, New York
- WROP-LP in Columbia, South Carolina
- WRPP in Manistique, Michigan
- WRRV in Middletown, New York
- WRXW-LP in Winter Park, Florida
- WSHF in Haleyville, Alabama
- WSJF-LP in Eldersburg, Maryland
- WSSI in St. Simons Island, Georgia
- WSWE-LP in Sweet Briar, Virginia
- WTDR-FM in Talladega, Alabama
- WURB-LP in Kissimmee, Florida
- WVLI in Kankakee, Illinois
- WVTO-LP in Baltimore, Maryland
- WVZA in Herrin, Illinois
- WXFC-LP in Blue Ridge, Georgia
- WXGN-LP in Ocean City, New Jersey
- WXKU-FM in Austin, Indiana
- WXUR in Herkimer, New York
- WYVN in Saugatuck, Michigan
- WZBD in Berne, Indiana
- WZBY in Grand Portage, Minnesota
- WZOP-LP in Fort Lauderdale, Florida
