= KVCK =

KVCK may refer to:

- KVCK (AM), a radio station (1450 AM) licensed to Wolf Point, Montana, United States
- KVCK-FM, a radio station (92.7 FM) licensed to Wolf Point, Montana, United States
