= KHKY =

KHKY may refer to:

- KHKY (FM), a radio station (92.7 FM) licensed to serve Akiachak, Alaska, United States
- Hickory Regional Airport (ICAO code KHKY)
