= WIDS =

WIDS may refer to:

- Wireless intrusion detection system, a system to provide security against wireless attacks.
- WIDS (AM), a radio station (570 AM) licensed to Russell Springs, Kentucky, United States.
- WiDS (software), a framework for creating large distributed systems, developed by Microsoft.
- Wid's Daily - an earlier name of Film Daily
