= 570 AM =

AM radio frequency

The following radio stations broadcast on the AM frequency of 570 kHz : 570 AM is a regional broadcast frequency.

== Argentina ==
- Radio Argentina in Buenos Aires

== Brazil ==
- ZYH-613 in Juaziero Norte
- ZYH-614 in Itapipoca
- ZYH-750 in Bariri
- ZYH890 in Imperatriz
- ZYJ-735 in Criciuma
- ZYJ794 in Dion Cerquei
- ZYK-595 in Itapeva
- ZYK267 in São José dos Quatro Marcos
- ZYK-672 in Taubate
- ZYK-698 in Nhandeara
- ZYK717 in Bairi
- ZYL-261 in Belo Horizonte

== Canada ==
| Call sign | City of license | Daytime power (kW) | Nighttime power (kW) | Transmitter coordinates |
|---|---|---|---|---|
| CFCB | Corner Brook, Newfoundland and Labrador | 10 | 1 | 48.936944°N 57.991111°W |
| CKSW | Swift Current, Saskatchewan | 10 | 10 | 50.160833°N 107.816944°W |
| CKWL | Williams Lake, British Columbia | 1 | 1 | 52.989444°N 122.565833°W |

== Chile ==
- CB-057 in Santiago
- CD-057 in Base Teniente R. Marsh Martin / Base Presidente Eduardo Frei Montalva / Villa las Estrellas

== Colombia ==
- HJND in Bogotá
- HJC61 in Puerto Carreño

== Costa Rica ==
- TISBJ in San José

== Cuba ==
- CMEA in Santa Clara
- CMNA in Pilon

== Denmark ==
=== Greenland ===
- OXI in Nuuk

== Dominican Republic ==
- HIMS in Santo Domingo

== Ecuador ==
- HCRM1 in Quito

== El Salvador ==
- YSKT San Salvador

== Guatemala ==
- TGPA in Palmeras

== Mexico ==
- XEBJB-AM in Apodaca, Nuevo León
- XECSAY-AM in Morelia, Michoacán
- XELQ-AM in Morelia, Michoacán
- XEOA-AM in Oaxaca de Juárez, Oaxaca
- XETD-AM in Tecuala, Nayarit
- XEUK-AM in Caborca, Sonora
- XEVJP-AM in Xicotepec de Juárez, Puebla

== Nicaragua ==
- YNR3

== Panama ==
- HORS in Maria Henriquez

== Paraguay ==
- ZP 15 in Pedro Juan Caballero

== Peru ==
- OAX3X in Chimbote

== United States ==
| Call sign | City of license | Facility ID | Class | Daytime power (kW) | Nighttime power (kW) | Unlimited power (kW) | Transmitter coordinates |
|---|---|---|---|---|---|---|---|
| KCFJ | Alturas, California | 33733 | D | 5 | 0.042 | | 41.305556°N 120.513889°W |
| KLAC | Los Angeles, California | 59958 | B | 5 | 5 | | 34.069722°N 118.193333°W |
| KLIF | Dallas, Texas | 35061 | B | 5 | 2.4 | | 32.944722°N 96.940278°W |
| KNRS | Salt Lake City, Utah | 63818 | B | | | 5 | 40.819167°N 111.932222°W |
| KUAI | Eleele, Hawaii | 58938 | B | 1 | 1 | | 21.991944°N 159.405833°W |
| KVI | Seattle, Washington | 35853 | B | | | 5 | 47.421944°N 122.428889°W |
| KWML | Las Cruces, New Mexico | 63950 | D | 5 | 0.155 | | 32.309167°N 106.823333°W |
| WAAX | Gadsden, Alabama | 22996 | B | 5 | 0.5 | | 33.979167°N 86.0025°W |
| WBMP | Paducah, Kentucky | 6874 | B | 1 | 0.5 | | 37.014722°N 88.612778°W |
| WIDS | Russell Springs, Kentucky | 37447 | D | 0.5 | 0.042 | | 37.094167°N 85.080278°W |
| WKBN | Youngstown, Ohio | 70519 | B | 5 | 5 | | 40.985000°N 80.6°W (daytime); 40.985278°N 80.600556°W (nighttime) |
| WMAM | Marinette, Wisconsin | 40149 | D | 0.25 | 0.1 | | 45.100556°N 87.625°W |
| WMCA | New York, New York | 58626 | B | 5 | 5 | | 40.752778°N 74.104167°W |
| WNAX | Yankton, South Dakota | 57846 | B | 5 | 5 | | 42.913056°N 97.316111°W |
| WQDR | Raleigh, North Carolina | 61698 | D | 1 | 0.04 | | 35.793056°N 78.761389°W |
| WSYR | Syracuse, New York | 48720 | B | 5 | 5 | | 42.986944°N 76.1525°W |
| WTBN | Pinellas Park, Florida | 51985 | B | 0.25 | 0.73 | | 28.211111°N 82.529444°W |
| WWNC | Asheville, North Carolina | 2946 | B | 5 | 5 | | 35.596944°N 82.606667°W |
| WWRC | Bethesda, Maryland | 11846 | B | 5 | 1 | | 39.134167°N 77.303889°W |

== Uruguay ==
- CX 57 in Treinta y Tres

== Venezuela ==
- YVLZ in Villa De Cura
