= Dan Pyle =

American painter

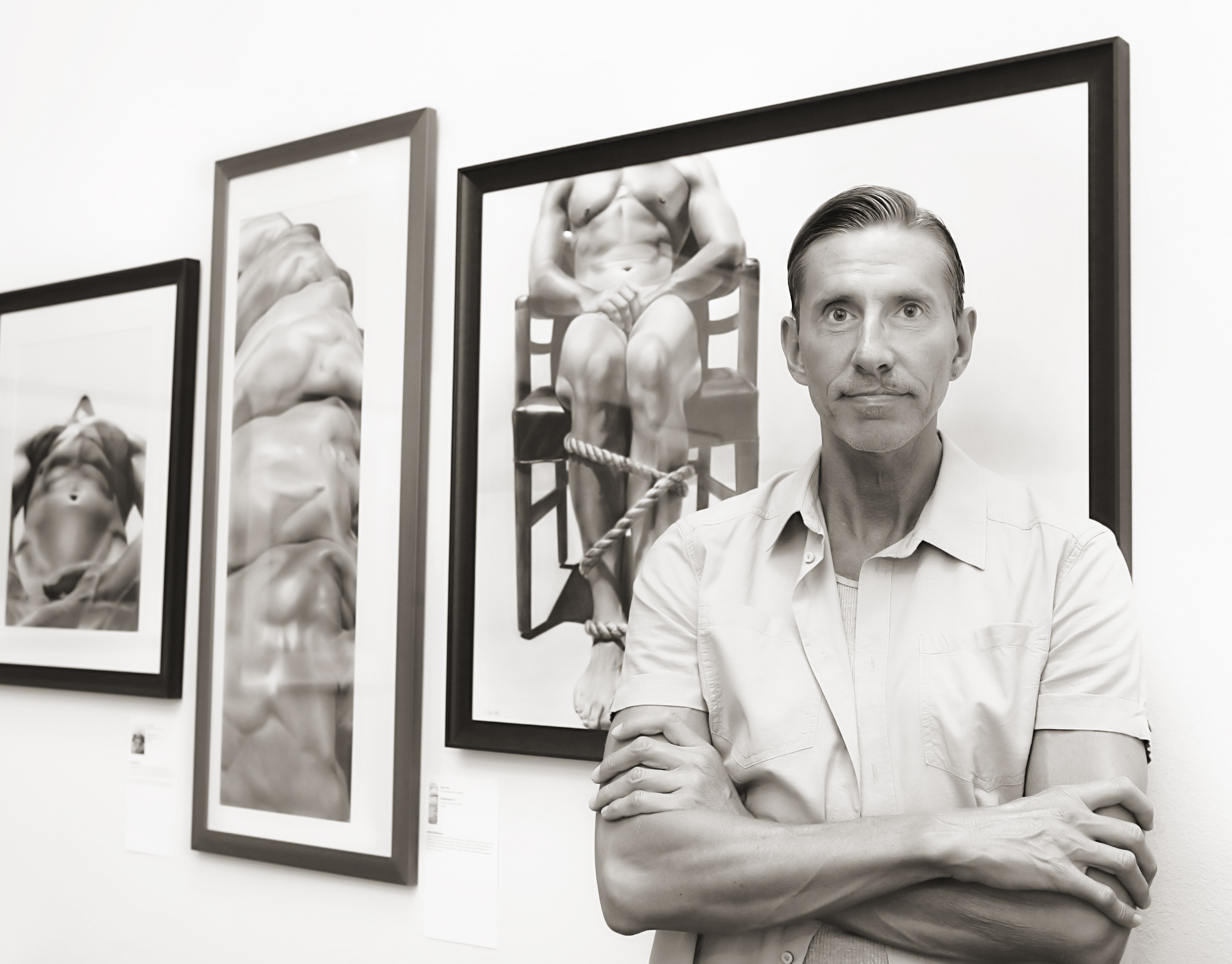
- Dan Pyle (2012)
- Born: April 4, 1954 (age 72); Wolf Point, U.S.
- Known for: Painting
- Movement: Contemporary realism

Dan Pyle (born April 4, 1954, in Wolf Point, Montana) is an American artist and a representative of Contemporary Realism. He works mainly in charcoal and his drawings highlight figurative objects in general and the human body in particular.

== Life ==
=== Career and artistic influence ===
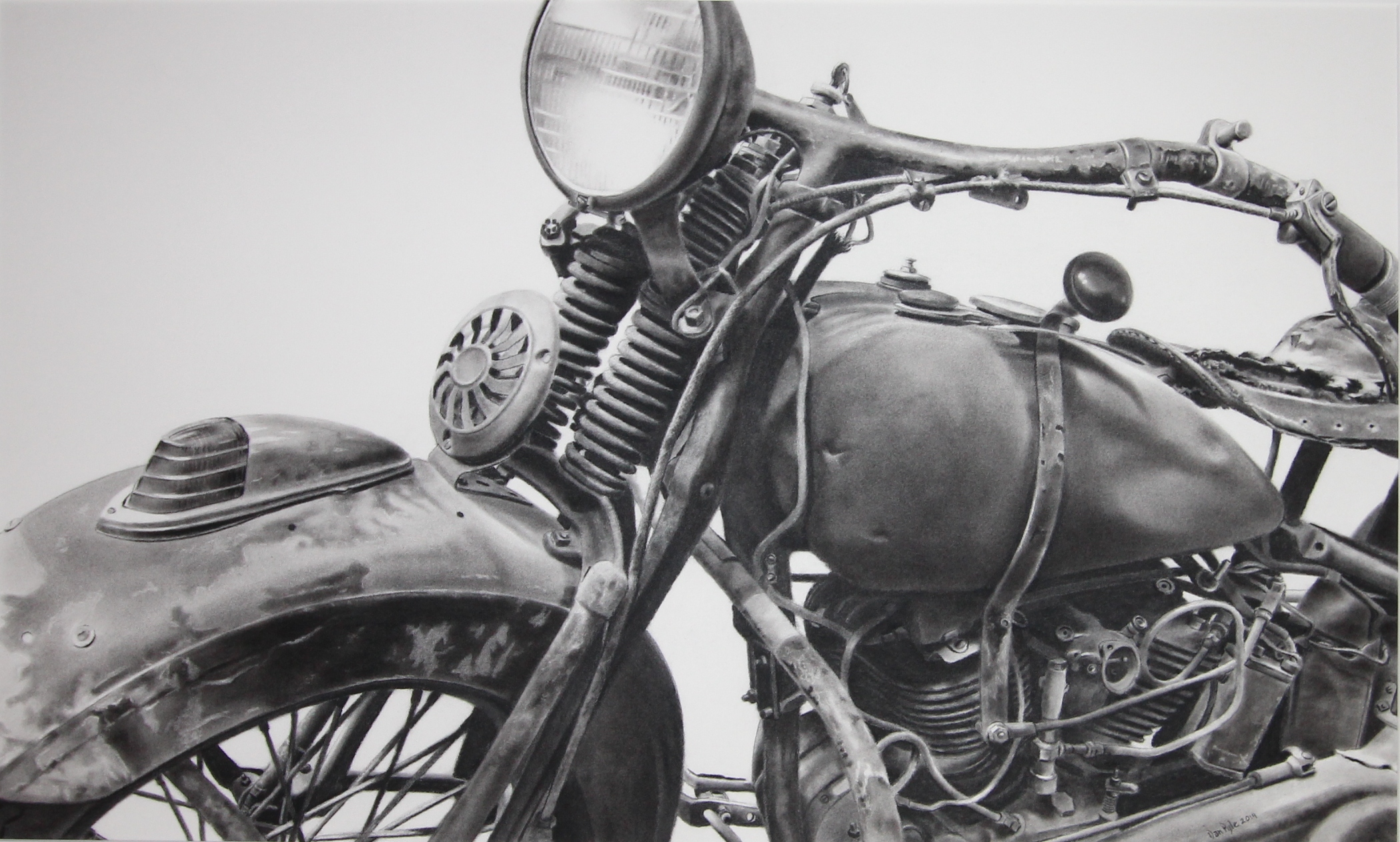
Weary Traveller (2014)

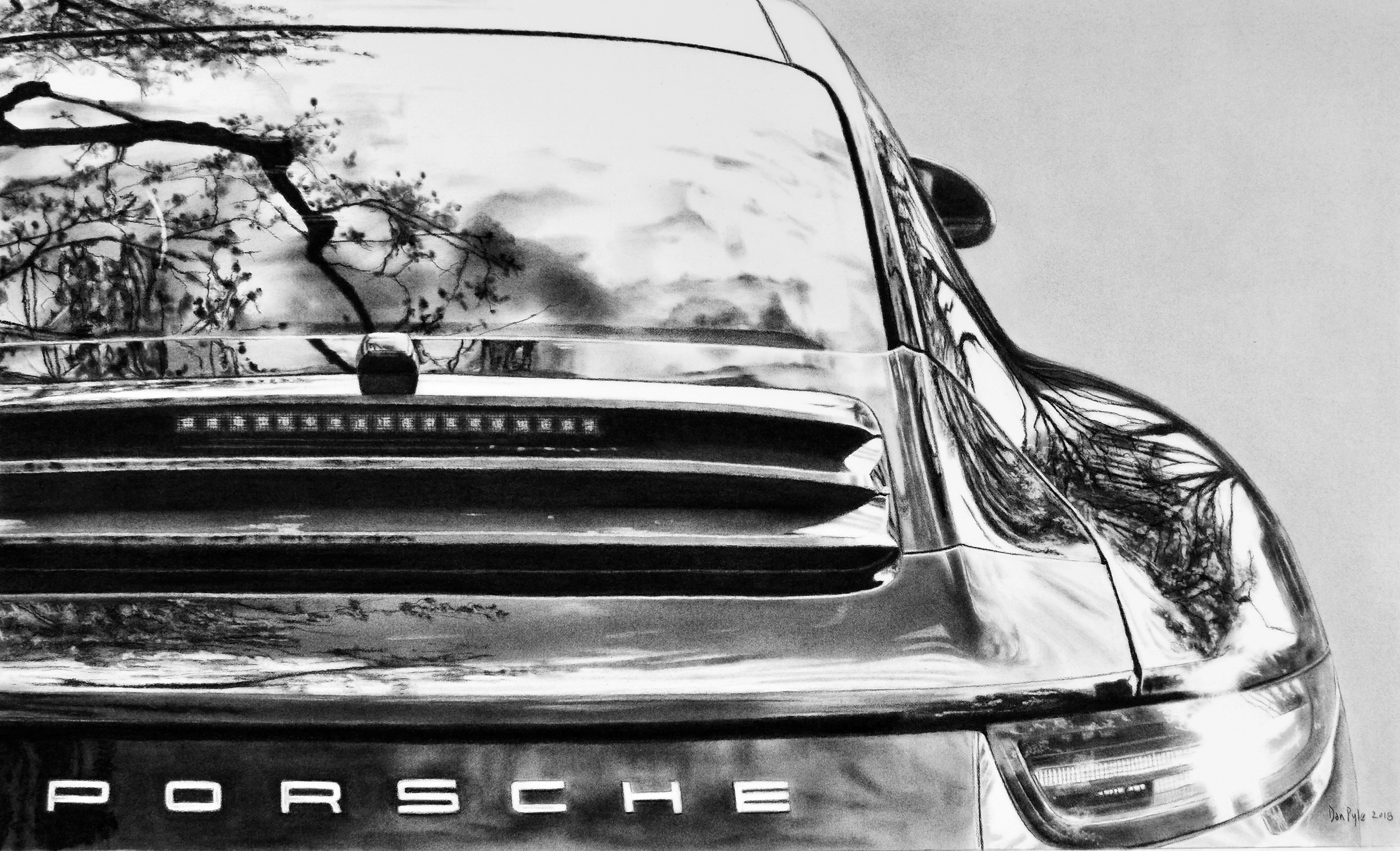
West Hollywood Porsche (2018)

Dan Pyle was born in Wolf Point, Montana, and grew up in Washington state. Dan Pyle has been drawing since his childhood and was awarded for his works early on. However, his artistic career began as a dancer with the Pacific Northwest Ballet in Seattle, and was substantially influenced by his admiration for black and white photography. This cross fertilization is where his specific artistic style developed. Moreover, Pyle's work is marked by contrasts and the special light of a Jan Vermeer and a William Turner. Thematically, the human body with its muscles, shapes and movements are at the forefront of his work, which he is able to present authentically and expressively as a former ballet dancer. After moving to California, Dan Pyle settled in West Hollywood, developing his detailed technique with new and unconventional materials.

=== Style and techniques ===
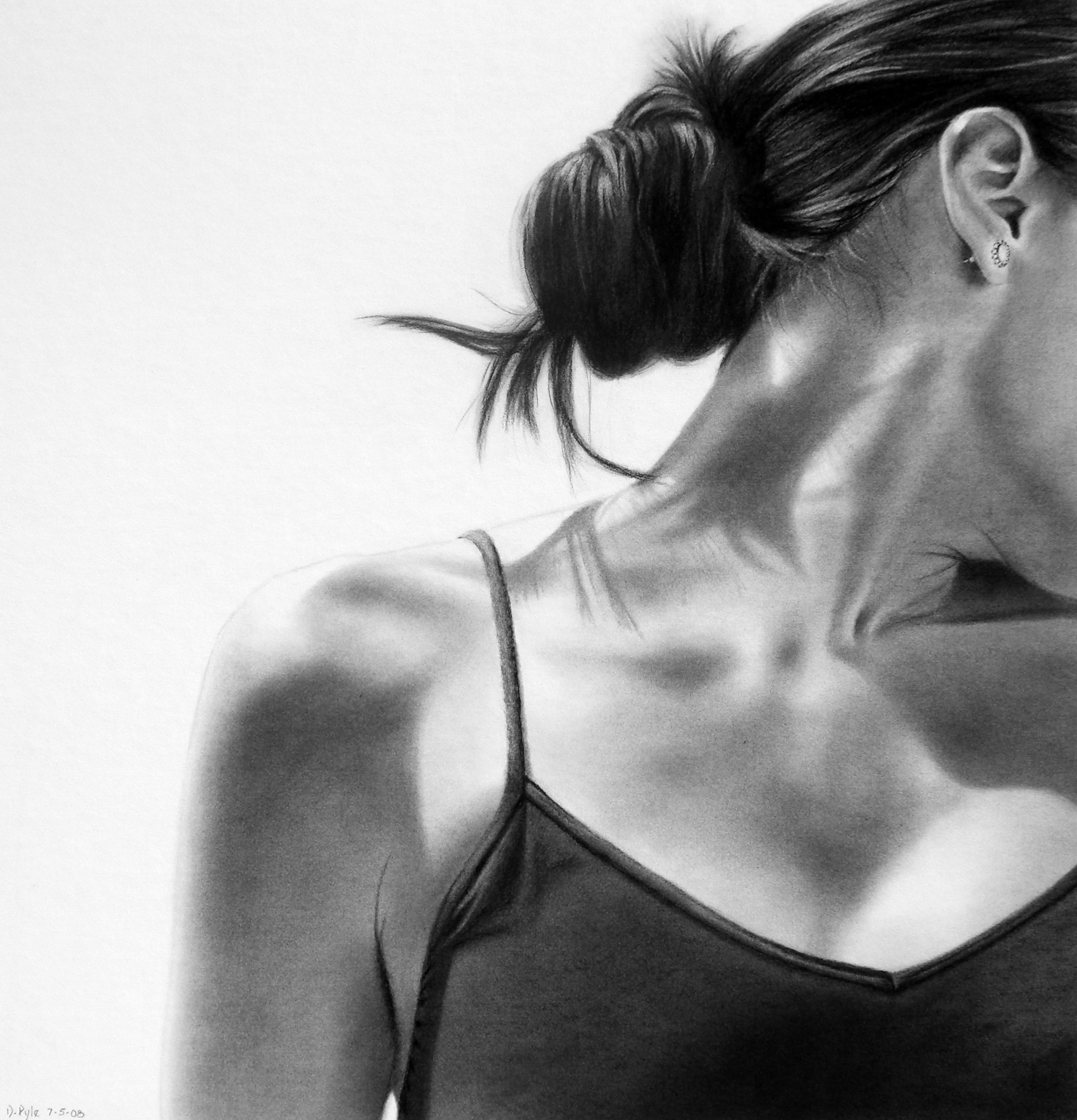
Lost in the Moment (2008)

Pyle's media initially include paintings in oil and acrylic, and, during a later period, murals for public spaces. After several phases, in which he also experimented with ink and pencil, as well as pastels and watercolors, Pyle finally found charcoal as the medium of his choice. In addition to focusing on the human body there are unexpected and aged objects that he transforms into his charcoal compositions. So, in addition to living figures, old teapots to rusted motorcycles become his models to which he gives a new identity through the use of contrast, negative space and isolation. The anonymity that his art is reflecting are subject and intention at the same time.

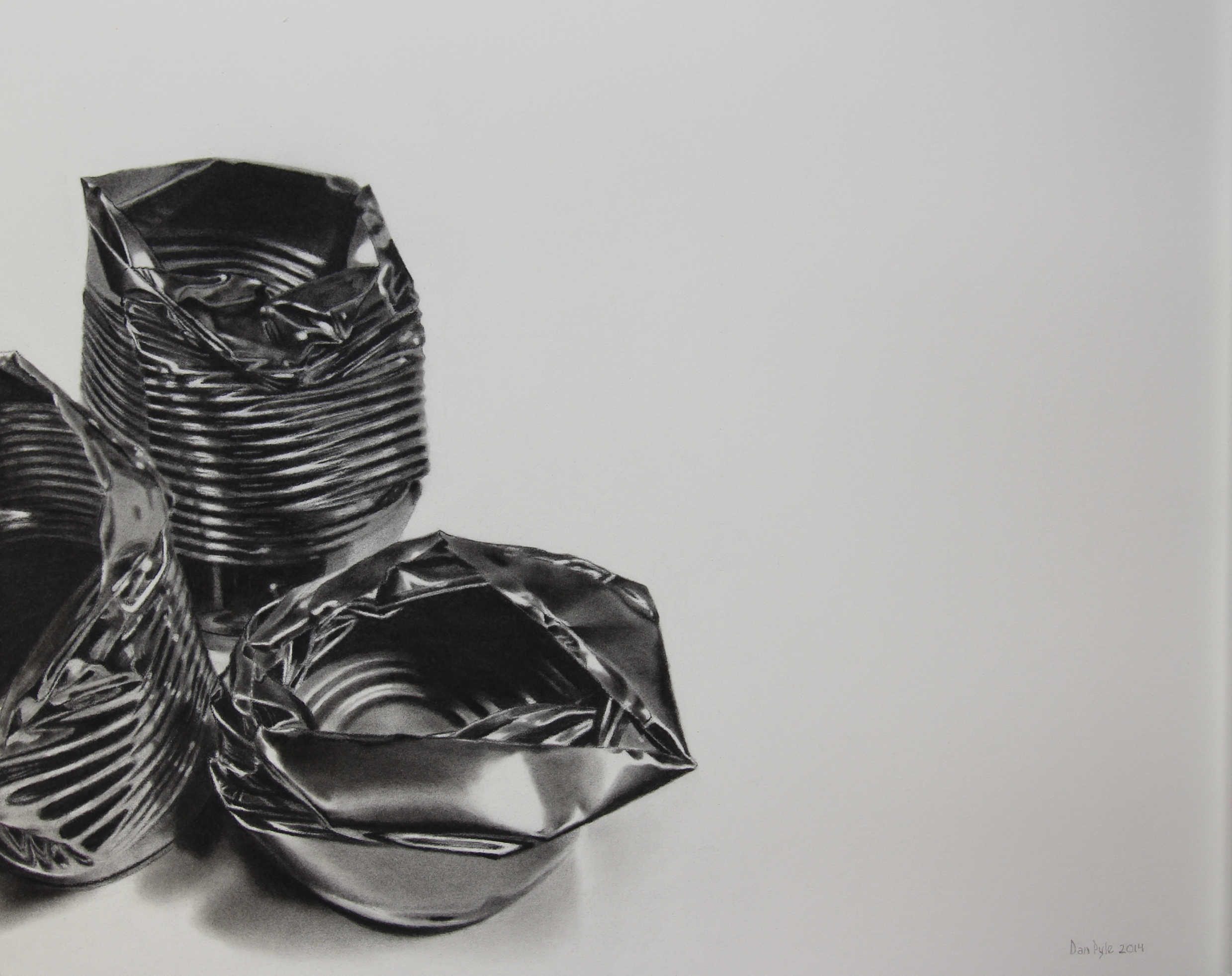
Crushed (2014)

Pyle's technique with shadows and light seems to make the presence of color superfluous. So only a few of his works show deliberately weak color characteristics. Even in his current phase, the artist shows himself adventurous and works, e.g., with formats on wood. The substrate with its idiosyncratic structures gives his drawings an additional dimension.

When editing his works Pyle aims to include negative space which isolates the subject of the drawing. His original compositions are already in his mind's eye, and the photography helps Pyle to capture the exact vision that he wants to realize. By avoiding a final photographic sharpness, Pyle's work breaks away from photorealism and takes on its own interpretation of modern realism.

=== Exhibitions ===
Dan Pyle's works are exhibited primarily in the US and increasingly in Europe. With 23 images, the Cosmopolitan Hotel in Las Vegas owns one of the largest private collections. Other exhibitions were held in West Hollywood, Palm Springs, Beverly Hills, Los Angeles, Hollywood, Santa Ana, Long Beach, Provincetown and New York, and now also in Asia.

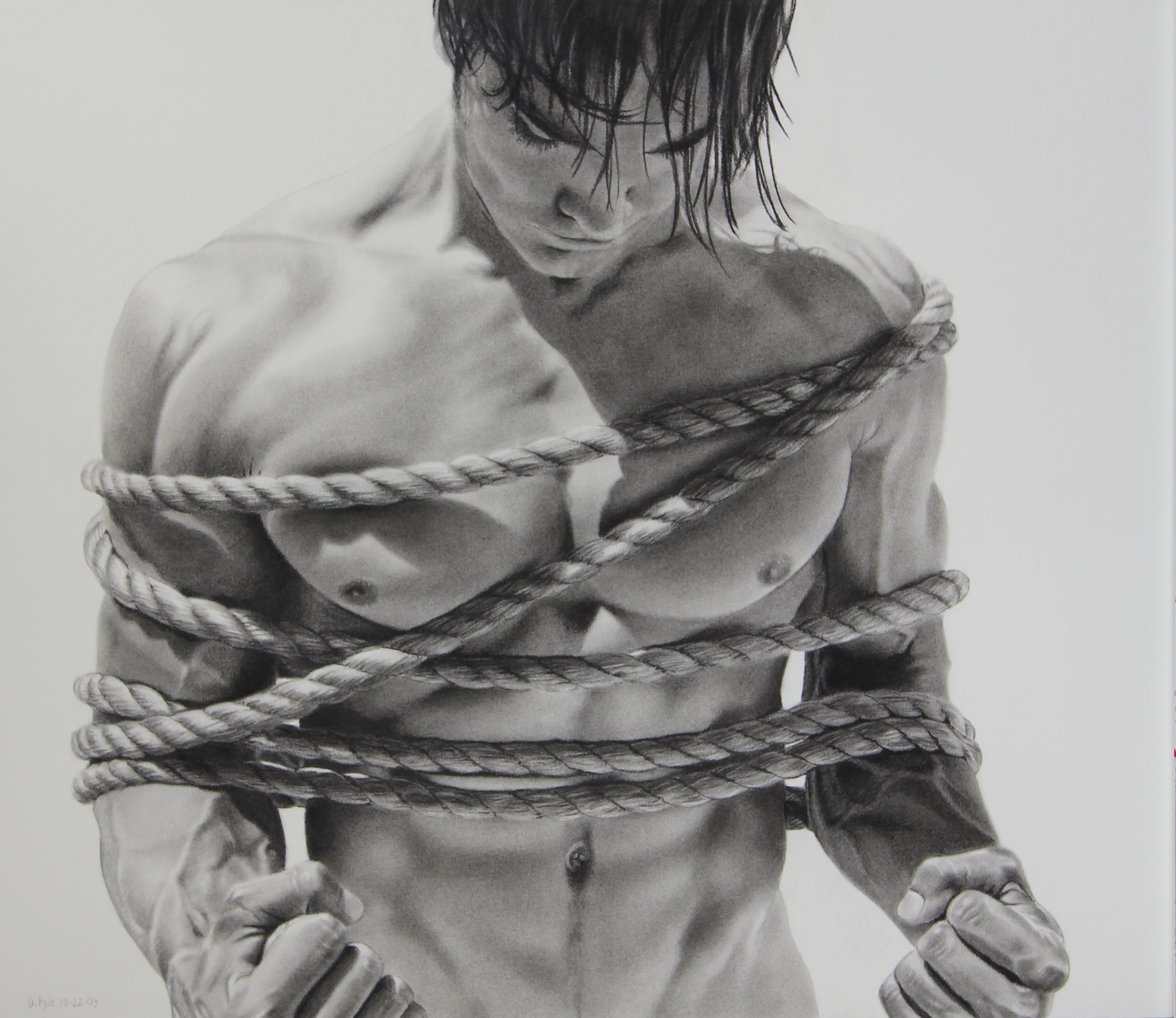
In Pursuit of Freedom (1) (2009)

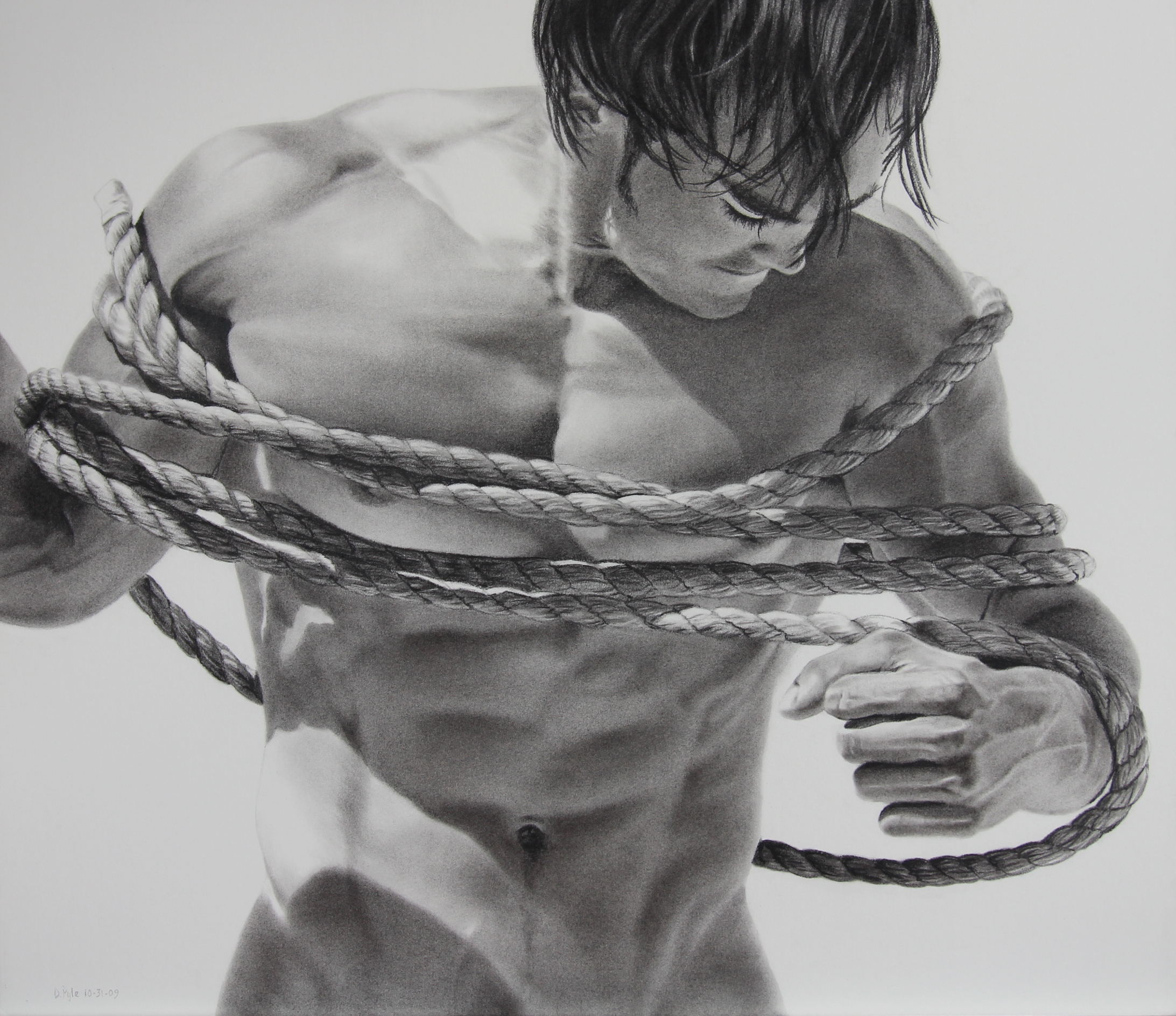
In Pursuit of Freedom (2) (2009)

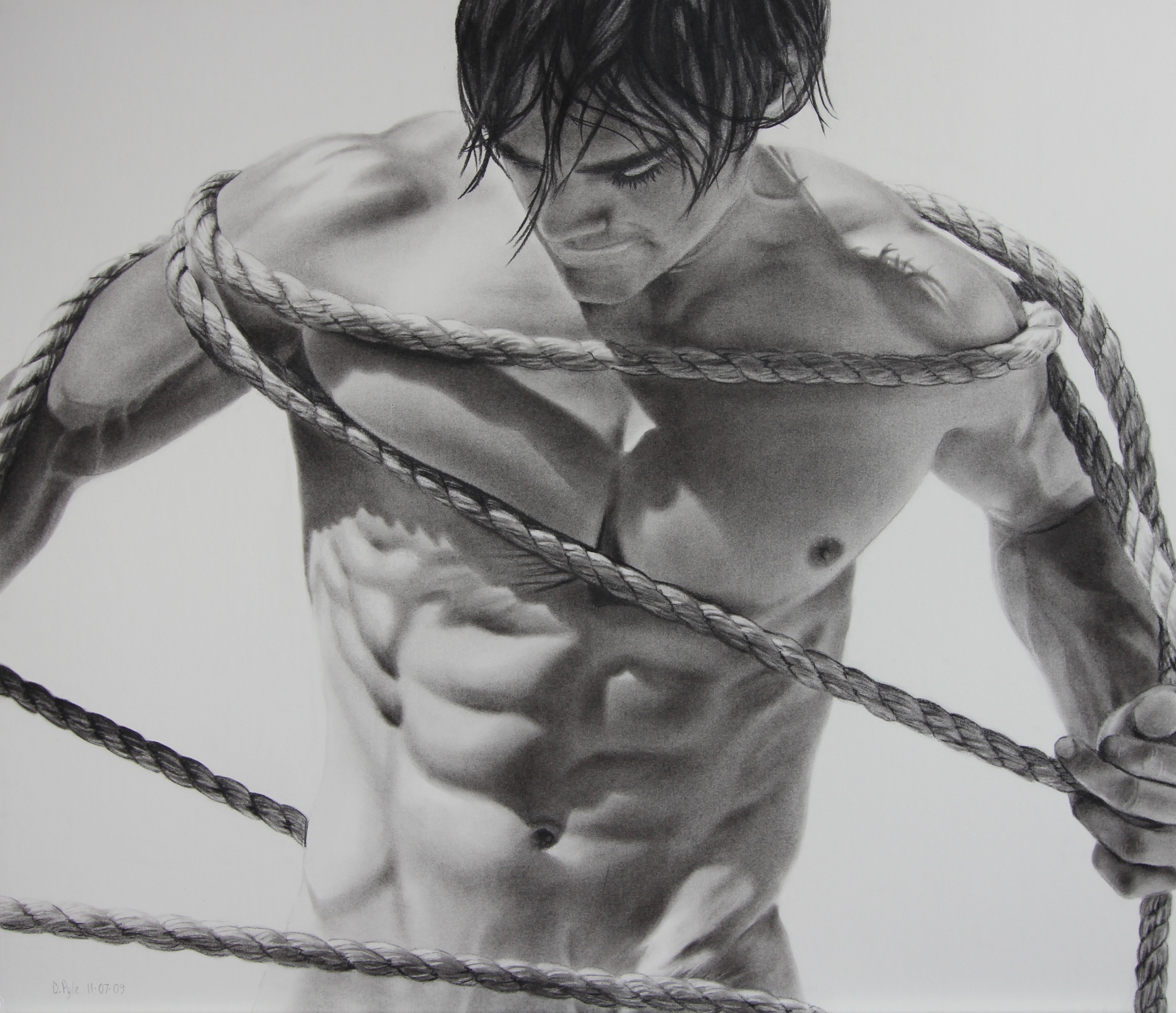
In Pursuit of Freedom (3) (2009)

== Honors and awards (selection) ==
- 2015 Still Point Art Quarterly – Chasing the Light (finding the shadow) – Best Drawing for "Shadows"
- 2014 American Art Awards – 1st place, Still Life category for "Weary Traveler"
- 2013 American Art Awards – 1st place, charcoal, for "In Pursuit Of Freedom"
- 2012 American Art Awards – tied 1st place for "Predicament" in charcoal category
- 2011 1st Prize winner –BBC– The Gulp Gulp 9000 BBC edition.

== Bibliography ==
- 2015 Art Exhibeo Magazine – Dan Pyle: Time for you and Time for me
- 2015 Still Point Art Quarterly – spring issue
- 2014 Artist Portfolio Magazine Issue 17, pages 55–56
- 2014 Important World Artists, Vol. 1
- 2014 Hidden Treasures Art Magazine, yearbook 2014
- 2014 Art of Man magazine #16 – interview 10 pages
- 2014 Drawing Magazine – spring issue – interview, 2nd prize winner
- 2013 Art to Art Palette Journal – "Simple is Beautiful", Portrait of Dan Pyle
- 2013 Artist Portfolio Magazine, anniversary issue 2 page spread
- 2013 Artist Portfolio Magazine, portraits issue, full-page feature
- 2013 Artist Portfolio Magazine, winter 2 page spread
- 2013 Still Point Arts Quarterly, 'Everyday Objects', Spring issue
- 2012 Strokes of Genius V: The Best of Drawing—releasing Oct. 2013
- 2012 Wisdom Crieth Without (magazine) – Nov./Dec. issue, full page
- 2012 Still Point Arts Quarterly, Summer 2012 Issue No. 6 – Still Point IV exhibition winners
- 2011 – International Dictionary of Artist – World Wide Art Books
- 2008 Scott Brassart, in: Bottom Line Magazine, April Vol. 27, Issue 16
