= KOKU =

Radio station in Hagåtña, Guam

Hit Radio 100 (KOKU)
- Hagåtña; Guam
- Broadcast area: Guam
- Frequency: 100.3 MHz
- Branding: Hit Radio 100

Programming
- Format: CHR

Ownership
- Owner: Moy(lan) Communications
- Sister stations: KMOY

History
- First air date: June 1, 1984

Technical information
- Licensing authority: FCC
- Class: C1
- ERP: 50,000 watts horizontal 49,700 watts vertical
- HAAT: 165 meters
- Transmitter coordinates: 13.489556°N 144.828861°E

Links
- Public license information: Public file; LMS
- Website: Hit Radio 100 Official Facebook

KOKU (100.3 FM) – branded as Hit Radio 100 – is a radio station licensed to Hagåtña, Guam. The station is currently owned by Moy Communications, Inc. and airs a contemporary hit radio format.

It is currently one of three CHR/Top 40 outlets on Guam, and one of two CHR outlets in the Guam market, competing against KNUT.

== History ==
KOKU, which signed on on June 1, 1984, has been launched a contemporary hit radio in its two incarnations, from 1984 to 2003 (it picked up the slogan in 1989, and was known as "Guam's Party station" until 2003, later renamed as "Guam's Bomb Station" until 2006), and as of 2016, when it changed the current slogan as "Guam #1 Hit Music Station."

As of October 2, 2012, KOKU has a new sister station as KMOY, which has adult top 40 as "Cool FM 92.7".

On May 26, 2023, Hit Radio 100 went off the air after Typhoon Mawar hit Guam. It went back on the air on June 2.
