= XHAGP-FM =

Radio station in Agua Prieta, Sonora

- Agua Prieta, Sonora; Mexico
- Frequency: 92.7 FM
- Branding: Radio Alcance, La Poderosa

Programming
- Format: Spanish Christian

Ownership
- Owner: Centro Evangelístico de Agua Prieta; (María de Lourdes Robeson Chávez)

History
- First air date: April 2017
- Call sign meaning: AGua Prieta

Technical information
- Licensing authority: CRT
- Class: A
- ERP: 2.07 kW
- HAAT: −38 m (−125 ft)
- Transmitter coordinates: 31°17′53.82″N 109°32′44.85″W

Links
- Webcast: www.alcancetv.com.mx/radio/

XHAGP-FM is a radio station on 92.7 FM in Agua Prieta, Sonora. XHAGP is owned by María de Lourdes Robeson Chávez on behalf of the Centro Evangelístico Agua Viva religious association and carries a Spanish Christian format known as Radio Alcance.

== History ==
XHAGP was approved for a concession in December 2016 and received it three months later. The station came to air by the end of April.

The concessionaire, María de Lourdes (Marilú) Robeson Chávez, is married to the pastor of the Centro Evangelístico, José Luis de la Torre.

Radio Alcance is the sister station to Alcance TV, a cable TV channel operated by the same religious association.
