= CHAR-FM =

Coordinates: 62°48′22″N 092°05′04″W

- Rankin Inlet, Nunavut, Canada; Canada
- Frequency: 92.7 MHz (FM)

Ownership
- Owner: James Sandy

Technical information
- Class: LP
- ERP: 21 watts vertical polarization only
- HAAT: 11 meters (36 ft)

CHAR-FM is a radio station that broadcasts on 92.7 FM in Rankin Inlet, Nunavut, Canada. The station is owned by James Sandy and Todd McKay.

The callsign CHAR-FM was used by a former radio station in Alert, Nunavut that operated on 105.9 FM, which was cancelled in 2007. It's uncertain when the current CHAR-FM began broadcasting in Rankin Inlet at 92.7 FM.
