= XHSAV-FM =

Radio station in San Andrés Tuxtla, Veracruz

San Andrés Tuxtla, Veracruz; Mexico
- Frequency: 92.7 FM
- Branding: La Primerísima

Programming
- Format: News/talk
- Affiliations: Radio Fórmula

Ownership
- Owner: La Primerísima, S.A. de C.V.

History
- First air date: June 13, 1991 (concession)
- Call sign meaning: San Andrés Tuxtla Veracruz

Technical information
- ERP: 49.98 kW
- Transmitter coordinates: 18°53′59″N 96°57′50″W

Links
- Website: laprimerisima.com.mx

XHSAV-FM is a radio station on 92.7 FM in San Andrés Tuxtla, Veracruz, Mexico, known as La Primerísima.

== History ==
XHSAV received its concession on June 13, 1991. It was owned by Mario Daniel Malpica Valverde and transferred to the current concessionaire in 2003.
