= XHVJP-FM =

Radio station in Xicotepec de Juárez, Puebla, Mexico

XHVJP-FM / XEVJP-AM
Xicotepec, Puebla; Mexico
- Frequency: 92.7 FM / 570 AM
- Branding: Radio Xicotepec

Ownership
- Owner: Radiodifusión de Xicotepec, S.A. de C.V.

History
- First air date: July 20, 1988 (concession)
- Call sign meaning: Villa Juárez, Puebla

Technical information
- ERP: 3 kW
- Transmitter coordinates: 20°15′47″N 97°57′24″W

Links
- Webcast: Listen live
- Website: radioxicotepec570am.com

XHVJP-FM/XEVJP-AM is a radio station on 92.7 FM and 570 AM in Xicotepec, Puebla, Mexico, known as Radio Xicotepec.

== History ==
XEVJP-AM 570 received its concession on July 20, 1988.

XEVJP was cleared to move to FM in 2011, but it was required to maintain its AM station, as communities could lose radio service were the AM station to go off the air.
