= XHPVTP-FM =

Radio station in Villa de Tamazulápam del Progreso, Oaxaca

- Villa de Tamazulápam del Progreso, Oaxaca; Mexico
- Frequency: 92.7 FM
- Branding: La Picosita

Programming
- Format: Regional Mexican

Ownership
- Owner: Servicios Inmobiliarios Tierra Mojada, S.A. de C.V.

History
- First air date: 2017
- Call sign meaning: Villa de Tamazulápam del Progreso

Technical information
- Class: A

Links
- Website: XHPVTP-FM on Facebook

XHPVTP-FM is a radio station on 92.7 FM in Villa de Tamazulápam del Progreso, Oaxaca. It is owned by Servicios Inmobiliarios Tierra Mojada and known as La Picosita, carrying a Regional Mexican format.

== History ==
XHPVTP was awarded in the IFT-4 radio auction of 2017. The station officially signed on the air by October, becoming the town's first licensed commercial station. The only other station in town is a CORTV network repeater.
