= CJVN-FM =

Christian radio station in Ottawa, Ontario, Canada

Coordinates: 45°26′12.84″N 75°39′29.16″W

- Ottawa, Ontario; Canada
- Frequency: 92.7 MHz
- Branding: Radio Vie Nouvelle

Programming
- Language: French
- Format: Christian radio

Ownership
- Owner: M Fiston Kalambay Mutombo

History
- First air date: 2015

Technical information
- Class: LP
- ERP: 50 watts vertical polarization only
- HAAT: 41 metres (135 ft)

Links
- Website: fmradiovienouvelle.com

CJVN-FM is a low-powered French-language radio station, which broadcasts a Christian radio format on the frequency of 92.7 MHz (FM) in Ottawa, Ontario, Canada. The station is owned by Fiston Kalambay on behalf of a not for-profit corporation to be incorporated, and received approval from the CRTC on July 22, 2014. The station is licensed to broadcast with an effective radiated power of 50 watts (non-directional antenna with an effective height of antenna above average terrain of 41 metres). The signal began testing on April 17, 2015.
