= Charcoal (art) =

Form of dry art medium

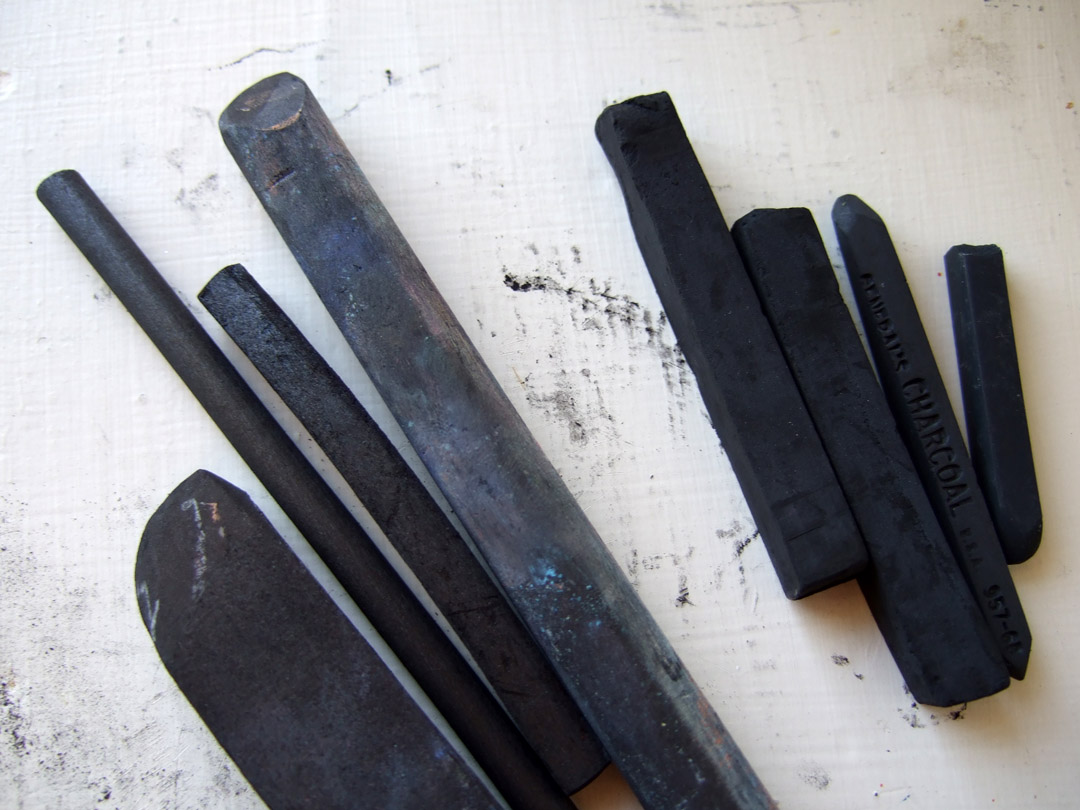
4 vine charcoal sticks and 4 compressed charcoal sticks.

Artists' charcoal is charcoal used as a dry art medium. Both compressed charcoal (held together by a gum or wax binder) and charcoal sticks (wooden sticks burned in a kiln without air) are used. The marks it leaves behind on paper are much less permanent than with other media such as graphite, and so lines can easily be erased and blended. Charcoal can produce lines that are very light or intensely black. The dry medium can be applied to almost any surface from smooth to very coarse. Fixatives are used with charcoal drawings to solidify the position to prevent erasing or rubbing off of charcoal dusts.

The method used to create artists' charcoal is similar to that employed in other fields, such as producing gunpowder and cooking fuel. The type of wood material and preparation method allow a variety of charcoal types and textures to be produced.

== Types ==
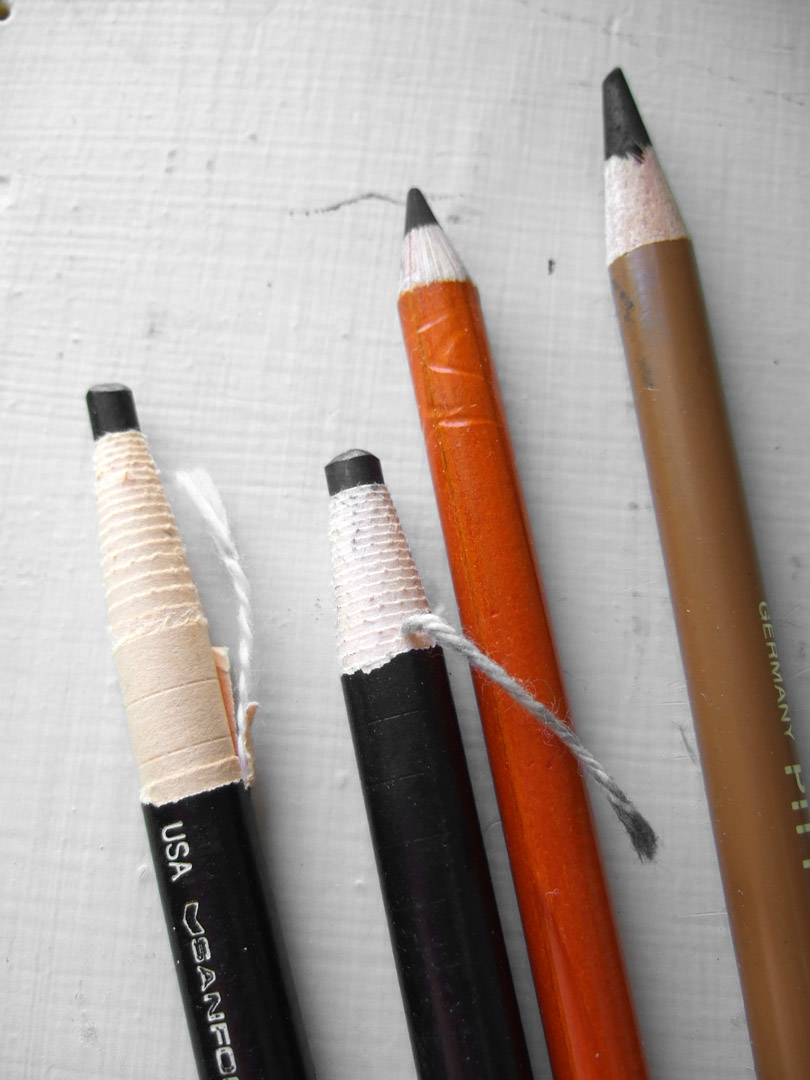
A selection of charcoal pencils

There are various types and uses of charcoal as an art medium, but the commonly used types are: Compressed, Vine, and Pencil.

Vine charcoal is a long and thin charcoal stick that is the result of burning grape vines in a kiln without air. It comes in shades of gray.

Willow charcoal is a long and thin charcoal stick that is the result of burning willow sticks in a kiln without air. It is darker in color than vine charcoal.

The removable properties of willow and vine charcoal, through dusting and erasing, are favored by artists for making preliminary sketches or basic compositions. This also makes such charcoal less suitable for creating detailed images.

Compressed charcoal (also referred as charcoal sticks) is shaped into a block or a stick. Intensity of the shade is determined by hardness. The amount of gum or wax binders used during the production process affects the hardness, softer producing intensely black markings while firmer leaves light markings.

Charcoal pencils consist of compressed charcoal enclosed in a jacket of wood. Designed to be similar to graphite pencils while maintaining most of the properties of charcoal, they are often used for fine and crisp detailed drawings, while keeping the user's hand from being marked.

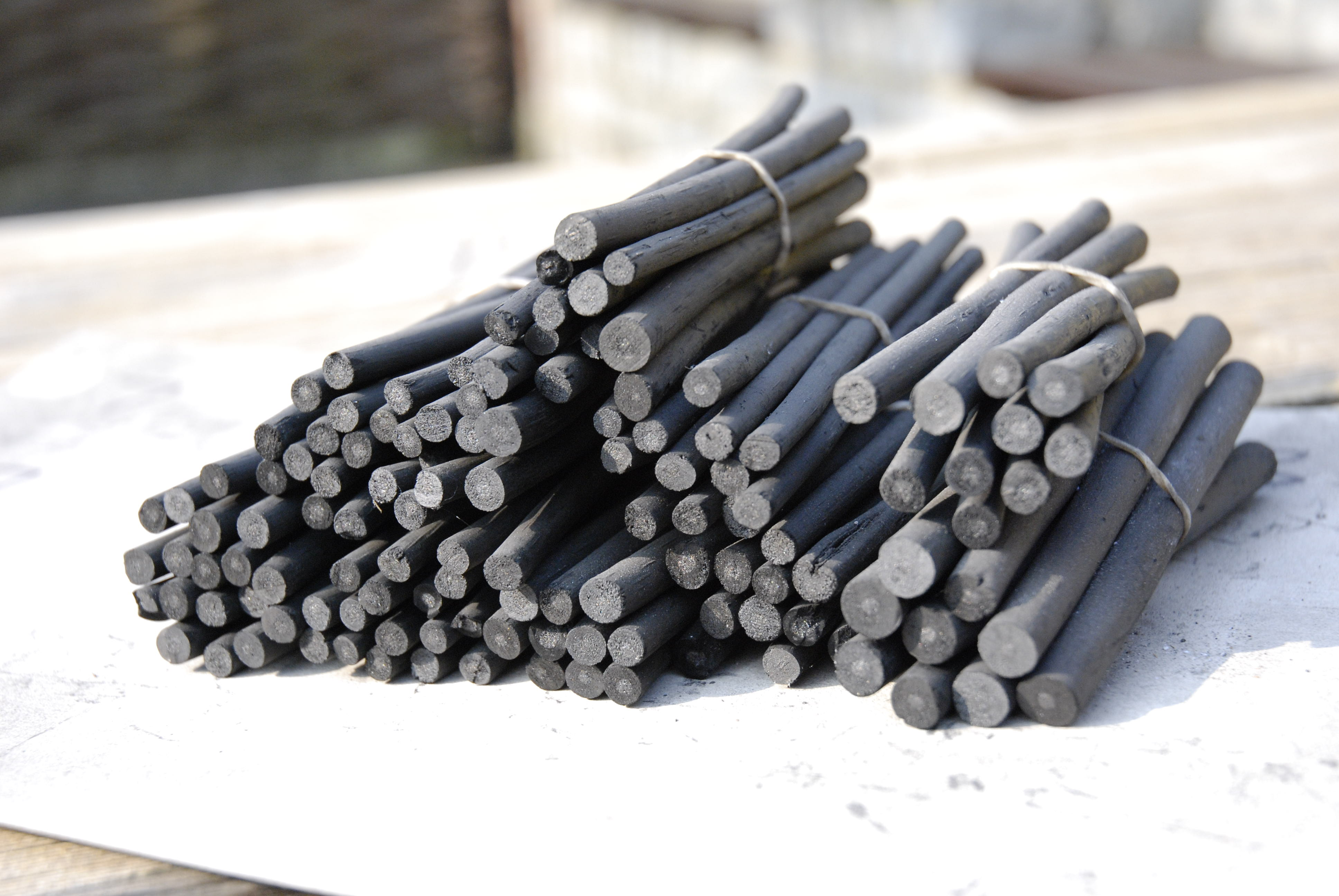
Carbonized sticks of European spindlewood

Other types of artists' charcoal such as charcoal crayons were developed during the 19th century and used by caricaturists. Charcoal powders are used to create patterns and pouncing, a transferring method of patterns from one surface to another.

There are wide variations in artists' charcoal, depending on the proportion of ingredients: compressed charcoal from burned birch, clay, lamp black pigment, and a small quantity of ultramarine. The longer this mixture is heated, the softer it becomes.

== Art techniques ==
Paper used with artists' charcoal can vary in quality. Rough texture may allow more charcoal to adhere to the paper. The use of toned paper allows different possibilities as white pastels (commonly referred to by the brand name Conté) can be used in combination with charcoal to create contrast.

=== Hatching ===
Hatching is a method in which thin, dark lines are continuously placed parallel to each-other. When done with charcoal, it comes out smoother and darker.

=== Rubbing ===
Rubbing is done by pressing a sheet of paper against a targeted surface, then rubbing charcoal against the paper to create an image of the texture of the surface.

=== Blending ===
Blending is done to create smooth transitions between darker and lighter areas of a drawing. It can also create a shadow effect. Two common methods of blending are, using a finger to rub or spread charcoal which has been applied to the paper or the use of paper blending stumps also called a Tortillon. Many prefer to use a chamois, which is a soft square piece of leather.

=== Lifting (erasing) ===
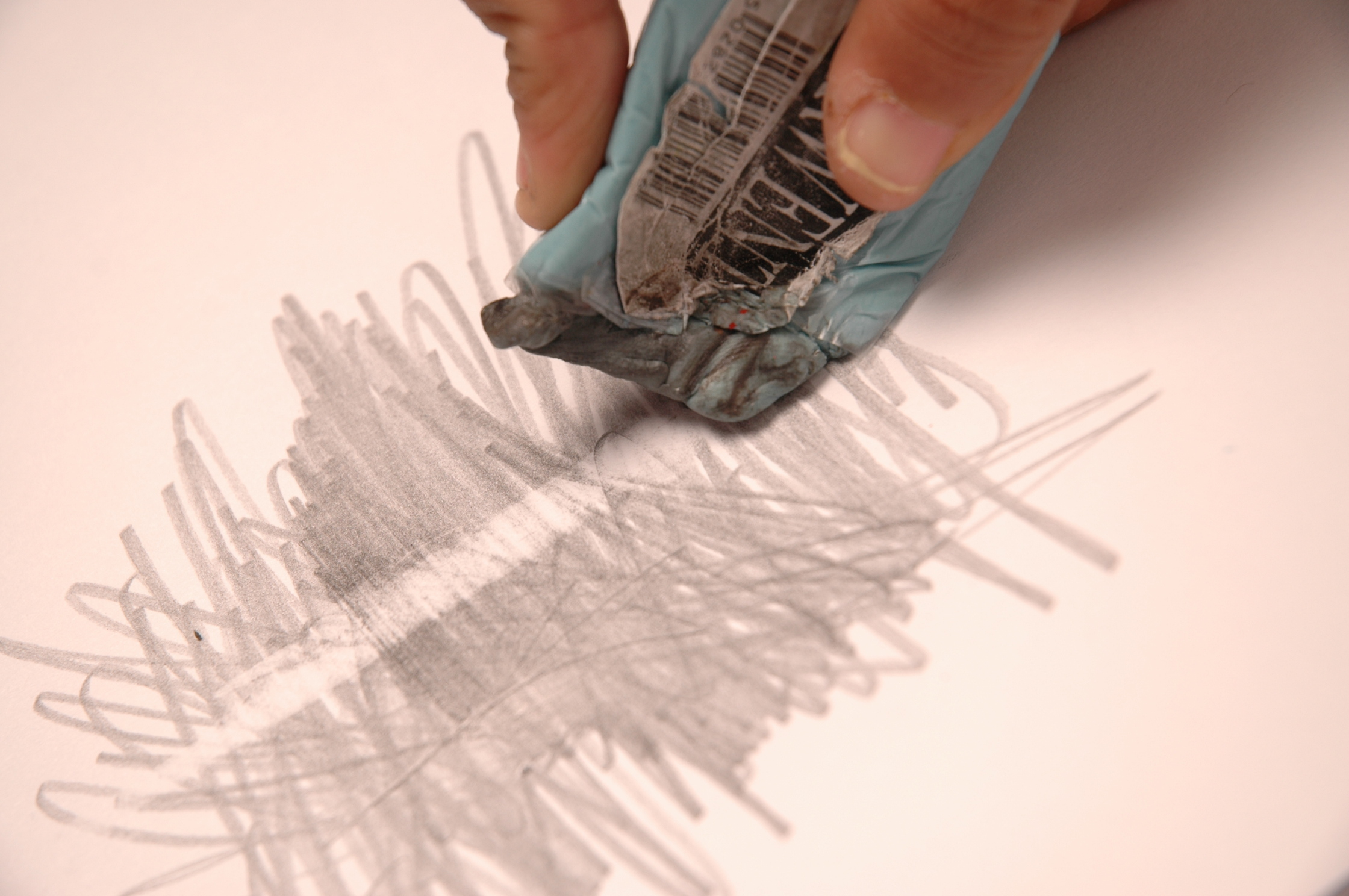
Kneaded eraser

Erasing is often performed with a kneaded rubber eraser. This is a malleable eraser that is often claimed to be self-cleaning. It can be shaped by kneading it softly with hands, into tips for smaller areas or flipped inside out to clean. Other erasing tools that are often used with charcoal are electrical erasers and pencil erasers.

== History ==
Charcoal was often a key component of cave painting, with examples dating back to at least 28,000 years ago.

One of the oldest charcoal paintings is a picture of a zebra, found at the Apollo cave in Namibia.

In the Renaissance, charcoal was widely used, but few works of art survived due to charcoal particles flaking off the canvas. At the end of the 15th century, a process of submerging the drawings in a gum bath was implemented to prevent the charcoal from flaking away. Charcoal paintings date as far back as ca.23,000 BC. Since then, many cultures have utilized charcoal for art, camouflage, and in rites of passage. Many indigenous people from Australia, parts of Africa, Pacific Islands, parts of Asia, and others still practice body painting for rites of passage including child birth, weddings, spiritual rituals, war, hunting, and funerary rites. Many artists use charcoal because of its unique dark black strokes. The weak structure of charcoal causes the material to flake off onto the canvas.

Throughout western art history, artists well known for other mediums have used charcoal for sketching or preliminary studies for final paintings. Examples of contemporary artists using charcoal as a primary medium are Robert Longo, William Kentridge, Dan Pyle and Joel Daniel Phillips.

== Gallery ==
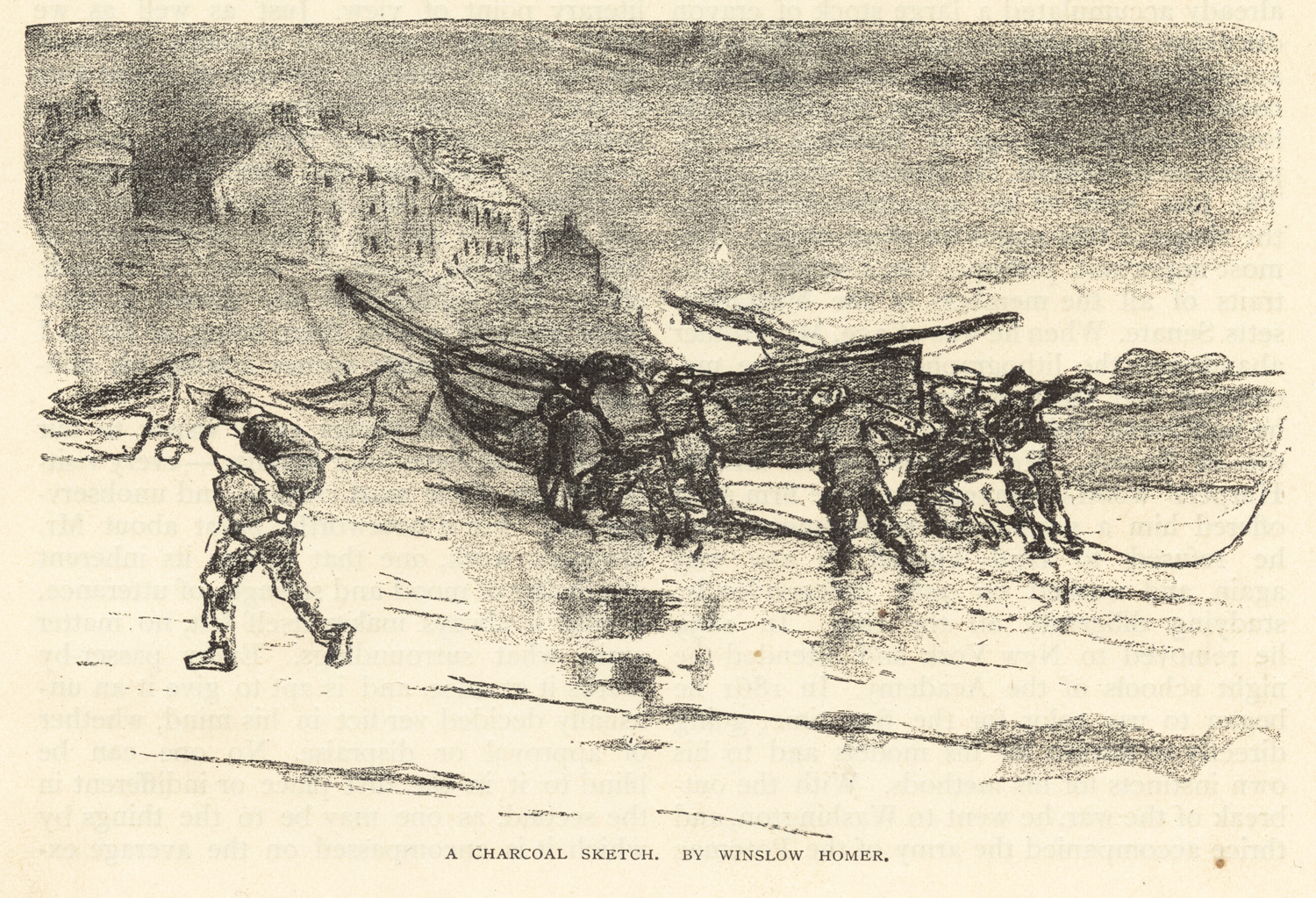
A charcoal sketch by Winslow Homer, 1883, Boston Public Library

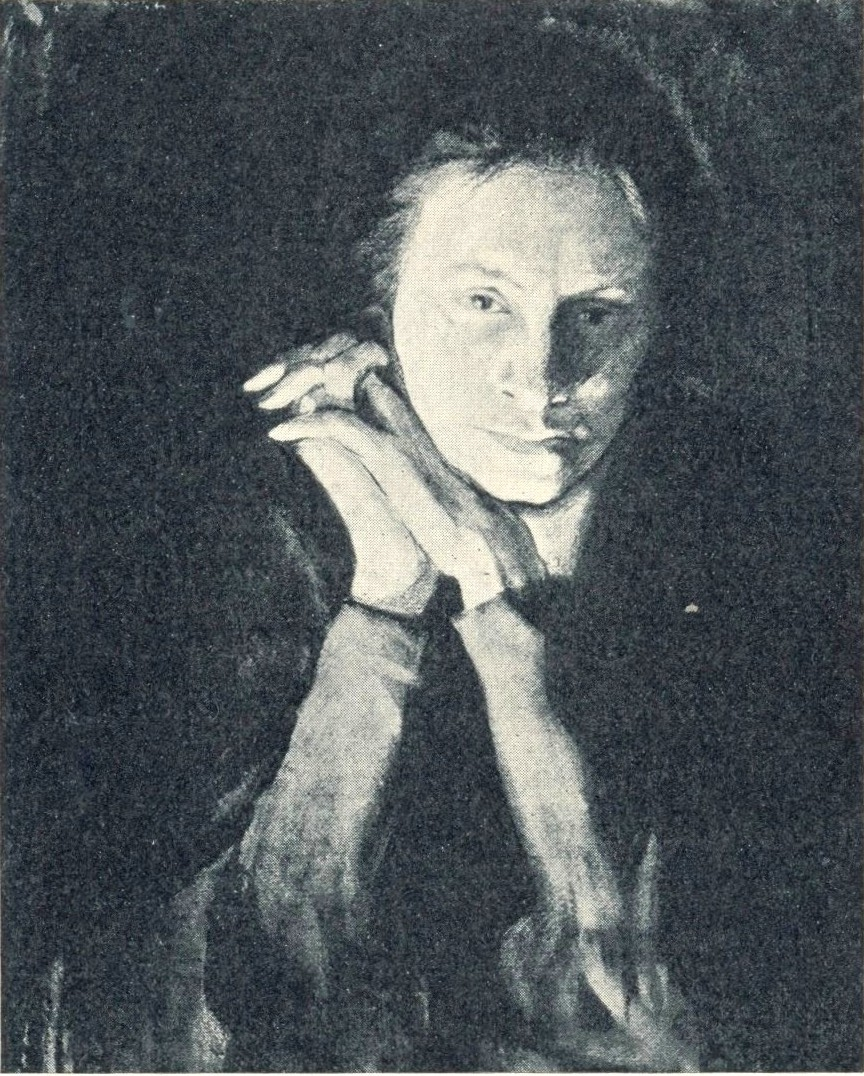
Charcoal drawing by Henryk Grombecki (Polish painter, 1883-1933 - Portrait of Artist's Wife, of 1906)

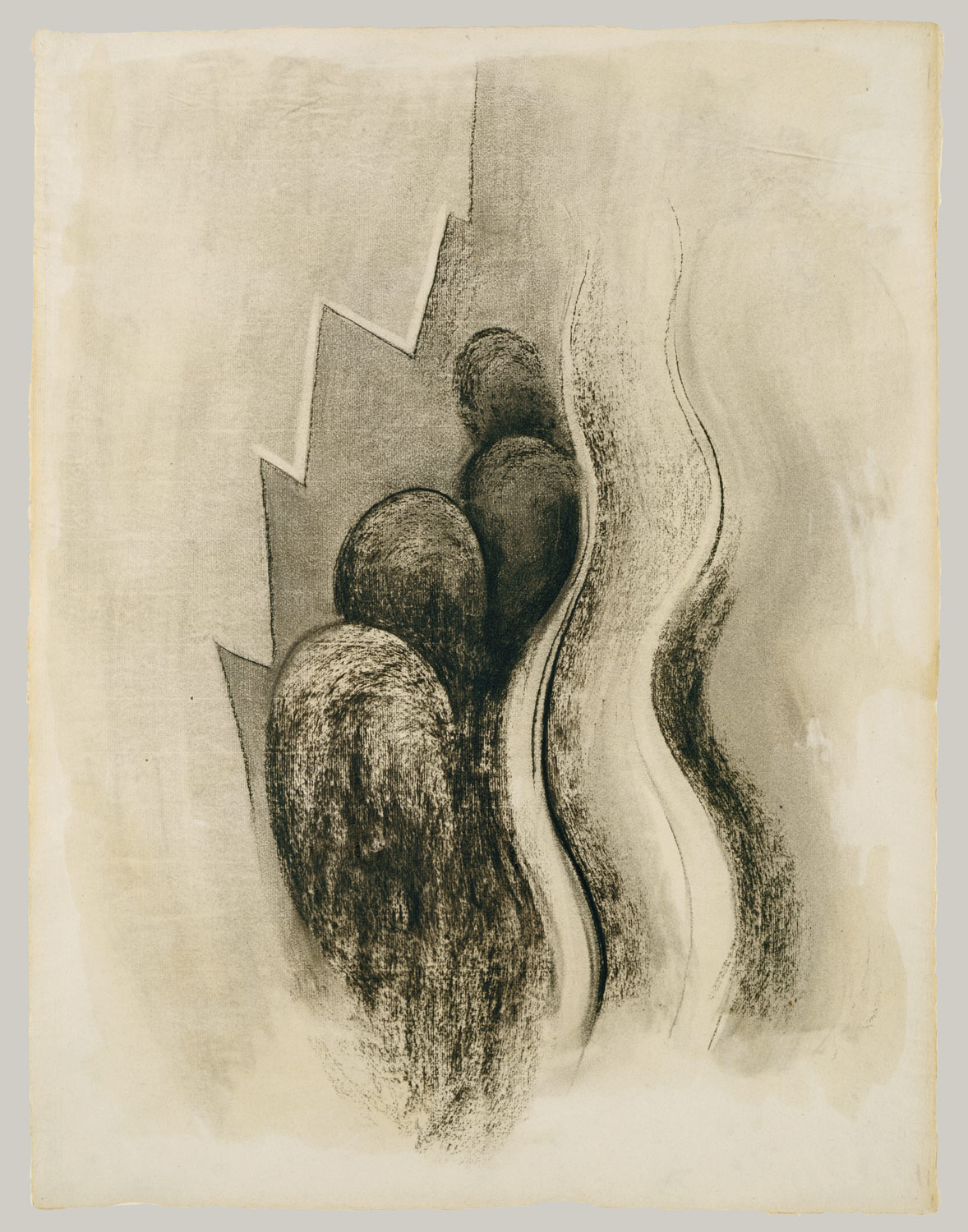
Drawing XIII by Georgia O'Keeffe, 1915, Metropolitan Museum of Art

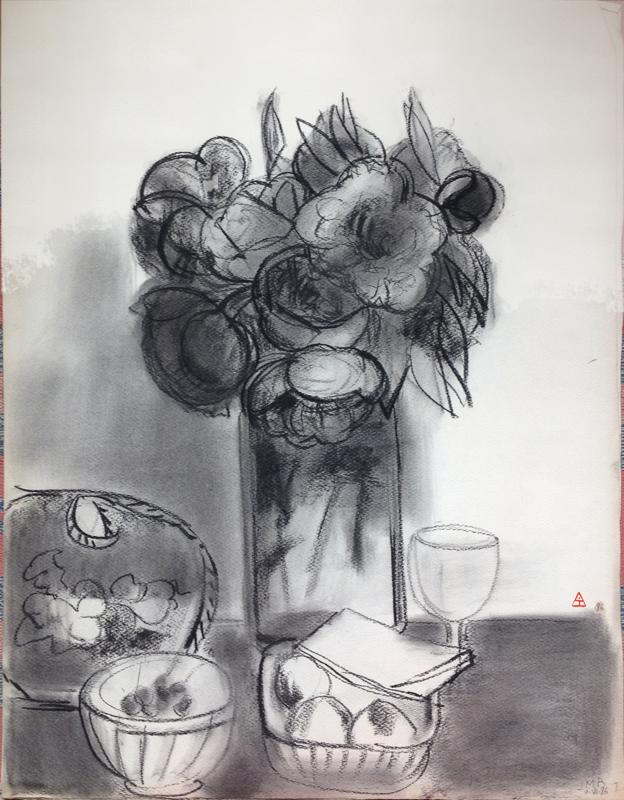
Pivoines by Jean-Max Albert 1989

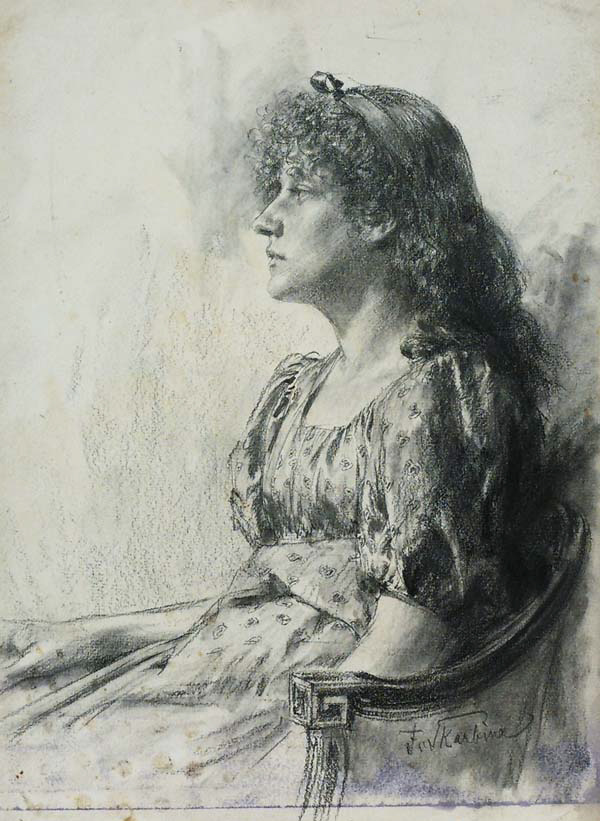
Portrait of a young woman by Franz Skarbina, 1910

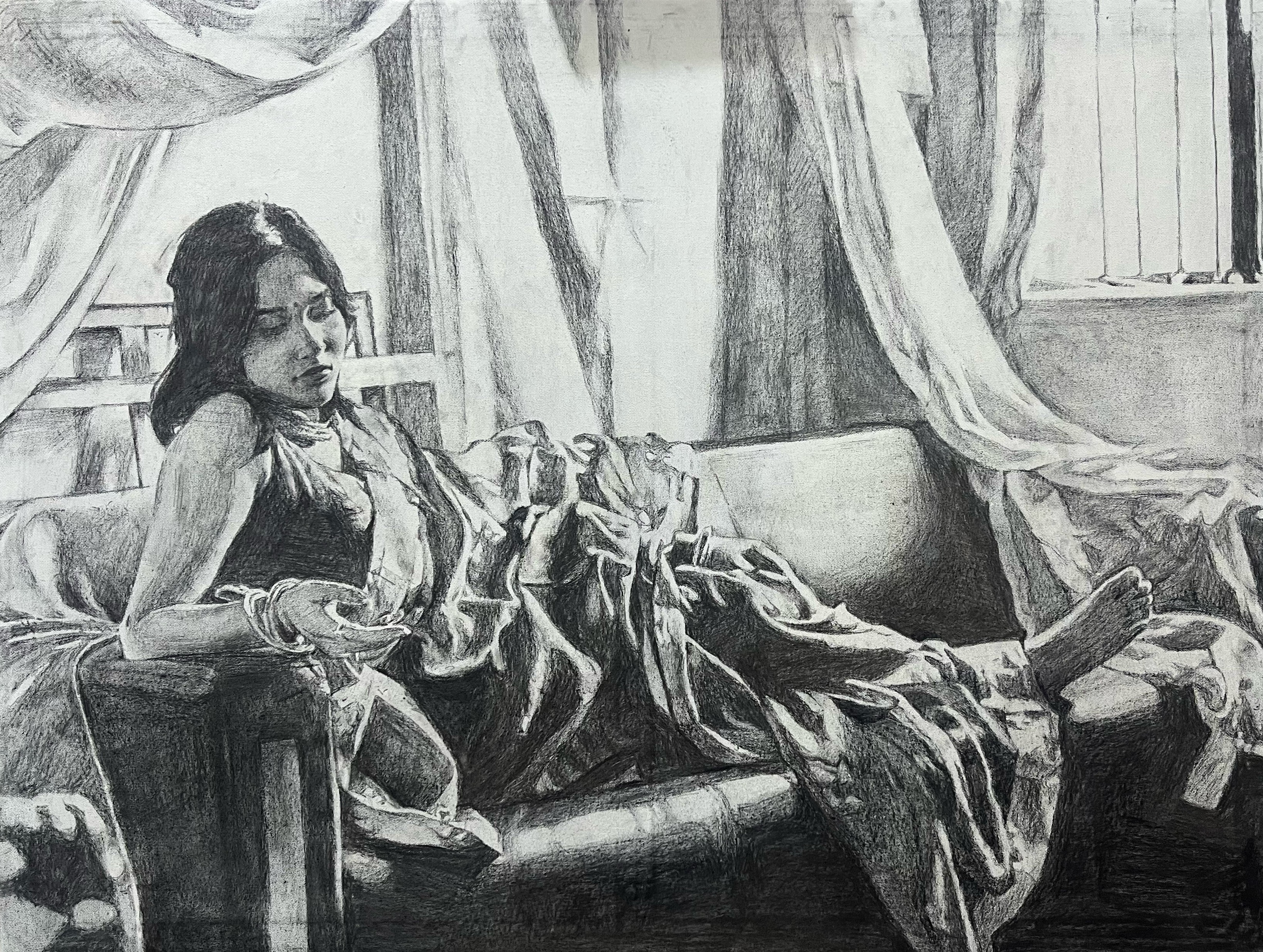
A charcoal sketch of a woman by Mehul Garg, an Indian artist, 2025
