= XHXE-FM =

Radio station in Querétaro, Querétaro, Mexico

- Querétaro, Querétaro; Mexico
- Frequency: 92.7 FM
- Branding: La Mejor

Programming
- Format: Regional Mexican
- Affiliations: MVS Radio

Ownership
- Owner: Estela Leticia Jacqueline Caballero Ávila (93.3%); (Radio XEXE, S.A. de C.V.)
- Operator: Corporación Multimundo
- Sister stations: XHOE-FM

History
- First air date: November 13, 1964 (concession)

Technical information
- Class: AA
- ERP: 6 kW
- HAAT: 43.89 meters (144.0 ft)
- Transmitter coordinates: 20°34′57″N 100°25′55″W

Links
- Webcast: Listen live
- Website: lamejor.com.mx

XHXE-FM is a radio station on 92.7 FM in Querétaro, Querétaro, Mexico. It carries the La Mejor national regional Mexican format from MVS Radio.

== History ==
XEXE-AM 1490 came to air in 1966, known as "Radio Hits" and affiliated to the then-new Grupo ACIR. Two years earlier, in November 1964, the concession had been awarded to María Gloria Leticia Ávila y Vizcarra. The station, operated by Carlos Caballero, was the fourth in the city and carried a wide-ranging music format, plus one of Querétaro's earliest radio newscasts.

After a brief stint as Radio Capital from 1978 to 1980, ACIR returned to XEXE in 1980. The station took on the name of "XEXE Radio ACIR 1490" and began broadcasting 24 hours a day.

XEXE broke from Grupo ACIR in 1989, moved its studio and transmitter to new facilities, and became known as "Radio Hit 1490 AM". The station pioneered live broadcasts of lucha libre from the Arena Querétaro. In 1994, the station increased its power to 2.5 kW, and on February 25, 1995, the station moved down the dial to 1090 AM and picked up a grupera format.

In 1997, the station was leased again and became Radio Fórmula's outlet in Querétaro. In May 2011, the FM station launched.

On October 1, 2012, the station broke from Radio Fórmula and became known as Integra 92siete. On October 1, 2016, it became Kiss FM as part of a marketing agreement with Multimundo, which took over operations from Integra, the group run by the Caballero Ávila family.

Kiss FM flipped to grupera as La Mejor on September 1, 2020.
