= KMOY =

Radio station in Hagåtña, Guam

Cool FM (KMOY)
- Hagåtña, Guam; Guam
- Broadcast area: Guam
- Frequency: 92.7 MHz
- Branding: Cool FM 92.7

Programming
- Format: Adult Top 40

Ownership
- Owner: Moylan Communications
- Sister stations: KOKU

History
- First air date: October 2, 2012
- Call sign meaning: Moylan Insurance, the parent company of Moylan Communications

Technical information
- Licensing authority: FCC
- Class: C1
- ERP: 42,000 watts
- HAAT: 165 meters
- Transmitter coordinates: 13.489556°N 144.828861°E

Links
- Public license information: Public file; LMS
- Website: Cool FM Official Website

KMOY (92.7 FM) – branded as Cool FM 92.7 – is a commercial Adult Top 40 radio station licensed to Hagåtña, Guam. It is owned and operated by Moylan Communications Inc. It signed on the air on October 2, 2012, as the sister station to KOKU.
