= WGTC-LP =

- Mayhew, Mississippi; United States
- Frequency: 92.7 MHz
- Branding: WGTC Radio

Programming
- Format: Top 40

Ownership
- Owner: East Mississippi Community College

Technical information
- Licensing authority: FCC
- Facility ID: 195049
- Class: L1
- ERP: 100 watts
- HAAT: 28 metres (92 ft)
- Transmitter coordinates: 33°28′37.3″N 88°38′22.2″W

Links
- Public license information: LMS
- Webcast: Listen Live
- Website: Official Website

WGTC-LP (92.7 FM) is a radio station licensed to serve the community of Mayhew, Mississippi. The station is owned by East Mississippi Community College, and airs a top 40 format.

The station was assigned the WGTC-LP call letters by the Federal Communications Commission on December 30, 2014.
