= WBNK =

Coordinates: 34.884°N 76.506°W

- Pine Knoll Shores, North Carolina; United States
- Broadcast area: New Bern, Havelock, Morehead City
- Frequency: 92.7 (MHz)
- Branding: K-Love

Programming
- Format: Contemporary Christian
- Affiliations: K-Love

Ownership
- Owner: Educational Media Foundation; (Empowered Broadcasting Company)

Technical information
- Facility ID: 170178
- Class: C2
- ERP: 11,500 watts
- HAAT: 228 meters (748 ft)

WBNK (92.7 MHz) is an FM Contemporary Christian radio station located in Pine Knoll Shores, North Carolina and serving the New Bern/Morehead City region of Coastal North Carolina.

Before Lanser Broadcasting agreed to buy WBNK for $275,000 in 2015, it was an affiliate of the Christian Hit Radio Satellite Network (CHRSN).

On December 24, 2015, after being silent since its sale, the station returned to the air as 92.7 The Beacon, a Christian contemporary format, adding a local morning show.

In March 2018, the station was sold to the Educational Media Foundation for $100,000, and the station affiliated with its Christian music network K-Love. EMF's acquisition of WBNK was consummated on June 22, 2018.
