= WRAQ-LP =

- Angelica, New York; United States
- Frequency: 92.7 MHz
- Branding: WRAQ 92.7 FM

Programming
- Format: Community radio
- Affiliations: Pacifica Radio Network

Ownership
- Owner: Angelica Community Radio Inc

History
- Call sign meaning: "Radio Angelica"

Technical information
- Licensing authority: FCC
- Facility ID: 192265
- Class: L1
- ERP: 100 watts
- HAAT: −2 meters (−6.6 ft)
- Transmitter coordinates: 42°18′56.2″N 78°1′37″W

Links
- Public license information: LMS
- Webcast: Listen live
- Website: wraq.org/index.html

WRAQ-LP (92.7 FM) is a radio station licensed to serve the community of Angelica, New York. The station is owned by Angelica Community Radio Inc. It airs a community radio format. It is the only noncommercial radio station to originate programming from within Allegany County; its broadcasters are nicknamed the "Radio Dogs."

The station was assigned the WRAQ-LP call letters by the Federal Communications Commission on February 26, 2014. It began broadcasting regularly on the FM signal in 2016, a year after beginning streaming its programs on the Internet.

WRAQ participates in the annual Thanksgiving tradition of playing "Alice's Restaurant;" unusually for stations that participate in the tradition, it airs the song the day before Thanksgiving instead of the traditional Thanksgiving Day itself.
