= KHKY (FM) =

- Akiachak, Alaska; United States
- Frequency: 92.7 MHz
- Branding: Husky Radio

Programming
- Format: Variety

Ownership
- Owner: Yupiit School District

History
- Founded: October 11, 2007
- First air date: April 6, 2015
- Former call signs: KHKY (2007–2014); DKHKY (2014–2015); KHKY (2015–Present)
- Call sign meaning: "Husky"

Technical information
- Licensing authority: FCC
- Facility ID: 198504
- Class: D
- Power: 50 Watts
- HAAT: 15 meters (49 ft)
- Transmitter coordinates: 60°54′35.60″N 161°25′56.60″W

Links
- Public license information: Public file; LMS

KHKY is a Variety formatted broadcast radio station licensed to and serving Akiachak, Alaska. KHKY is owned and operated by Yupiit School District.

== First launch ==
The Yupiit School District was granted a construction permit by the Federal Communications Commission (FCC) on August 22, 2007, to begin building the station that would become KHKY. The new station was given the KHKY callsign eight days later on August 30. KHKY began broadcasting for the first time on October 11, 2007.

The school district failed to file for a renewal of their license by the October 1, 2013 deadline. The station's license was cancelled on February 1, 2014, after the district failed to file for a renewal. The KHKY callsign was deleted the same day.

Members of the Ahiachak School wrote to the FCC on November 28, 2014, asking them to reconsider the cancellation of the station's license. The authors of the letter blamed the school's former principal for being "uninvolved with the radio station" and "neglect[ing] to renew the license in a timely manner". Alaska State Representative Bryce Edgmon (D, 37th) also wrote the FCC asking the commission to reconsider its decision.

The school district filed a formal Petition for Reconsideration on December 5, 2014.

== Second launch ==
The school district began the process to bring KHKY back on the air on March 23, 2015, by reapplying for a construction permit. The new station would use the previously built tower to return to the air.

The station was reissued the KHKY callsign on April 3, 2015. Three days later, the station returned to the airwaves. The station's Petition for Reconsideration was dismissed as moot the same day.
