= KQAY-FM =

- Tucumcari, New Mexico; United States
- Frequency: 92.7 MHz
- Branding: Greatest Hits 92.7

Programming
- Format: Classic hits

Ownership
- Owner: Ingalls Holdings, LLC

History
- First air date: 1968

Technical information
- Licensing authority: FCC
- Facility ID: 54167
- Class: A
- ERP: 3,000 watts
- HAAT: 125.5 meters (412 ft)
- Transmitter coordinates: 35°8′23″N 103°44′35″W

Links
- Public license information: Public file; LMS

KQAY-FM (92.7 FM) is a radio station licensed to Tucumcari, New Mexico, United States. The station is currently owned by Ingalls Holdings, LLC.
