= KJVC =

Radio station in Mansfield, Louisiana

Coordinates: 32°01′18″N 93°44′18″W

- Mansfield, Louisiana; United States
- Broadcast area: DeSoto Parish–Shreveport–Bossier City
- Frequency: 92.7 MHz
- Branding: "92.7 KJVC"

Programming
- Language: English
- Format: Classic country
- Affiliations: Fox News Radio; Louisiana Radio Network

Ownership
- Owner: Sputnik Media, LLC; (Sputnik Radio, LLC)

Technical information
- Licensing authority: FCC
- Facility ID: 26617
- Class: A
- ERP: 3,000 watts
- HAAT: 91 meters (299 ft)

Links
- Public license information: Public file; LMS
- Webcast: Live Stream

KJVC (92.7 FM) is a commercial radio station airing a classic country format. Owned and operated through licensee Sputnik Media, LLC, the facility is licensed to Mansfield, and serves DeSoto Parish and the Shreveport–Bossier City metropolitan area.
