= WKKZ =

- Dublin, Georgia; United States
- Frequency: 92.7 MHz

Programming
- Format: Modern Adult Contemporary

Ownership
- Owner: Kirby Broadcasting Company

History
- Former call signs: WXLI (1978–1980)

Technical information
- Licensing authority: FCC
- Facility ID: 34942
- Class: C2
- ERP: 50,000 watts
- HAAT: 127.0 meters
- Transmitter coordinates: 32°31′21.00″N 82°54′0.00″W

Links
- Public license information: Public file; LMS
- Website: wkkz927.com

WKKZ (92.7 FM) is a radio station broadcasting a modern adult contemporary format, and licensed to Dublin, Georgia, United States. The station is currently owned by Kirby Broadcasting Company.

== History ==
The station went on the air as WXLI on December 1, 1978. On March 3, 1980, the station changed its call sign to the current WKKZ. Currently Jeff Kidd and Mike 'Cannonball' Alligood present the morning show and broadcast weekdays from 6am-9am live.
