= WDMZ-LP =

- Benton, Kentucky; United States
- Broadcast area: Benton, Kentucky and the immediate surrounding areas
- Frequency: 92.7 MHz
- Branding: WDMZ 92.7 FM

Programming
- Format: Variety

Ownership
- Owner: Falcon Communications Corp.

History
- First air date: 2016

Technical information
- Licensing authority: FCC
- Facility ID: 191651
- Class: L1
- ERP: 28 watts
- HAAT: 49.04 meters (161 feet)
- Transmitter coordinates: 36° 49' 17" N, 88° 22' 35" W

Links
- Public license information: LMS
- Webcast: Listen Live

WDMZ-LP is a low powered FM radio station broadcasting at 92.7 MHz. Licensed to Benton, Kentucky, United States, WDMZ-LP broadcasts a variety format, and is owned by Falcon Communications Corp.
