= KVCK (AM) =

- Wolf Point, Montana; United States
- Frequency: 1450 kHz
- Branding: Classic Hits 1450

Programming
- Format: Classic hits
- Affiliations: ABC Radio

Ownership
- Owner: WolfTrax Broadcasting, LLC
- Sister stations: KVCK-FM

History
- First air date: 1957-09-01 (at 1490 kHz)
- Former call signs: KVCK (1957–1989); KTYZ (1989–1992)

Technical information
- Licensing authority: FCC
- Facility ID: 73385
- Class: C
- Power: 1,000 watts unlimited
- Transmitter coordinates: 48°05′18″N 105°39′22″W

Links
- Public license information: Public file; LMS
- Website: kvckradio.com

KVCK (1450 AM) is a radio station broadcasting a classic hits format to the Wolf Point, Montana, United States, area. The station is owned by WolfTrax Broadcasting, LLC, and features programming from ABC Radio.

== History ==
The station went on the air on 1957-09-01 and celebrated its 50th anniversary in 2007. The call letters represent the first initial of the last name of three original owners. The letter 'V' representing Mike Vukelich, 'C' representing Pete Coffey, and the 'K' representing Ed Krebsbach.

== Ownership ==
In April 2007, KVCK was acquired by WolfTrax Broadcasting from Wolf Town Wireless Inc.
