= KHWR-LP =

- McAlester, Oklahoma; United States
- Frequency: 92.7 MHz

Programming
- Format: Religious Teaching

Ownership
- Owner: Flames Of Truth Crusades

History
- First air date: 2017

Technical information
- Licensing authority: FCC
- Facility ID: 192977
- Class: LP1
- ERP: 26 watts
- HAAT: 57.8 meters (190 ft)
- Transmitter coordinates: 34°51′10″N 95°47′48″W

Links
- Public license information: LMS

KHWR-LP (92.7 FM) is a low-power FM radio station licensed to McAlester, Oklahoma, United States. The station is currently owned by Flames Of Truth Crusades.

== History ==
The station was assigned the call sign KHWR on February 17, 2014.
