= KISY =

Radio station in Blossom, Texas

- Blossom, Texas; United States
- Broadcast area: Paris, Texas
- Frequency: 92.7 MHz
- Branding: 92.7 KISS FM

Programming
- Format: Top 40/CHR

Ownership
- Owner: Tracy McCutchen

History
- First air date: 2015
- Call sign meaning: KISS FM Y

Technical information
- Licensing authority: FCC
- Facility ID: 189551
- Class: C2
- ERP: 29,000 watts
- HAAT: 106.7 meters
- Transmitter coordinates: 33°38′46.00″N 95°31′35.00″W

Links
- Public license information: Public file; LMS

KISY (92.7 FM, "Kiss FM") is a radio station broadcasting a top 40/CHR music format. Licensed to Blossom, Texas, United States, the station serves the Paris, Texas area. The station is owned by Tracy McCutchen.
