= WSWE-LP =

- Sweet Briar, Virginia; United States
- Broadcast area: Sweet Briar, Virginia; Amherst, Virginia
- Frequency: 92.7 MHz
- Branding: 92.7 The Briar

Programming
- Format: Adult album alternative

Ownership
- Owner: Sweet Briar College

History
- First air date: November 6, 2014
- Call sign meaning: Sweet Briar

Technical information
- Licensing authority: FCC
- Facility ID: 192461
- Class: L1
- ERP: 100 watts
- HAAT: 19.8 meters (65 ft)
- Transmitter coordinates: 37°33′24.0″N 79°4′53.0″W

Links
- Public license information: LMS
- Webcast: Listen live
- Website: briar927.com

WSWE-LP is an Adult Album Alternative formatted broadcast radio station licensed to Sweet Briar, Virginia, serving Sweet Briar and Amherst in Virginia. WSWE-LP is owned and operated by Sweet Briar College.
