= WHVE =

- Russell Springs, Kentucky; United States
- Broadcast area: Jamestown/Russell Springs; Lake Cumberland area Somerset, Kentucky; Columbia, Kentucky
- Frequency: 92.7 MHz
- Branding: 92.7 the Wave

Programming
- Format: Classic hits
- Affiliations: ABC News Radio; Kentucky News Network

Ownership
- Owner: Shoreline Communications, Inc.

History
- First air date: 1993; 33 years ago (as WTCO-FM)
- Former call signs: WQEG (1991–1992, CP); WTCO-FM (1992–1995)

Technical information
- Facility ID: 26639
- Class: A
- ERP: 6,000 watts
- HAAT: 100 meters
- Transmitter coordinates: 37°04′40″N 85°10′28″W

Links
- Webcast: listen live
- Website: ridingthewave.com

WHVE (92.7 FM, "92.7 The Wave") is a radio station broadcasting a classic hits format. Licensed to Russell Springs, Kentucky, United States, the station is currently owned by Shoreline Communications, Inc.

== History ==
The station's construction permit was granted by the FCC on November 22, 1991, under the callsign of WQEG. The station's callsign was changed to WTCO-FM on November 13, 1992, two months after it was acquired by Heartland Communications on September 4.

The station finally took to the air sometime in 1993. The station's callsign was changed once more, to its current WHVE on July 1, 1995, just after it was acquired by its current owner, Shoreline Communications.

It first broadcast a hot country format upon signing on. The station switched to an Adult contemporary format sometime in 1998–99, and was later switched to Classic Hits.
