= KQHE =

Fairbanks, Alaska; United States
- Frequency: 92.7 MHz
- Branding: Queen of Heaven and Earth Radio

Programming
- Format: Catholic Religious
- Affiliations: EWTN Radio

Ownership
- Owner: Little Flower Ministries

History
- Former call signs: KCUF (2012)
- Call sign meaning: K Queen of Heaven and Earth

Technical information
- Licensing authority: FCC
- Facility ID: 190428
- Class: C2
- ERP: 2,000 watts
- HAAT: 475 metres (1,558 ft)
- Transmitter coordinates: 64°52′46″N 148°03′19″W

Links
- Public license information: Public file; LMS
- Website: https://www.kqhe.org

KQHE (92.7 FM) is a radio station licensed to serve the Fairbanks, Alaska area, including Fairbanks, North Pole, and Nenana. The station is owned by Little Flower Ministries and airs a Catholic religious format, using a mixture of locally produced programming and content from EWTN Radio.

The station was assigned the call sign KCUF by the Federal Communications Commission on August 24, 2012. The station changed its call sign to KQHE on August 29, 2012. KQHE began broadcasting on August 22, 2013.
