= KVCK-FM =

Radio station in Wolf Point, Montana

- Wolf Point, Montana; United States
- Frequency: 92.7 MHz
- Branding: The Wolf

Programming
- Format: Country

Ownership
- Owner: Wolftrax Broadcasting, LLC
- Sister stations: KVCK (AM)

History
- First air date: 1981 (as KYZZ)
- Former call signs: KYZZ (1979–1989); KTYZ-FM (1989–1992)

Technical information
- Licensing authority: FCC
- Facility ID: 73384
- Class: C2
- ERP: 11,500 watts
- HAAT: 152 meters (499 feet)
- Transmitter coordinates: 48°11′09″N 105°40′08″W
- Translator: 107.1 K296BW (Glasgow)

Links
- Public license information: Public file; LMS
- Website: kvckradio.com

KVCK-FM (92.7 FM) is a radio station licensed to serve Wolf Point, Montana. The station is owned by Wolftrax Broadcasting, LLC. It airs a country music format.

This station was named to complement its older AM sister station KVCK. That station was named for its three original owners: 'V' for Mike Vukelich, 'C' for Pete Coffey, and 'K' for Ed Krebsbach. The station was assigned the KVCK-FM call letters by the Federal Communications Commission on November 15, 1992.

== Translators ==
Broadcast translator for KVCK-FM
Call sign	Frequency	City of license	FID	ERP (W)	Class	FCC info
K296BW	107.1 FM	Glasgow, MT	73386	7	D	LMS
