= WIDS (AM) =

- Russell Springs, Kentucky; United States
- Frequency: 570 kHz

Programming
- Format: Gospel Music

Ownership
- Owner: Hammond Broadcasting, Inc.

History
- First air date: October 14, 1982; 43 years ago

Technical information
- Licensing authority: FCC
- Facility ID: 37447
- Class: D
- Power: 500 watts day 42 watts night
- Transmitter coordinates: 37°5′39″N 85°4′49″W
- Translators: W240DV (95.9 MHz, Russell Springs)

Links
- Public license information: Public file; LMS

WIDS (570 AM) is a radio station broadcasting a Gospel Music format. Licensed to Russell Springs, Kentucky, United States. The station is currently owned by Hammond Broadcasting, Inc.
