= Pennsylvania Route 830 =

State highway in Pennsylvania, US

Pennsylvania Route 830
- PA 830 highlighted in red; the route prior to 2007 in pink

Route information
- Maintained by PennDOT
- Length: 10.99 mi (17.69 km)
- Existed: 1928–present

Major junctions
- West end: I-80 in Washington Township
- PA 950 in Falls Creek
- East end: US 219 in Sandy Township

Location
- Country: United States
- State: Pennsylvania
- Counties: Jefferson, Clearfield

Highway system
- Pennsylvania State Route System; Interstate; US; State; Scenic; Legislative
← PA 829	→ PA 831

Pennsylvania Route 830 (PA 830) is a 10.99-mile-long (17.69 km) state highway located in Jefferson and Clearfield counties in Pennsylvania. The western terminus is at Interstate 80 in Washington Township. The eastern terminus is at US 219 in Sandy Township.

== Route description ==
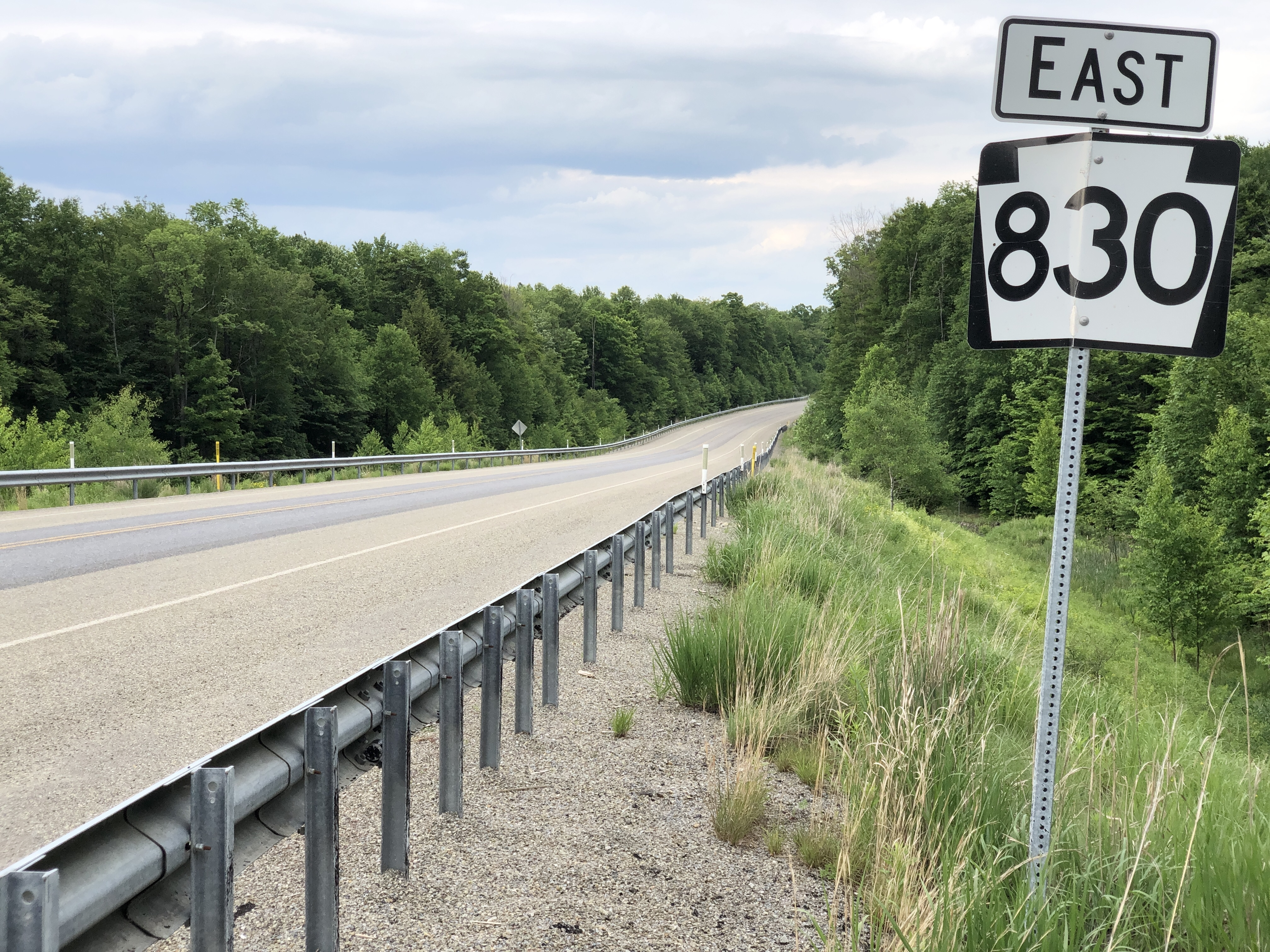
PA 830 eastbound in Washington Township

PA 830 begins at an interchange with I-80 in Washington Township, Jefferson County, heading northwest on two-lane undivided Sensor Road. The road heads through forested areas, heading through an area of fields before curving northeast through more wooded areas on Airport Road. The route heads to the east and runs between woodland to the north and farms to the south as it passes to the north of DuBois Regional Airport. PA 830 heads east-southeast through a mix of farmland and woodland with some homes, continuing east into more wooded areas of residential development and passing through Rockdale. The road turns to the southeast and runs through more forests with some fields and homes, heading south to pass over I-80. The route passes through Red Mill and turns southeast into more forested areas with some residences, crossing into the borough of Falls Creek and becoming Washington Avenue. PA 830 passes several homes, turning to the east onto Main Street and coming to an intersection with the northern terminus of PA 950. Following this, the road passes more residences and businesses. PA 830 enters Clearfield County and passes through more of Falls Creek before heading into Sandy Township, where it becomes Slab Run Road and crosses the Buffalo and Pittsburgh Railroad's B&P Main Line Subdivision line immediately north of a junction with another Buffalo and Pittsburgh Railroad line. The route continues to the north of the railroad tracks, running through wooded areas with some commercial development as it comes to its eastern terminus at US 219.

== History ==
From its commissioning prior to 1984, the western terminus of PA 830 began at then PA 968 (now SR 4005) at the hamlet of Richardsville in Warsaw Township. Here it continued south for a short distance, then turned south southeast to the village of Hazen at an intersection with PA 28. PA 28 would later serve as the western terminus of PA 830 after the decommissioning of PA 968. After a short concurrency with PA 28, PA 830 continued as it turned east on Allens Mills Road to its current routing. As it approached the village of Allens Mills, the former routing of PA 310 met its northern terminus here where it ran south to I-80 at Exit 86 and came to an intersection with US 322 near Emerickville and turned southeast to form a concurrency with US 322 towards Reynoldsville. This section of PA 310 was later deleted and in 1984 reactivated as a realignment of PA 830 until 2007.

Prior to 2007, PA 830 ran further west into Washington and Pine Creek Townships. The route began at US 322 near Emerickville. It had an interchange with I-80 at Exit 86 and traveled a winding route heading northeast. At Red Barn Road, it made a right turn and passed the old entrance to the DuBois Regional Airport. It made a sharp right curve at Allens Mills Road where the present routing continues today. The route between US 322 and Red Barn Road is still state-maintained as SR 1830 and the section of Red Barn Road between SR 1830 and the modern-day PA 830 is SR 1013. Parts of the old PA 830 are still drivable between the PA 830 / SR 1830 intersection and Allens Mills Road, but it is not completely passable due to breaks in the pavement and the new parking lot for the airport.

Construction began on the new five-mile (8-km) access road to the DuBois Airport and the new I-80 interchange in July 2004. The project was completed in 2007 under budget and winning awards from the American Association of State Highway and Transportation Officials.

== Major intersections ==
County	Location	mi	km	Destinations	Notes
Jefferson	Washington Township	0.00	0.00	I-80 – DuBois, Clarion	Exit 90 (I-80); western terminus
Jefferson	Falls Creek	9.80	15.77	PA 950 south (3rd Street) – Reynoldsville	
Clearfield	Sandy Township	10.99	17.69	US 219 (Rich Highway) to I-80	Eastern terminus
1.000 mi = 1.609 km; 1.000 km = 0.621 mi
