= Pennsylvania Route 310 =

State highway in Jefferson County, Pennsylvania, US

Pennsylvania Route 310

Route information
- Maintained by PennDOT
- Length: 12.552 mi (20.200 km)

Major junctions
- South end: US 119 in Punxsutawney
- North end: US 322 in Reynoldsville

Location
- Country: United States
- State: Pennsylvania
- Counties: Jefferson

Highway system
- Pennsylvania State Route System; Interstate; US; State; Scenic; Legislative
← PA 309	→ PA 312

Pennsylvania Route 310 (PA 310) is a 12.6-mile-long (20.3 km) state highway located in Jefferson County, Pennsylvania. The southern terminus is at U.S. Route 119 (US 119) in Punxsutawney. The northern terminus is at US 322 in Reynoldsville.

== Route description ==
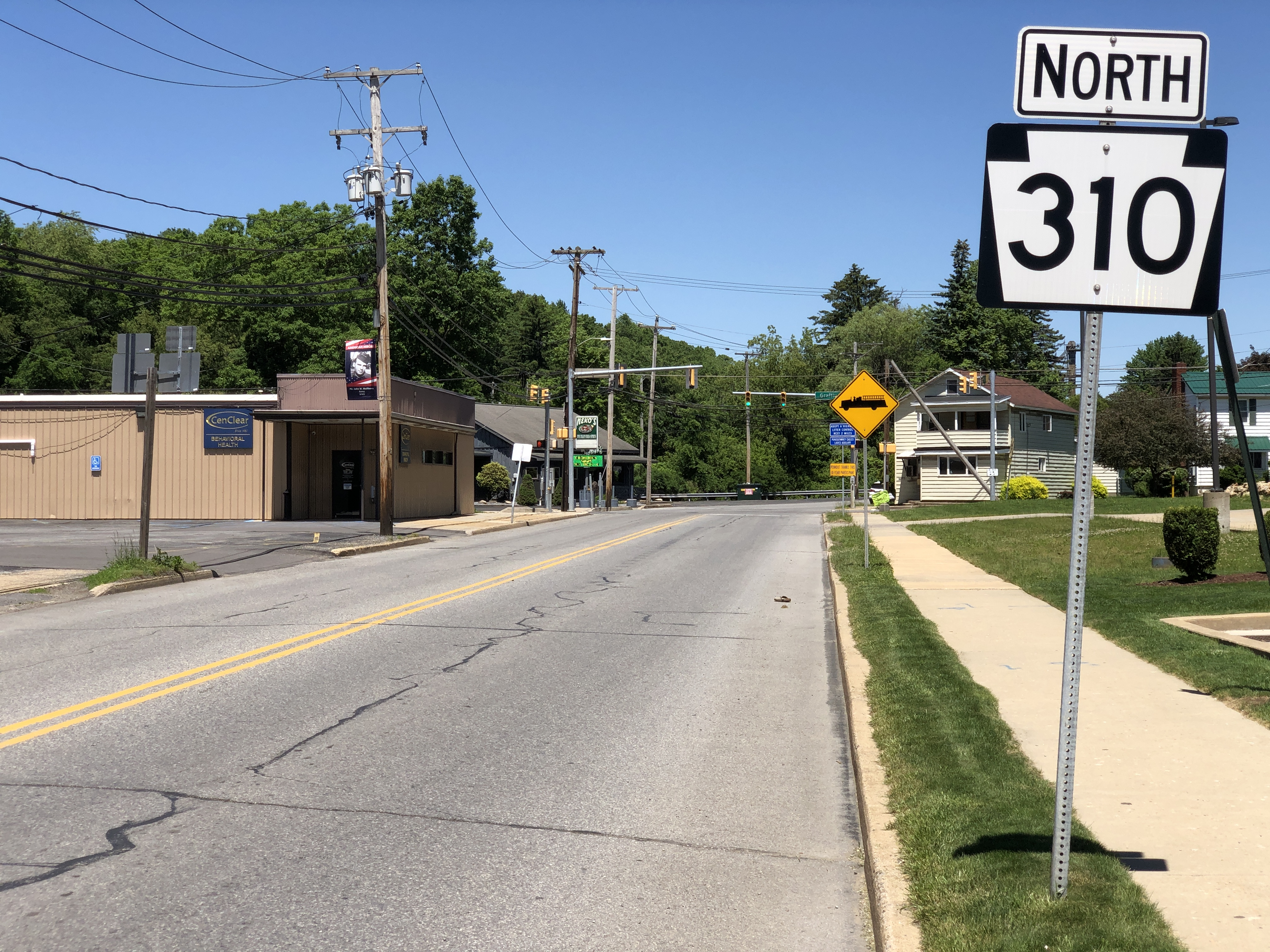
PA 310 northbound past US 119 in Punxsutawney

PA 310 begins at an intersection with US 119 in the borough of Punxsutawney, heading north on two-lane undivided Elk Run Avenue. The road runs through commercial areas before crossing a Buffalo and Pittsburgh Railroad line at-grade and passing homes. The route crosses into Young Township and becomes Harmony Road, heading into more wooded areas with a few residences as it comes to the community of Harmony. At this point, PA 310 winds north thorough more woodland with some fields and homes, passing through Crawfordtown. The road enters McCalmont Township and becomes Main Street, turning northeast and running through the residential community of Anita. From this point, the route heads north again through more forests before coming into areas of agriculture with some homes and passing through Panic. PA 310 heads northeast into Winslow Township and runs through farmland and woodland with occasional residences as an unnamed road. The route continues northeast through more rural areas before heading into the borough of Reynoldsville and becoming Bradford Street, passing homes. PA 310 turns northwest onto Jackson Street and continues through more residential areas. The route turns northeast onto South 5th Street and heads into business areas, ending at US 322.

== History ==
From its commissioning from 1926 to 1984, the northern terminus was at an intersection with PA 830 at the village of Allens Mills. PA 310 ran south to I-80 at Exit 86 and came to an intersection with US 322 near Emerickville and turned southeast to form a concurrency with US 322 towards Reynoldsville. This section of PA 310 was later deleted and in 1984 the section from US 322 to I-80 reactivated as a realignment of PA 830 until 2007.

== Major intersections ==
The entire route is in Jefferson County.

Location	mi	km	Destinations	Notes
Punxsutawney	0.000	0.000	US 119 (Ridge Avenue) – DuBois, Indiana	Southern terminus
Reynoldsville	12.552	20.200	US 322 (East Main Street) – Brookville, Clearfield	Northern terminus
1.000 mi = 1.609 km; 1.000 km = 0.621 mi
