= Pine Creek Township, Jefferson County, Pennsylvania =

Township in Pennsylvania, US

Coordinates: 41°07′00″N 78°58′59″W

- Township
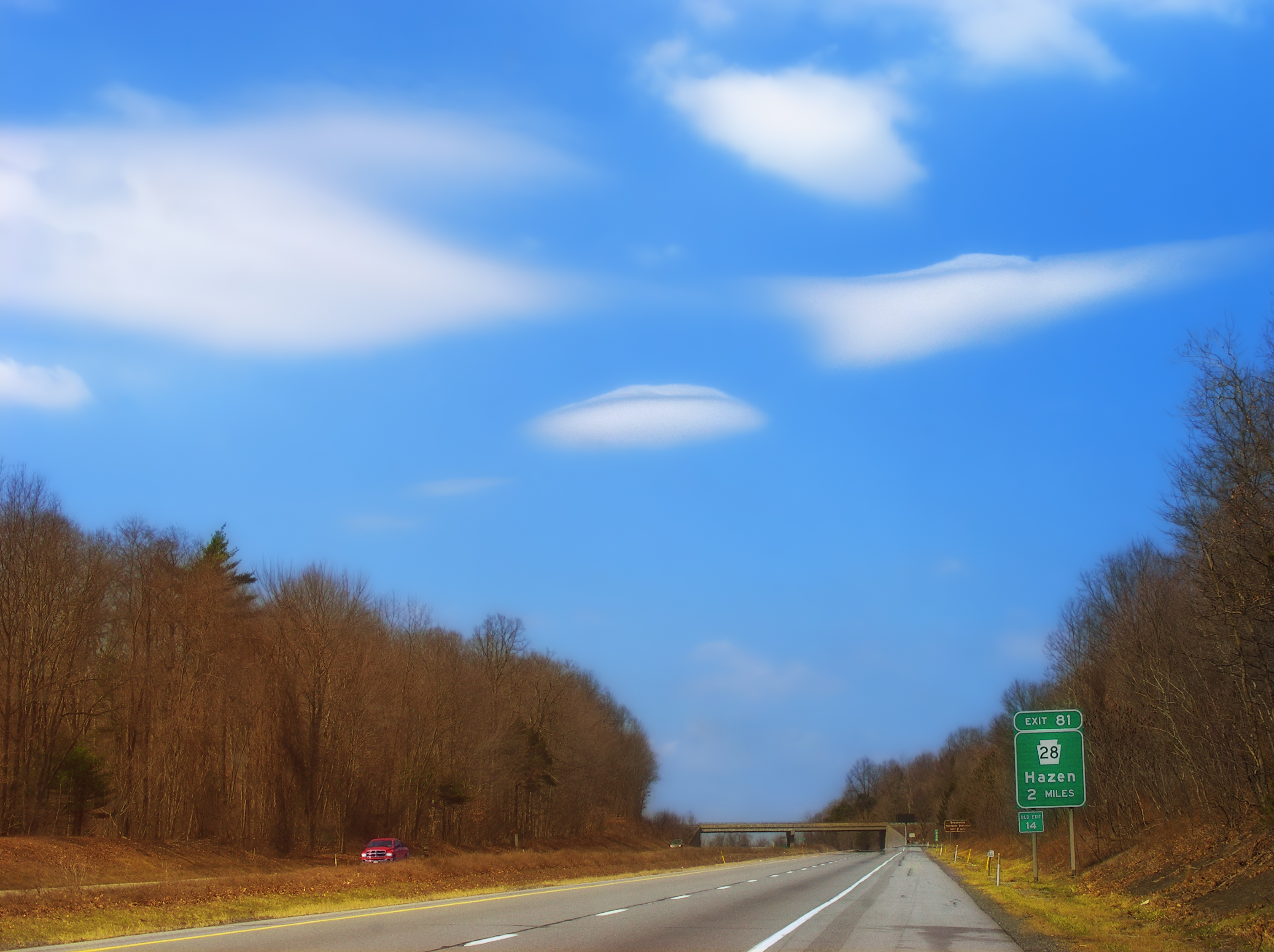
- Interstate 80 as it passes through Pine Creek Township

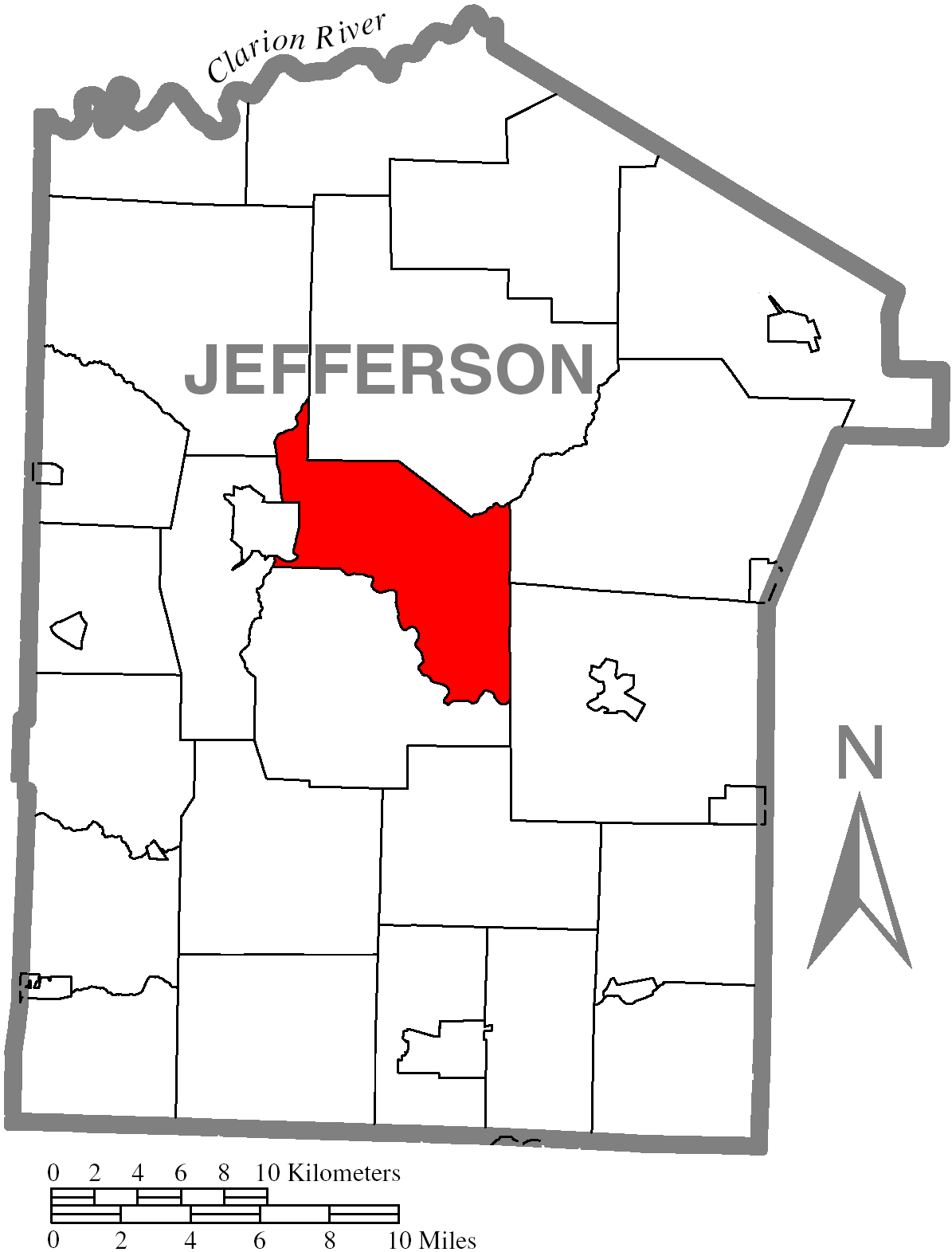
- Map of Jefferson County, Pennsylvania Highlighting Pine Creek Township

- Map of Jefferson County, Pennsylvania
- Country: United States
- State: Pennsylvania
- County: Jefferson
- Settled: 1796
- Incorporated: 1806

Government
  - Type: Township of the Second Class, having a three-member board of supervisors

Area
  - Total: 28.59 sq mi (74.06 km^{2})
  - Land: 28.31 sq mi (73.33 km^{2})
  - Water: 0.28 sq mi (0.73 km^{2})

Population (2020)
  - Total: 1,325 ▼
  - Estimate (2023): 1,306
  - Density: 46.80/sq mi (18.07/km^{2})
- Time zone: UTC-5 (Eastern (EST))
  - Summer (DST): UTC-4 (EDT)
- FIPS code: 42-065-60368

Pine Creek Township is a township in Jefferson County, Pennsylvania, United States. The population was 1,325 at the 2020 census. The township was named for the abundance of pine trees in the area.

== Geography ==
The township is in central Jefferson County and is bordered to the west by the borough of Brookville, the county seat. Interstate 80 passes through the township, with access from Exit 81 (Pennsylvania Route 28) and Exit 86 (Pennsylvania Route 830). U.S. Route 322 runs through the township south of and roughly parallel to I-80, leading west into Brookville and southeast to Reynoldsville.

According to the United States Census Bureau, the township has a total area of 28.6 square miles (74.1 km^{2}), of which 28.3 square miles (73.3 km^{2}) are land and 0.3 square miles (0.7 km^{2}), or 0.99%, are water. Sandy Lick Creek, a northwestward-flowing tributary of Redbank Creek, forms the southwestern border of the township, while the North Fork of Redbank Creek forms part of the western border.

Unincorporated communities in the township include Pinecreek, Port Barnett, Emerickville, Iowa, Fuller, and Meredith.

== Demographics ==
Historical population
Census	Pop.	Note	%±
1850	778		—
1860	729		−6.3%
1870	941		29.1%
1880	1,180		25.4%
1890	1,347		14.2%
1900	1,162		−13.7%
1910	1,162		0.0%
1920	1,263		8.7%
1930	1,255		−0.6%
1940	1,378		9.8%
1950	1,067		−22.6%
1960	1,171		9.7%
1970	1,181		0.9%
1980	1,407		19.1%
1990	1,413		0.4%
2000	1,369		−3.1%
2010	1,352		−1.2%
2020	1,325		−2.0%
2023 (est.)	1,306		−1.4%
U.S. Decennial Census

As of the census of 2000, there were 1,369 people, 424 households, and 323 families residing in the township. The population density was 48.0 inhabitants per square mile (18.5/km^{2}). There were 477 housing units at an average density of 16.7 units per square mile (6.4 units/km^{2}). The racial makeup of the township was 98.25% White, 0.15% African American, 0.44% Asian, 0.51% from other races, and 0.66% from two or more races. Hispanic or Latino of any race were 0.22% of the population.

There were 424 households, out of which 32.1% had children under the age of 18 living with them, 64.9% were married couples living together, 7.5% had a female householder with no husband present, and 23.6% were non-families. 20.3% of all households were made up of individuals, and 9.4% had someone living alone who was 65 years of age or older. The average household size was 2.55 and the average family size was 2.93.

In the township the population was spread out, with 18.1% under the age of 18, 7.9% from 18 to 24, 23.2% from 25 to 44, 22.1% from 45 to 64, and 28.7% who were 65 years of age or older. The median age was 46 years. For every 100 females, there were 97.5 males. For every 100 females age 18 and over, there were 91.6 males.

The median income for a household in the township was $32,574, and the median income for a family was $37,891. Males had a median income of $28,269 versus $21,169 for females. The per capita income for the township was $15,426. About 8.4% of families and 10.2% of the population were below the poverty line, including 14.0% of those under age 18 and 9.6% of those age 65 or over.
