= Bob Boozer (American football) =

American athletic director and athletics coach (1912–2006)

Biographical details
- Born: August 20, 1912; DuBois, Pennsylvania, U.S.
- Died: October 1, 2006 (aged 94); Brockport, New York, U.S.
- Education: Slippery Rock State Teachers College (1936); International YMCA College (1947); University of Buffalo

Playing career

Football
- 1932–1935: Slippery Rock State

Track and field
- 1932–1935: Slippery Rock State
- Position: Split end (football)

Coaching career (HC unless noted)

Football
- 1936–1938: Indiana State (assistant)
- 1939–1942: DuBois HS (PA) (assistant)
- 1946: Springfield (assistant)
- 1947–1959: Brockport State / Brockport

Basketball
- c. 1940s: DuBois HS (PA) (assistant)
- 1947–1948: Brockport State

Track and field
- c. 1940s: DuBois HS (PA) (assistant)
- 1951–1955: Brockport (assistant)
- 1956–1971: Brockport

Wrestling
- 1941–1942: DuBois HS (PA) (co-HC)

Administrative career (AD unless noted)
- c. 1950s–1971: Brockport (assistant AD)

Head coaching record
- Overall: 22–52–7 (college football)

Accomplishments and honors

Awards
- Brockport Hall of Fame (1985)

Robert Ellsworth Boozer (August 20, 1912 – October 1, 2006) was an American athletic director and college athletics coach. He was the athletic director for State University of New York at Brockport—now known as SUNY Brockport—from the 1950s to 1971. He was the head football coach for the school from 1947 to 1959.

== Early life and playing career ==
Boozer was born on August 20, 1912, in DuBois, Pennsylvania. He attended Rimersburg High School and played football, basketball, and ran track and field. Following his graduation he was a member of the football and track and field team for Slippery Rock State Teachers College—now known as Slippery Rock University. He was a split end for the Slippery Rock football team.

== Coaching career ==
Following Boozer's graduation he served as an assistant football coach for Indiana State from 1936 to 1938 under head coach Wally Marks. In 1939, he returned to his hometown and was an assistant football, basketball, and track and field coach for DuBois High School. He also served as the head wrestling coach alongside Joe Kagy from 1941 to 1942. After not coaching from 1942 to 1945, Boozer was hired as an assistant coach for the International YMCA College—commonly referred to as Springfield—under head coach Ossie Solem. In 1947, he was hired as the first head coach for Brockport and was to lead them in their first season of varsity football. In thirteen seasons with the team he led them to a 22–52–7 record, his best coming in 1957 as the team finished with its first winning season ever as they went 4–2–1. He resigned following the 1959 season. From 1956 to 1971, Boozer also served as the head track and field coach at Brockport after serving as an assistant from 1951 and 1955.

== Athletic director career and military career ==
From 1942 to 1945, Boozer served as a Lieutenant in the United States Navy. He was stationed on a battleship in New York which was used during the nuclear testing at Bikini Atoll.

From the 1950s to 1971, Boozer served as the athletic director for Brockport.

== Personal life, honors, and death ==
During Boozer's college career he was the president of the Phi Sigma Pi fraternity and was the vice president of the Pi Gamma Mu fraternity.

In 1985, Boozer was inducted into the Brockport Hall of Fame as a coach and administrator. The school's football field was renamed to Bob Boozer Field in his honor.

Boozer died on October 1, 2006, in Brockport, New York.

== Head coaching record ==
=== College football ===
Year	Team	Overall	Conference	Standing	Bowl/playoffs
Brockport State / Brockport Golden Eagles (Independent) (1947–1959)
1947	Brockport State	0–3			
1948	Brockport State	1–5			
1949	Brockport	1–4–2			
1950	Brockport	2–4			
1951	Brockport	2–4			
1952	Brockport	0–3–1			
1953	Brockport	0–6			
1954	Brockport	2–3–2			
1955	Brockport	2–5			
1956	Brockport	4–4			
1957	Brockport	4–2–1			
1958	Brockport	3–4			
1959	Brockport	1–5–1			
Brockport State / Brockport:		22–52–7			
Total:		22–52–7			
