= DuBois Area Senior High School =

Coordinates: 41.12789°N 78.74872°W

DuBois Area High School
- 425 Orient Avenue; DuBois, Pennsylvania 15801; United States

Information
- Type: Public
- Staff: 69.40 (FTE)
- Grades: 9–12
- Enrollment: 903 (2023–2024)
- Student to teacher ratio: 13.01
- Campus type: Rural
- Colors: Red, Black and White
- Mascot: Beaver
- Website: https://dah.dubois.school/

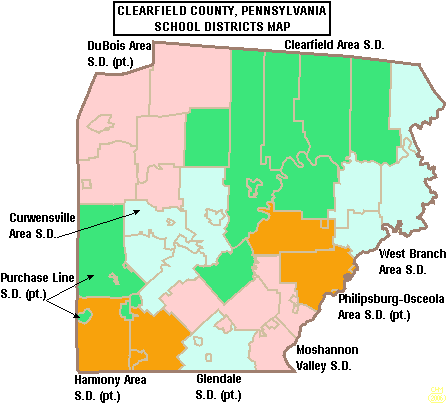
Map of Clearfield County, Pennsylvania Public School Districts

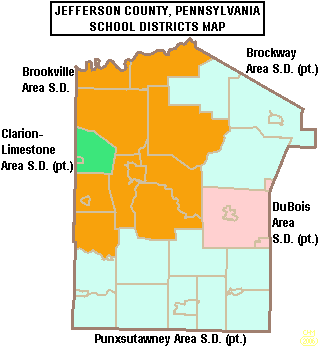
Dubois Area School District in Jefferson County

DuBois Area High School is a midsized, rural, public high school located in the city of DuBois, Pennsylvania. The high school serves students from most of north-western Clearfield County, and in Jefferson County, it covers the Boroughs of Falls Creek, Reynoldsville, Sykesville, and Winslow Township. The school is part of the DuBois Area School District. In the 2018–19 school year, DuBois Area High School had 1,009 students enrolled in grades 9–12.

== Extracurriculars ==
DuBois Area School District offers a wide variety of clubs, activities and a sports program.

=== Sports ===
The District funds:

Boys

- Baseball - AAAA
- Basketball- AAAA
- Cross Country - AAA
- Football - AAAA
- Golf - AAA
- Rifle - AAAA
- Soccer - AAA
- Swimming and Diving - AAA
- Tennis - AAA
- Track and Field - AAA
- Volleyball - AAA
- Wrestling - AAA

Girls

- Basketball - AAAA
- Cheer - AAAA
- Cross Country - AAA
- Golf - AAA
- Gymnastics - AAAA
- Rifle - AAAA
- Soccer (Fall) - AAA
- Softball - AAAA
- Swimming and Diving - AAA
- Girls' Tennis - AAA
- Track and Field - AAA
- Volleyball - AAA

According to PIAA directory July 2012
