= List of Phi Sigma Pi chapters =

Phi Sigma Pi is a national honor fraternity. In the following list, active chapters are listed in bold and inactive chapters are listed in italics.

Chapter	Charter date and range	Institution	Location	Status	Ref.
Alpha	February 14, 1916–1942, 1946–1979, 2000–202x ?	University of Central Missouri	Warrensburg, Missouri	Inactive	
Beta	1921–1936, 1996–2023	Truman State University	Kirksville, Missouri	Inactive	
Gamma	1921–1942, 1946–1959	Bradley University	Peoria, Illinois	Inactive	
Delta	19xx ?–1938	Pittsburg State University	Pittsburg, Kansas	Inactive	
Epsilon	1928–1934, 2009–20xx ?	Vanderbilt University	Nashville, Tennessee	Inactive	
Zeta	192x–1931	Dakota State College	Madison, South Dakota	Inactive	
Eta	1929–1942, 1946–19xx ?, 1989–?	Indiana University of Pennsylvania	Indiana County, Pennsylvania	Inactive	
Theta	1930–1942, 1946–?	Mansfield University of Pennsylvania	Mansfield, Pennsylvania	Inactive	
**Iota**	1930–1942, 1946	Bloomsburg University of Pennsylvania	Bloomsburg, Pennsylvania	Active	
Kappa	1930–1942, 1946–?	PennWest California	California, Pennsylvania	Inactive	
Lambda	1930–1942, 1946–2009	PennWest Clarion	Clarion, Pennsylvania	Inactive	(Note: When this chapter was chartered and while active, this school was named Clarion University. In 2021 that school merged with California University of Pennsylvania and Edinboro University of Pennsylvania. All three campuses of the combined school had chapters at some point, but all are now inactive.)
**Mu**	1930–1942, 1990	Slippery Rock University of Pennsylvania	Slippery Rock, Pennsylvania	Active	
Nu	193x–1937	Western New Mexico University	Silver City, New Mexico	Inactive	
Xi	193x ?–1937	Northwestern Oklahoma State University	Alva, Oklahoma	Inactive	
**Omicron**	1931–1942, 1946–197x ?, 1987	Shippensburg University of Pennsylvania	Shippensburg, Pennsylvania	Active	
Pi	193x–1942, 1946–1997	Dickinson State University	Dickinson, North Dakota	Inactive	
Rho	193x–1942, 1946–1997	University of the District of Columbia	Washington, D.C.	Inactive	
**Sigma**	1934–1942, 1946	Millersville University of Pennsylvania	Millersville, Pennsylvania	Active	
**Tau**	1936–1942, 1946	East Carolina University	Greenville, North Carolina	Active	
Upsilon	1938–1942, 1946–1968, 1991–?	PennWest Edinboro	Edinboro, Pennsylvania	Inactive	
Phi	19xx ?–1981	Minot State University	Minot, North Dakota	Inactive	
Omega	19xx ?–2001	University of Southern Maine	Portland, Maine	Inactive	
Alpha Alpha	19xx ?–1990	Converse University	Spartanburg, South Carolina	Inactive	
**Alpha Beta**	1988	University of Maryland	College Park, Maryland	Active	
Alpha Gamma	1988–2001	University of Pennsylvania	Philadelphia, Pennsylvania	Inactive	
**Alpha Delta**	1988	Widener University	Chester, Pennsylvania	Active	
**Alpha Epsilon**	1988	West Chester University	West Chester, Pennsylvania	Active	
**Alpha Zeta**	1989	York College of Pennsylvania	York, Pennsylvania	Active	
**Alpha Eta**	1989	University of Delaware	Newark, Delaware	Active	
**Alpha Theta**	1990–1999, 2006	Rutgers University–New Brunswick	New Brunswick, New Jersey	Active	
Alpha Iota	1990–?	Montclair State University	Montclair, New Jersey	Inactive	
**Alpha Kappa**	1990	University of North Carolina at Chapel Hill	Chapel Hill, North Carolina	Active	
Alpha Lambda	1990–?	Temple University	Philadelphia, Pennsylvania	Inactive	
Alpha Mu	1991–2026	West Virginia University	Morgantown, West Virginia	Inactive	
Alpha Nu	199x ?–1992	Utah State University	Logan, Utah	Inactive	
**Alpha Xi**	1991	Radford University	Radford, Virginia	Active	
**Alpha Omicron**	1991	University of Virginia	Charlottesville, Virginia	Active	
**Alpha Pi**	1991	Pennsylvania State University	University Park, Pennsylvania	Active	
**Alpha Rho**	1991	Virginia Tech	Blacksburg, Virginia	Active	
**Alpha Sigma**	1991–1993, 1998	Virginia Commonwealth University	Richmond, Virginia	Active	
Alpha Tau	199x ?–2012	Howard University	Washington, D.C.	Inactive	
**Alpha Upsilon**	1992	University of South Carolina	Columbia, South Carolina	Active	
Alpha Phi	1992–20xx ?	Eastern Michigan University	Ypsilanti, Michigan	Inactive	
Alpha Chi	1992–?	University of North Carolina at Greensboro	Greensboro, North Carolina	Inactive	
Alpha Psi	1992–2002	Fairleigh Dickinson University	Rutherford, New Jersey	Inactive	
Alpha Omega	1992–2026	University of Pittsburgh	Pittsburgh, Pennsylvania	Inactive	
Beta Alpha	1992–2026	University of Michigan	Ann Arbor, Michigan	Inactive	
**Beta Beta**	1992	Kent State University	Kent, Ohio	Active	
Beta Gamma	1992–1996	University of Maine at Farmington	Farmington, Maine	Inactive	
**Beta Delta**	1992	North Carolina State University	Raleigh, North Carolina	Active	
**Beta Epsilon**	1993	Syracuse University	Syracuse, New York	Active	
**Beta Zeta**	1993	University of Georgia	Athens, Georgia	Active	
**Beta Eta**	1993	Lock Haven University of Pennsylvania	Lock Haven, Pennsylvania	Active	
Beta Theta	199x ?–2001	Wright State University	Dayton, Ohio	Inactive	
**Beta Iota**	1994	Ohio State University	Columbus, Ohio	Active	
**Beta Kappa**	1994	Clemson University	Clemson, South Carolina	Active	
**Beta Lambda**	1994–1995, 2011	American University	Washington, D.C.	Active	
**Beta Mu**	1994	George Washington University	Washington, D.C.	Active	
**Beta Nu**	1994	Cornell University	Ithaca, New York	Active	
**Beta Xi**	1994	Miami University	Oxford, Ohio	Active	
Beta Omicron	1994–?	University of North Carolina Wilmington	Wilmington, North Carolina	Inactive	
**Beta Pi**	1994	University of Connecticut	Storrs, Connecticut	Active	
**Beta Rho**	1995	James Madison University	Harrisonburg, Virginia	Active	
**Beta Sigma**	1995	Michigan State University	East Lansing, Michigan	Active	
Beta Tau	1995–1998	University of New Hampshire	Durham, New Hampshire	Inactive	
Beta Upsilon	1995–?	University of Massachusetts Amherst	Amherst, Massachusetts	Inactive	
**Beta Phi**	1995	Western Kentucky University	Bowling Green, Kentucky	Active	
Beta Chi	1995–2000	Bucknell University	Lewisburg, Pennsylvania	Inactive	
**Beta Psi**	1995	Middle Tennessee State University	Murfreesboro, Tennessee	Active	
Beta Omega	1995–2026	Eastern Illinois University	Charleston, Illinois	Inactive	
Gamma Alpha	1995–?	Purdue University	West Lafayette, Indiana	Inactive	
**Gamma Beta**	1995	Morehead State University	Morehead, Kentucky	Active	
**Gamma Gamma**	1995	Georgia Southern University	Statesboro, Georgia	Active	
Gamma Delta	1995–?	University of West Georgia	Carrollton, Georgia	Inactive	
**Gamma Epsilon**	1996	University of Florida	Gainesville, Florida	Active	
**Gamma Zeta**	1996	Western Carolina University	Cullowhee, North Carolina	Active	
**Gamma Eta**	1996	Florida State University	Tallahassee, Florida	Active	
Gamma Theta	1996–2026	Louisiana State University	Baton Rouge, Louisiana	Inactive	
Gamma Iota	1996–?	College of Charleston	Charleston, South Carolina	Inactive	
Gamma Kappa	1996–1998	Piedmont University	Demorest, Georgia	Inactive	
Gamma Lambda	1996–2003	Louisiana Tech University	Ruston, Louisiana	Inactive	
Gamma Mu	1996–2026	Central Michigan University	Mount Pleasant, Michigan	Inactive	
Gamma Nu	199x ?–2010	University of Southern Mississippi	Hattiesburg, Mississippi	Inactive	
**Gamma Xi**	1997	Drexel University	Philadelphia, Pennsylvania	Active	
**Gamma Omicron**	1997	Auburn University	Auburn, Alabama	Active	
**Gamma Pi**	1997	Towson University	Towson, Maryland	Active	
Gamma Rho	1997–2026	Western Michigan University	Kalamazoo, Michigan	Inactive	
**Gamma Sigma**	1997	Missouri State University	Springfield, Missouri	Active	
Gamma Tau	1997–?	Tulane University	New Orleans, Louisiana	Inactive	
**Gamma Upsilon**	1998	University of Kentucky	Lexington, Kentucky	Active	
Gamma Phi	1998–?	University of Oklahoma	Norman, Oklahoma	Inactive	
Gamma Chi	1998–?	University of Central Florida	Orlando, Florida	Inactive	
**Gamma Psi**	1998	College of William & Mary	Williamsburg, Virginia	Active	
Gamma Omega	1998–2026	University of Nebraska–Lincoln	Lincoln, Nebraska	Inactive	
**Delta Alpha**	1998	Rochester Institute of Technology	Rochester, New York	Active	
**Delta Beta**	1998	University of Alabama	Tuscaloosa, Alabama	Active	
Delta Gamma	199x ?–1996	Valdosta State University	Valdosta, Georgia	Inactive	
Delta Delta	199x ?–2000	University of Arkansas	Fayetteville, North Carolina	Inactive	
Delta Epsilon	199x ?–?	Duke University	Durham, North Carolina	Inactive	
Delta Zeta	199x ?–2011	University of Memphis	Memphis, Tennessee	Inactive	
**Delta Eta**	1999	Illinois State University	Normal, Illinois	Active	
Delta Theta	1999–2002	Morgan State University	Baltimore, Maryland	Inactive	
Delta Iota	1999–?	New Mexico State University	Las Cruces, New Mexico	Inactive	
**Delta Kappa**	1999	University of North Texas	Denton, Texas	Active	
Delta Lambda	2000–2003, 2008–20xx ?	University of Miami	Miami	Inactive	
Delta Xi	2000–20xx ?	University of Missouri	Columbia, Missouri	Inactive	
Delta Mu	2000–20xx ?	University of Maine	Orono, Maine	Inactive	
Delta Nu	200x ?–2002	University of Hawaiʻi	Honolulu, Hawaii	Inactive	
Delta Omicron	200x ?–2005	University of Mississippi	Oxford, Mississippi	Inactive	
Delta Pi	200x ?–2005	Texas Tech University	Lubbock, Texas	Inactive	
Delta Rho	2001–2026	University of Northern Colorado	Greeley, Colorado	Inactive	
**Delta Sigma**	2001	University of Colorado Boulder	Boulder, Colorado	Active	
**Delta Tau**	2001	Mississippi State University	Starkville, Mississippi	Active	
Delta Upsilon	2001–2026	Sam Houston State University	Huntsville, Texas	Inactive	
**Delta Phi**	2001	Texas State University	San Marcos, Texas	Active	
**Delta Chi**	2001	Lehigh University	Bethlehem, Pennsylvania	Active	
Delta Psi	200x ?–2017	University of Texas at Austin	Austin, Texas	Inactive	
Delta Omega	200x ?–20xx ?	University of California, Berkeley	Berkeley, California	Inactive	
Epsilon Alpha	2002–2026	Kutztown University of Pennsylvania	Kutztown, Pennsylvania	Inactive	
**Epsilon Beta**	2002	Bowling Green State University	Bowling Green, Ohio	Active	
Epsilon Gamma	200x ?–2006	Southeastern Louisiana University	Hammond, Louisiana	Inactive	
Epsilon Delta	2003–20xx ?	University of South Florida	Tampa, Florida	Inactive	
Epsilon Epsilon	200x ?–2007	University of Houston	Houston, Texas	Inactive	
Epsilon Zeta	2004–20xx ?	University of Illinois Urbana-Champaign	Urbana, Illinois	Inactive	
Epsilon Eta	200x ?–2017	Eastern Kentucky University	Richmond, Kentucky	Inactive	
Epsilon Theta	2007–2026	Georgia Institute of Technology	Atlanta, Georgia	Inactive	
**Epsilon Iota**	2006	Ohio University	Athens, Ohio	Active	
Epsilon Kappa	2007–20xx ?	Wentworth Institute of Technology	Boston, Massachusetts	Inactive	
Epsilon Lambda	2007–20xx ?	Minnesota State University, Mankato	Mankato, Minnesota	Inactive	
Epsilon Mu	2007–2026	University of Texas at San Antonio	San Antonio, Texas	Inactive	
Epsilon Nu	2008–20xx ?	Kennesaw State University	Cobb County, Georgia	Inactive	
**Epsilon Xi**	2008	East Tennessee State University	Johnson City, Tennessee	Active	
Epsilon Omicron	2008–2026	East Stroudsburg University of Pennsylvania	East Stroudsburg, Pennsylvania	Inactive	
Epsilon Pi	2008–2010	Oklahoma State University–Stillwater	Stillwater, Oklahoma	Inactive	
Epsilon Rho	2008–20xx ?	Northern Kentucky University	Highland Heights, Kentucky	Inactive	
**Epsilon Sigma**	2008	University of Iowa	Iowa City, Iowa	Active	
**Epsilon Tau**	2008	Villanova University	Villanova, Pennsylvania	Active	
Epsilon Upsilon	2008–20xx ?	University of New Mexico	Albuquerque, New Mexico	Inactive	
Epsilon Phi	2009–20xx ?	University of Cincinnati	Cincinnati, Ohio	Inactive	
Epsilon Chi	2009–20xx ?	University of North Georgia	Dahlonega, Georgia	Inactive	
Epsilon Psi	2009–2026	Grand Valley State University	Allendale, Michigan	Inactive	
Epsilon Omega	2009–20xx ?	Arizona State University	Tempe, Arizona	Inactive	
**Zeta Alpha**	2010	University of California, San Diego	San Diego, California	Active	
**Zeta Beta**	2010	Franklin & Marshall College	Lancaster, Pennsylvania	Active	
Zeta Gamma	2010–20xx ?	Cleveland State University	Cleveland, Ohio	Inactive	
Zeta Delta	2010–20xx ?	George Mason University	Fairfax, Virginia	Inactive	
Zeta Epsilon	2010–20xx ?	University of California, Santa Barbara	Santa Barbara, California	Inactive	
Zeta Zeta	2010–20xx ?	Southern Methodist University	Dallas, Texas	Inactive	
Zeta Eta	2010–20xx ?	University of California, Riverside	Riverside, California	Inactive	
Zeta Theta	2010–2013	University of Illinois - Chicago	Chicago, Illinois	Inactive	
**Zeta Iota**	2011	Saint Joseph's University	Philadelphia, Pennsylvania	Active	
Zeta Kappa	2011–2014	University of Minnesota - Twin Cities	Minneapolis, Minnesota	Inactive	
Zeta Lambda	2011–2020 ?	University of California, Los Angeles	Los Angeles, California	Inactive	
Zeta Mu	2011–2020 ?	University of California, Irvine	Irvine, California	Inactive	
Zeta Nu	2011–2021 ?	Washington State University	Pullman, Washington	Inactive	
**Zeta Xi**	2011	Coastal Carolina University	Conway, South Carolina	Active	
Zeta Omicron	2012–20xx ?	Northwestern University	Evanston, Illinois	Inactive	
Zeta Pi	2012–20xx ?	Missouri University of Science and Technology	Rolla, Missouri	Inactive	
Zeta Rho	2012–20xx ?	University of Wisconsin–Madison	Madison, Wisconsin	Inactive	
Zeta Sigma	2012–20xx ?	University of Washington	Seattle, Washington	Inactive	
Zeta Tau	2012–20xx ?	Trinity University	San Antonio, Texas	Inactive	
Zeta Upsilon	2013–20xx ?	University of California, Davis	Davis, California	Inactive	
**Zeta Phi**	2013	Iowa State University	Ames, Iowa	Active	
Zeta Chi	2013–2018 ?	Kansas State University	Manhattan, Kansas	Inactive	
Zeta Psi	2013–20xx ?	University of Nevada, Las Vegas	Las Vegas, Nevada	Inactive	
Zeta Omega	2013–2021 ?	Seattle University	Seattle, Washington	Inactive	
Eta Alpha	2013–20xx ?	University of Northern Iowa	Cedar Falls, Iowa	Inactive	
Eta Beta	2014–20xx ?	University of Alabama at Birmingham	Birmingham, Alabama	Inactive	
Eta Gamma	2014–20xx ?	DePaul University	Chicago, Illinois	Inactive	
Eta Delta	2015–20xx ?	Emory University	Atlanta, Georgia	Inactive	
**Eta Epsilon**	2016	Frostburg State University	Frostburg, Maryland	Active	
Eta Zeta	2016–20xx ?	Old Dominion University	Norfolk, Virginia	Inactive	
Eta Eta	2016–c. 2019	Oakland University	Oakland County, Michigan	Inactive	
**Eta Theta**	2016	University of Tennessee	Knoxville, Tennessee	Active	
**Eta Iota**	2016	Longwood University	Farmville, Virginia	Active	
Eta Kappa	2016–20xx ?	Robert Morris University	Moon Township, Pennsylvania	Inactive	
**Eta Lambda**	2017	University of the Sciences	Philadelphia, Pennsylvania	Active	
Eta Mu	2017–2026	Rowan University	Glassboro, New Jersey	Inactive	
Eta Nu	2017–2026	University of Utah	Salt Lake City, Utah	Inactive	
**Eta Xi**	2018	University of North Carolina at Charlotte	Charlotte, North Carolina	Active	
Eta Omicron	2018–2026	Appalachian State University	Boone, North Carolina	Inactive	
**Eta Pi**	2018	Christopher Newport University	Newport News, Virginia	Active	
Eta Rho	2020–202x ?	Colorado State University	Fort Collins, Colorado	Inactive	
Eta Sigma	2019–202x ?	University of Rhode Island	Kingston, Rhode Island	Inactive	
Eta Tau	20xx ?–20xx ?	Wichita State University	Wichita, Kansas	Inactive	
Eta Upsilon	202x ?–202x ?	University of Arizona Global Campus	Chandler, Arizona	Inactive	
