= Dubois Historic District =

Dubois Historic District or DuBois Historic District may refer to:

- Dubois Historic District (Blackfoot, Idaho), proposed or formerly listed on the National Register of Historic Places in Bingham County
- Dubois Historic District (Dubois, Pennsylvania), listed on the National Register of Historic Places in Clearfield County
