= Sandy, Pennsylvania =

Unincorporated community in Pennsylvania, US

- Census-designated place
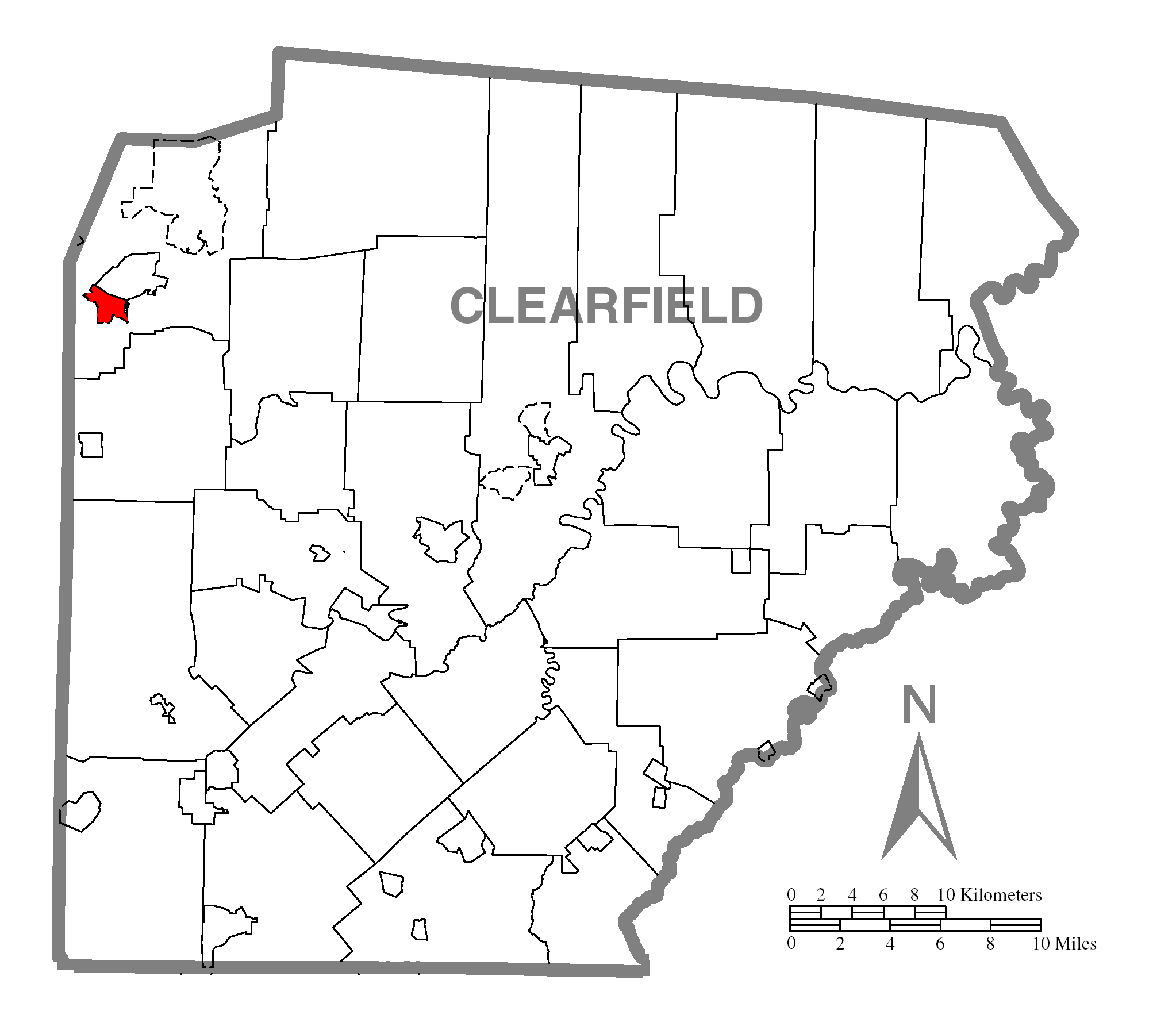
- Location of Sandy in Clearfield County

- Location of Clearfield County in Pennsylvania

- Location within the U.S. state of Pennsylvania Sandy (the United States)
- Coordinates: 41°6′31″N 78°46′21″W
- Country: United States
- State: Pennsylvania
- County: Clearfield
- Township: Sandy

Area
  - Total: 1.4 sq mi (3.6 km^{2})
  - Land: 1.4 sq mi (3.6 km^{2})
- Elevation: 1,430 ft (440 m)

Population (2020)
  - Total: 1,362
  - Density: 1,031/sq mi (398.2/km^{2})
- Time zone: UTC-5 (Eastern (EST))
  - Summer (DST): UTC-4 (EDT)
- ZIP code: 15801
- Area code: 814
- FIPS code: 42-67784
- GNIS feature ID: 1193286

Sandy is a census-designated place (CDP) in Clearfield County, Pennsylvania, United States. The population was 1,362 at the 2020 census.

== Geography ==
Sandy is located in northwestern Clearfield County at 41°6′31″N 78°46′21″W (41.108633, -78.772614), on the southern border of the city of DuBois. The CDP is in Sandy Township. U.S. Route 219 passes through Sandy, leading north into DuBois and southeast 5 miles (8 km) to Luthersburg.

According to the United States Census Bureau, the Sandy CDP has a total land area of 1.4 square miles (3.6 km^{2}), of which 0.004 square miles (0.01 km^{2}), or 0.23%, is water.

== Demographics ==
Historical population
Year	Pop.	±%
1990	1,795	—
2000	1,687	−6.0%
2010	1,429	−15.3%
2020	1,362	−4.7%

As of the census of 2000, there were 1,687 people, 658 households, and 459 families living in the CDP. The population density was 1,203.5 inhabitants per square mile (464.7/km^{2}). There were 687 housing units at an average density of 490.1 per square mile (189.2/km^{2}). The racial makeup of the CDP was 98.04% White, 0.36% African American, 0.12% Native American, 0.83% Asian, and 0.65% from two or more races. Hispanic or Latino of any race were 0.18% of the population.

There were 658 households, out of which 28.0% had children under the age of 18 living with them, 57.1% were married couples living together, 9.9% had a female householder with no husband present, and 30.1% were non-families. 26.4% of all households were made up of individuals, and 12.2% had someone living alone who was 65 years of age or older. The average household size was 2.40 and the average family size was 2.87.

In the CDP, the population was spread out, with 21.0% under the age of 18, 6.9% from 18 to 24, 27.2% from 25 to 44, 22.2% from 45 to 64, and 22.7% who were 65 years of age or older. The median age was 42 years. For every 100 females, there were 90.8 males. For every 100 females age 18 and over, there were 88.7 males.

The median income for a household in the CDP was $33,902, and the median income for a family was $42,222. Males had a median income of $30,464 versus $23,950 for females. The per capita income for the CDP was $16,968. About 2.6% of families and 5.8% of the population were below the poverty line, including 3.7% of those under age 18 and 6.5% of those age 65 or over.
