= Jan D. Miller =

American engineer (born 1942)

Jan Miller
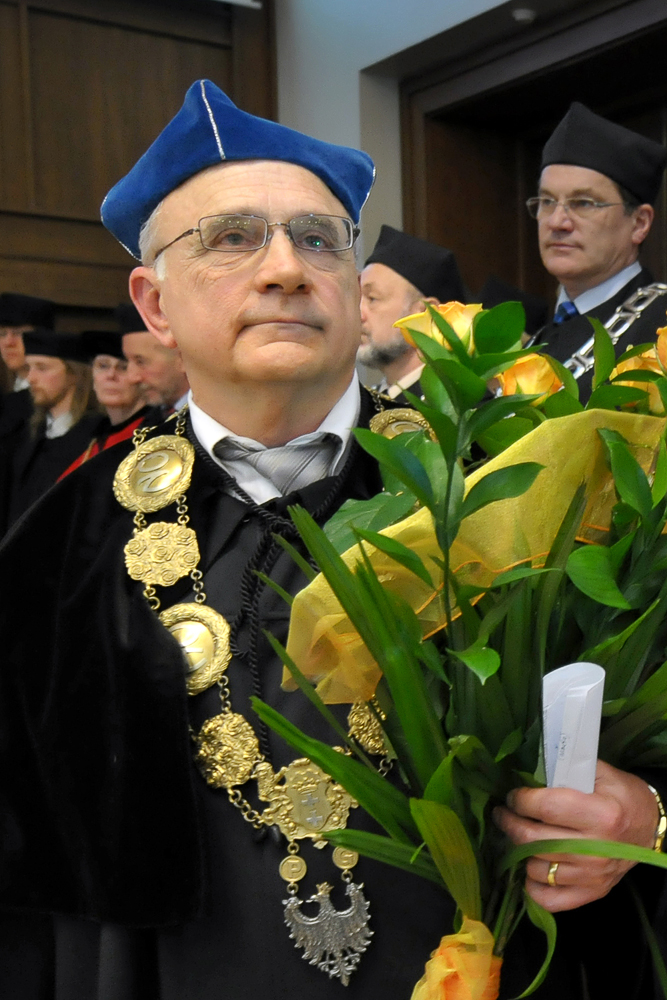
- Born: April 7, 1942 (age 84); DuBois, Pennsylvania
- Education: Pennsylvania State University; Colorado School of Mines
- Known for: flotation process
- Awards: Honorary degree, University of Pretoria (2007); Honorary degree, Gdańsk University of Technology (2010); Distinguished Member of American Institute of Mining, Metallurgical, and Petroleum Engineers; Member of National Academy of Engineering
- Scientific career
- Fields: metallurgical engineering, hydrometallurgy
- Workplaces: Anaconda Company; Lawrence Livermore Laboratory; University of Florida; Virginia Tech; Yunnan University; University of Utah
- Thesis: Solvent extraction of metallic anionic complexes with a quaternary amine (1969)
- Doctoral advisor: Maurice C. Fuerstenau

Jan Dean Miller is an American engineer, currently Distinguished Professor of metallurgical engineering and Ivor D. Thomas Endowed Chair at University of Utah.

== Biography ==
Miller received his B.S. degree from the Pennsylvania State University in 1964, and his M.S. and Ph.D. degrees from the Colorado School of Mines in 1966 and 1969 respectively. He joined the faculty at the University of Utah in 1968, became a full professor in 1978, a distinguished professor in 2008 and served as chair of the Department of Metallurgical Engineering from 2002–2013. In 1993, he was elected a member the National Academy of Engineering for contributions to the fundamental theory and practical technology of flotation, mineral processing, and hydrometallurgy. In 2022 he became a member of the Utah Academy of Engineering and Science. He holds more than 30 patents on methods for processing oil sands, resin recovery from Utah coal, and air-sparged hydrocyclone technology, and has received many professional society awards from the American Institute of Mining, Metallurgical, and Petroleum Engineers and The Minerals, Metals and Materials Society. In 2003 he was recognized by Gdańsk University of Technology with the Medal za Zasługi dla PG for special meritorious contributions for the University, and received an honorary doctorate in 2010. He was also recognized by SME by a special symposium and proceedings in his honor at the 2005 Annual Meeting.

== Publications ==
- The Effect of Drop (Bubble) Size on Advancing and Receding Contact Angles for Heterogeneous and Rough Solid Surfaces as Observed with Sessile-Drop and Captive-Bubble Techniques - Jaroslaw Drelich. Author links open the author workspace.a. Numbers and letters correspond to the affiliation list. Click to expose these in author workspaceJan D. Miller. Author links open the author workspace.a. Numbers and letters correspond to the affiliation list. Click to expose these in author workspaceRobert J. Good. Author links open the author workspace.b
- Particle Interactions in Kaolinite Suspensions and Corresponding Aggregate Structures, V. Gupta, M.A. Hampton, J.R. Stokes, A. V. Nguyen, J.D. Miller, Journal of Colloid and Interface Science, 359(1), pp. 95–103. Published, 07/2011
- Evaluation of Stucco Binder for Agglomeration in the Heap Leaching of Copper Ore, P. Kodali, T. Depci, N. Dhawan, X. Wang, C.L. Lin, J.D. Miller, Minerals Engineering, 24(8), pp. 886–893. Published, 07/2011.
- Production of Trona Concentrates Using High-intensity Dry Magnetic Separation Followed by Flotation, O. Ozdemir, V. Gupta, J.D. Miller, M. Cinar, M.S. Celik, Minerals & Metallurgical Processing, 28(2), pp. 55–61. Published, 05/2011
