= Dubois Historic District (Dubois, Pennsylvania) =

Historic district in Pennsylvania, United States

- U.S. National Register of Historic Places
- U.S. Historic district
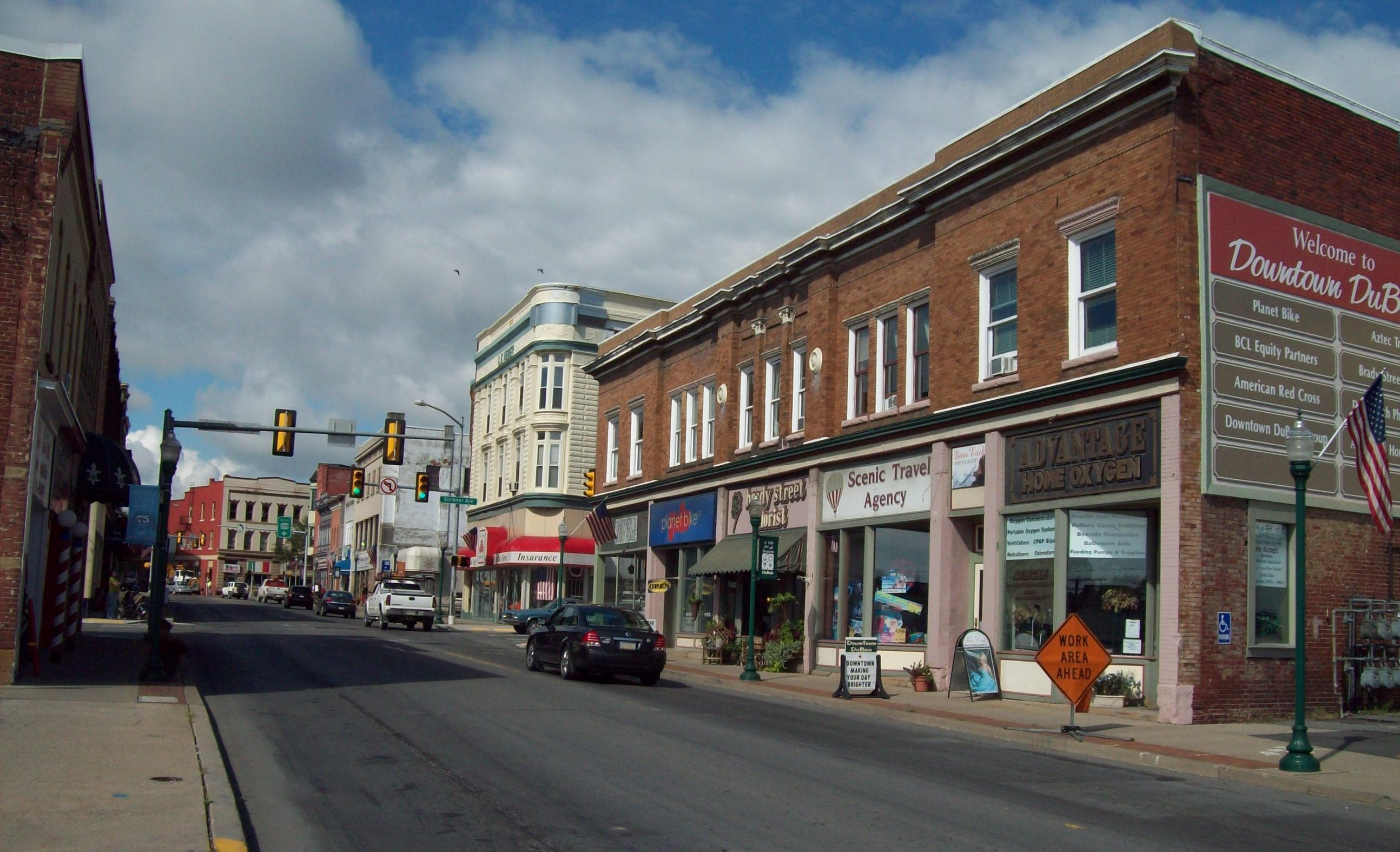
- DuBois Historic District, August 2010

- Location within Pennsylvania Location within the United States
- Location: Roughly along N. and S. Brady Sts., and E. and W. Long Aves., DuBois, Pennsylvania
- Coordinates: 41°7′9″N 78°45′47″W
- Area: 9 acres (3.6 ha)
- Built: 1888
- Architect: Multiple
- Architectural style: Romanesque, Gothic Revival, Italianate
- NRHP reference No.: 97001254
- Added to NRHP: October 24, 1997

Dubois Historic District is a national historic district located at Dubois, Clearfield County, Pennsylvania. The district includes 54 contributing buildings in the central business district of Dubois. The district consists of mostly commercial buildings built after the fire of 1888 and in a variety of popular architectural styles including Gothic Revival architecture, Italianate, and Romanesque Revival. Notable buildings include the Hatten & Munch Building (1897), Moore & Schwern Building (c. 1890), Methodist Episcopal Church (1889), First Baptist Church (1891), Shaw Building (1895), and DuBois Public Library (1923). Located in the district and separately listed was the Commercial Hotel.

It was added to the National Register of Historic Places in 1997.
