= Pennsylvania Route 950 =

State highway in Jefferson County, Pennsylvania, US

Pennsylvania Route 950

Route information
- Maintained by PennDOT
- Length: 6.63 mi (10.67 km)
- Existed: 1928–present

Major junctions
- South end: US 322 in Reynoldsville
- North end: PA 830 in Falls Creek

Location
- Country: United States
- State: Pennsylvania
- Counties: Jefferson

Highway system
- Pennsylvania State Route System; Interstate; US; State; Scenic; Legislative
| ← PA 949 | → PA 951 |

Pennsylvania Route 950 (PA 950) is a 6.63-mile-long (10.67 km) state highway located in Jefferson County in Pennsylvania. The southern terminus is at U.S. Route 322 (US 322) in Reynoldsville. The northern terminus is at PA 830 in Falls Creek.

== Route description ==
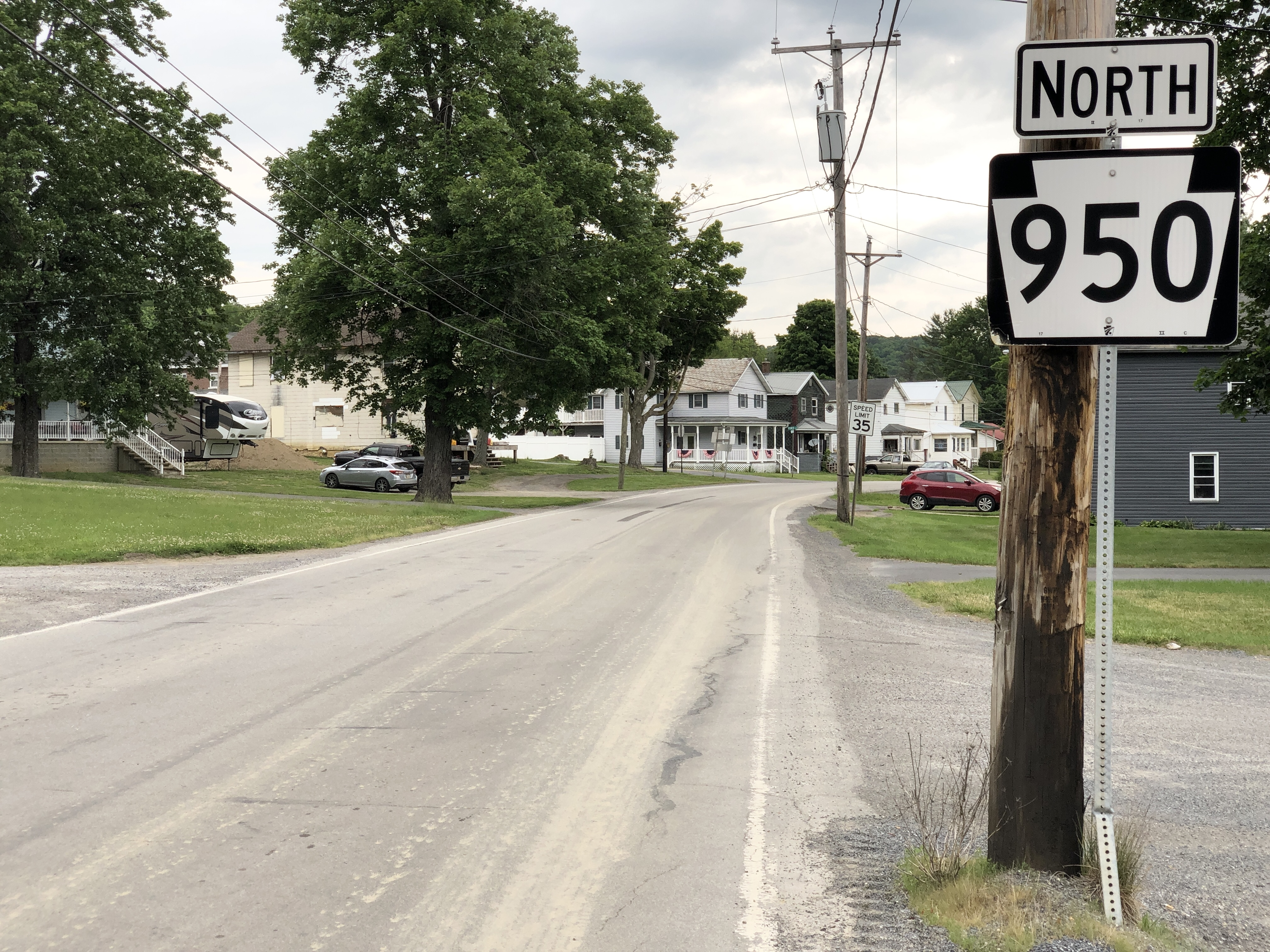
PA 950 northbound in Reynoldsville

PA 950 begins at an intersection with US 322 in the borough of Reynoldsville, heading northeast on two-lane undivided Broadway Street. The road heads through residential areas a short distance to the west of a Buffalo and Pittsburgh Railroad line. The road crosses into Winslow Township and becomes Reynoldsville-Falls Creek Road, continuing through forested areas with occasional development, running to the west of the railroad line and Sandy Lick Creek. PA 950 curves to the east at Sandy Valley and passes through more woodland. Upon reaching the community of Pancoast, the route turns northeast again and continues into the borough of Falls Creek, where the name changes to 3rd Street. In this area, the road passes homes and curves north away from the creek and railroad line. PA 950 reaches its northern terminus at an intersection with PA 830.

== Major intersections ==
The entire route is in Jefferson County.

| Location | mi | km | Destinations | Notes |
|---|---|---|---|---|
| Reynoldsville | 0.00 | 0.00 | US 322 (West Main Street) | Southern terminus |
| Falls Creek | 6.63 | 10.67 | PA 830 (Main Street) to I-80 | Northern terminus |
1.000 mi = 1.609 km; 1.000 km = 0.621 mi
