= Herpel Brothers Foundry and Machine Shop =

- U.S. National Register of Historic Places
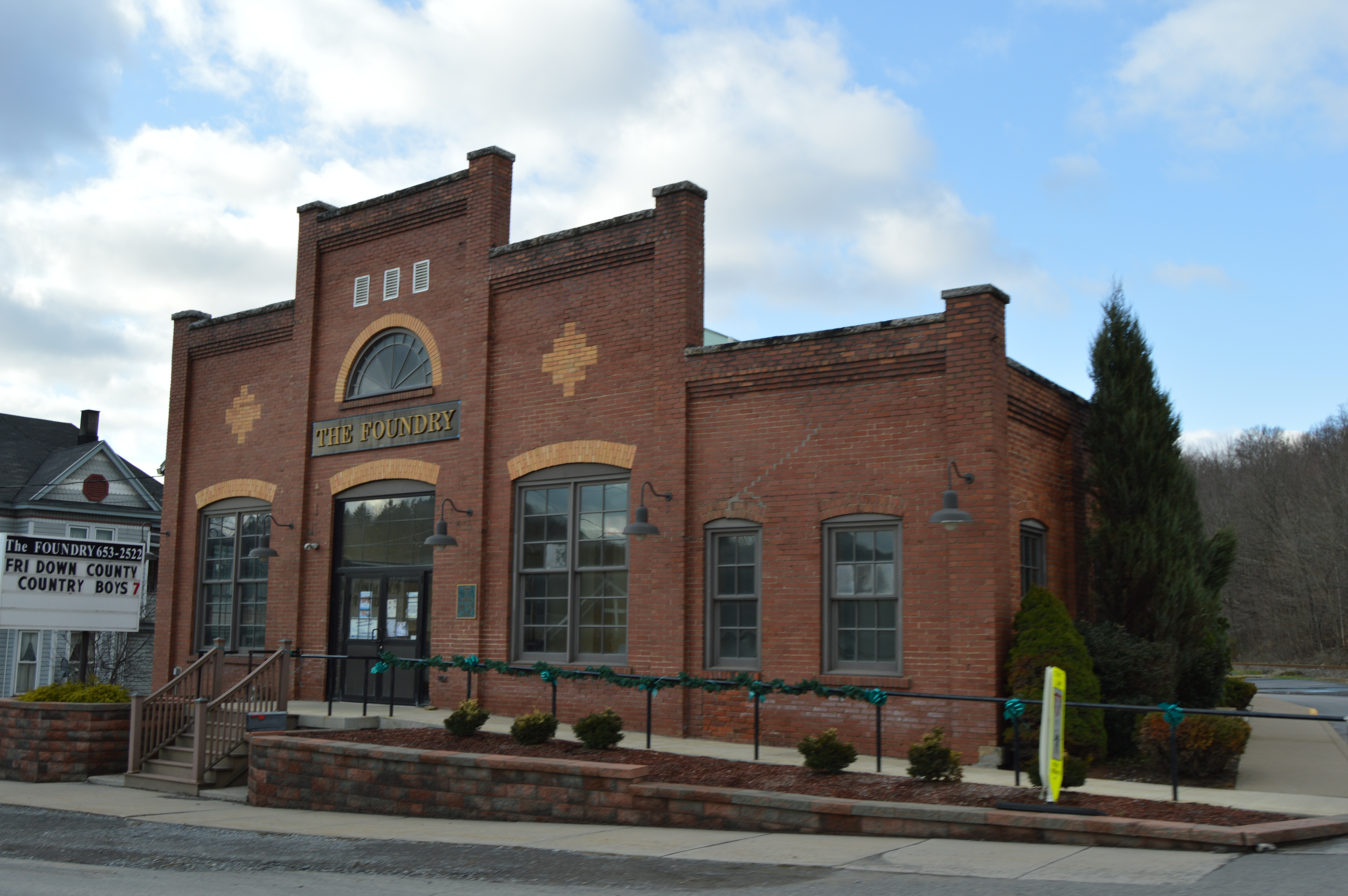
- Western side and front

- Location within Pennsylvania Location within the United States
- Location: 45 W. Main St., Reynoldsville, Pennsylvania
- Coordinates: 41°5′50″N 78°53′37″W
- Area: less than one acre
- Built: c. 1905
- NRHP reference No.: 04000806
- Added to NRHP: August 4, 2004

The Herpel Brothers Foundry and Machine Shop is an historic foundry and machine shop which is located in Reynoldsville, Jefferson County, Pennsylvania.

It was added to the National Register of Historic Places in 2004.

== History and architectural features ==
Built circa 1905, this historic structure is a one-story, red brick building, which sits on an ashlar sandstone foundation. It consists of two sections: the 41-foot-by-81-foot machine shop/foundry building and a 15-foot-by-21-foot office. The machine shop/foundry building features a stepped parapet gable and corrugated metal roof. The building was acquired by Jefferson County and houses the Reynoldsville senior citizen social services center.
