= Frank Fuller (American football) =

American football player (1929–1993)

No. 79, 71, 72
- Positions: Guard, offensive tackle, center, defensive tackle, defensive end

Personal information
- Born: August 8, 1929; DuBois, Pennsylvania, U.S.
- Died: December 14, 1993 (aged 64); Los Angeles, California, U.S.
- Listed height: 6 ft 4 in (1.93 m)
- Listed weight: 244 lb (111 kg)

Career information
- College: Kentucky
- NFL draft: 1952: 26th round, 313th overall pick

Career history
- Los Angeles Rams (1953, 1955–1958); Chicago / St. Louis Cardinals (1959–1962); Philadelphia Eagles (1963)

Awards and highlights
- Pro Bowl (1959)

Career NFL statistics
- Fumble recoveries: 2
- Sacks: 15.5
- Safeties: 1
- Stats at Pro Football Reference

Frank Andrew Fuller (August 8, 1929 – December 14, 1993) was an American professional football player who was a defensive tackle for nine seasons in the National Football League (NFL). He played college football for the Kentucky Wildcats. Fuller played in the NFL for the Los Angeles Rams, Chicago/St. Louis Cardinals, and Philadelphia Eagles.
