= Oklahoma, Clearfield County, Pennsylvania =

Unincorporated community in Pennsylvania, US

Oklahoma (Clearfield County), Pennsylvania
- Census-designated place
- Location in Pennsylvania Oklahoma (the United States)
- Coordinates: 41°6′50″N 78°43′59″W
- Country: United States
- State: Pennsylvania
- County: Clearfield
- Township: Sandy

Area
  - Total: 0.76 sq mi (1.98 km^{2})
  - Land: 0.76 sq mi (1.98 km^{2})
  - Water: 0 sq mi (0.00 km^{2})
- Elevation: 1,440 ft (440 m)

Population (2020)
  - Total: 759
  - Density: 991.7/sq mi (382.88/km^{2})
- Time zone: UTC-5 (Eastern (EST))
  - Summer (DST): UTC-4 (EDT)
- FIPS code: 42-56488
- GNIS feature ID: 1182893

Oklahoma is a census-designated place located in Sandy Township, Clearfield County, in the state of Pennsylvania. As of the 2020 census the population was 759. It is bordered to the northwest by the city of DuBois.

== Demographics ==
Historical population
Census	Pop.	Note	%±
2010	782		—
2020	759		−2.9%
U.S. Decennial Census
