= Falls Creek, Pennsylvania =

Borough in Pennsylvania, US

- Borough
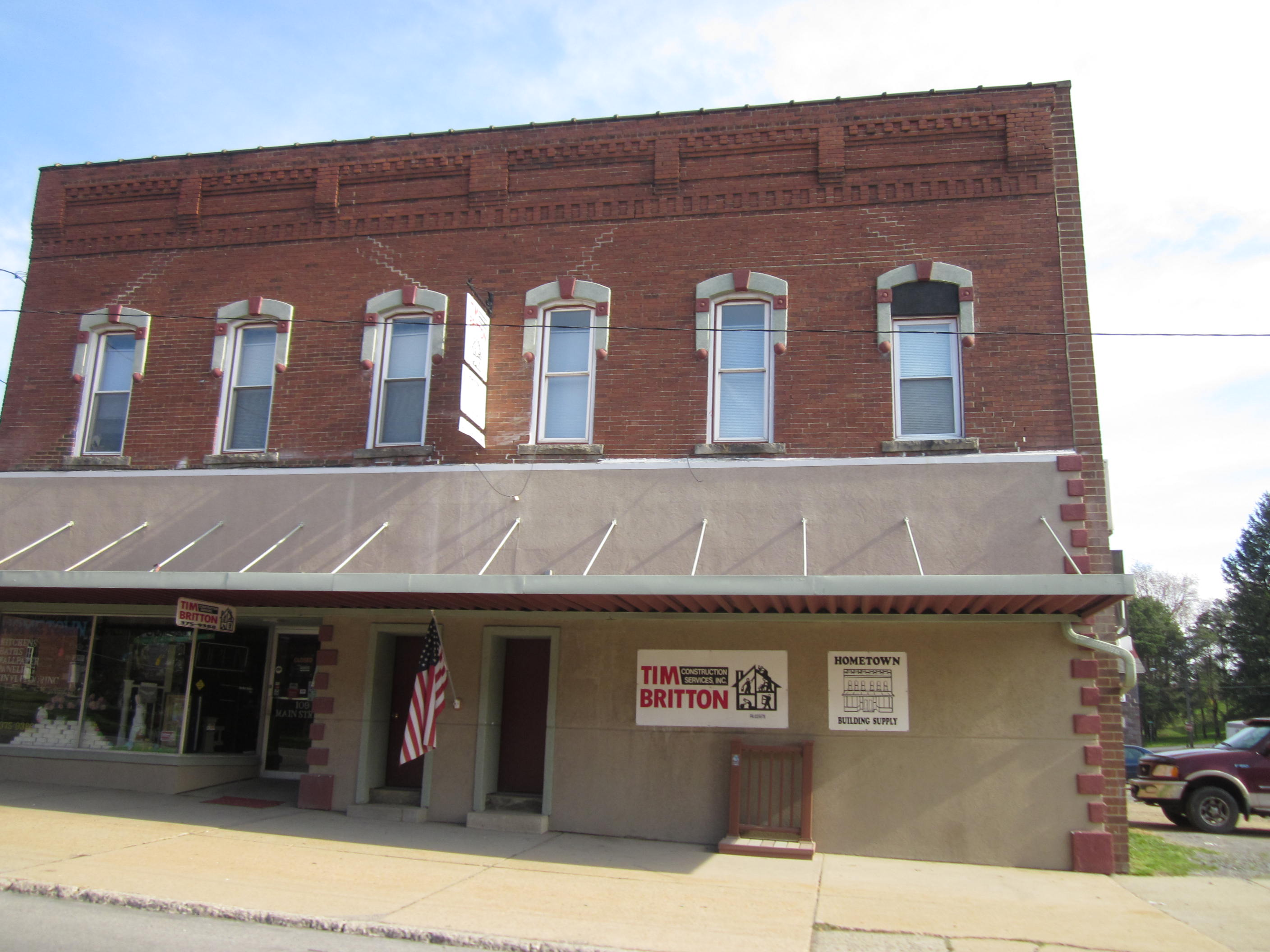
- Downtown Falls Creek

- Location of Falls Creek in Jefferson County, Pennsylvania.

- Location within Pennsylvania
- Coordinates: 41°08′37″N 78°48′12″W
- Country: United States
- State: Pennsylvania
- County: Jefferson
- Incorporated: 1848

Government
  - Type: Borough Council

Area
  - Total: 0.94 sq mi (2.43 km^{2})
  - Land: 0.93 sq mi (2.41 km^{2})
  - Water: 0.0039 sq mi (0.01 km^{2})
- Elevation: 1,460 ft (450 m)

Population (2020)
  - Total: 1,036
  - Density: 1,111.7/sq mi (429.22/km^{2})
- Time zone: UTC-5 (Eastern (EST))
  - Summer (DST): UTC-4 (EDT)
- ZIP code: 15840
- Area code: 814
- FIPS code: 42-25136

Falls Creek (/fɑːlskrɪk/)(/fɑːlzkriːk/) is a borough located in Jefferson County, Pennsylvania. The population was 1,036 at the 2020 census.

== History ==
Falls Creek was platted in 1891, and incorporated in 1900 from part of Washington Township, Jefferson County. The borough is named for the nearby waterway of the same name.

In 1924, the borough annexed a tract in Clearfield County. The borough was situated in both counties until 2025, when the portion in Clearfield County was annexed to Jefferson County.

== Geography ==
Falls Creek is located in eastern Jefferson County at 41°8′37″N 78°48′12″W (41.143688, -78.803252);. Most of the borough is located between Falls Creek to the north and Sandy Lick Creek to the south, into which Falls Creek flows. The creeks are part of the Redbank Creek watershed, draining west to the Allegheny River.

Interstate 80 and U.S. Route 219 intersect just northeast of the borough limits. I-80 leads east 24 miles (39 km) to Clearfield and west 18 miles (29 km) to Brookville, while US-219 leads southeast 3 miles (5 km) into DuBois and north 9 miles (14 km) to Brockway. Pennsylvania Route 830 passes through the center of Falls Creek as Main Street and Washington Avenue, while Pennsylvania Route 950 heads out of the center of town as 3rd Street, leading 7 miles (11 km) southwest to Reynoldsville.

According to the United States Census Bureau, the borough of Falls Creek has a total area of 0.94 square miles (2.43 km^{2}), of which 0.004 square miles (0.01 km^{2}), or 0.48%, is covered with water.

== Demographics ==
Historical population
Census	Pop.	Note	%±
1910	1,204		—
1920	1,364		13.3%
1930	1,231		−9.8%
1940	1,344		9.2%
1950	1,191		−11.4%
1960	1,258		5.6%
1970	1,255		−0.2%
1980	1,208		−3.7%
1990	1,087		−10.0%
2000	983		−9.6%
2010	1,037		5.5%
2020	1,036		−0.1%

As of the census of 2000, there were 983 people, 414 households, and 274 families residing in the borough. The population density was 1,030.4 inhabitants per square mile (397.8/km^{2}). There were 445 housing units at an average density of 466.4 units per square mile (180.1 units/km^{2}). The racial makeup of the borough was 99.08% White, 0.20% Native American, 0.10% Asian, and 0.61% from two or more races. Hispanic or Latino of any race were 0.20% of the population.

There were 414 households, out of which 26.1% had children under the age of 18 living with them, 55.6% were married couples living together, 7.2% had a female householder with no husband present, and 33.8% were non-families. 28.5% of all households were made up of individuals, and 12.6% had someone living alone who was 65 years of age or older. The average household size was 2.37 and the average family size was 2.93.

In the borough the population was spread out, with 23.3% under the age of 18, 7.4% from 18 to 24, 28.0% from 25 to 44, 22.3% from 45 to 64, and 19.0% who were 65 years of age or older. The median age was 38 years. For every 100 females there were 95.0 males. For every 100 females age 18 and over, there were 97.9 males.

The median income for a household in the borough was $30,455, and the median income for a family was $39,219. Males had a median income of $33,417 versus $19,732 for females. The per capita income for the borough was $16,410. About 7.0% of families and 9.5% of the population were below the poverty line, including 9.7% of those under age 18 and 11.5% of those age 65 or over.

== Transportation ==
DuBois Regional Airport is located in Jefferson County's Washington Township, 6 miles (10 km) northwest of Falls Creek.

== See also ==
- Appalachia
- Western Pennsylvania English
