= Sandy Township, Pennsylvania =

Township in Pennsylvania, US

Coordinates: 41°07′00″N 78°42′29″W

- Former Township
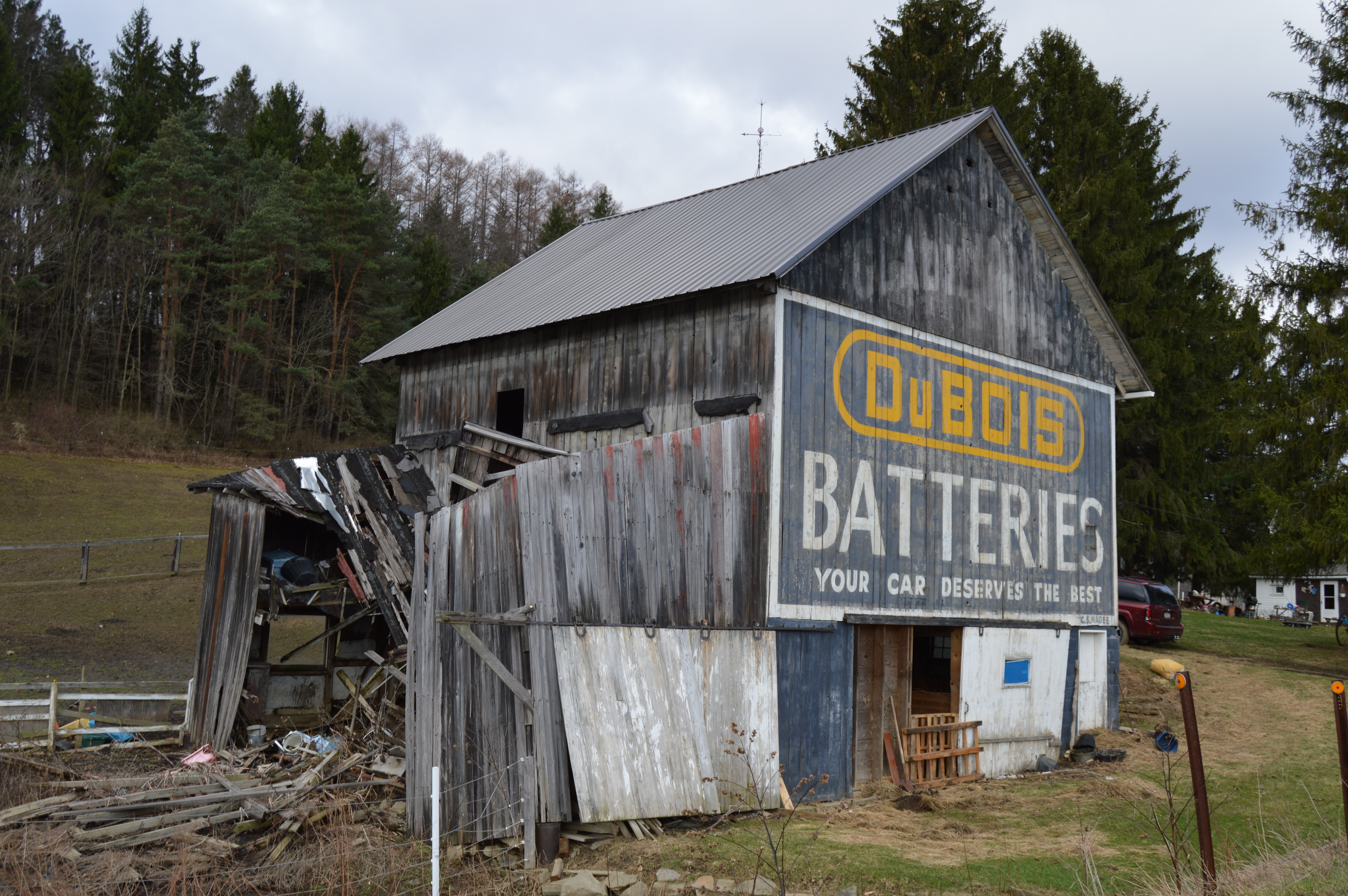
- Barn south of Clearfield, a variant on Mail Pouch tobacco barns

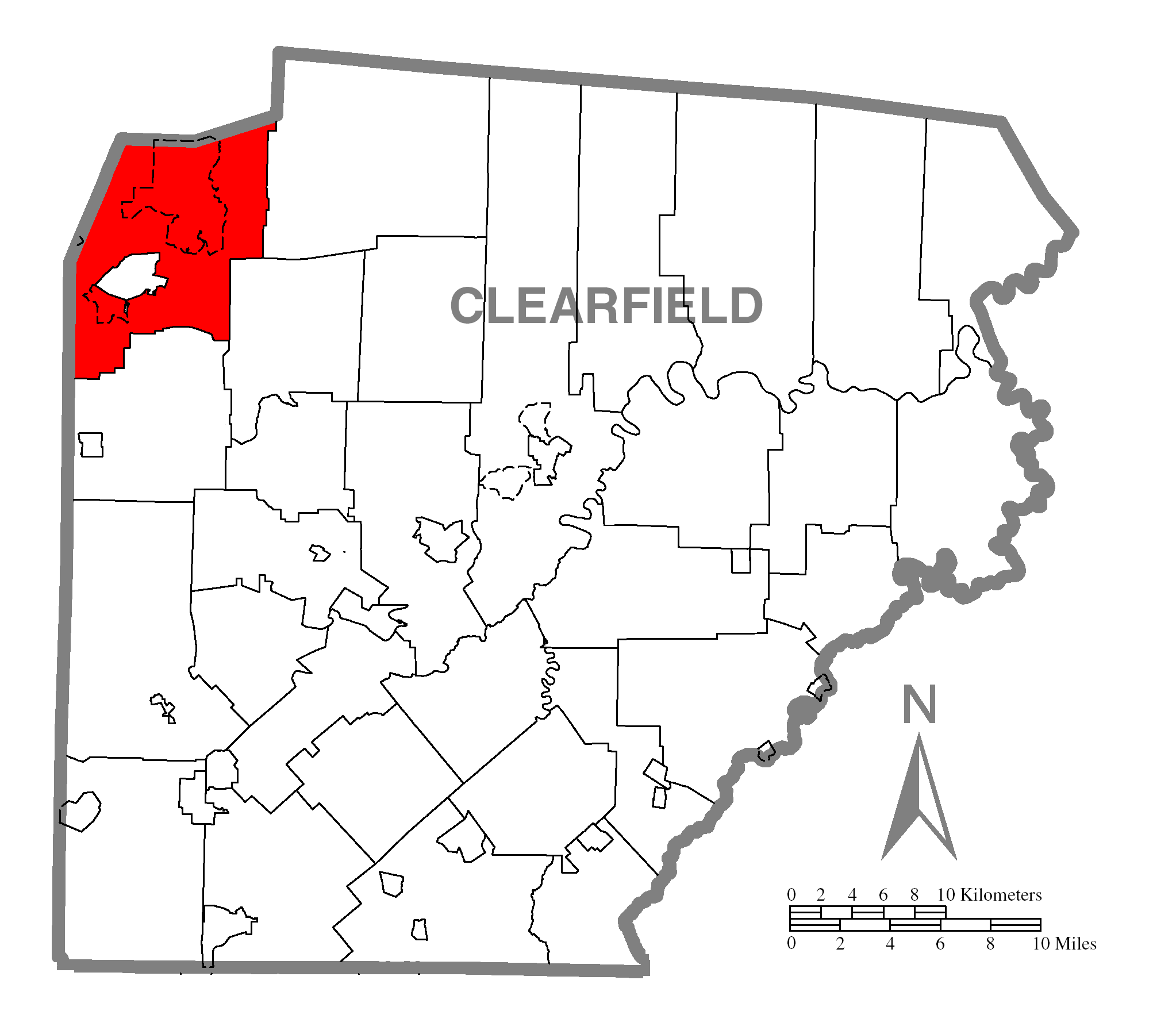
- Map of Clearfield County, Pennsylvania highlighting Sandy Township

- Map of Clearfield County, Pennsylvania
- Country: United States
- State: Pennsylvania
- County: Clearfield
- Settled: 1812
- Incorporated: 1878

Area
  - Total: 52.99 sq mi (137.25 km^{2})
  - Land: 51.96 sq mi (134.58 km^{2})
  - Water: 1.03 sq mi (2.68 km^{2})

Population (2020)
  - Total: 11,852 ▲
  - Estimate (2021): 11,776
  - Density: 205.1/sq mi (79.18/km^{2})
- Time zone: UTC-5 (Eastern (EST))
  - Summer (DST): UTC-4 (EDT)
- Area code: 814
- FIPS code: 42-033-67792

Sandy Township was a township in Clearfield County, Pennsylvania, United States. The population was 11,852 at the 2020 census.

Over the years there had been numerous unsuccessful attempts in 1989, 1995, and 2002 to combine the township with the City of DuBois, but in 2021 voters in both municipalities successfully voted to consolidate into a new third class city, which took effect January 5, 2026. Combined, the population of DuBois and Sandy Township is approximately 18,000 people.

== Geography ==
According to the United States Census Bureau, the township has a total area of 52.8 square miles (136.7 km^{2}), of which 51.8 square miles (134.1 km^{2}) is land and 1.0 square mile (2.6 km^{2}) (1.88%) is water.

== Communities ==
- Adrian Furnace
- Clear Run
- Gelnett
- Iselin Heights
- Oklahoma
- Narrows Creek
- Sabula
- Sandy
- Treasure Lake
- West Liberty

== Demographics ==
Historical population
| Census | Pop. | Note | %± |
|---|---|---|---|
| 2000 | 11,556 | | — |
| 2010 | 10,625 | | −8.1% |
| 2020 | 11,852 | | 11.5% |
| 2021 (est.) | 11,776 | | −0.6% |
U.S. Decennial Census

As of the census of 2000, there were 11,556 people, 4,387 households, and 3,299 families residing in the township. The population density was 223.2 inhabitants per square mile (86.2/km^{2}). There were 5,028 housing units at an average density of 97.1 per square mile (37.5/km^{2}). The racial makeup of the township was 98.58% White, 0.20% African American, 0.06% Native American, 0.61% Asian, 0.03% Pacific Islander, 0.07% from other races, and 0.46% from two or more races. Hispanic or Latino of any race were 0.45% of the population.

There were 4,387 households, out of which 31.2% had children under the age of 18 living with them, 65.3% were married couples living together, 6.8% had a female householder with no husband present, and 24.8% were non-families. 21.8% of all households were made up of individuals, and 9.2% had someone living alone who was 65 years of age or older. The average household size was 2.50 and the average family size was 2.91.

In the township the population was spread out, with 22.8% under the age of 18, 5.5% from 18 to 24, 27.2% from 25 to 44, 25.1% from 45 to 64, and 19.5% who were 65 years of age or older. The median age was 42 years. For every 100 females there were 93.4 males. For every 100 females age 18 and over, there were 89.9 males.

The median income for a household in the township was $42,450, and the median income for a family was $49,013. Males had a median income of $38,185 versus $24,042 for females. The per capita income for the township was $20,420. About 5.0% of families and 7.2% of the population were below the poverty line, including 9.3% of those under age 18 and 6.4% of those age 65 or over.

== Education ==
- Sandy Township is served by the DuBois Area School District.
