= Phi Sigma Pi =

American coed college honor fraternity

- ΦΣΠ
- Founded: February 14, 1916; 110 years ago University of Central Missouri
- Type: Honor
- Affiliation: PFA
- Former affiliation: PIC
- Status: Active
- Emphasis: Scholarship
- Scope: National
- Motto: "Improving Humanity with Honor"
- Pillars: Scholarship, Leadership, and Fellowship
- Member badge
- Colors: Purple and Gold
- Publication: Purple and Gold; The Lampadion
- Philanthropy: Hugh O'Brian Youth Leadership Foundation
- Chapters: 135 Collegiate, 17 Alumni
- Members: 50,000 lifetime
- Headquarters: 2119 Ambassador Circle; Lancaster, Pennsylvania 17603; United States
- Website: www.phisigmapi.org

Phi Sigma Pi National Honor Fraternity (ΦΣΠ) is a gender-inclusive and mixed-sex national honor fraternity based in the United States. The fraternity is a 501(c)(3) not-for-profit organization incorporated in the state of Pennsylvania to foster scholarship, leadership, and fellowship. Phi Sigma Pi chapters are at more than 140 four-year collegiate institutions.

== History ==
Interested in creating an honor society at State Teachers College at Warrensburg (now the University of Central Missouri), professors Dr. Eldo L. Hendricks, Dr. Claude A. Phillips, and Dr. Clarence H. McClure contacted Phi Beta Kappa. Phi Beta Kappa policy stated that chapters could only be established on campuses of qualified liberal arts colleges and universities; the State Teachers College at Warrensburg did not meet this requirement. They also contacted Omicron Delta Kappa and nationally known social fraternities, which all had the same requirements as Phi Beta Kappa.

On February 14, 1916, Hendricks, Phillips, and McClure founded a new fraternity named Phi Sigma Pi Honorary Professional Fraternity when they could not find an existing fraternity to establish a chapter on their campus. Hendricks was the first to sign the fraternity's roll book, becoming known as Alpha 1, followed by Phillips and McClure. Its founders included three professors (the founding fathers) and ten male students.

- Dr. Eldo L. Hendricks
- Dr. Claude A. Phillips
- Dr. Clarence H. McClure
- Alfred V. Thayer
- J. A. Leach
- Roland W. Grinstead
- Ray F. Perkins
- W. C. Fowler
- R. G. Bigelow
- Arthur Kresge
- John Doak
- Harold Patterson
- Harry Hill

Phi Sigma Pi's established ideals for its members called the Tripod: scholarship, leadership and fellowship: The Alpha chapter inducted twelve new members the next year and continued to grow. In 1921, the fraternity became national, adding the Beta chapter at Northeast Missouri State University and the Gamma chapter at Bradley University. Other chapters were added during the 1920s and early 1930s.

Several chapters closed throughout the 1930s during the Great Depression. In 1934, Phi Sigma Pi began negotiating a merger with Kappa Phi Kappa, a larger educational fraternity. At the time, Phi Sigma Pi had 18 chapters and 500 members, and Kappa Phi Kappa had more than 40 chapters. In June 1934, the Northwestern Oklahoma State University chapter voted to join Kappa Phi Kappa.

In late 1942, the remaining fifteen chapters went inactive because of World War II. Many schools had such low enrollments that the state legislatures considered closing them permanently. The war also prevented the 1943 Grand Chapter Convention, where the election of new National Officers would have taken place. The existing officers continued to guide the fraternity and its ultimate reorganization until the next Grand Chapter meeting could be held.

By the fall of 1946, all but one of the chapters before the war were reactivated. The exception was the Mu chapter at State Teachers College. It took the fraternity decades to recover the momentum that it had gained throughout the 1920s and 1930s.

Since the fraternity had gone national in 1921, the leaders at the national level had been faculty advisors of the chapters and active alumni. By 1950, contact with alumni was critically affected by the war, and the faculty advisors who guided the fraternity through two decades were ready to retire. By 1954, Clair B. Wilson, James M. McCallister (Alpha), James K. Stoner, and long-time regional director Simon S. Shearer (Omicron) were gone. Death claimed Beecher Flanagan in 1950 and Sanders P. McComsey (Sigma) in 1955.

The regional director system was retired to utilize the leadership of the national officer positions. At the same time, The Lampadion ceased publication, leaving the Purple & Gold as the sole communication between the chapters and the national office. The fraternity was incorporated nationally in Illinois on April 25, 1949.

Two of the fraternity's most dedicated national officers from this era were Joseph Torchia (Sigma) and Richard C. Todd (Sigma). Torchia was employed at his alma mater as an associate professor of education from 1946 to 1975. The Outstanding Chapter Award was created in 1957 and was renamed the Joseph Torchia Outstanding Chapter Award in 1970. Todd served as the Tau chapter advisor for many years and held virtually every officer position on the national council. At East Carolina University, Todd was an outstanding history professor and advisor to many undergraduate organizations. Dr. Todd and his wife established several scholarships, including Phi Sigma Pi's Richard C. Todd & Clauda Pennock Todd Tripod Scholarship.

With the assistance of Henry W. Olsen (Rho); Leroy G. Pulver (Pi); Perry McCandless (Alpha); and Abram Foster (Sigma), Todd, and Torchia led the fraternity to the realization that while the fraternity was stable, stagnation was setting in. At the October 1, 1966 Grand Chapter Convention in Washington D.C., president Abram Foster said, "We have remained stagnant and this is not good. We are losing the opportunity to spread the purposes of Phi Sigma Pi. We must act." At the time, colleges and universities were openly discouraging social fraternities, while promoting honor organizations and scholarships.

Seeing that Phi Sigma Pi had always placed exceptional emphasis on scholarship—the premise being that good teachers were also good scholars—its leaders suggested an honor fraternity model which stressed scholarship, leadership, and fellowship. This concept preserved the tripod and created new expansion opportunities.

Thus, the fraternity evolved from being an honorary professional fraternity to a professional education fraternity, and then, in 1966, into an honor fraternity for all disciplines. Formerly all-male, Phi Sigma Pi first admitted women in 1977. Since 1996, the fraternity's national office is located in Lancaster, Pennsylvania. The fraternity publishes the Purple and Gold magazine for collegiate members and The Lampadion for alumni.

== Symbols ==
The society's badge is a monogram of the letters ΦΣΠ linked diagonally. The Phi may be enhanced with pearls. The Centennial badge allowed for contrasting purple stones on the center stroke of the Phi.

Distinguished service keys bearing the coat of arms are awarded to chapter presidents and secretaries who perform their duties faithfully and efficiently by the Grand Chapter.

The fraternity's colors are purple and gold.

== Chapters ==
The fraternity has more than 140 chapters located across the United States. The fraternity has several alumni chapters, including Baltimore Metro Area, Capital, Delaware Valley, Middle Tennessee, New York Metro Area, and Southern Appalachian. There are also three alumni associations, including Detroit Area, Greater Boston, and Pittsburgh Area.

== Members ==
Phi Sigma Pi became co-educational in 1977. Phi Sigma Pi membership is open to students at four-year collegiate institutions who have earned a 3.0 cumulative grade point average (on a 4.00 scale, where 4.00 is equivalent to a grade of "A") for at least one semester or a quarter of collegiate work. Chapters can raise this requirement, but cannot lower it. Only a handful of new members are accepted each semester, meaning that the bid process is competitive, and meeting the GPA requirement does not guarantee membership.

== Activities ==
=== Philanthropy ===
Between 2007 and 2014, Phi Sigma Pi chapters raised $67,104.47 for the Teach For America National Philanthropy and sent 672 members and alumni to Teach for America regions and schools. In 2015, Hugh O'Brian Youth Leadership Foundation (HOBY) became Phi Sigma Pi's National Philanthropy.

=== Scholarships ===
The fraternity offers several scholarships for its members, including The Richard Cecil Todd and Clauda Pennock Todd Tripod Scholarship, the Rolla F. Wood Graduate Scholarship, and the Lloyd G. Balfour Fellowship.

== Notable members ==
- Bob Boozer, athletic director and athletics coach
- Jeremy Moss, Michigan Senate and Michigan House of Representatives
- Jordan Wall, actor
