= Commercial Hotel (DuBois, Pennsylvania) =

Historic hotel and theater complex in DuBois, Pennsylvania

- U.S. National Register of Historic Places
- Commercial Hotel, 1910

- Location within Pennsylvania Location within the United States
- Location: Long and Brady Aves., DuBois, Pennsylvania
- Coordinates: 41°07′07″N 78°45′43″W
- Area: less than one acre
- Built: 1889
- Architect: Howard, Russell C.; Et al.
- NRHP reference No.: 85003507
- Added to NRHP: November 13, 1985

Commercial Hotel, also known as the General Pershing Hotel, was a historic hotel and theater complex located in DuBois, Pennsylvania, United States. The four story brick structure opened as a two-story hotel with 58 rooms in 1889. It was enlarged to four stories and 100 rooms with an expansion in 1901. The 700 seat Harris-DuBois Theater, later the DuBois Playhouse, opened in 1937. The building has been demolished.

It was listed on the National Register of Historic Places on November 13, 1985.

== See also ==
- National Register of Historic Places listings in Clearfield County, Pennsylvania

== See also ==
- National Register of Historic Places listings in Clearfield County, Pennsylvania
