= Allens Mills, Pennsylvania =

Unincorporated community in Pennsylvania, US

Coordinates: 41°11′58″N 78°54′27″W

Allens Mills is an unincorporated community in Jefferson County, in the U.S. state of Pennsylvania.

== History ==
Allens Mills (formerly rendered Allen's Mill) was laid out by Jere Allen, and named for him. A post office called Allens Mills was in operation from 1874 until 1928.
