= Emerickville, Pennsylvania =

Unincorporated community in Pennsylvania, U.S.

Coordinates: 41°07′57″N 78°59′17″W

Emerickville is an unincorporated community in Jefferson County, in the U.S. state of Pennsylvania.

== History ==
Emerickville contained a post office between 1854 and 1906.
