= DuBois, Pennsylvania =

City in Pennsylvania, US

- City
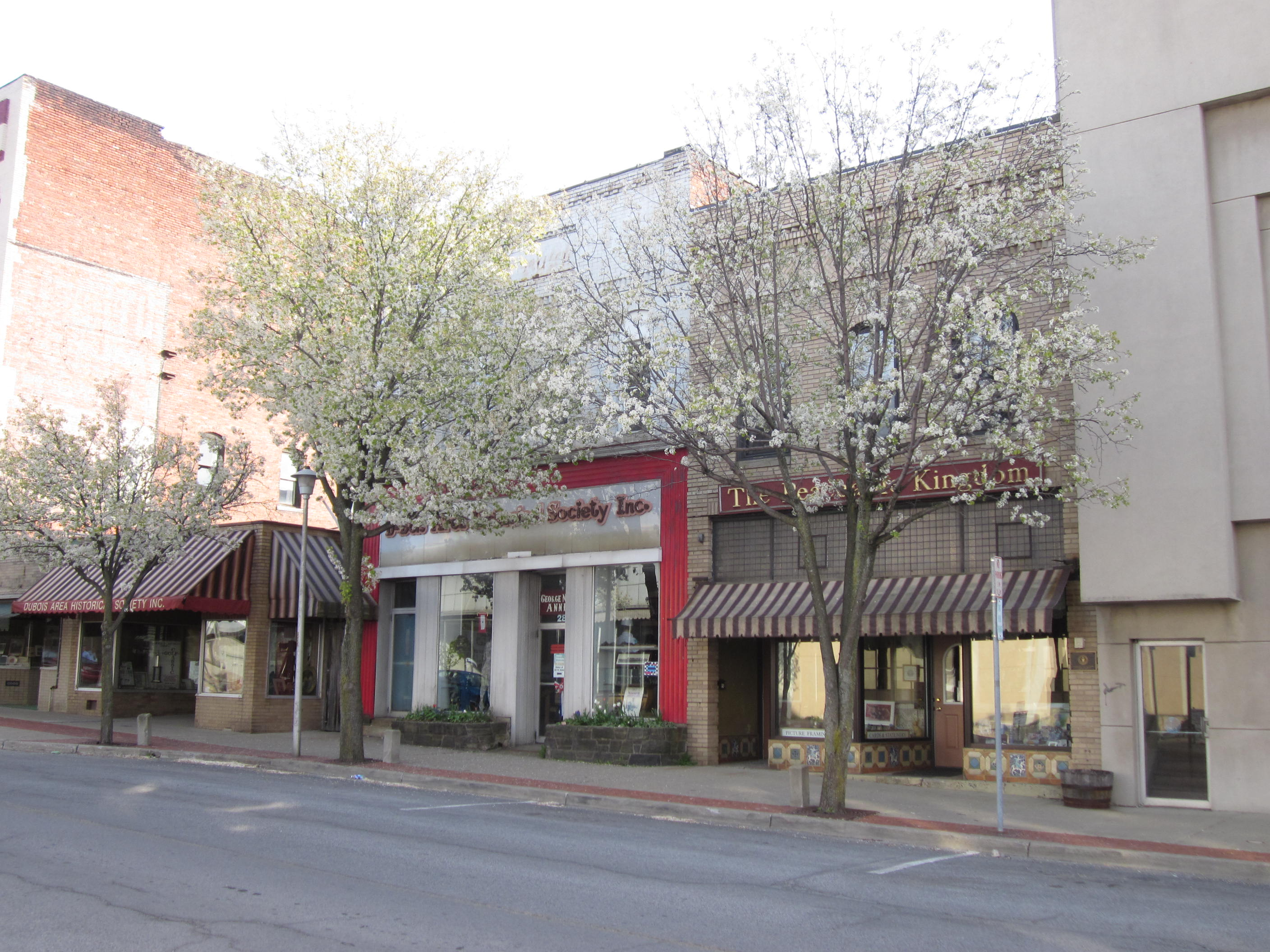
- Downtown DuBois

- Flag Seal Logo

- Map showing Clearfield County in Pennsylvania
- Interactive map of DuBois, Pennsylvania
- Pennsylvania
- Coordinates: 41°07′13″N 78°45′43″W
- Country: United States
- State: Pennsylvania
- County: Clearfield
- Settled: 1812
- Laid out: 1872
- Incorporated (borough): 1881
- Incorporated (city): 1914

Government
  - Type: City Council
  - Mayor: Barry Abbott

Area
  - Total: 3.26 sq mi (8.44 km^{2})
  - Land: 3.22 sq mi (8.34 km^{2})
  - Water: 0.039 sq mi (0.10 km^{2})
- Elevation: 1,410 ft (430 m)

Population (2020)
  - Total: 7,510
  - Density: 2,333.3/sq mi (900.88/km^{2})
- Time zone: UTC−5 (Eastern (EST))
  - Summer (DST): UTC−4 (EDT)
- ZIP Code: 15801
- Area code: 814
- FIPS code: 42-20136
- Website: www.duboispa.gov

DuBois (/ˌduːˈbɔɪz/ doo-BOYZ) is a city and the most populous community in Clearfield County, Pennsylvania, United States. DuBois is located approximately 100 miles (160 km) northeast of Pittsburgh. The population was 7,510 as of the 2020 census, though the new population post-merger is roughly 18,000 people, which will be reflected in post 2026 censuses. It is the principal city in the DuBois, PA Micropolitan Statistical Area. DuBois is also one of two principal cities, the other being State College, that make up the larger State College-DuBois, PA Combined Statistical Area.

== History ==
Settled in 1812 and platted in 1872, DuBois was incorporated as a borough in 1881 and as a city in 1914.

The town was founded by John Rumbarger, for whom the town was originally named. The Rumbarger Cemetery is all that survives of John Rumbarger's "original settlement" in the city of DuBois. The town was later renamed for local lumber magnate John DuBois, who came from a longstanding American family of French Huguenot descent. Many of the town's original buildings and homes were funded and or donated by Mr. DuBois's lumber mill. In 1938, his nephew, John E. DuBois, donated the family mansion and estate as a permanent home for the DuBois Campus of Penn State University. While DuBois was founded as a lumber town, the mining of bituminous coal quickly became the chief industry in DuBois.

Over the years there had been numerous unsuccessful attempts in 1989, 1995, and 2002 to combine the city with the surrounding Sandy Township, but in 2021 voters in both municipalities successfully voted to consolidate into a new third class city, which took effect January 5, 2026. Combined, the population of DuBois and Sandy Township is approximately 18,000 people. The combined city will keep the name DuBois.

The Commercial Hotel, since demolished, was listed on the National Register of Historic Places in 1985, and the DuBois Historic District was listed in 1997.

== Geography ==
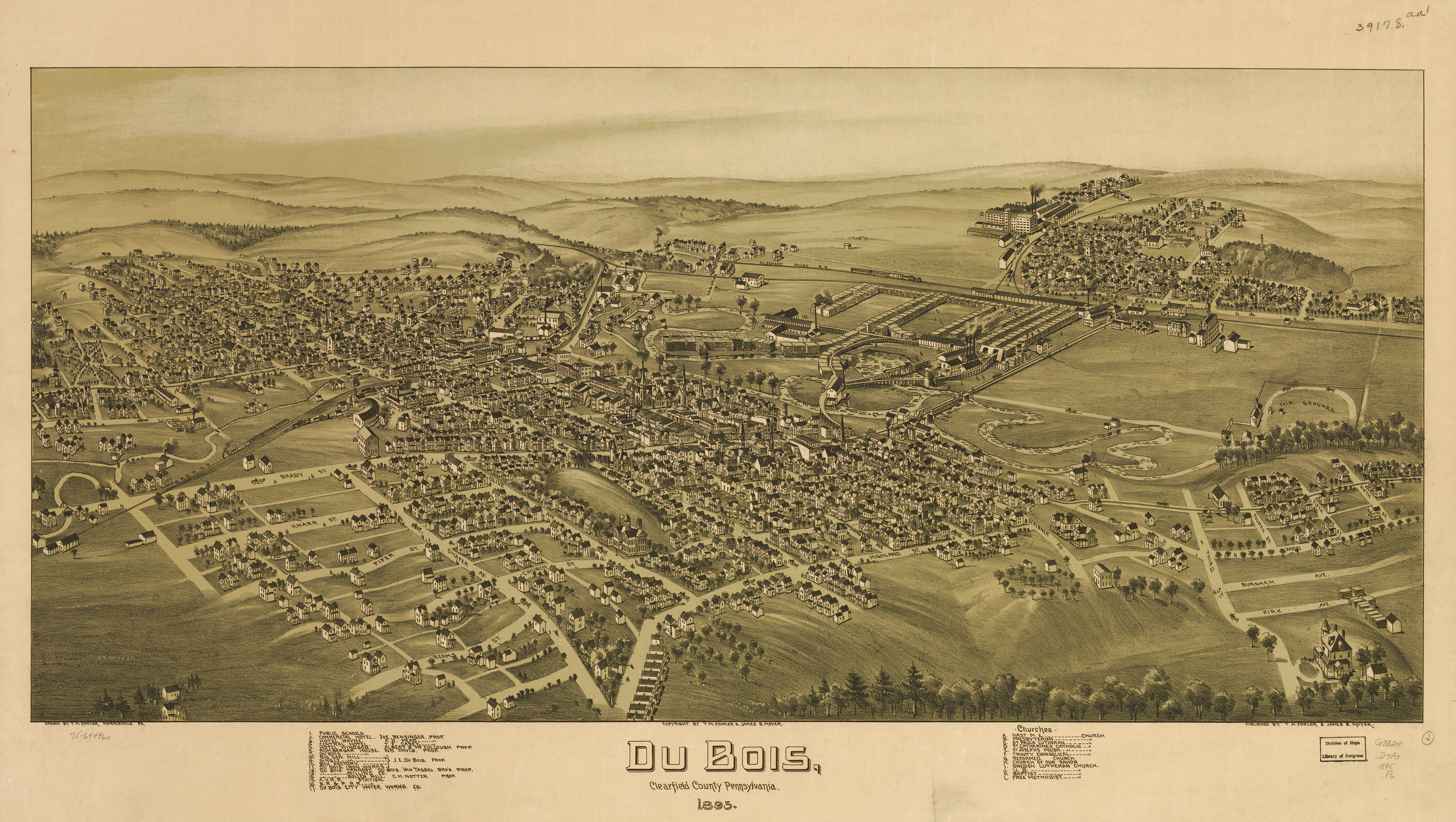
1895 bird's-eye view of DuBois

DuBois is located in northwestern Clearfield County at 41°7′13″N 78°45′43″W (41.120304, -78.761962). Pre-2026 consolidation it was surrounded by Sandy Township. It is bordered to the southwest by the community of Sandy and to the southeast by the community of Oklahoma.

According to the U.S. Census Bureau, the city has an area of 3.2 square miles (8.3 km^{2}), of which 3.2 square miles (8.2 km^{2}) is land and 0.04 square miles (0.1 km^{2}), or 1.24%, is water. Sandy Lick Creek flows through the city from east to west. It is a tributary of Redbank Creek, part of the Allegheny River/Ohio River basin.

== Climate ==
DuBois has a humid continental climate (Köppen Dfb). Winters are cold with periods of heavy snowfall, while summers are warm and humid. The monthly daily average temperature in July is 68.5 °F (20.3 °C), while the same figure for January is 23.6 °F (−4.7 °C); the annual mean is 47.0 °F (8.33 °C).

Climate data for DuBois, Pennsylvania (1991–2020 normals, extremes 1962–present)
Month	Jan	Feb	Mar	Apr	May	Jun	Jul	Aug	Sep	Oct	Nov	Dec	Year
Record high °F (°C)	66 (19)	73 (23)	79 (26)	88 (31)	89 (32)	92 (33)	101 (38)	96 (36)	91 (33)	86 (30)	79 (26)	72 (22)	101 (38)
Mean maximum °F (°C)	55.6 (13.1)	55.5 (13.1)	67.2 (19.6)	78.2 (25.7)	84.0 (28.9)	86.5 (30.3)	88.2 (31.2)	86.9 (30.5)	83.9 (28.8)	76.3 (24.6)	67.4 (19.7)	56.5 (13.6)	89.5 (31.9)
Mean daily maximum °F (°C)	31.5 (−0.3)	34.7 (1.5)	44.2 (6.8)	57.8 (14.3)	68.2 (20.1)	75.4 (24.1)	79.3 (26.3)	77.9 (25.5)	71.0 (21.7)	59.4 (15.2)	46.9 (8.3)	36.3 (2.4)	56.9 (13.8)
Daily mean °F (°C)	24.5 (−4.2)	26.8 (−2.9)	35.2 (1.8)	47.2 (8.4)	57.4 (14.1)	65.1 (18.4)	69.1 (20.6)	67.7 (19.8)	61.0 (16.1)	50.1 (10.1)	39.2 (4.0)	29.8 (−1.2)	47.8 (8.8)
Mean daily minimum °F (°C)	17.4 (−8.1)	18.8 (−7.3)	26.1 (−3.3)	36.5 (2.5)	46.6 (8.1)	54.8 (12.7)	58.8 (14.9)	57.6 (14.2)	51.0 (10.6)	40.7 (4.8)	31.5 (−0.3)	23.3 (−4.8)	38.6 (3.7)
Mean minimum °F (°C)	−2.8 (−19.3)	−0.9 (−18.3)	6.2 (−14.3)	21.0 (−6.1)	30.7 (−0.7)	40.2 (4.6)	47.9 (8.8)	46.7 (8.2)	37.4 (3.0)	27.5 (−2.5)	16.0 (−8.9)	6.3 (−14.3)	−6.0 (−21.1)
Record low °F (°C)	−26 (−32)	−21 (−29)	−7 (−22)	8 (−13)	22 (−6)	32 (0)	40 (4)	34 (1)	29 (−2)	16 (−9)	2 (−17)	−14 (−26)	−26 (−32)
Average precipitation inches (mm)	2.93 (74)	2.38 (60)	3.26 (83)	3.72 (94)	3.69 (94)	4.66 (118)	4.36 (111)	3.89 (99)	3.96 (101)	3.40 (86)	3.21 (82)	2.96 (75)	42.42 (1,077)
Average precipitation days (≥ 0.01 in)	13.6	12.5	14.1	15.3	15.3	14.5	14.2	13.5	13.3	14.7	13.5	14.1	168.6
Source: NOAA

== Demographics ==
Historical population
Census	Pop.	Note	%±
1880	2,718		—
1890	6,149		126.2%
1900	9,375		52.5%
1910	12,623		34.6%
1920	13,681		8.4%
1930	11,595		−15.2%
1940	12,080		4.2%
1950	11,497		−4.8%
1960	10,667		−7.2%
1970	10,112		−5.2%
1980	9,290		−8.1%
1990	8,286		−10.8%
2000	8,123		−2.0%
2010	7,794		−4.1%
2020	7,510		−3.6%

As of 2013, the Medium Household Income was $34,340. Ninety five percent of adults 25 and over have a high school diploma, 22% hold a bachelor's degree or higher and 10% have a Graduate Degree.

=== 2020 census ===
As of the 2020 census, DuBois had a population of 7,510. The median age was 40.2 years. 20.7% of residents were under the age of 18 and 18.3% of residents were 65 years of age or older. For every 100 females there were 97.4 males, and for every 100 females age 18 and over there were 96.2 males age 18 and over.

100.0% of residents lived in urban areas, while 0.0% lived in rural areas.

There were 3,436 households in DuBois, of which 24.9% had children under the age of 18 living in them. Of all households, 35.8% were married-couple households, 23.9% were households with a male householder and no spouse or partner present, and 32.0% were households with a female householder and no spouse or partner present. About 38.9% of all households were made up of individuals and 15.2% had someone living alone who was 65 years of age or older.

There were 3,823 housing units, of which 10.1% were vacant. The homeowner vacancy rate was 1.1% and the rental vacancy rate was 7.9%.

Racial composition as of the 2020 census
Race	Number	Percent
White	6,944	92.5%
Black or African American	71	0.9%
American Indian and Alaska Native	10	0.1%
Asian	88	1.2%
Native Hawaiian and Other Pacific Islander	0	0.0%
Some other race	62	0.8%
Two or more races	335	4.5%
Hispanic or Latino (of any race)	127	1.7%

=== 2010 census ===
As of the census of 2010, there were 7,794 people. The racial makeup of the city was 96.3% White, 0.60% African American, 0.10% Native American, 0.90% Asian, 0.0% Pacific Islander, 1.1% from two or more races, and 1.2% Hispanic or Latino.

In the city, the population was spread out, with 22.4% under the age of 18 and 16.4 who were 65 years of age or older. Females were 52.5% of the population.

=== 2000 census ===
As of the census of 2000, there were 8,123 people, 3,614 households, and 2,099 families residing in the City of DuBois. The population density was 2,429.8 inhabitants per square mile (938.2/km^{2}). There were 3,956 housing units at an average density of 1,183.4 per square mile (456.9/km^{2}). The racial makeup of the city was 98.18% White, 0.30% African American, 0.10% Native American, 0.53% Asian, 0.05% Pacific Islander, 0.09% from other races, and 0.76% from two or more races. Hispanic or Latino of any race were 0.42% of the population.

There were 3,614 households, out of which 26.1% had children under the age of 18 living with them, 42.6% were married couples living together, 12.0% had a female householder with no husband present, and 41.9% were non-families. 36.2% of all households were made up of individuals, and 18.2% had someone living alone who was 65 years of age or older. The average household size was 2.23 and the average family size was 2.91.

In the city, the population was spread out, with 23.1% under the age of 18, 10.0% from 18 to 24, 26.6% from 25 to 44, 20.7% from 45 to 64, and 19.6% who were 65 years of age or older. The median age was 38 years. For every 100 females, there were 87.2 males. For every 100 females age 18 and over, there were 83.5 males.

The median income for a household in the city was $27,748, and the median income for a family was $36,575. Males had a median income of $29,306 versus $18,601 for females. The per capita income for the city was $17,079. About 12.5% of families and 15.9% of the population were below the poverty line, including 23.4% of those under age 18 and 8.1% of those age 65 or over.

== Transportation and economy ==
=== Airport ===
DuBois is served by DuBois Regional Airport (IATA: DUJ), located 10 miles (16 km) northwest of town in Jefferson County. It is owned and operated by the Clearfield-Jefferson Counties Regional Airport Authority, based at the airport. The airport serves general aviation, and Southern Airways Express offers scheduled non-stop service to Washington Dulles International Airport and Pittsburgh International Airport under the Essential Air Service.

=== Highway system ===
The city is located just south of Interstate 80 with exits at mile markers 97 and 101. DuBois is located on U.S. Route 219, which connects with Buffalo, New York, to the north and Johnstown, Pennsylvania, to the south. The city is located 3 miles (5 km) north of U.S. Route 322, which locally connects the city with Reynoldsville west bound and Clearfield east bound and to Atlantic City, New Jersey to the east and Cleveland, Ohio to the west. U.S. Route 119 begins as Blinker Parkway just south of the city. It connects the city with Punxsutawney and eventually leads to southwestern Pennsylvania and West Virginia. Pennsylvania Route 255 begins in the northern part of the city and follows East DuBois Avenue, then becoming the Bee-Line highway, connecting to the city of St. Marys, becoming the Million Dollar Highway.

=== Bus lines ===
Fullington Trailways operates a bus terminal via Fullington Auto Bus Company with a station located on Rockton Road just past the intersection of Maple Avenue and Shaffer Road. It is part of the Trailways Transportation System which interlines with other carriers that includes Greyhound. DuBois is a hub for Fullington Trailways; all of its routes to Harrisburg, State College, Scranton–Wilkes-Barre, Pittsburgh, and Buffalo run through DuBois.

=== Businesses ===
Local businesses are diverse; producing paper, lumber, food products, concrete, utility meters, machinery, and equipment, which are shipped to customers around the world via the area's extensive transportation infrastructure.

The DuBois Mall is a regional retail center serving the Tri-County area with national stores including Old Navy and JC Penney.

== Healthcare ==
Penn Highlands Healthcare is an extensive healthcare organization headquartered in DuBois, and DuBois' largest employer. It serves patients from twenty-six counties through affiliates including Penn Highlands Brookville, Penn Highlands Clearfield, Penn Highlands DuBois (formerly the DuBois Regional Medical Center), and Penn Highlands Elk.

== Media ==
=== Television ===
DuBois receives television programming from the Johnstown-Altoona-State College, PA media market.

=== Print ===
The DuBois Micropolitan area is served by The Courier-Express, a Monday-Friday evening daily newspaper with a circulation of approximately 10,000 homes and businesses. It covers the DuBois area of Clearfield County and most of Jefferson County, plus the southern half of Elk County in depth, reaching up into Johnsonburg and southern McKean and Forest counties. It was established in 1944 when the Daily Courier (founded as the Weekly Courier in 1879) and the Daily Express (founded as the Express in 1883) consolidated to become The Courier-Express.

Tri-County Sunday is printed on Sundays with a circulation of approximately 16,000. It covers the area of The Courier-Express, plus wide circulation in Cameron, southern McKean, Clarion and Forest counties.

== Education ==
=== Colleges and universities ===
Regional advanced education resources include Pennsylvania State University – DuBois Campus, and Triangle Tech all located in DuBois, with Lock Haven University – Clearfield Campus, South Hills School of Business and Technology – State College, and Penn West Clarion a short commute away.

=== Public schools ===
The DuBois Area School District is a large, rural public school district. The district spans portions of two counties and operates six public schools.

- DuBois Area Senior High School
- DuBois Area Middle School
- C.G. Johnson Elementary School
- Juniata Elementary School
- Luthersburg Elementary School (Closed)
- Oklahoma Elementary School
- Penfield Elementary School (Closed)
- Sykesville Elementary School (Closed)
- Wasson Avenue Elementary School

Alternatively, high school students may choose to attend Jefferson County Dubois Area Vocational-Technical School in Reynoldsville for training in the construction and mechanical trades, the culinary arts, information technology, and allied health careers. The Riverview Intermediate Unit IU6 provides the District with a wide variety of services like specialized education for disabled students and hearing, speech and visual disability services and professional development for staff and faculty.

=== Private schools ===
Private schools in DuBois include:

- Central Catholic High School which also contains a middle school and elementary school on campus.
- DuBois Christian School provides preschool through twelfth grade classes.

== Recreation areas ==
=== Treasure Lake ===
One of DuBois' recreational assets is Treasure Lake, a semi-private, gated residential community consisting of over 8,000 acres (3,200 ha). Community recreational amenities consist of two lakes for boating and fishing, three beaches, two PGA-rated 18-hole golf courses, clay & hard tennis courts, two swimming pools, horse stables, and a campground that offers cottage rentals and camping sites. Additionally, Treasure Lake has two pro shops, a marina, a country store, two concession stands, a town center, and a salon.

=== Golf ===
The DuBois Country Club is a century-old club with a public golf course with a 6,500-square-foot (600 m^{2}) clubhouse.

=== Cook Forest ===
Cook Forest is the most important tract of virgin timberland to be found in Pennsylvania and is a 35-mile drive from DuBois. Major Israel McCreight of DuBois was an early advocate, promoter, and steward of the 8,500-acre (3,400 ha) Cook Forest State Park, the first Pennsylvania State Park acquired to preserve a natural landmark. Cook Forest features 27 marked trails totaling 29 miles for hiking. The terrain is of rolling hills and cool valley streams. Scenic areas include the old growth forest, Fire Tower/Seneca Point and the Clarion River. Among Cook Forest's primary attractions is the "Forest Cathedral" area of old growth white pine and hemlock, some trees of which top 180 feet. About 5,000 acres are open to hunting, trapping, and the training of dogs during established seasons. Common game species are deer, wild turkey, bear, and squirrel. The Clarion River flows along the park border and provides fishing for trout, warm-water game fish and panfish. Visitors can canoe or kayak down the river.

== Theater and the arts ==
DuBois is building a strong reputation for local entertainment and the arts in the tri-county area.

More traditional arts can be found at the Winkler Gallery of Fine Arts, founded by local artist Perry Winkler. The Winkler Gallery of Fine Arts opened its doors in December 2003 as a co-op for local artists to display and sell their work to the public. The gallery hosts the annual DuBois Arts Festival. Along with supporting the local artist community, the gallery provides art education for the residents of the DuBois area through artist workshops in several mediums such as stained glass, silk painting, and watercolors.

Theater groups "Reitz Theater Players" and "Cultural Resources Inc." perform a selection of theater productions each year at the Paul G. Reitz Theater in downtown DuBois.

== Local historical interest ==
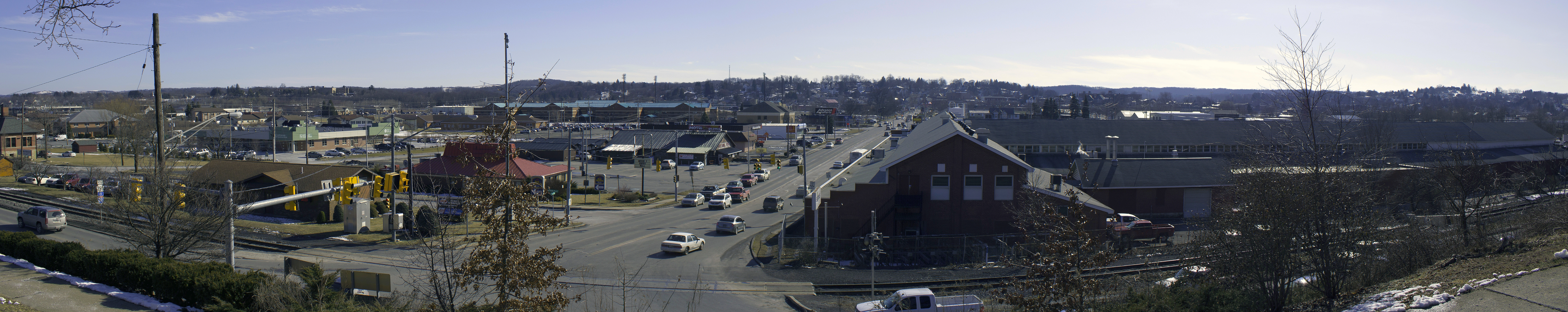
View of DuBois

=== Brewery ===
There seems to be some debate as to exactly when Frank Hahne came to DuBois and broke ground on his own facility. One source claims 1898, another 1897. It seems most likely that this occurred between April and the end of 1896. It was on April 16, 1896, that the DuBois Weekly Courier reported: "Some new developments in connection with the brewery may be looked for in the near future."

There were a number of reasons Hahne chose the DuBois site for his facility, but the most frequently cited was the excellence of the water supply. He purchased 2,300 acres (9.3 km^{2}) surrounding the local reservoir to protect the watershed from pollution.

By 1906, the brewery had four products on the market: DuBois Wurzburger, Hahne's Export Pilsener, DuBois Porter, and DuBois Budweiser. The Budweiser name would be at the center of controversy for 60 years between DuBois Brewing and Anheuser-Busch.

The DuBois brands soon traveled far and wide for a brewery of its size, ranging up to 150 miles (240 km) away and selling well in Buffalo, Erie and Pittsburgh. The brewery's 300-barrel kettle was kept busy churning out brands, while the left-over grain materials were pressed and sold for cattle feed and grist mills in the rural areas surrounding DuBois.

As with many other American breweries, DuBois Brewing moved right along until 1918 and the advent of Prohibition. The brewery shifted production to "near beer" and soft drinks and opened the H&G Ice Company. According to the April 7, 1933, DuBois Courier, the brewery won the honor of being one of only two breweries in the entire nation that had never violated or been suspected of violating the Prohibition laws since the 18th Amendment went into effect. As a result, DuBois Brewing Company was issued license number G-2, allowing them to resume brewing immediately upon the enaction of the 21st Amendment.

Frank Hahne died in 1932, and the brewery was passed to his only son, Frank Hahne Jr., whose own only son died in infancy, leaving the family without an heir. Hahne Jr. sold the brewery to Pittsburgh Brewing in 1967.

The brewery was torn down in late 2003.

== Notable people ==
- Thomas S. Flood, US congressman
- Frank Fuller, National Football League defensive tackle
- Andrew Gordon, stock car racing driver
- Benny Gordon, stock car racing driver
- Johnny J. Jones, carnival showman
- Deacon Litz, Indycar racing driver
- Sparky Lyle, Major League Baseball pitcher, 1977 Cy Young Award winner, two-time World Series champion
- Charles H. MacDonald, World War II fighter ace
- Ann McCrea, actress (The Donna Reed Show), born in DuBois in 1931
- Jan D. Miller, metallurgical engineer and member of the National Academy of Engineering
- Tom Mix, iconic early 20th century cowboy film actor, was raised in DuBois
- Jim Pittsley, Major League Baseball pitcher
- Paul E. Vallely, U.S. Army Major General; military analyst for Fox News Channel

=== Notable mentions ===
- Fey, Tina (January 29, 2013). Bossypants. NY, NY: A Reagan Arthur Book: Little, Brown and Company. p. 247. ISBN 978-0-316-05689-2. "If you're a die-hard 'foodie,' hop off the road in DuBois and enjoy a Subway sandwich made at a place that is eighty percent gas station."
