= Reynoldsville, Pennsylvania =

Borough in Pennsylvania, US

- Borough
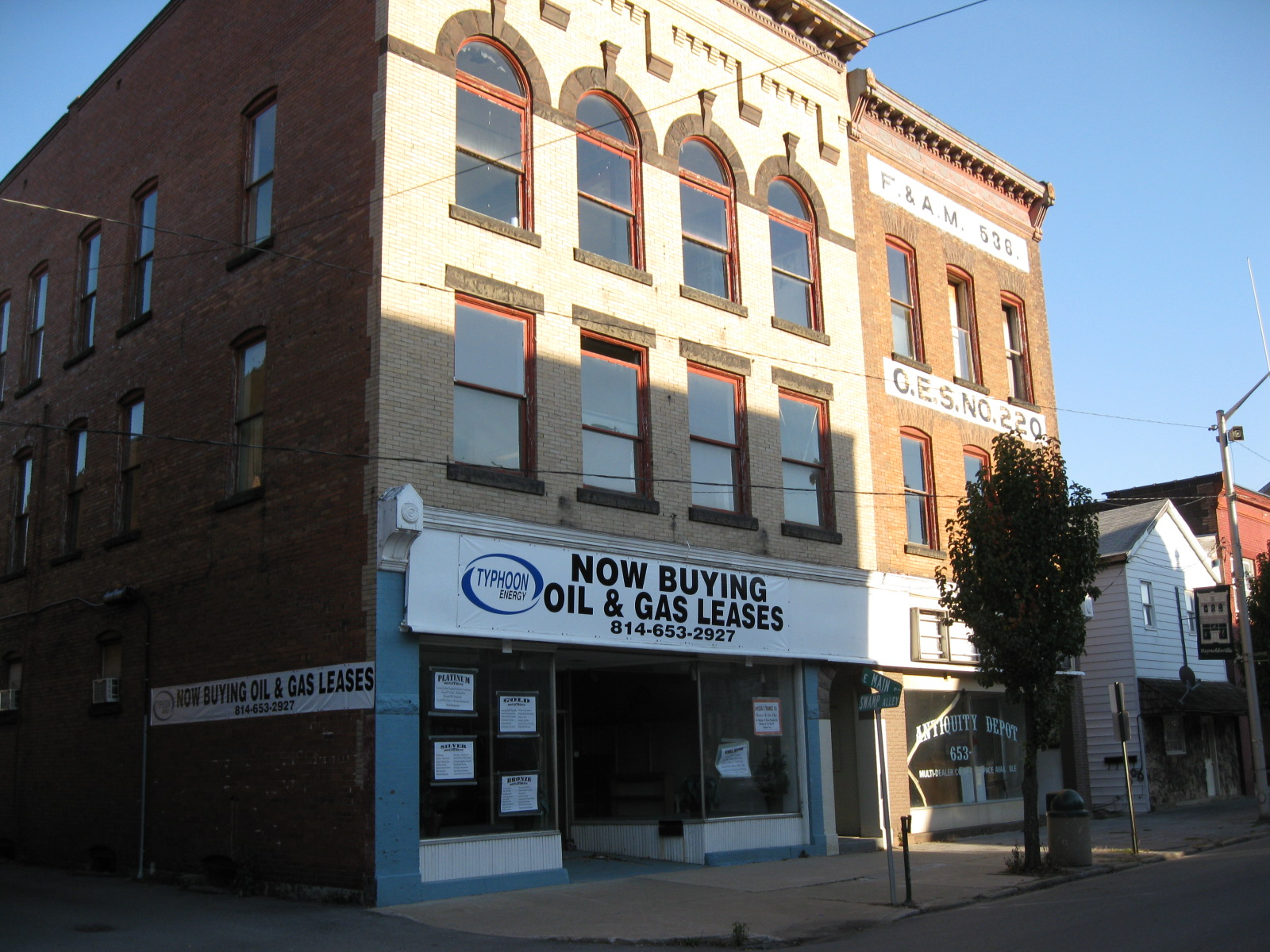

- Location of Reynoldsville in Jefferson County, Pennsylvania.

- Location within Pennsylvania Location within the United States
- Coordinates: 41°05′40″N 78°53′15″W
- Country: United States
- State: Pennsylvania
- County: Jefferson
- Settled: 1838
- Incorporated: 1873

Government
  - Type: Borough Council
  - Mayor: Louie "Peach" Caltagarone
  - Police Chief: Troy Bell
  - Fire Chief: Darren Scolese

Area
  - Total: 1.42 sq mi (3.67 km^{2})
  - Land: 1.39 sq mi (3.59 km^{2})
  - Water: 0.027 sq mi (0.07 km^{2})
- Elevation: 1,391 ft (424 m)

Population (2020)
  - Total: 2,549
  - Density: 1,836.9/sq mi (709.25/km^{2})
- Time zone: UTC-5 (Eastern (EST))
  - Summer (DST): UTC-4 (EDT)
- ZIP code: 15851
- Area code: 814
- FIPS code: 42-64376
- Website: https://reynoldsvilleborough.gov/

Reynoldsville is a borough in Jefferson County, Pennsylvania, United States. It is 73 miles (117 km) northeast of Pittsburgh in a productive soft coal region. As of the 2020 census, Reynoldsville had a population of 2,549.

Reynoldsville was originally called Winslow Township and was renamed after local postmaster Thomas Reynolds in 1850.

== History ==
In 1855, a man by the name of Tilton Reynolds owned the land in what is today Reynoldsville. He began selling lots of property in the hopes of starting a town. Over the course of the 19th century, Reynoldsville would grow into the town that is it is today. Reynoldsville would grow its industries in the way of silk mills, brick and tile works, a tannery, a macaroni factory, and an asbestos plant to provide employment. The borough was greatly enlarged in 1913 when it annexed West Reynoldsville (population 993 in 1910) and three large adjacent areas.

The Herpel Brothers Foundry and Machine Shop was added to the National Register of Historic Places in 2004.

== Geography ==
Reynoldsville is located in eastern Jefferson County at 41°5′40″N 78°53′15″W (41.094465, -78.887604), in the valley of Sandy Lick Creek where it is joined by Soldier Run. U.S. Route 322 (Main Street) passes through the borough, leading northwest 12 miles (19 km) to Brookville, the county seat, and southeast 10 miles (16 km) to Luthersburg. Pennsylvania Route 950 runs northeast from Reynoldsville up the Sandy Lick Creek valley 6 miles (10 km) to Falls Creek, and Pennsylvania Route 310 leads south 12 miles (19 km) to Punxsutawney.

According to the United States Census Bureau, Reynoldsville has a total area of 1.49 square miles (3.87 km^{2}), of which 0.03 square miles (0.07 km^{2}), or 1.87%, are water. The borough, via Sandy Lick Creek, is part of the Redbank Creek watershed, flowing west to the Allegheny River and ultimately the Ohio River.

== Demographics ==
Historical population
Census	Pop.	Note	%±
1880	1,410		—
1890	2,789		97.8%
1900	3,435		23.2%
1910	3,189		−7.2%
1920	4,116		29.1%
1930	3,480		−15.5%
1940	3,675		5.6%
1950	3,569		−2.9%
1960	3,158		−11.5%
1970	2,771		−12.3%
1980	3,016		8.8%
1990	2,818		−6.6%
2000	2,710		−3.8%
2010	2,759		1.8%
2020	2,549		−7.6%

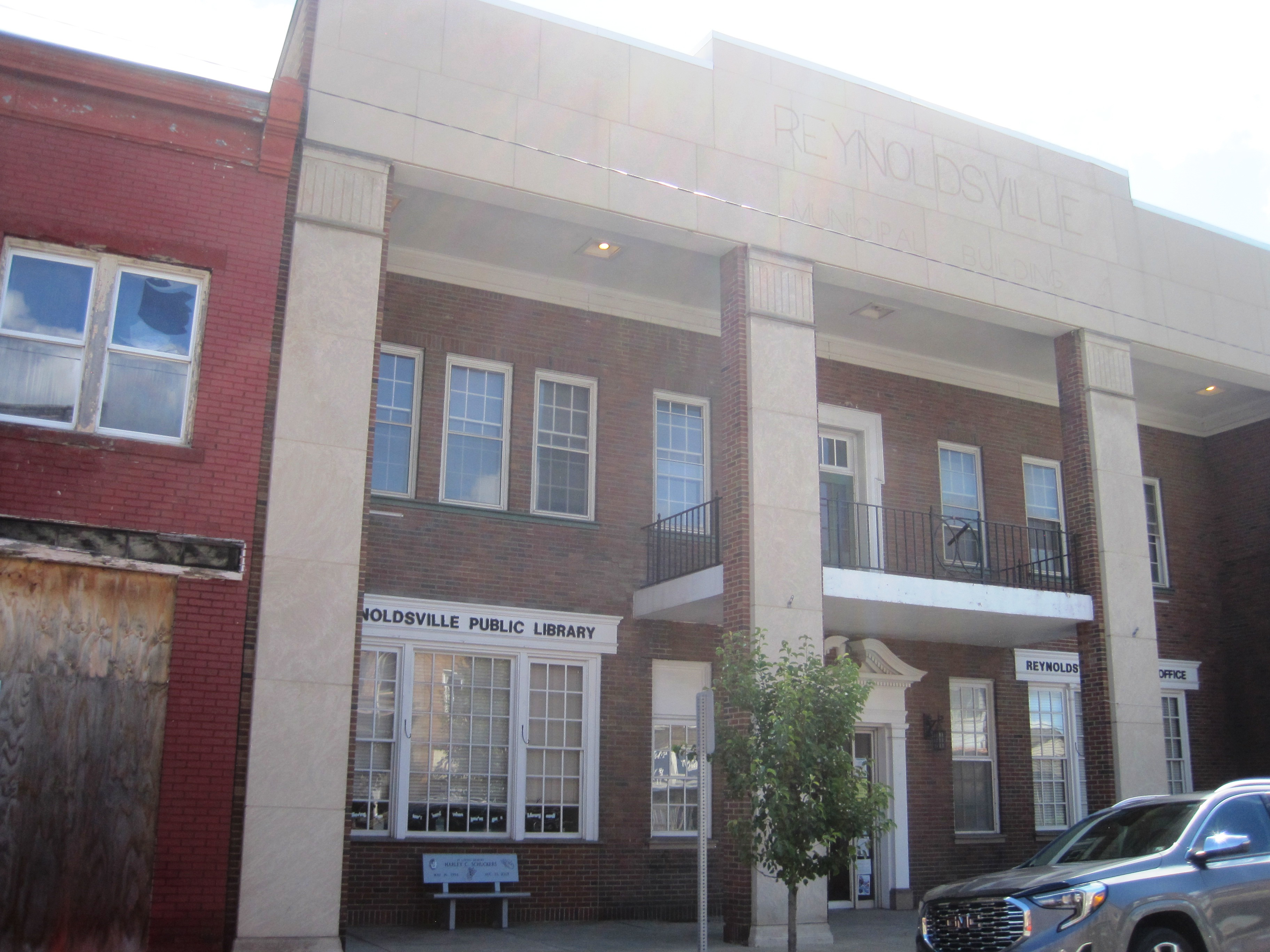
Reynoldsville Borough Office and library

As of the census of 2000, there were 2,710 people, 1,117 households, and 741 families residing in the borough. The population density was 1,874.2 inhabitants per square mile (723.6/km^{2}). There were 1,233 housing units at an average density of 852.7 units per square mile (329.2 units/km^{2}). The racial makeup of the borough was 98.86% White, 0.15% African American, 0.37% Native American, 0.11% Asian, and 0.52% from two or more races. Hispanic or Latino of any race were 0.55% of the population.

There were 1,117 households, out of which 32.0% had children under the age of 18 living with them, 47.0% were married couples living together, 14.8% had a female householder with no husband present, and 33.6% were non-families. 31.3% of all households were made up of individuals, and 17.0% had someone living alone who was 65 years of age or older. The average household size was 2.38 and the average family size was 2.96.

In the borough the population was spread out, with 27.0% under the age of 18, 8.2% from 18 to 24, 26.3% from 25 to 44, 22.0% from 45 to 64, and 16.4% who were 65 years of age or older. The median age was 36 years. For every 100 females there were 92.3 males. For every 100 females age 18 and over, there were 87.4 males.

The median income for a household in the borough was $25,000, and the median income for a family was $34,783. Males had a median income of $31,977 versus $16,705 for females. The per capita income for the borough was $13,592. About 20.4% of families and 25.6% of the population were below the poverty line, including 38.6% of those under age 18 and 11.3% of those age 65 or over.

== Schools ==
Jefferson County - DuBois AVTS (also known as Jeff Tech) is located in Reynoldsville, PA. It is a comprehensive career and technology school that serves students in 9th - 12th grade from the Brockway, Brookville, DuBois and Punxsutawney School Districts. The school offers training to students in 14 different career areas. For Elementary education serves C.G. Johnson Elementary School which is a part of the DuBois Area School District.

== Notable person ==
- William Binney, intelligence community whistleblower
- Sparky Lyle, Major League pitcher, 1967-1982
