= WQQP =

Radio station in Sykesville, Pennsylvania

Simulcasts WCCR-FM Clarion and WPQP Clearfield
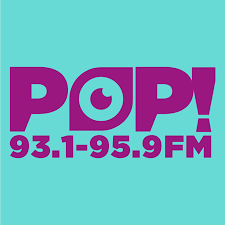
- Sykesville, Pennsylvania; United States
- Broadcast area: DuBois, Pennsylvania
- Frequency: 95.9 MHz
- Branding: "Pop 92.7-93.1-95.9"

Programming
- Format: Top 40
- Affiliations: Compass Media Networks; Premiere Networks

Ownership
- Owner: Seven Mountains Media; (Southern Belle, LLC)
- Sister stations: WLUI, WMRF-FM, WIFT, WKFT, WPQP

History
- First air date: May 5, 2009 (as WZDB)
- Former call signs: WZDB (2007–2018)

Technical information
- Licensing authority: FCC
- Facility ID: 170958
- Class: A
- ERP: 1,500 watts
- HAAT: 196 meters (643 ft)
- Transmitter coordinates: 41.046°N 78.703°W

Links
- Public license information: Public file; LMS
- Webcast: Listen Live
- Website: popradiopa.com

WQQP (95.9 FM, "Pop 92.7-93.1-95.9") is a commercial radio station licensed to Sykesville, Pennsylvania, United States, and serving parts of DuBois. Owned by Seven Mountains Media, it broadcasts a Top 40 format simulcast with sister stations WCCR-FM (92.7) in Clarion and WPQP (93.1 FM) in Clearfield.

== History ==
The roots of WQQP can be traced back to the early 1980s, when the 95.9 MHz channel was first assigned to Brookville, Pennsylvania; operating then as WMKX, a mostly automated station that played adult contemporary music. In the mid-1990s, Renda Broadcasting Corporation, which owned competitors WECZ and WPXZ in Punxsutawney, applied to put a new 25,000 watt station on the air in Brookville at 103.3 MHz. For that station, WKQL, to go on the air, several FM channel shuffles would have to take place.

This affected the operation of WMKX, which under the plan, would move to 105.5 MHz from 95.9. Not long after the changes took place in 2000, the Federal Communications Commission (FCC) opened a window for a series of low-power FM license applications by non-profit groups or organizations. A local church applied for the 95.9 frequency while it was still fairly fresh in local listeners' minds, and began to broadcast a contemporary Christian music format under the call letters WWJL-LP and the moniker "Where Jesus Lives".

WWJL-LP continued to operate until May 31, 2007, after it was learned that an FCC license renewal application had not been completed correctly. First Media, which owned stations WOWQ, WCED, and WQYX, immediately filed an application to move the channel from Brookville to Sykesville and increase its power back to its original Class A status it had originally during the early years of WMKX. The station as it is today, WQQP, signed on the air May 5, 2009 as WZDB. To help extend its signal in the west, First Media put a second FM station, WZDD (101.3 FM), on the air in Strattanville to be used as a simulcast outlet of WZDB.

In October 2016, First Media reached a deal to sell WZDB, WCPA, WOWQ, WQYX, and WZDD to Seven Mountains Media for $4.5 million. The company had also previously bought First Media's State College stations.

On May 30, 2017, WZDB rebranded as "Clear Rock 95.9", while former simulcast partner WZDD began to simulcast WOWQ's country music format. On March 19, 2018, the station switched to becoming a simulcast of WPQP Pop 93.1 (the former WQYX). The station changed its call sign to WQQP on March 23, 2018.
