= National Register of Historic Places listings in Clarion County, Pennsylvania =

Location of Clarion County in Pennsylvania

This is a list of the National Register of Historic Places listings in Clarion County, Pennsylvania.

This is intended to be a complete list of the properties and districts on the National Register of Historic Places in Clarion County, Pennsylvania, United States. The locations of National Register properties and districts for which the latitude and longitude coordinates are included below, may be seen in a map.

There are six properties and districts listed on the National Register in the county.

This National Park Service list is complete through NPS recent listings posted March 14, 2025.

== Current listings ==
	Name on the Register	Image	Date listed	Location	City or town	Description
1	Buchanan Furnace	Buchanan Furnace	September 6, 1991 (#91001129)	Off Pennsylvania Route 378 at the Clarion River; 41°07′54″N 79°33′32″W	Licking Township	
2	Clarion County Courthouse and Jail	Clarion County Courthouse and Jail	May 22, 1979 (#79002208)	Main Street; 41°12′55″N 79°23′09″W	Clarion	
3	Cook Forest State Park Indian Cabin District	Cook Forest State Park Indian Cabin District	February 12, 1987 (#87000019)	Off Pennsylvania Route 36 at Cooksburg; 41°20′02″N 79°12′32″W	Farmington Township	Extends into Forest County
4	Foxburg Country Club and Golf Course	Foxburg Country Club and Golf Course	February 21, 2007 (#07000076)	369 Harvey Road; 41°09′00″N 79°40′45″W	Foxburg	
5	Memorial Church of Our Father		March 31, 2022 (#100007547)	110 Church St. 41°08′44″N 79°40′49″W	Foxburg	
6	Sutton-Ditz House	Sutton-Ditz House	February 20, 2004 (#04000063)	18 Grant Street; 41°12′50″N 79°23′12″W	Clarion	

== See also ==
- List of National Historic Landmarks in Pennsylvania
- National Register of Historic Places listings in Pennsylvania
- List of Pennsylvania state historical markers in Clarion County
