= WMKX =

Radio station in Brookville, Pennsylvania

WMKX and WJNG

WMKX: Brookville, Pennsylvania; WJNG: Johnsonburg, Pennsylvania; United States
- Broadcast area: DuBois, Pennsylvania
- Frequencies: WMKX: 105.5 MHz; WJNG: 100.5 MHz
- Branding: Mega Rock

Programming
- Format: Modern/classic rock

Ownership
- Owner: Seven Mountains Media; (Southern Belle, LLC)

History
- First air date: WMKX: April 27, 1981; WJNG: March 3, 1997
- Former frequencies: WMKX: 95.9 MHz (1981–1995)
- Call sign meaning: WJNG: Johnsonburg

Technical information
- Licensing authority: FCC
- Facility ID: WMKX: 83524; WJNG: 15173
- Class: WMKX: B1; WJNG: A
- ERP: WMKX: 16,000 watts; WJNG: 1,300 watts
- HAAT: WMKX: 126 meters (413 ft); WJNG: 203 meters (666 ft)
- Transmitter coordinates: WMKX: 41°7′21.2″N 79°3′50.1″W; WJNG: 41°23′11.2″N 78°41′31.1″W

Links
- Public license information: WMKX: Public file; LMS; WJNG: Public file; LMS
- Webcast: Listen live
- Website: megarock.fm

WMKX (105.5 FM) is a modern/classic rock music-formatted radio station licensed to Brookville, Pennsylvania, United States, serving northwestern Pennsylvania. The station is owned by Seven Mountains Media.

WJNG, licensed to Johnsonburg, Pennsylvania, is a full co-owned simulcast outlet of WMKX.

== History ==
First issued a construction permit on June 6, 1980; WMKX first went on the air at the frequency of 95.9 in 1981, and became the second FM station in Jefferson County, as WPXZ, 15 miles southeast in Punxsutawney had been the first eight years before.

WMKX was founded by Stephen S. Strattan and Joseph Donald Powers, adopting the moniker "Magic 96". It went on the air with a mostly automated format of adult contemporary music, which it would maintain until the late 1990s. Studios and offices were first located at 205 Main Street in downtown Brookville.

In 1984, Jim Farley took over company president duties from Stephen Strattan.

In the mid-1990s, another frequency of 103.3 was assigned to Brookville through the efforts of WPXZ licensee Renda Broadcasting, which had been looking to gain a foothold in the county seat. In order for the new station to go on the air, a series of channel shuffling would have to take place to accommodate the new frequency. The shuffling would enable WMKX to take WPXZ's frequency of 105.5 as its own, and with the move of that frequency northwest, it also enabled WMKX to petition the FCC for an effective radiated power increase from 3,000 to 25,000 watts (something that wasn't possible at 95.9 due to the presence of an FM station on 95.9 in Sharpsville, Pennsylvania, now WAKZ), thus taking the station from a local to more regional listenership base, allowing it to also serve the communities of Clarion and DuBois. With the right conditions, WMKX can be heard as far west as Butler, Pennsylvania.

At around this same time, Strattan Broadcasting also applied for an FCC 'drop-in' frequency at 100.5 north of Brookville in Johnsonburg, Elk County. The 3,000 watt license was granted to Strattan Broadcasting, and after its construction, the station underwent a format change from adult contemporary to its current format. The station is live for the morning show until 1PM then it utilizes Dial Global's Classic Rock feed.

== WMKX Today ==
In 1997, the new station, known as "Mega Rock" was born. The Johnsonburg station, WJNG, allowed WMKX's signal to expand into the northcentral portion of Pennsylvania, serving listeners in St. Marys, Ridgway, Smethport, and Kane. Though WJNG is a simulcast station, it maintains separate offices at 517½ Market Street in Johnsonburg.

As for what happened to WMKX's original frequency of 95.9, it was recovered by a local church and converted to an LPFM license, and had operated with a local Christian format staffed primarily by volunteers, for about five years. The church later closed the station, known as WWJL-LP, with a dark license in 2007. In May 2009, 95.9 was allocated to Sykesville, Pennsylvania and WZDB went on the air. It is now simulcasting WPQP.

Administrative and programming functions continue to originate out of WMKX's longtime location at 51 Pickering Street in downtown Brookville.

=== Sale to Seven Mountains Media ===
On June 13, 2023, Strattan Broadcasting sold WMKX and WJNG to Seven Mountains Media for $540,000. The sale was consummated on September 1, 2023.
