= WCCR-FM =

Radio station in Clarion, Pennsylvania

Coordinates: 41.2448°N 79.2614°W

Simulcast with WPQP Clearfield and WQQP Sykesville
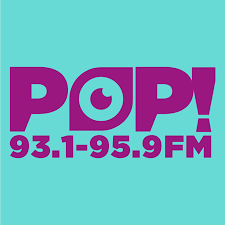
- Clarion, Pennsylvania; United States
- Frequency: 92.7 MHz
- Branding: Pop Radio 92.7/93.1/95.9

Programming
- Format: Top 40

Ownership
- Owner: Seven Mountains Media; (Southern Belle, LLC)
- Sister stations: WWCH

History
- First air date: 1985
- Former call signs: WMQP (1984, CP); WCCR (1984–2015)

Technical information
- Licensing authority: FCC
- Facility ID: 11661
- Class: A
- ERP: 3,000 watts
- HAAT: 85 meters (279 ft)

Links
- Public license information: Public file; LMS
- Webcast: Listen Live
- Website: popradiopa.com

WCCR-FM (92.7 MHz) is a commercial radio station in Clarion, Pennsylvania, United States. WCCR-FM operates with an effective radiated power of 3,000 watts. This station, along with its co-located AM sister WWCH, is owned by Seven Mountains Media, through licensee Southern Belle, LLC.

== History ==
Founded by Clarion County Broadcasting, WCCR-FM launched in 1985 under the moniker C-93, with a Top 40/CHR format. It was, and still is, sister to WWCH.

The construction permit to build the station was issued on February 14, 1983, with the call sign WMQP first assigned on September 4, 1984. The station never used that call sign, taking its current call sign less than a month later.

Throughout the years, the station's formats fluctuated between Top 40 and classic rock, eventually settling on hot adult contemporary.

WCCR-FM is the voice of Clarion University Golden Eagles Sports.

On November 7, 2022, Seven Mountains Media announced their purchase of WCCR-FM, sister station WWCH, and translator W231DR from Clarion County Broadcasting. Seven Mountains Media also owns WKFT (101.3 FM) in Strattanville, serving as a Clarion-area simulcast of WIFT (102.1 FM) in DuBois. The purchase was consummated on March 1, 2023.

On June 29, 2023, WCCR-FM changed its format from hot adult contemporary to top 40 (CHR), branded as "Pop Radio 92.7/93.1/95.9"; the station simulcasts with WPQP (93.1 FM) in Clearfield and WQQP (95.9 FM) in Sykesville.
