= WWCH =

Radio station in Clarion, Pennsylvania

Coordinates: 41°11′57″N 79°21′25″W

- Clarion, Pennsylvania; United States
- Frequency: 1300 kHz
- Branding: Bigfoot Legends 101.3 & 94.1

Programming
- Format: Classic country

Ownership
- Owner: Seven Mountains Media; (Southern Belle, LLC)
- Sister stations: WCCR-FM; WKFT; WIFT

History
- First air date: June 12, 1960

Technical information
- Licensing authority: FCC
- Facility ID: 11662
- Class: D
- ERP: 850 watts day; 28 watts night
- Translator: 94.1 W231DR (Clarion)
- Repeater: 101.3 WKFT (Strattanville)

Links
- Public license information: Public file; LMS
- Webcast: Listen live
- Website: bigfootlegendsradio.com

WWCH (1300 AM) is a radio station in Clarion, Pennsylvania, United States. Owned by Seven Mountains Media, WWCH has a classic country format, simulcast with WKFT (101.3 FM) in Strattanville.

== History ==
WWCH is the sole AM radio station in Clarion County, first going on the air as a daytime-only station with a maximum power output of 500 watts on June 12, 1960, from studios above the Garby movie theater on Main Street in Clarion.

The station was founded by William Curtis Hearst, his wife Harriet, and partners William Sheridan and Henry Troese. Hearst had a previous history of newspaper management and ownership for almost two decades prior to signing on WWCH, owning the Clarion Democrat and the Clarion Republican (both forerunners to the Clarion News). Both publications were sold to an Oil City-based publisher in 1965.

William Sheridan was company president at the time of startup. Hearst's son, William C. "Bill" Hearst, joined the station in 1978 after graduating from Mansfield State College, taking control of the stations later that year. It was under his direction that the station saw its largest growth. The station moved from the Garby Theater to a converted house on Wood Street in Clarion, where WWCH was joined by an FM sister station, also licensed to Clarion, in 1985. That station is known as WCCR-FM.

In the early 1990s, WWCH was awarded nighttime power authorization.

The stations moved to their current location at 1168 Greenville Pike in Clarion Township in 1994, where they adjoin their transmitter facilities. In 2015, WWCH launched an FM translator (W231DR), rebranding as "94.1 The Goat", with little change to its program offerings.

On November 7, 2022, Seven Mountains Media announced their purchase of WWCH, sister station WCCR-FM, and translator W231DR from Clarion County Broadcasting. Seven Mountains Media also owns WKFT (101.3 FM) in Strattanville, at the time a Clarion-area simulcast of WIFT (102.1 FM) in DuBois. The purchase was consummated on March 1, 2023. On September 25, 2023, Seven Mountains Media relaunched WWCH, which had previously branded as "The Goat", as "Bigfoot Legends"; the station also began simulcasting on WKFT.
