= WIFT =

- DuBois, Pennsylvania; United States
- Broadcast area: DuBois, Pennsylvania; Punxsutawney, Pennsylvania; Clearfield, Pennsylvania
- Frequency: 102.1 MHz
- Branding: Bigfoot Country 102.1

Programming
- Format: Country
- Affiliations: Compass Media Networks; Westwood One; WJAC-TV; Pittsburgh Steelers Radio Network

Ownership
- Owner: Kristin Cantrell; (Southern Belle, LLC)
- Sister stations: WCCR-FM, WKFT, WLUI, WMRF-FM, WQQP, WWCH

History
- First air date: 1948
- Former call signs: WCED-FM (1948–1981); WOWQ (1981–2000); WMOU-FM (2000–2002); WOWQ (2002–2017)
- Call sign meaning: "Bigfoot"

Technical information
- Licensing authority: FCC
- Facility ID: 67696
- Class: B
- ERP: 28,000 watts
- HAAT: 202 meters
- Transmitter coordinates: 41°2′43.0″N 78°42′11.0″W

Links
- Public license information: Public file; LMS
- Webcast: Listen Live
- Website: lovemybigfoot.com

WIFT (102.1 FM, "Bigfoot Country 102.1") is a country music formatted broadcast radio station licensed to DuBois, Pennsylvania, serving the DuBois/Punxsutawney/Clearfield area. WIFT is owned and operated by Kristin Cantrell, through licensee Southern Belle, LLC.

== History ==
=== Early years ===
For many years, the station had been the sister station of WCED, also licensed to DuBois. The station made its debut seven years after WCED first signed on. Like many FM stations that were part of an AM portfolio, this station made its debut as WCED-FM, simulcasting its AM sister for portions of the broadcast day, separating for a period during the day as part of a 1965 FCC mandate requiring combination AM/FM licensees to originate separate programming for at least half of the broadcast day.

In 1981, the separate-programming rule was repealed by the FCC, but WCED-FM went the opposing direction and adopted the call letters WOWQ and the moniker Q102, becoming a fully independent station with its own programming. It began this identity initially with a Top 40 format, mostly automated. By 1988, the station had switched its format from Top 40 to country, and began putting live local DJs on during the daytime hours, with a satellite-delivered country music format programmed offsite from another location during the evening hours. Though the format had changed, the Q102 moniker was retained. It was at this time that the station had begun pretty much what it is today.

WOWQ and WCED were also two of the very first stations in the U.S. to use hard-disk audio storage technology in the early 1990s, developed by Computer Concepts Corporation.

=== Sale to Vox Media ===
Tri-County Broadcasting, a subsidiary of Oil City, Pennsylvania-based Derrick Publishing (which publishes the Oil City Derrick and the Clarion News daily newspapers), had owned WCED and WOWQ since its inception in 1948. Company president E. Michael Boyle decided to sell both stations to Vox Media in 1999.

Upon acquisition, Vox Media changed WOWQ's call letters to WMOU-FM in December 2000 and adopted the moniker "Moo 102", though it maintained the popular country music format. The move was made to presumably create the same top-of-mind-recall generated by its competitors in Altoona, whose stations were branded as "Froggy". Vox Media then decided to put both WOWQ and WCED up for sale, with WOWQ being sold in October 2001 to First Media Radio, LLC, for $4.2 million. WCED would be spun off to another owner five years later.

=== Q102 returns ===
Shortly after the acquisition by First Media, the station reverted to the Q102 moniker and moved out of its longtime home at 80 North Park Place on the outskirts of DuBois. The station then moved to a new building shared with the DuBois news office of Johnstown NBC affiliate WJAC-TV, where it remains today. Effective January 3, 2017, First Media sold WIFT, WCPA, WQYX, WZDB, and WZDD to Southern Belle, LLC for $4.5 million.

=== Bigfoot Country ===
On May 30, 2017, WOWQ rebranded as "Bigfoot Country 102.1 & 101.3", in part reflecting a new simulcast with WKFT (101.3 FM) in Strattanville; the call sign was changed to WIFT. WKFT broke from the simulcast with WIFT in September 2023 to begin simulcasting a classic country format, "Bigfoot Legends", with WWCH.
