= WCPA (AM) =

Radio station in Clearfield, Pennsylvania

Coordinates: 41°02′32″N 78°26′54″W

- Clearfield, Pennsylvania; United States
- Broadcast area: DuBois
- Frequency: 900 kHz
- Branding: Passport Radio

Programming
- Language: English
- Format: Classic hits

Ownership
- Owner: Seven Mountains Media; (Southern Belle, LLC)

History
- First air date: 1947
- Call sign meaning: Clearfield, Pennsylvania

Technical information
- Licensing authority: FCC
- Facility ID: 11982
- Class: B
- Power: 2,500 watts (day); 500 watts (night)
- Translators: 98.5 W253CU (Clearfield); 101.7 W269EC (DuBois)

Links
- Public license information: Public file; LMS
- Webcast: Listen live
- Website: passportradiopa.com

WCPA (900 kHz, "Passport Radio") is a commercial AM radio station licensed to Clearfield, Pennsylvania, United States, and serving DuBois. WCPA is owned by Seven Mountains Media, through licensee Southern Belle, LLC. WCPA broadcasts with a power output of 2,500 watts (day); and 500 watts (night).

== History ==
WCPA was the first of three radio properties once owned by Progressive Publishing, first going on the air back in 1947. Though it had always broadcast at its current frequency, this station would not be granted nighttime power authorization until 1990, when it undertook a major engineering project.

Prior to this, WCPA enjoyed a reputation as an immediate and reliable source for breaking local news, largely through the newspaper cross-ownership. This alliance resulted in many awards for the quality of their local newscasts. Wishing to expand their reach into other markets, Progressive also purchased WDAD in Indiana, Pennsylvania, in 1958, and WMAJ in State College at around the same time. Both WDAD and WMAJ experienced massive growth while under Progressive's ownership.

In the mid-1960s, the FCC approved a round of low-powered Class A FM drop-in channels to spur growth on that band among AM broadcasters who were reluctant to take the financial risk involved with the unpopular technology. Progressive successfully applied for three FM channels in their respective markets, with WCPA's FM sister, WQYX coming on the air at 93.5 (now at 93.1) on July 12, 1967.

=== 1980s: Progressive divestiture ===
In the late 1980s, Progressive decided to reduce its footprint and sold their properties in State College and Indiana, both in Pennsylvania. Sales of both stations generated close to $5 million by the end of the decade. With this new capital, Progressive decided to put a sizable investment into WCPA's future. Prior to 1990, it had been a single-tower non-directional daytime-only AM station operating at a thousand watts.

Progressive successfully applied for a construction permit to build a new transmitter and tower site. Two new towers were built for a directional-antenna pattern that would allow the station to operate at more than double its current power during the day, with nighttime power at 500 watts. The low dial position allowed WCPA to be heard clearly at night throughout Clearfield County, and parts of Centre County.

=== WCPA today ===
Until 2010, WCPA, along with WQYX, operated at 110 Healy Street in downtown Clearfield. In October 2006, Progressive Publishing sold WCPA and WQYX to First Media, owners of WOWQ in DuBois, for $750,000. On May 1, 2010, WCPA/WQYX held a "yard sale" to liquidate its 30-year collection of 45s and albums, as well as electronics, office supplies, etc., in preparation for the demolition of the building. The offices/studios were then co-located with WOWQ and WZDB in DuBois. Effective January 3, 2017, First Media sold WCPA, WOWQ, WQYX, WZDB, and WZDD to Seven Mountains Media for $4.5 million.

Logo before 101.7 translator sign on

On August 15, 2018, WCPA rebranded as "Passport Radio". The change occurred at the same time as WCPA launched their new FM translator at 98.5 FM, W253CU. There is a translator also at 101.7, W269EC. By this point, the station was airing a broad 1960s to 1980s classic hits format.
