= WPQP =

Radio station in Clearfield, Pennsylvania

Coordinates: 41.068°N 78.518°W

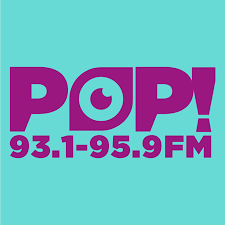
- Clearfield, Pennsylvania; United States
- Broadcast area: DuBois
- Frequency: 93.1 MHz
- Branding: Pop 92.7-93.1-95.9

Programming
- Format: Top 40
- Affiliations: Compass Media Networks; Premiere Networks

Ownership
- Owner: Seven Mountains Media; (Southern Belle, LLC)
- Sister stations: WLUI, WMRF-FM, WIFT, WKFT, WQQP

History
- First air date: 1981 (as WQYX)
- Former call signs: WQYX (1981–2017)
- Call sign meaning: Resembles "pop" (station branding)

Technical information
- Licensing authority: FCC
- Facility ID: 11981
- Class: B1
- ERP: 1,700 watts
- HAAT: 287 meters (942 ft)
- Repeaters: 92.7 WCCR-FM (Clarion); 95.9 WQQP (Sykesville)

Links
- Public license information: Public file; LMS
- Webcast: Listen Live
- Website: popradiopa.com

WPQP (93.1 FM, "Pop 92.7-93.1-95.9") is a commercial radio station licensed to Clearfield, Pennsylvania, United States, and serving DuBois. Owned by Seven Mountains Media, it broadcasts a Top 40 format. The station is also simulcast with WCCR-FM (92.7) in Clarion and WQQP (95.9 FM) in Sykesville.

== History ==
Throughout the 1980s, WQYX was an affiliate of Rick Dees Weekly Top 40 and Retro Pop Reunion.

In October 2016, First Media reached a deal to sell its remaining stations in West Central Pennsylvania to Seven Mountains Media for $4.5 million. At this point, WQYX was broadcasting a hot adult contemporary format branded as 93.1 WQYX. In August 2017, the station changed its call letters to WPQP, and announced that it would flip to contemporary hit radio as Pop 93.1 on 29 August.

On March 19, 2018, sister station WZDB switched from rock to a simulcast of WPQP, changing its call sign to WQQP on March 23, 2018. On June 29, 2023, sister station WCCR-FM became an additional simulcast, expanding WPQP/WQQP's reach to Clarion County.
