= List of Pennsylvania state historical markers in Clarion County =

Location of Clarion County in Pennsylvania

This is a list of the Pennsylvania state historical markers in Clarion County.

This is intended to be a complete list of the official state historical markers placed in Clarion County, Pennsylvania by the Pennsylvania Historical and Museum Commission (PHMC). The locations of the historical markers, as well as the latitude and longitude coordinates as provided by the PHMC's database, are included below when available. There are 7 historical markers located in Clarion County.

== Historical markers ==
Marker title	Image	Date dedicated	Location	Marker type	Topics
Brady's Bend		November 28, 1946	PA 68 at Brady's Bend Park Lookout, Brady's Bend; 40.98807°N 79.58303°W	Roadside	American Revolution, Military, Native American
Buchanan Furnace		April 3, 1950	PA 58, north of PA 368, Callensburg; 41.12722°N 79.5504°W	Roadside	Business & Industry, Coal, Furnaces, Iron
Clarion County		April 26, 1982	Courthouse, Main Street (US 322) at 5th Avenue, Clarion; 41.21508°N 79.38612°W	City	Business & Industry, Coal, Government & Politics, Government & Politics 19th Century, Iron
Fishbasket Old Town		July 12, 1997	At cemetery, Brookville Street (PA 28) near Park Road, Fairmount City; 41.012637°N 79.29455°W	Roadside	Cities & Towns, Early Settlement, Native American, Paths & Trails
Foxburg Golf Course		June 1, 1955	At golf course, St Petersburg Road (PA 58), Foxburg; 41.14648°N 79.67977°W	Roadside	Sports
Helen Furnace		March 31, 1950	Miola Road & White Oak Drive, 7 miles northeast of Clarion; 41.28748°N 79.31855°W	Roadside	Business & Industry, Coal, Furnaces, Iron
Rural Electrification		July 11, 1987	PA 368 near Terwilliger Road, 1 mile east of Parker; 41.10102°N 79.66488°W	Roadside	Business & Industry, Electricity

== See also ==
- List of Pennsylvania state historical markers
- National Register of Historic Places listings in Clarion County, Pennsylvania
