= Sykesville =

Sykesville may refer to a location in the United States:

- Sykesville, Maryland, in Carroll County
- Sykesville, New Jersey, in Burlington County
- Sykesville, Pennsylvania, in Jefferson County
