= Sutton-Ditz House =

Historic house in Pennsylvania, United States

- U.S. National Register of Historic Places
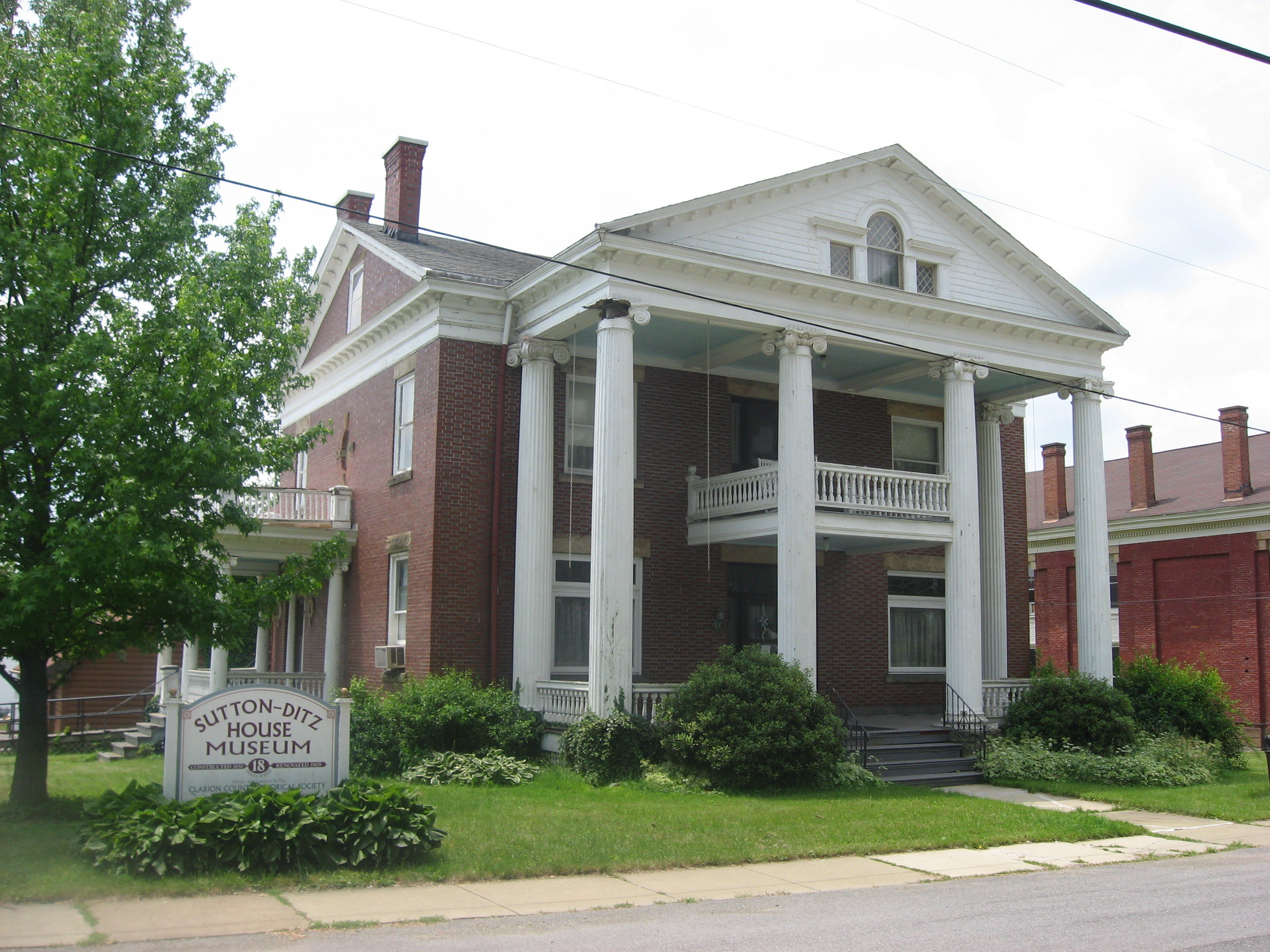
- Front and eastern side

- Location within Pennsylvania Location within the United States
- Location: 18 Grant St., Clarion, Pennsylvania
- Coordinates: 41°12′51″N 79°23′11″W
- Area: Less than 1 acre (0.40 ha)
- Built: 1847, 1909-1910
- Architect: Joseph Eckel
- Architectural style: Greek Revival, Classical Revival
- NRHP reference No.: 04000063
- Added to NRHP: February 20, 2004

Sutton-Ditz House is a historic home and museum located in Clarion, Clarion County, Pennsylvania. It was built in 1847, and remodeled in 1909–1910.

It was added to the National Register of Historic Places in 2004.

== Architecture ==
The house is a 2 1/2-story, brick Classical Revival style building on a sandstone foundation. It was originally built in the Greek Revival style. The front facade features a full 2 1/2-story, pedimented portico supported by Ionic order columns which was added during the 1909 remodeling. The exterior surface of polychrome Flemish bond brick was also added at this time.

Immediately north of the house is Memorial Park - formerly known as the Public Square, which has a Civil War monument and a modern gazebo. Immediately north of the park is the Clarion County Courthouse. Most buildings in the neighborhood were originally residences, but have been converted to commercial uses.

== History ==
Thomas Sutton, Jr. (1815-1853) was a lawyer from Indiana County, Pennsylvania, who move to Clarion about 1846 with his new wife Anne. He built a small brick law office on the property a block south of the courthouse and then the house on the same lot. The law office has since been destroyed. He died six years after the house was built, and his widow lived in the house until 1862, when she sold it for $2,000 to William J. Reynolds. Other owners included C.C. Brosius (1872–74), Nathan Meyers (1874-92), his widow Sue Meyers (1892-1907), and John Reed (1907-1908).

John Ditz, a hardware merchant, bought the house in 1908 for $7,000 and remodeled it. Ditz's hardware business was successful but he lost money in the Florida land boom of the 1920s, and converted the house into "tourist rooms" in the 1930s while still living there. After his death in 1941, his wife Minnie owned the house and lived in it until her death in 1972 at age 92. The Clarion County Historical Society bought the house in 1975 and it now houses the Society's museum.
