= WKFT =

WKFT may refer to:

- WKFT (FM), a radio station (101.3 FM) licensed to Strattanville, Pennsylvania, United States
- WKFT-TV, the former callsign of WUVC-DT, a television station (PSIP 40.1/RF38) licensed to Fayetteville, North Carolina, United States
