= Laura Rosamond White =

American author and editor

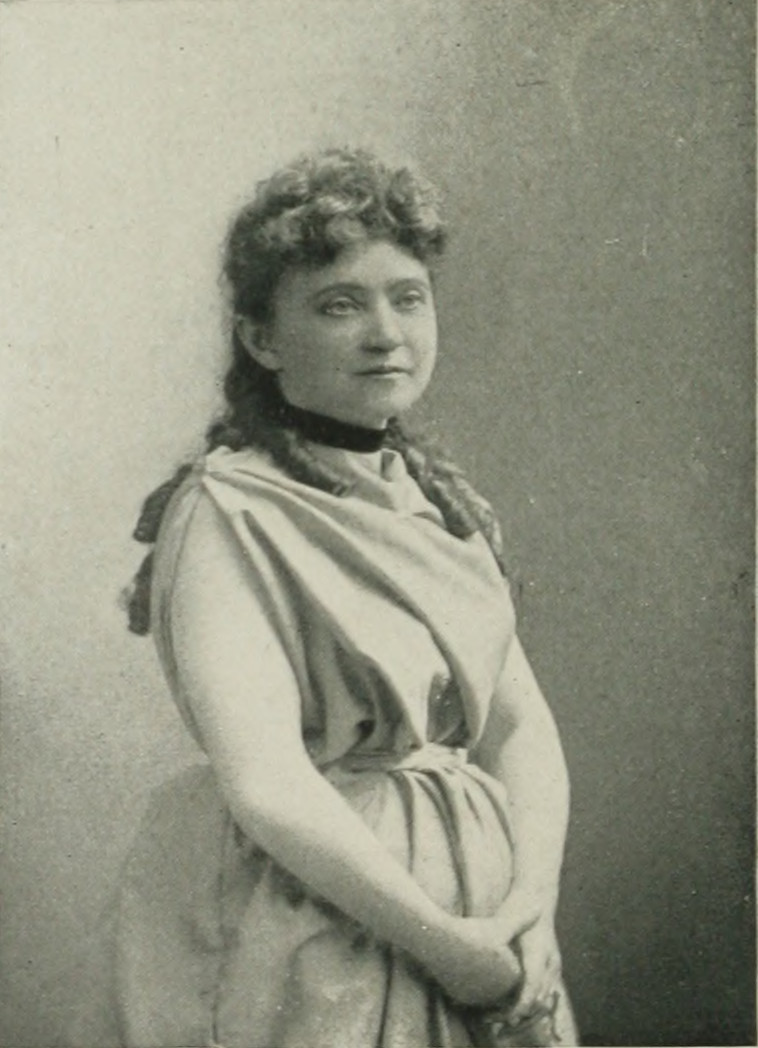
- "A Woman of the Century"
- Born: Laura Rosamond Harvey; October 23, 1844 Otsego County, New York, U.S.
- Died: July 4, 1922 (aged 77) Geneva, Ohio, U.S.
- Occupation: author; editor; poet
- Spouse: George W. White (m. 1866)

Laura Rosamond White (October 23, 1844 – July 4, 1922) was an American author and editor whose work was affiliated with the Woman's Relief Corps, Woman's Christian Temperance Union (W.C.T.U.), and the Non-Partisan National Woman's Christian Temperance Union. She was also regarded as the poet of Geneva, Ohio, and served as city editor of the Geneva Times.

== Early life and education ==
Laura Rosamond Harvey was born in Otsego County, New York, October 23, 1844. Her parents removed when she was one year old, and part of her childhood was passed in Pennsylvania, and the remainder and her early girlhood in New York City. She was descended from a family of Huguenots, named Hervé, who fled from France to England during a time of great persecution. One branch settled in England, one in Scotland, and from a Franco-English alliance descended Dr. Harvey, who discovered the circulation of the blood. The family name became Anglicized from Hervé to Hervey, and then to Harvey. Her ancestors were among the Puritans and pioneers of America.

She early showed her fondness for intellectual pursuits, and was educated mostly in private schools and under private tutors.

== Career ==
Her contributions appeared in many journals and magazines, and some of them were widely copied. She was a versatile writer, and excelled in poems that express sentiment suggested by humanity, friendship and patriotism. She was not confined to the didactic and sentimental, and most of the time, discarded that style. Then she produced her finest poetic work. She possessed an element of the humorous, as frequently shown.

As a journalist, her prose articles covered a wide range of subjects. She was asked often to write for occasions such as the dedication of the National Woman's Relief Corps Home in Madison, Ohio. She was a prominent writer for the W.C.T.U. and in the Woman's Relief Corps, serving as Press Reporter for the Bowers Relief Corps, Geneva, Ohio. She served as the editor of the Temperance Tribune, the official organ of the Non-Partisan National Woman's Christian Temperance Union.

== Personal life ==
In 1866, she married George W. White (1845–?) in Canandaigua, New York.

Her home was in Geneva, Ohio. She died there July 4, 1922.

== Selected works ==
=== Poems ===
- "I.", 1884
- "My Guest", 1885
- "Philosophy", 1886
- "Somewhere in the World", 1886
- "Bridal and Burial", 1892
- "Hi Mother's Pie", 1892
- "Poem of Welcome", 1892
- "Signs", 1892
- "Music 'Mid de Corn", 1893
- "New Business", 1893
- "A Martha Washington Party", 1897
- "Immortal White City", 1897
- "The Rich Man's Christmas Story", 1898
- "Broken Bow", 1899
- "The Color-Bearer", 1908
- "Books", 1916

=== Articles ===
- "Susie's Experiment", 1892

=== Short stories ===
- "An Easter Idol", 1903
