= Clara Rankin Coblentz =

American temperance reformer and clubwoman (1863-1933)

- Born: Clara Amelia Rankin; August 19, 1863; Madison Furnace, Clarion County, Pennsylvania, U.S.
- Died: March 6, 1933 (aged 69); Clarion, Pennsylvania, U.S.
- Education: Carrier Seminary
- Occupations: temperance reformer; clubwoman
- Organization: Non-Partisan National Women's Christian Temperance Union
- Title: president
- Movement: temperance
- Board member of: Chautauqua Literary and Scientific Circle
- Spouse: George Weber Coblentz (m. 1886–1923)
- Children: 2

Clara Rankin Coblentz (August 19, 1863 – March 6, 1933) was an American temperance reformer and clubwoman. Coblentz held leadership positions in a number of organizations including president of the Non-Partisan National Women's Christian Temperance Union, the Presbyterian Foreign Missionary Society (Clarion), and the Home and Foreign Missionary Society (Clarion).

== Early life and education ==
Clara Amelia Rankin was born at Madison Furnace, Clarion County, Pennsylvania, August 19, 1863. Her parents were Calvin Alexander and Emma (Burnside) Rankin. There were six younger siblings: Kate, Lillie, Mary, Margaret, Alda, and William.

She was educated in Clarion High School, and graduated from Carrier Seminary (later Clarion State Normal School) in 1880.

Her family removed in 1869 to Clarion, Pennsylvania, where she assisted her father in his store until her marriage.

== Career ==
On January 19, 1886, at Clarion, she married George Weber Coblentz (1857–1923) of Columbus, Ohio. They had two children: Charles Rankin and Howard Burnside.

In 1903, the family removed to Ann Arbor, Michigan, but returned to Clarion in the following year. In 1915, they moved to Erie, Pennsylvania.

Coblentz was involved in the religious work of the Presbyterian church, and from early adulthood, took an active interest in social problems, particularly those dealing with the liquor traffic. She joined the Woman's Christian Temperance Union (WCTU) in 1878, and was a charter member of the Clarion County Union, which was organized in 1883. Her first active work was done as local and county superintendent of scientific temperance instruction, helping to secure the passage of a law requiring such instruction in the public schools of the State. After holding various offices in her local Union, she became president of it in 1890. The same year, she joined the Non-Partisan WCTU, becoming successively treasurer (1902) and president (1903) of the national organization. She was a leader of the unions which became auxiliary to the Women’s Christian Temperance Alliance in 1890, and was elected State president of the Alliance in 1915. Coblentz delivered frequent addresses on temperance.

Coblentz was a member of the Chautauqua Woman's, Clarion Woman's, and Chautauqua Press clubs. She held a number of leadership roles. These included first vice-president, Chautauqua, New York, Daughters of the American Revolution Circle; trustee, class of 1907, Chautauqua Literary and Scientific Circle; recording secretary, State Federation of Pennsylvania Women; and recording secretary, Woman's Club of Chautauqua, New York. While in the role of chair of the Juvenile Court Committee of the State Federation of Women's Club, 1909–11, she prepared a leaflet on juvenile laws of Pennsylvania for the use of clubwomen which was favorably received.

Coblentz taught parliamentary law in her hometown, and Sunday school. She worked as a newspaper correspondent and gave addresses on temperance and religious subjects. Though she favored limited suffrage, she thought women were not ready for it.

== Death ==
Clara Rankin Coblentz was sick for about year before she died at her home in Clarion on March 6, 1933.
