= Autumn Leaf Festival =

Annual festival in America

- Status: Active
- Frequency: Annual
- Location: Clarion, Pennsylvania
- Country: United States
- Inaugurated: 1953
- Most recent: September 28 – October 6, 2024
- Next event: October 18–26, 2025
- Website: clarionpa.com/autumn-leaf-festival/

The Allegheny Autumn Leaf Festival is a nine-day annual festival held in Clarion, Pennsylvania. The event features food, entertainment, and carnival rides. PennWest Clarion hosts its annual homecoming football game and concerts during the festival, which is attended by almost 500,000 people annually.

== History ==
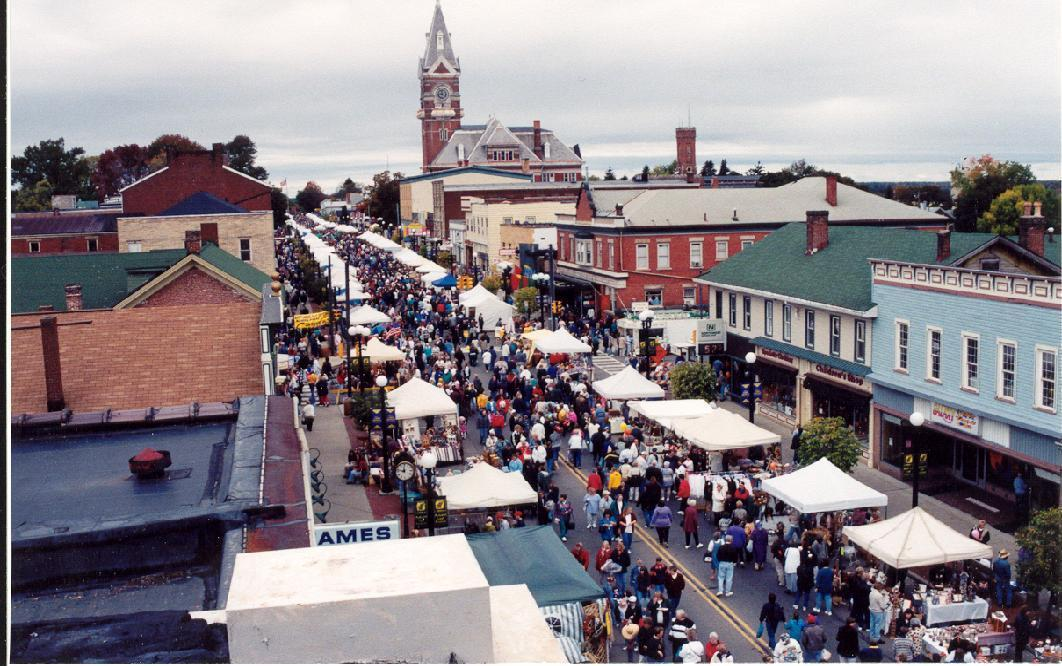
A picture of Crafters' Day during the Autumn Leaf Festival.

The Autumn Leaf Festival's origins trace back to 1953, coinciding with Clarion State College's homecoming celebration when local businesses were encouraged to decorate their storefronts.

In 1954, organizers implemented a two-part strategy to attract visitors. The first parade featured veterans' organizations, youth groups, emergency service personnel, community service clubs, a designated "Autumn Leaf Queen" float, and musical ensembles from seven Clarion County schools. Two and a half hours later, a separate homecoming parade showcased floats created by local fraternities and sororities in collaboration with Clarion State Teachers College.

By 1956, the annual "Tournament of Leaves" parade had become central to the Clarion State Teachers College Homecoming festivities. Local businesses actively participated by offering cash prizes for the most creative movie-themed float.

In 1958, the Clarion Chamber of Commerce established the Autumn Leaf Festival as a permanent fixture on the community calendar, and designated a committee to oversee its annual organization. The Miss Teen Autumn Leaf Festival scholarship pageant, which began as a homecoming queen platform within the parade, was formally established in 1977.

=== Farmers and Crafters' Day ===
In 1977, the first Farmers' and Merchants' Day Craft Show (later renamed Farmers and Crafters' Day) was held. It was typically held on the final Friday of the nine-day festival. Over 10,000 people are able to purchase or showcase handcrafted goods displayed along Clarion's main thoroughfare.

Notably, Pennsylvania West University, Clarion strategically schedules a "mid-semester break" coinciding with the following day, allowing students to participate in the festivities.

== Past Autumn Leaf Festival themes ==
| Year | Theme |
|---|---|
| 1965 | "I-80: Main Street, USA" |
| 1966 | No Autumn Leaf Festival was held |
| 1967 | "100 Years of Education" |
| 1968 | "America, the Beautiful" |
| 1969 | "Time and Space" |
| 1970 | "Man, and His Environment" |
| 1971 | "Accent on Youth" |
| 1972 | "Gay Nineties" |
| 1973 | "Peace the World Awaited" |
| 1974 | "Pennsylvania Revisited" |
| 1975 | "Wonderful World of Animation" |
| 1976 | "American, Let's Celebrate" |
| 1977 | "Autumn Wonderland" |
| 1978 | "ALF Silver Anniversary" |
| 1979 | "A Child's Fantasy" |
| 1980 | "Energy: Rainbow to the Future" |
| 1981 | "America Goes Country" |
| 1982 | "Clarion Gets Physically Fit" |
| 1983 | "Clarion Salutes the Movies" |
| 1984 | "Autumn Art Spectacular" |
| 1985 | "Clarion Salutes Miss Liberty" |
| 1986 | "Pennsylvania Higher Education - 100 Autumns in Clarion" |
| 1987 | "Volunteers" |
| 1988 | "Clarion's Colorful Heritage" |
| 1989 | "Clarion County's Sesquicentennial Celebration" |
| 1990 | "90's Clarion Celebrates World Freedom" |
| 1991 | "Clarion County Proud and Productive" |
| 1992 | "Discover Autumn in Clarion County" |
| 1993 | "Clarion County Through the Years" |
| 1994 | "Celebrate the Season" |
| 1995 | "Autumn's Tapestry" |
| 1996 | "Carousel of Colors" |
| 1997 | "Pennsylvania's Outstanding Community" |
| 1998 | "Autumn in the Air" |
| 1999 | "An Autumn Mardi Gras" |
| 2000 | "Twenty Centuries of Autumn" |
| 2001 | "Pinnacle of Success" |
| 2002 | "There's No Place Like Home" |
| 2003 | "Leaves of Gold" |
| 2004 | "Clarion's Treasure Chest of Leaves" |
| 2005 | "Autumn Leaves You Breathless" |
| 2006 | "A Symphony of Color" |
| 2007 | "Autumn Magic" |
| 2008 | "Cruise into Autumn" |
| 2009 | "Clarion River's Show of Leaves" |
| 2010 | "Celebration of Nature" |
| 2011 | "An Autumn to Remember" |
| 2012 | "Autumn's Quilt of Colors" |
| 2013 | "Diamond Jubilee" |
| 2014 | "An Autumn Safari" |
| 2015 | "Clarion: A Canvas of Color" |
| 2016 | "Autumn Through the Looking Glass" |
| 2017 | "Leaves of Blue and Gold Celebrating Clarion University's 150 Anniversary" |
| 2018 | "A Timeless Tradition" |
| 2019 | "An American Autumn" |
| 2020 | "Falling into the Future" |
| 2021 | "Turn Over a New Leaf" |
| 2022 | "Autumn Adventures" |
| 2023 | "Groovin' Into Autumn" |
| 2024 | "Flavors of Fall" |
| 2025 | "Meet Me on Main" |
