= Old Town Historic District (Clearfield, Pennsylvania) =

Historic district in Pennsylvania, United States

- U.S. National Register of Historic Places
- U.S. Historic district
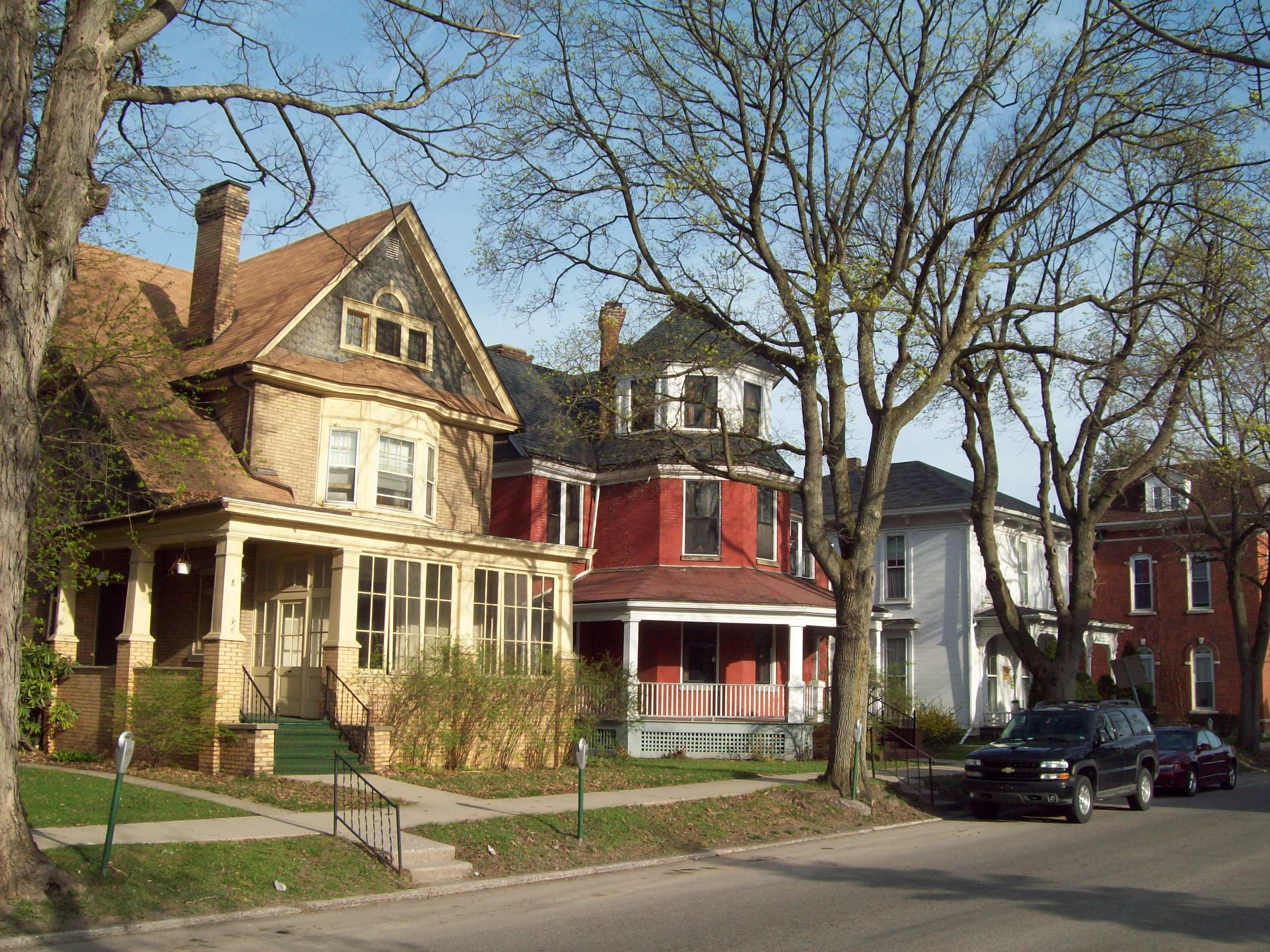
- Old Town Historic District, April 2010

- Location within Pennsylvania Location within the United States
- Location: Irregular pattern along Front St., Clearfield, Pennsylvania
- Coordinates: 41°1′20″N 78°26′24″W
- Area: 11 acres (4.5 ha)
- Architect: Multiple
- Architectural style: Late Victorian, Greek Revival
- NRHP reference No.: 79002212
- Added to NRHP: May 15, 1979

Old Town Historic District is a national historic district located at Clearfield, Clearfield County, Pennsylvania. The district includes 19 contributing buildings in Clearfield. The district is exclusively residential and consists of notable Victorian style dwellings built from 1860 to 1890.

It was added to the National Register of Historic Places in 1979.
