= WKQL =

Coordinates: 41.068°N 79.083°W

- Brookville, Pennsylvania; United States
- Broadcast area: Brookville/DuBois, Pennsylvania
- Frequency: 103.3 MHz
- Branding: Kool 103.3

Programming
- Format: Classic hits
- Affiliations: Westwood One

Ownership
- Owner: Renda Media; (Renda Radio, Inc.)
- Sister stations: WECZ, WPXZ

History
- First air date: February 14, 2000
- Call sign meaning: Kool (The Q substitutes for the first O)

Technical information
- Licensing authority: FCC
- Facility ID: 81912
- Class: B1
- ERP: 10,500 watts
- HAAT: 151 meters

Links
- Public license information: Public file; LMS
- Webcast: Listen Live
- Website: kool1033fm.com

WKQL (103.3 FM) is a classic hits formatted radio station. The station is licensed to Brookville, Pennsylvania. Owned by Renda Media, it maintains its transmitter facility, but the station's programming and administration functions originate in Punxsutawney, where it shares studio space with its affiliate stations WPXZ and WECZ.

Since signing on the air for the first time in February 2000, this station had used the call letters WYTR, but had always maintained an oldies format, through ABC/SMN's Classic Hits (formerly "Oldies Radio") music format. At the time of its initial sign on, the station had very briefly used the call letters WBEU. Another set of call letters, WBKV (for Brookville), were proposed but never used.

WKQL "Kool 103.3" serves Clarion, Clearfield, Elk, Forest, Indiana, Jefferson, Armstrong, and Cambria counties. The station added a local website (oldiesradioonline.com is ABC/SMN's site) http://www.kool1033fm.com/ in September 2007.

== History ==
The groundwork for WKQL was laid in the mid 1990s, when Anthony F. Renda, president of Renda Broadcasting Corporation, wanted to put a new radio station on the air that would also, in part, serve his hometown of Indiana, Pennsylvania.

Through a series of engineering maneuvers, Renda learned that 103.3 could go on the air with a powerful regional signal if some signal shuffling among other FM's in northwest Pennsylvania occurred. This affected stations in his hometown of Indiana, his co-owned property in neighboring Punxsutawney, and competing stations in St. Mary's, Brookville, Barnesboro, Emporium, Reynoldsville and Clearfield.

It took some time for the maneuvers to occur, but all of them were complete within four years. A new tower was built on a massive hillside on the outskirts of Brookville. There were many construction delays because of poor access, no electricity was available in the area, and unable to afford the station remaining silent any longer, Kool 103.3 finally went on the air in February 2000, using a gasoline-powered generator to provide electricity to the station's transmitter. The station finally had hard-wired electricity at the transmitter site less than six months later.

WKQL, though licensed to Brookville, converted former newsroom studio space for its sister stations in Punxsutawney to that of a permanent live on-air studio.

== WKQL today ==
WKQL continues as KOOL 103.3, playing classic hits, and is also the radio home of Brookville Raiders football and basketball play-by-play broadcasts.
