= Clearfield Alliance Christian School =

Private school in Pennsylvania, US

Coordinates: 41.03040°N 78.41071°W

- 56 Alliance Road; Clearfield, Pennsylvania

Information
- Type: Private Christian
- Religious affiliation: Christian and Missionary Alliance
- Grades: K-12
- Student to teacher ratio: n/a
- Campus type: Rural
- Colors: Red & White
- Mascot: Crusaders

Clearfield Alliance Christian School is a private Christian school located near the borough of Clearfield, Pennsylvania, in Clearfield County, Pennsylvania. The school has been serving students since it was established in 1982.

== Sports ==
- Boys Basketball
- Girls Basketbal
