= Non-Partisan National Woman's Christian Temperance Union =

American anti-alcohol association

Non-Partisan National Women's Christian Temperance Union was an American temperance association organized at Cleveland, Ohio, January 22, 1890, as a protest against the attitude of the Woman's Christian Temperance Union (W.C.T.U.) toward political parties.

== History ==
The organization was formed by women who objected to political action taken by the W.C.T.U., an objection which already had caused some secession from that body. Ohio organized a non-partisan union in 1886, and there were various other non-partisan bodies subsequently formed. When the Non-Partisan National Woman's Christian Temperance Union was organized, Pennsylvania had already followed Ohio's example, and was represented in the new movement by a State union.

The first annual convention was held at Alleghany City, Pennsylvania, in November 1890, subsequent to a call on October 28, 1890, for a National convention of the Non-Partisan National Woman's Christian Temperance Union:—

To the Non-Partisan Temperance Women of the Nation: A little over nine months ago, the reasons for an uncompromised, unequivocal and untrammeled National organization of temperance women were given to the public at large, followed soon after by a rallying call, not only to the members of Non-Partisan Woman's Christian Temperance unions and members of other unions opposed to the partisan alliance, but to women outside of the organizations were are in sympathy with our principles and methods, to attend a mass convention in Cleveland, O., January 22, 23, 24, 1890. This convention was attended by women from eleven States and the District of Columbia and its outcome was the organization of the Non-Partisan National Woman's Christian Temperance Union. The reasons which led to this separate organization still exist. Although this movement has led the parent society and many of its auxilliaries to repudiate partisanship by official utterances and otherwise, the facts remain the same and the necessity for a new rallying center for the non-partisan temperance women of the Nation has been further emphasized in the experiences of the year. Our platform is board enough for all. Neither denominal creeds nor party preferences are a test of membership nor of loyalty in the new organization; total abstinence from all intoxicating beverages, fealty to gospel temperance work, and the payment of dues is the simple basis on which we unite for the extinction of the deadly enemy against which we are arrayed.

Other State unions formed in at least 14 States and there was a district union in the District of Columbia. The work of this organization was almost wholly educational, its efforts being to reach every class of the population, child, youth, and adult, with proven facts regarding the drink habit and traffic.

The Seventh Annual Convention was held in Washington, D.C., December 1897.

At the Eighth Annual Convention of the Non-Partisan National Women's Christian Temperance Union, held in Columbus, Ohio, January 1898, the officers elected were: President, Annie Turner Wittenmyer; vice-president, Mrs. T. B. Walker; corresponding secretary, Ellen J. Phinney; recording secretary, Etta B. Hurford; treasurer, Mrs. H. M. Ingham. In the same year, a new organization was formed at Cleveland, the Educational Temperance Confederation. In addition to the Non-Partisan National Women's Christian Temperance Union, it included the International Organisation of Good Templars, the W.C.T.U., the Catholic Total Abstinence Union of America, the Royal Templars of Temperance, and the Anti-Saloon League. Its object was to make known the hygienic effects of alcohol, by means of illustrated lectures. The work was carried on by an executive committee composed of two members from each of the affiliated organizations.

In 1903, the officers of the union were: President, vacant; vice-president, Mrs. E. B. Harford; general secretary, Ellen J. Phinney; treasurer, Clara Rankin Coblentz; recording secretary, Emma A. Fowler; evangelist and organizer, Isabel Plumb. The organizations efforts were directed through several departments, each having its secretary, which in 1903 were: educational, Susanna F. Savery; legislative, Lydia H. Tilton; Sunday-school work, Mrs. H. S. Ellis; rescue work, Agnes C. Paul; industrial training; army, navy and marine corps work, Rachel C. Levy; young people's work, Clara Rankin Coblentz; evangelistic, Eliza A. Potter; and editor, Temperance Tribune, Laura Rosamond White.
