= WECZ =

Coordinates: 40°57′36″N 79°00′08″W

- Punxsutawney, Pennsylvania; United States
- Broadcast area: Punxsutawney – DuBois
- Frequency: 1540 kHz
- Branding: 100.9 The Groundhog

Programming
- Format: Country
- Affiliations: Westwood One

Ownership
- Owner: Renda Media; (Renda Radio, Inc.)
- Sister stations: WKQL, WPXZ-FM

History
- First air date: March 18, 1953 (as WPME)
- Former call signs: WPME (1953–1981); WPXZ (1981–1987)
- Call sign meaning: EZ 1540 (former branding)

Technical information
- Licensing authority: FCC
- Facility ID: 55710
- Class: D
- Power: 5,000 watts day 1,000 watts critical hours
- Translator: 100.9 W265DI (Punxsutawney)

Links
- Public license information: Public file; LMS
- Webcast: Listen Live
- Website: www.yourgroundhog.com

WECZ (1540 AM) is an American commercially licensed daytime-only radio station, licensed to serve the community of Punxsutawney, Pennsylvania. The station operates with a power of 5,000 watts daytime, and 1,000 watts during critical hours. WECZ is owned by Renda Media, a wholly owned subsidiary of Renda Broadcasting Corporation of Pittsburgh.

WECZ is simulcast over W265DI, an FM translator also licensed to Punxsutawney. The translator operates on 100.9 MHz, with 250 watts effective radiated power. The translator had been initially licensed to Oswego, New York as W231BK and under the ownership of Bath, New York–based Family Life Ministries. Renda Radio, Inc. purchased the translator from Family Life Ministries on January 27, 2016, for $120,000. The transaction includes two other FM translators held by Family Life Ministries that were sold to Renda Radio.

== History ==
=== Beginnings as WPME ===
WECZ became Jefferson County's very first radio station, having signed on the air in 1953 as WPME. The call letters were formed by the first letter of the last names of the station's three founding owners; Sheridan Pruett, Frank Miller, and Charles Erhard, doing business as Punxsutawney Broadcasting Company. The station began with a daytime-only power output of 1,000 watts, with studios at 103 North Gilpin Street in downtown Punxsutawney.

In the 1970s, WPME used the slogan "Western Pennsylvania's Musical Experience, WPME."

Until the early 1980s, WPME had an auxiliary studio on Main Street, and later 100 Franklin Avenue in Brookville, PA. A Brookville reporter reported Brookville area news, and news from the Jefferson County Courthouse there.

Like other small, community radio stations, WPME was a full-service station that offered music, news, and other local programming to local listeners daily from sunrise to sunset. Another AM station, WPXY, an Allegheny Mountain Network station, came on the air that same year, but was off the air by 1956.

WPME underwent a major change in 1973, when it was granted a license for an FM station and moved to a new, larger building in Young Township, just north of the Punxsutawney border on PA Route 36, and co-located with its transmitter facility.

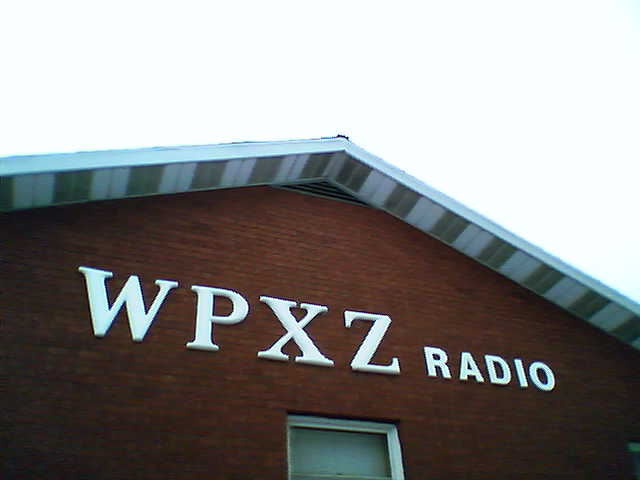
WECZ resides in the WPXZ studio building at 904 North Main Street Extension (PA Route 36 North) in Young Township, its home since the early 1970s. Prior to the callsign change, this was known as the WPME Building, with the callsign reflecting the same.

The station signed on as WPME-FM and operated as a simulcast of the AM station's programming, allowing it to offer listeners local radio service after WPME signed off at sunset.

=== Changes: as WPXZ ===
Both stations were sold in 1981 to Anthony F. Renda, a native of Indiana, Pennsylvania, about 25 miles south of Punxsutawney. Renda had owned two other radio stations in McKeesport and Eastcentral Ohio before purchasing WPME-AM-FM for $300,000.

Upon purchasing the station, Renda changed the callsigns of the stations to WPXZ & WPXZ-FM, to more accurately reflect the station's image as that of a Punxsutawney community-based radio station. The station still continued its AM-FM simulcast until 1989, when the stations split off into separate programming entities.

=== WECZ: AM and FM go separate ways ===
In 1987 WPXZ retained its call letters for the FM station, but the AM adopted the calls WECZ and an easy-listening format of satellite-delivered MOR and nostalgia music. The new station became known as "Easy 1540" and continued operating under this format for about six years. The station also aired Pittsburgh Pirates baseball day games, and syndicated talk show host Rush Limbaugh.

The station underwent another image overhaul in the late 1990s, switching to a classic country satellite-delivered format and taking the new name "The Groundhog AM 1540." Outcry from the community over the loss of the older music resulted in another format shift back to the MOR and Nostalgia music, but the Groundhog moniker was retained.

In 2002, the music was again dropped, with the increasing popularity of syndicated talk show hosts Laura Ingraham and Tom Martino. The station operated as "Groundhog Talk" for about a year until the moniker was dropped altogether and rebilled as "News/Talk AM 1540".

=== WECZ today ===
Sometime in the first quarter of 2019, WECZ AM 1540 and W265DI 100.9 FM became Fox Sports Punxsutawney, with an all-sports format by Fox Sports Radio. The "Polka" Mike show moved to sister station WPXZ 104.1 FM.

On March 1, 2023, WECZ and its FM translator changed formats from sports to country, branded as "Groundhog Country".
