= Clarion News =

- Type: Weekly newspaper
- Format: Broadsheet
- Editor: Ryan S. Pugh
- Founded: 1843
- Language: English
- Headquarters: 860 S. Fifth Avenue, Suite 4, Clarion, PA United States
- Circulation: 6,800
- OCLC number: 2259441
- Website: theclarionnews.com

The Clarion News is a twice weekly newspaper in Clarion in the U.S. State of Pennsylvania. It was founded 1843 and covers local news, sports, business and community events. The newspaper is published on Tuesday and Thursday. According to the American Newspaper Representatives, the newspaper has a paid circulation of 6,800 copies.

== History ==
Originally known as the Democrat Register, it was founded on April 26, 1843 by D. W. Foster as a Whig paper. In 1845, Foster resigned, handing editorial control to Parker Purviance, a Butler, Pennsylvania attorney, who subsequently sold it to his brother-in-law A. J. Gibson.

In 1852, it was purchased by Samuel Young, who changed the name to the Independent Banner in 1856. Under that name, the paper initially continued to take a Whig position, supporting Fillmore as an alternative to Buchanan in 1856, primarily on "Freedom for Kansas" grounds.

Young continued to run the paper until 1869, with a brief absence after he was drafted into the Union Army in 1863. The paper opposed the Republican nominee for congress, C. W. Gilfillan, in 1869. Gilfillan bought out the paper in 1869, changing the paper's name to the Republican, thereby eliminating a major opponent in the press. Gilfillan would go on to lose the election in a close 1870 race against Democrat Samuel Griffith and would sell the paper in 1871.

By 1876, the paper had a circulation of over 1,500, and was being printed on Fridays by the Republican Printing Company. J. B. Patrick took the helm in 1883, and after a long tenure as editor and publisher leased the paper to W. C. Miltenberger and W. H. Pickens in 1896. Pickens died shortly afterward, and Miltenberger bought out both his share and the publishing plant still held by Patrick. The paper continued a bitter war with political rival the Clarion Democrat, with the Democrat attacking Miltenberger's influence on "every paper he has ever blighted with the special brand of rot he is only capable of writing and which is supposed to be the result of an admixture of egotism and molasses on the brain."

In 1901, Miltenberger moved to Idaho for health reasons. When he died in 1904, he was described by the Democrat as "a man of most genial temperment [sic]...accommodating and obliging to a fault, being always inspired by kindly and generous sentiments."

After Miltenberger's 1901 departure, the role of editor and publisher was taken over by Jay E. Fitz. John P. Baker became editor of the paper in 1932 and remained with the paper until 1936. W.C. Hearst became publisher of the Clarion Republican in 1941 and later became publisher of the Clarion Democrat in 1948.

In 1965, the Clarion Republican and the Clarion Democrat were purchased from W.C. Hearst by Western Pennsylvania Newspaper Company and Homer L. Watson was named publisher. The papers were combined and renamed as Clarion News.
