= WKFT (FM) =

Radio station in Strattanville, Pennsylvania

Coordinates: 41°19′47″N 79°15′28″W

Simulcast of WWCH, Clarion
- Strattanville, Pennsylvania; United States
- Broadcast area: Clarion, Pennsylvania; Brookville, Pennsylvania; Marienville, Pennsylvania
- Frequency: 101.3 MHz
- Branding: Bigfoot Legends 101.3 & 94.1

Programming
- Format: Classic country

Ownership
- Owner: Seven Mountains Media; (Southern Belle, LLC)
- Sister stations: WCCR-FM, WIFT, WLUI, WMRF-FM, WQQP, WWCH

History
- First air date: 2013 (as WZDD)
- Former call signs: WZDD (2012–2017)
- Call sign meaning: "Bigfoot"

Technical information
- Licensing authority: FCC
- Facility ID: 165990
- Class: A
- ERP: 4,300 watts
- HAAT: 115 meters (377 ft)

Links
- Public license information: Public file; LMS
- Webcast: Listen Live
- Website: bigfootlegendsradio.com

WKFT (101.3 MHz) is a commercial FM radio station in Strattanville, Pennsylvania, United States. The station broadcasts a classic country format with sister station WWCH (1300 AM and 94.1 FM) and is owned by Seven Mountains Media, through licensee Southern Belle, LLC.

== History ==
On May 30, 2017, WZDD changed their format from mainstream rock, simulcasting WZDB (95.9) in Sykesville, to country, branded as "Bigfoot Country 102.1 & 101.3" and simulcast with WIFT (102.1) in DuBois. On September 25, 2023, WKFT broke from the simulcast with WIFT and began simulcasting a classic country format, "Bigfoot Legends", with WWCH (1300 AM), which Seven Mountains Media had acquired earlier in the year; WWCH had previously carried a similar format as "The Goat".
