= Buchanan Furnace =

- U.S. National Register of Historic Places
- Pennsylvania state historical marker
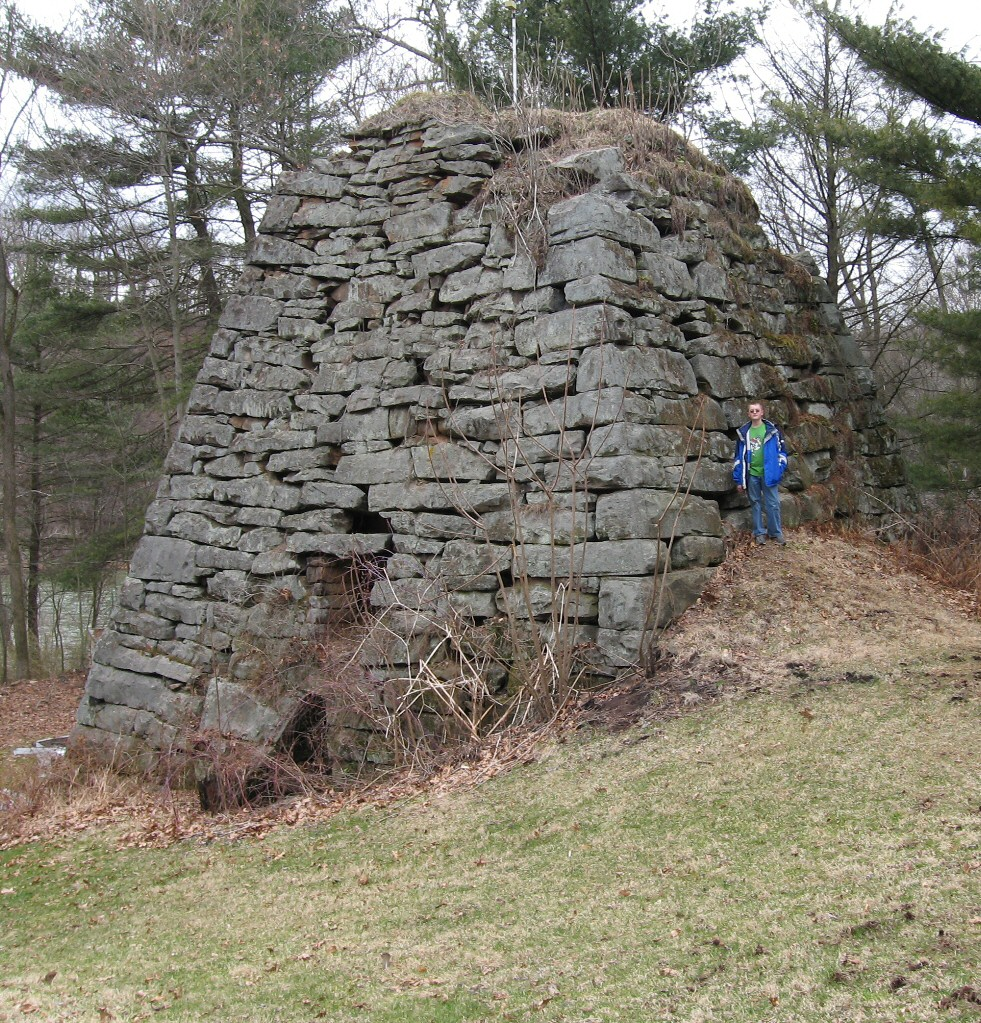

- Location within Pennsylvania Location within the United States
- Location: Off Pennsylvania Route 378 at the Clarion River near Callensburg, Licking Township, Pennsylvania
- Coordinates: 41°7′54″N 79°33′32″W
- Area: less than one acre
- Built: 1844
- Architectural style: Iron furnace
- MPS: Iron and Steel Resources of Pennsylvania MPS
- NRHP reference No.: 91001129

Significant dates
- Added to NRHP: September 06, 1991
- Designated PHMC: April 03, 1950

The Buchanan Furnace is a historic iron furnace located in Licking Township, Clarion County, Pennsylvania. It was built in 1844, and is a cold blast charcoal furnace measuring 30 by 33 feet (9.1 by 10.1 m) at the base and 33 feet (10 m) tall. It had a maximum production of 1,200 short tons (1,100 t) per year and was abandoned in 1858 because of a lack of timber to be used as fuel.

Thirty-one iron furnaces were built in Clarion County, mostly from 1840-1850. They supplied the region as well as the Pittsburgh rolling mills.

It was added to the National Register of Historic Places in 1991.
