= WPXZ-FM =

Adult Contemporary Radio station in Punxsutawney, Pennsylvania

Coordinates: 40.960°N 79.002°W

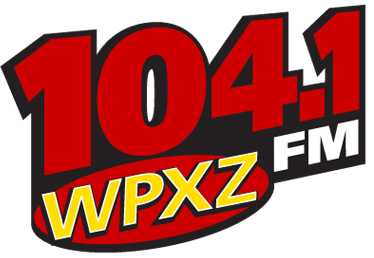
- Punxsutawney, Pennsylvania; United States
- Broadcast area: Punxsutawney, Pennsylvania/DuBois
- Frequency: 104.1 MHz
- Branding: 104.1 WPXZ

Programming
- Format: Adult contemporary, Sports

Ownership
- Owner: Renda Media; (Renda Radio Inc.)
- Sister stations: WECZ, WKQL

History
- First air date: December 12, 1973 (as WPME-FM at 105.5)
- Former call signs: WPME-FM (1973–1981)
- Former frequencies: 105.5 MHz (1973–1996)
- Call sign meaning: "Punxy" (nickname of Punxsutawney)

Technical information
- Licensing authority: FCC
- Facility ID: 55711
- Class: A
- ERP: 3,300 watts
- HAAT: 91 meters (299 ft)

Links
- Public license information: Public file; LMS
- Webcast: Listen Live
- Website: wpxz1041fm.com

WPXZ-FM is a commercial FM radio station licensed to Punxsutawney, Pennsylvania, known as the "Weather Capital of the World". The station operates at a federally assigned frequency of 104.1 MHz and an effective radiated power of 3,000 watts. WPXZ, and its co-located sister stations, WECZ and WKQL, are all owned by Pittsburgh-based Renda Media.

== History ==
=== WPME ===
Signing on at 105.5 MHz, WPXZ originated in December 1973 as WPME-FM, simulcasting with its then same-named daytime-only AM sister station, known today as WECZ. The stations were owned by the Punxsutawney Broadcasting Company, headed by Clearfield County native and Punxsutawney resident Charles M. "Charlie" Erhard Jr. (April 30, 1928 - July 12, 2004), who sold the stations to its present owner in 1981.

That year, the station pair would both be rebranded as WPXZ-AM-FM, continuing with simulcasting until 1989, when management finally began separate broadcasts. Seeing the FM station as the driving force of the two, the AM station would be rebranded under the WECZ call sign.

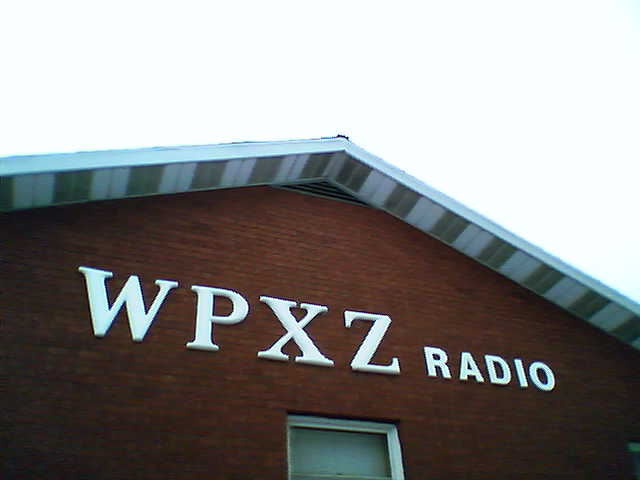
WPXZ studio building at 904 North Main Street Extension (PA Route 36 North) in Young Township, its home since the early 1970s.

While WECZ would adopt a format featuring big band, swing, and other types of nostalgia music aimed at an older demographic and branded as "Easy 1540," WPXZ-FM continued operating under an adult contemporary format, albeit with a full-service mindset. In addition to its music, the station's programming featured hourly national news from ABC News Radio, high school sports, Pittsburgh Pirates baseball broadcasts, American Top 40 with Casey Kasem (later Shadoe Stevens) broadcasts on weekends, and a wide variety of other locally-themed programming. The station went under the slogan name of "Music & More", and would also operate a second studio/office location in nearby Brookville for a period of 15 years, ending in the mid-1990s.

Then and now, WPXZ has provided a unique proving ground for young, up-and-coming radio talent. Dave Walters, Alan Freed, D.P. McIntire, Lou Jordan, and numerous others would take to the air and thrive in the format.

In 1996, Renda received permission to put another FM station on the air. In order for the new station to go on the air, many existing FM stations would have to shuffle their frequencies in order to fit the channel in its assigned community of Brookville, some 15 miles away from Punxsutawney. One of the affected stations was WPXZ. Renda gave up the 105.5 frequency for WPXZ to move to 104.1.

In a 2004 management change, WPXZ moved to a more CHR-based adult contemporary format in an effort to hip up WPXZ's stodgy image of tired music. The change also resulted in scaling back the station's news content, which did not go over well with listeners.

=== WPXZ today ===
In April 2005, WPXZ underwent management changes at the administrative, programming, and sales levels. Increased efforts at local news and sports, as well as community-oriented events, resulted in a very successful turnaround for all three stations. The music also shifted from a CHR-based AC to a 1980s oldies-based AC, which improved listenership.
