= Clearfield, Pennsylvania =

Borough in Pennsylvania, US

- Borough
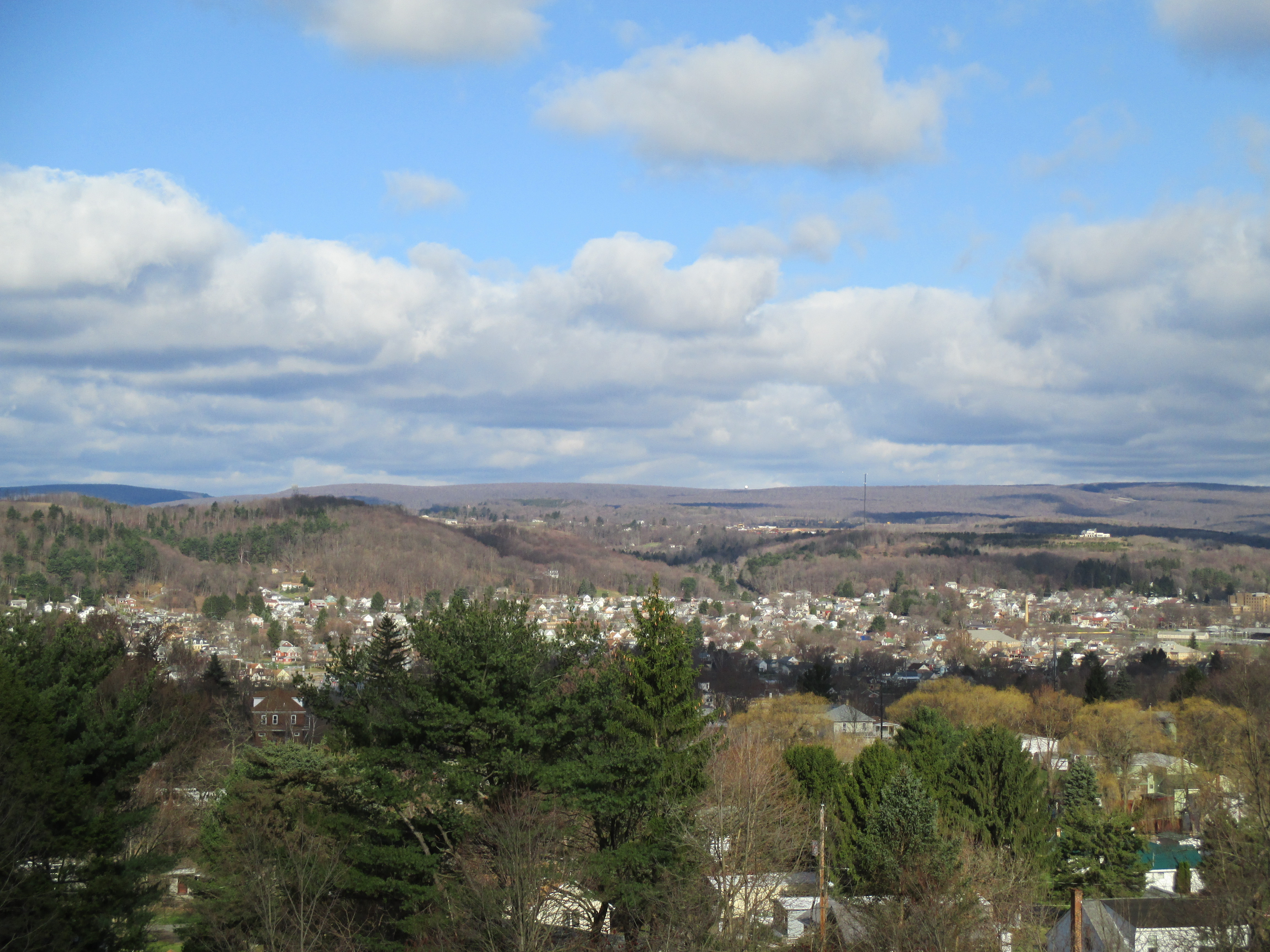
- Clearfield, Pennsylvania, looking west

- Location of Clearfield in Clearfield County, Pennsylvania.

- Map showing Clearfield County in Pennsylvania

- Pennsylvania Clearfield (the United States)
- Coordinates: 41°01′21″N 78°26′25″W
- Country: United States
- State: Pennsylvania
- County: Clearfield
- Settled: 1805
- Incorporated: 1840

Government
  - Type: Borough Council

Area
  - Total: 1.88 sq mi (4.87 km^{2})
  - Land: 1.80 sq mi (4.67 km^{2})
  - Water: 0.077 sq mi (0.20 km^{2})
- Elevation: 1,109 ft (338 m)

Population (2020)
  - Total: 5,962
  - Density: 3,307.1/sq mi (1,276.88/km^{2})
- Time zone: UTC-5 (Eastern (EST))
  - Summer (DST): UTC-4 (EDT)
- ZIP code: 16830
- Area code: 814
- FIPS code: 42-14064
- Website: clearfieldboro.com

Clearfield is a borough and the county seat of Clearfield County, Pennsylvania, United States. As of the 2020 census the population was 5,962 people, making it the second most populous community in Clearfield County, behind DuBois. The borough is part of the DuBois, PA Micropolitan Statistical Area, as well as the larger State College-DuBois, PA Combined Statistical Area. The settled area surrounding the borough consists of the nearby census-designated places of Hyde and Plymptonville, which combined with Clearfield have a population of approximately 8,237 people.

== Consolidation ==
In October 2015, a Clearfield/Lawrence Township Consolidation Committee first convened to discuss a potential merger between Lawrence Township and Clearfield. However, on August 1, 2017, Lawrence Township supervisors voted 2 to 1 against consolidation with Clearfield. The population of the new municipality would have been approximately 13,800, surpassing DuBois as the most populous community in the county.

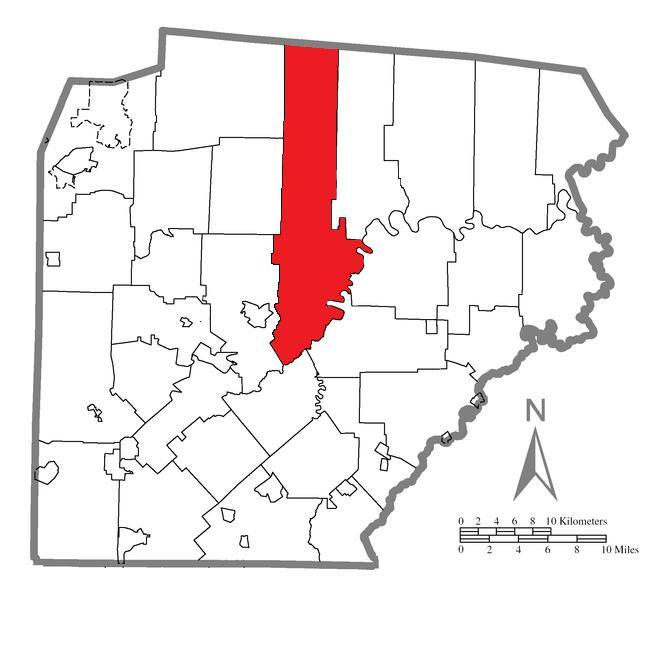
Location of the new municipality in Clearfield County if the vote passes in 2020.

== History ==
There were many trade routes and paths for Native Americans living and passing through Clearfield County up to the 1600s. One major Indian path at the time was the Great Shamokin Path, which started near the Indian village of Shamokin (now Sunbury) on the Susquehanna River and continued west past Lock Haven, to Chinklacamoose, now the borough of Clearfield. Finally the path ended at the village of Kittanning on the Allegheny River, which is now the modern town of the same name.

== National Register of Historic Places ==
Clearfield is home to four of Clearfield County's list of twenty National Registered Historic Places.

- Clearfield County Courthouse
- Dimeling Hotel
- Old Town Historic District
- Thomas Murray House

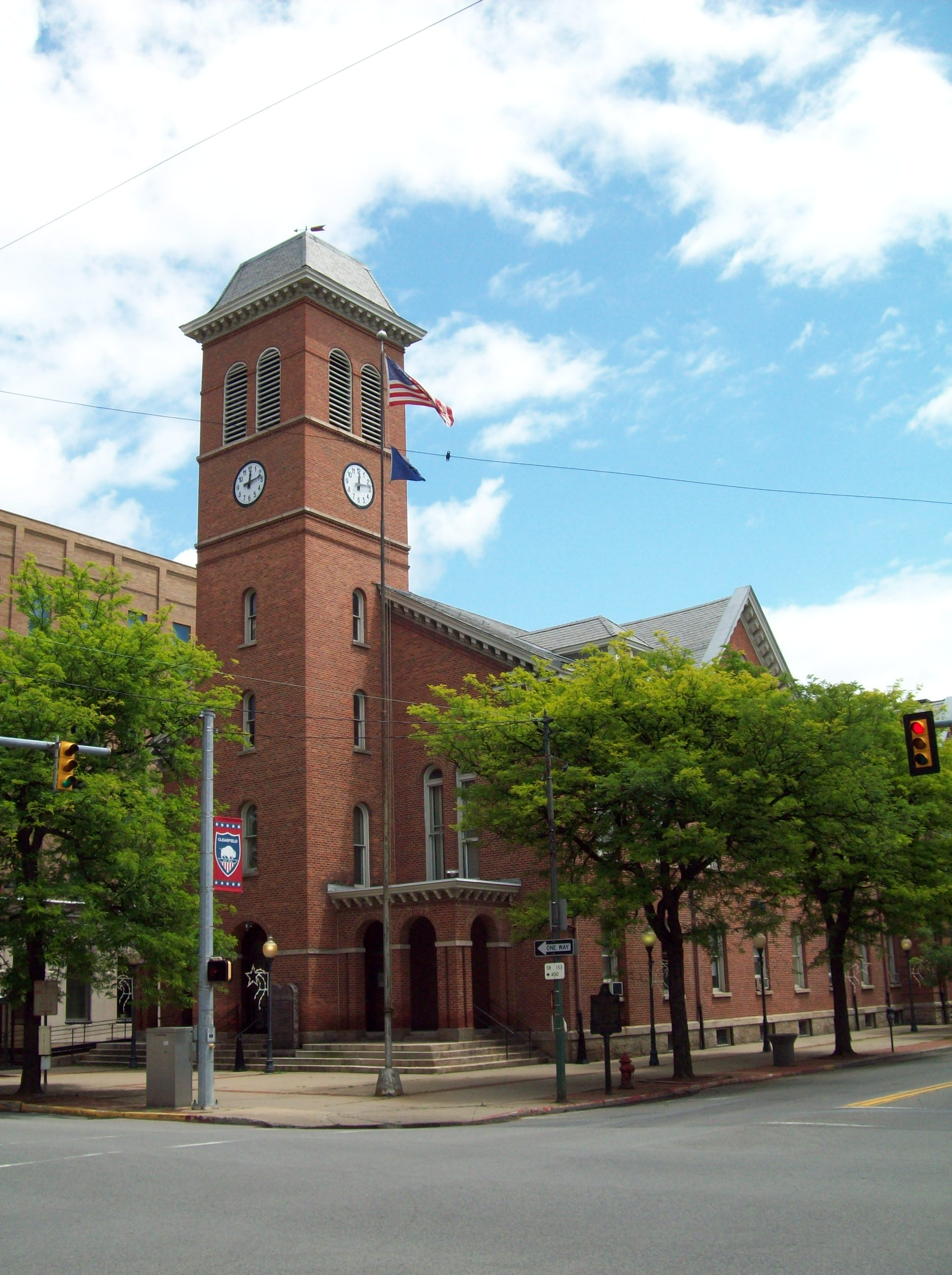
Clearfield County Courthouse

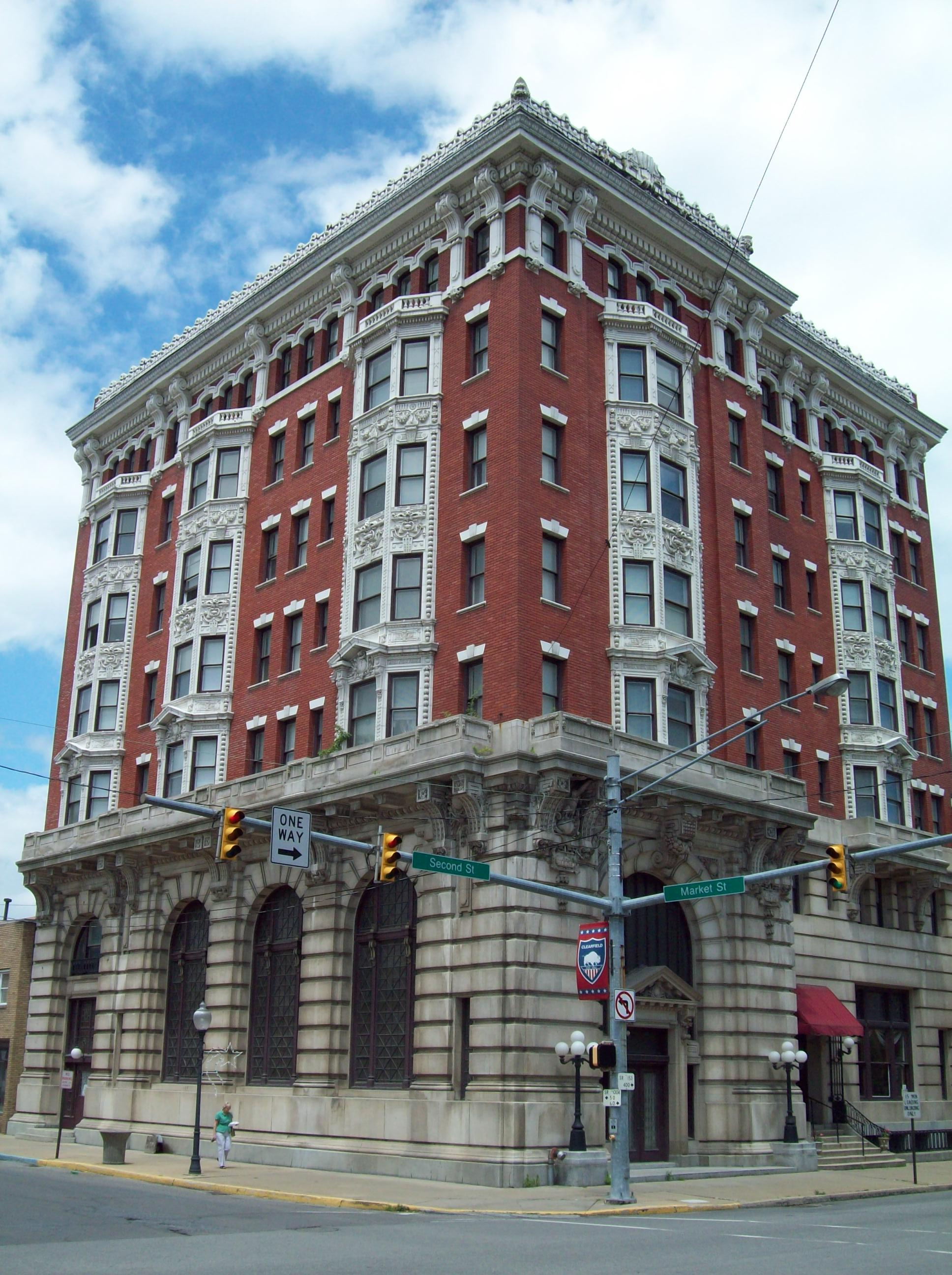
Dimeling Hotel

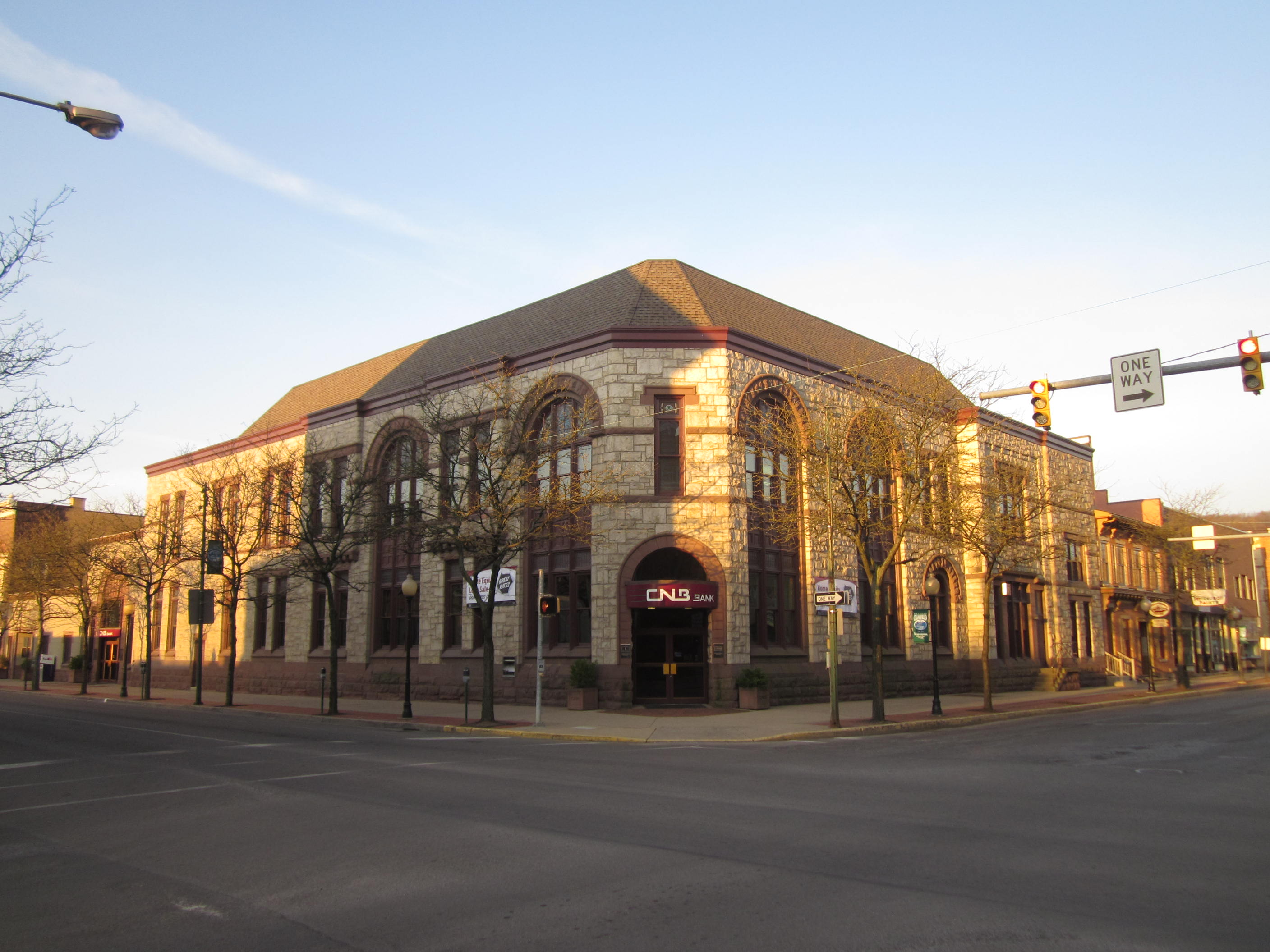
Downtown center Clearfield South 2nd Street and Market Street

== All-America City ==
In 1966, Clearfield was one of the winners of the All-America City Award, given annually to the top ten cities in the United States. The other nine cities included in the top ten list in 1966 were Pinellas County, Florida; Malden, Massachusetts; Ann Arbor, Michigan; Detroit, Michigan; Cohoes, New York; Greensboro, North Carolina; Richmond, Virginia; and Seattle, Washington.

== Geography ==
Clearfield is located near the center of Clearfield County along the West Branch of the Susquehanna River. Clearfield Creek joins the West Branch 2 miles (3 km) to the east (downstream) of town.

U.S. Route 322 passes through the borough, and Interstate 80 passes just to the north, with access from Exit 120 (Pennsylvania Route 879). Via US-322 and I-80, it is 22 miles (35 km) northwest to the city of DuBois. US-322 leads southeast 40 miles (64 km) to State College.

=== Adjacent counties ===
- Elk County (North)
- Cameron County (Northeast)
- Clinton County (Northeast)
- Cambria County (South)
- Blair County (Southeast)
- Indiana County (Southwest)
- Centre County (East)
- Jefferson County (West)

== Neighborhoods ==
- East End is a neighborhood within the borough of Clearfield. The area is located in the northeastern portion of the borough. The northern portion of East End is U.S. Route 322. The southern part is made up of Woodland Road and Cemetery Road ending at the old Hillcrest Cemetery. The former Bionol ethanol plant, now a grain processing plant, is in the East End. Just to the north of the plant is the Pennsylvania Lines Headquarters of the R.J. Corman Railroad.
- Golden Rod, sometimes referred to as Golden Rod Farms, is located along U.S. 322 to the east about a mile from Clearfield and very close to Lock Haven University of Pennsylvania Clearfield Campus, and is not with the borough boundary. The neighborhood is near the confluence of the West Branch of the Susquehanna River and Clearfield Creek. Clearfield Square is located between East End and Golden Rod.
- Hillsdale is located to the east of Clearfield, just outside the borough limits. The neighborhood is on a hill overlooking the borough. The boundary for this area is roughly from High Street (the borough boundary) to the west, to the Hillcrest Cemetery to the north, to Pennsylvania Route 879 to the east. Lock Haven University's Clearfield branch campus was once located in Hillsdale, but relocated to its current location along U.S. Route 322, about 2 miles (3 km) east of downtown.
- Kerr or more commonly known as Kerr Addition is located outside the borough limits on the north side of the West Branch Susquehanna River when the river makes a turn to the east. It is across the river from the East End neighborhood. The Clearfield County Career and Technology Center is located in Kerr Addition as well as major retail businesses. Kerr Addition is east of the census-designated place of Plymptonville.
- South Park or sometimes South Side is located mainly in the southern portion of the borough of Clearfield. It covers an area from the east bank of the West Branch of the Susquehanna River to Pennsylvania Route 879 to the south and east, and to Pennsylvania Route 153 to the north. Many old smaller mansion-style houses are located in the neighborhood which overlooks the river.
- West Side is located inside the borough boundary to the west of the West Branch Susquehanna River, north to U.S. Route 322. It is made up of many mid 19th-century homes, and it is the location of many businesses and churches, some of which use "West Side" in their names. One of the bigger churches, West Side United Methodist Church is located in the neighborhood. Clearfield Hospital is in the West Side near the northern boundary of the borough. The Clearfield County Fair occurs at the Clearfield County Fairgrounds, located in this area within the borough limits.

== Schools ==
- Clearfield Area School District
  - Clearfield Area Elementary School
  - Clearfield Area Junior/Senior High School
- Clearfield Alliance Christian School
- Commonwealth University of Pennsylvania - Clearfield
- St. Francis School

== Library ==
- Joseph and Elizabeth Shaw Public Library, founded in 1940.

== Demographics ==
Historical population
Census	Pop.	Note	%±
1850	503		—
1860	757		50.5%
1870	1,361		79.8%
1880	1,809		32.9%
1890	2,248		24.3%
1900	5,081		126.0%
1910	6,851		34.8%
1920	8,529		24.5%
1930	9,221		8.1%
1940	9,372		1.6%
1950	9,357		−0.2%
1960	9,270		−0.9%
1970	8,176		−11.8%
1980	7,580		−7.3%
1990	6,633		−12.5%
2000	6,631		0.0%
2010	6,215		−6.3%
2020	5,962		−4.1%

As of the census of 2010, there were 6,215 people, a drop of 6.3% from the 2000 census.3,070 households, and 1,740 families residing in the borough. The population density was 3,649.7 inhabitants per square mile (1,409.2/km^{2}). There were 3,326 housing units at an average density of 1,830.6 per square mile (706.8/km^{2}). The racial makeup of the borough was 93.1% White, 2.6% African American, 0.08% Native American, 1.6% Asian, 0.06% from other races, and 0.9% from two or more races. Hispanic or Latino of any race were 1.4% of the population.

There were 3,070 households, out of which 24.5% had children under the age of 18 living with them, 42.4% were married couples living together, 10.4% had a female householder with no husband present, and 43.3% were non-families. 38.5% of all households were made up of individuals, and 17.2% had someone living alone who was 65 years of age or older. The average household size was 2.13 and the average family size was 2.83.

In the borough the population was spread out, with 20.4% under the age of 18, 8.4% from 18 to 24, 28.3% from 25 to 44, 22.7% from 45 to 64, and 20.2% who were 65 years of age or older. The median age was 41 years. For every 100 females there were 89.6 males. For every 100 females age 18 and over, there were 84.9 males.

The median income for a household in the borough was $27,414, and the median income for a family was $40,095. Males had a median income of $29,972 versus $22,607 for females. The per capita income for the borough was $17,374. About 8.3% of families and 13.4% of the population were below the poverty line, including 14.6% of those under age 18 and 15.4% of those age 65 or over.

According to the United States Census Bureau, the borough has a total area of 1.9 square miles (4.9 km^{2}), of which, 1.8 square miles (4.7 km^{2}) of it is land and 0.1 square miles (0.26 km^{2}) of it (3.70%) is water.

== Notable people ==
- Willie Adams, major league baseball pitcher (1912–1919)
- Howie Bedell, major league baseball player
- William Bigler (January 1, 1814 – August 9, 1880), American politician, 12th Governor of Pennsylvania from 1852 to 1855, later U.S. Senator for Pennsylvania from 1856 until 1861
- Earl Caldwell, former reporter and columnist for The New York Times; first African-American to have a regular column in a major national newspaper; central figure in a major Supreme Court case about the protection of journalists' sources, hosts Pacifica's WBAI radio (New York City)
- Skip Cleaver, New Hampshire state legislator
- Otto Eppers, cartoonist/illustrator who as part of a stunt successfully jumped off the Brooklyn Bridge at 17 years of age
- Howard Fargo, former member of the Pennsylvania House of Representatives (1981–2000)
- Anthony A. Mitchell, clarinetist, composer and conductor; led the United States Navy Band from 1962 to 1968
- Rembrandt Cecil Robinson (1924–1972) was a United States Navy officer (Rear admiral)
- Edward Scofield, governor of Wisconsin (1897–1901)
- William Irvin Swoope, Republican member of the U.S. House of Representatives (1923–27)
- William A. Wallace, Democratic U.S. senator who served from 1875 to 1881
- Powell Weaver, composer and organist

== Media ==
=== Television ===
Clearfield receives television programming from the Johnstown-Altoona-State College, Pennsylvania media market. Public television station WPSU-TV is licensed to Clearfield.

=== Movies ===
Three feature films were shot on location in Clearfield County and downtown Clearfield by native Spencer Folmar. First in 2009 for the feature film, "Guilt & Sentence" (2010), and again in 2016 for the feature film "Generational Sins" (2017) starring the Australian actor, Daniel MacPherson. Recently the film Shooting Heroin also made by Folmar debuted and is a film inspired by true events about the opioid epidemic.

== Newspaper ==
Clearfield is covered by The Progress, published daily since 1913, and Gant Daily, published online since 2006.

== Radio ==
- WOKW 102.9 MHz in Curwensville, PA with Offices located in Clearfield, PA
- WPQP
- WIFT
- WCPA-AM 900 kHz
- WQQP 95.9 MHz
