= Clarion County Courthouse and Jail =

- U.S. National Register of Historic Places
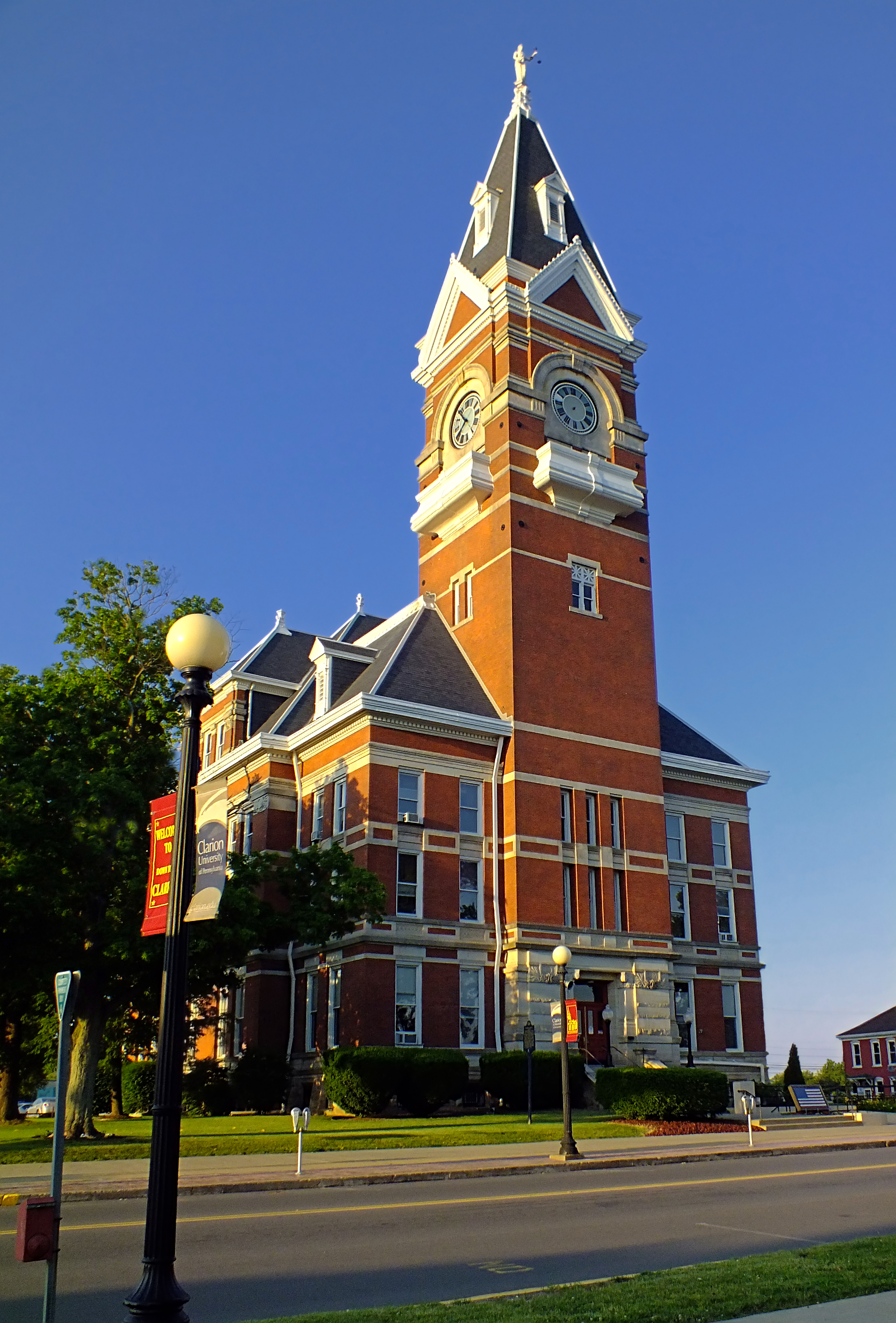
- Clarion County Courthouse, June 2012

- Location within Pennsylvania Location within the United States
- Interactive map showing the location of Clarion County Courthouse and Jail
- Location: Main St., Clarion, Pennsylvania
- Coordinates: 41°12′55″N 79°23′9″W
- Area: 2 acres (0.81 ha)
- Built: 1883-1885, 1873-1875
- Architect: Butz, Edward M.; McCullough, James Jr.
- Architectural style: Queen Anne, Romanesque
- NRHP reference No.: 79002208
- Added to NRHP: May 22, 1979

The Clarion County Courthouse and Jail is a historic courthouse and jail located in Clarion, Clarion County, Pennsylvania. The courthouse was built between 1883 and 1885, and is a 3 1/2-story, brick Victorian structure with Classical details measuring 78 feet, 8 inches, wide and 134 feet deep. It has a 213 foot tall, 25 feet square, clock tower. The jail was built between 1873 and 1875, and is a half brick / half sandstone building, located behind the courthouse.

It was added to the National Register of Historic Places in 1979.

== History ==
Two earlier courthouses were built on the site: the first was completed in 1843, the second in 1863. Both were built of brick and both were destroyed by fire. The second courthouse burned down on September 12, 1882.

Sixteen contractors bid to construct the current courthouse, with bids ranging between $88,370 and $135,000. P. H. Melvin made the winning bid. Construction started on July 6, 1883 and was scheduled to be completed on November 16, 1884, but actual completion was on October 14, 1885. On January 27, 1885 Melvin was removed as contractor and the three bondsmen became acting contractors, retaining Melvin as superintendent of construction. Total completed cost was $126,936. Melvin later sued the county for $40,000, apparently unsuccessfully, for failure to comply with the contracted conditions.

The architect was E.M. Butz of Allegheny, Pennsylvania (now part of Pittsburgh) who designed the building in the Queen Anne style and the supervising architect was D. English of Brockville. Henry Warner of Allegheny painted the frescos. The floor tiling was laid by the Star Encaustic Tile Company of Pittsburgh and the Howard Clock Company of New York supplied the 9-foot diameter clock dial and the 1313 pound bell. A galvanized iron sculpture called the "Lady of Justice", standing 9 feet 11 inches tall on top of the clock tower, is of unknown origin.

Changes and renovations to courthouse include:

- 1889 - gas illumination of the clock was added
- 1923 - electric lighting added
- 1977 - complete electrical re-wiring, and
- 1981 - a complete exterior renovation

The "Lady of Justice" was restored in 1981. About 25 bullet holes were in the statue and her left arm was missing. The statue was restored by Ranochak & Company of Shelbyville, Indiana with a fiberglass coating and fiberglass backing inside the statue. During the restoration the statue's weight doubled to 250 pounds.

== See also ==
- List of state and county courthouses in Pennsylvania
