= Strattanville, Pennsylvania =

Borough in Pennsylvania, US

- Borough
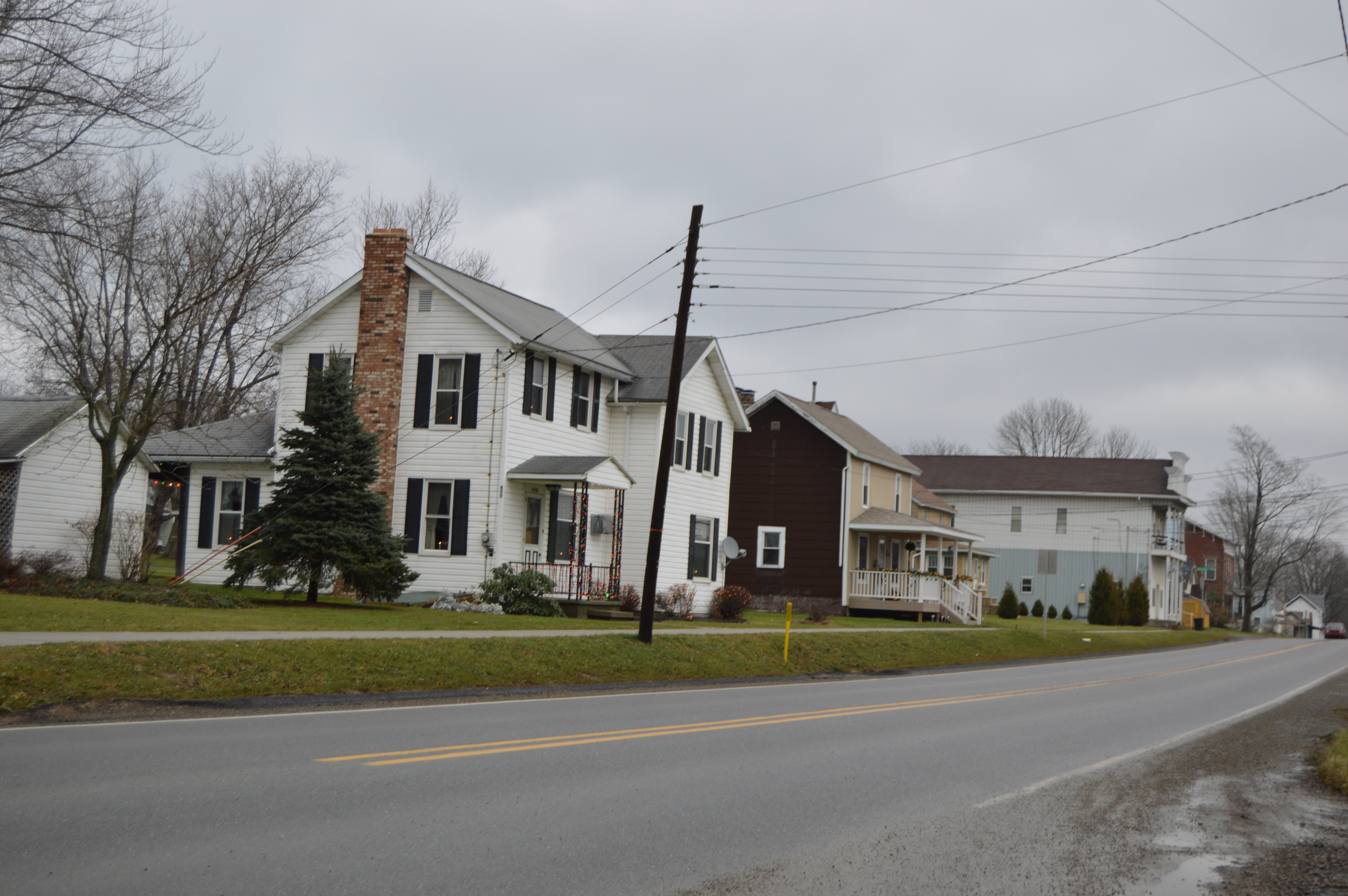
- Houses on Main Street

- Location of Strattanville in Clarion County, Pennsylvania.

- Map showing Clarion County in Pennsylvania

- Location within Pennsylvania
- Coordinates: 41°12′09″N 79°19′44″W
- Country: United States
- State: Pennsylvania
- County: Clarion
- Settled: 1828
- Incorporated: 1850

Government
  - Type: Borough Council

Area
  - Total: 0.50 sq mi (1.30 km^{2})
  - Land: 0.50 sq mi (1.30 km^{2})
  - Water: 0 sq mi (0.00 km^{2})
- Elevation: 1,531 ft (467 m)

Population (2020)
  - Total: 537
  - Estimate (2021): 538
  - Density: 995.4/sq mi (384.34/km^{2})
- Time zone: UTC-5 (Eastern (EST))
  - Summer (DST): UTC-4 (EDT)
- ZIP code: 16258
- FIPS code: 42-74728

Strattanville is a borough in Clarion County, Pennsylvania, United States. The population was 537 at the 2020 census.

== History ==
Originally laid out in 1828 by John Strattan Sr., Strattanville lays claim to be the oldest town in Clarion County. Indeed, the first settlement of the town predates the county by 11 years. In 1850 the village incorporated into a borough. As one of the three original towns of Clarion County, it was once in consideration for the county seat. Due to the political turmoil of the time, it was elected to erect a new, separate municipality to hold the county offices in Clarion, Pennsylvania only three miles away. Strattanville still has many auspices of this age in its history. The old school house now houses the local American Legion. The original store owned by Mr. Strattan still stands at the southeastern corner of Market St. and Main St. However, only the drug and furniture store are easily identifiable of the "four dry goods and grocery stores, a postoffice, one drug store, one hardware store, one foundry, two boot and shoe shops, two millinery establishments, one blacksmith shop, one tannery, one furniture store and undertaking establishment, one barber shop, a Western Union telegraph office, two hotels, one livery stable, and a lumber office" that once populated the borough.

== Geography ==
1877 map of Strattanville

Strattanville is located in eastern Clarion County at 41°12′9″N 79°19′44″W (41.202482, -79.328934). U.S. Route 322 passes through the borough, leading west 3 miles (5 km) to Clarion, the county seat, and east 4.5 miles (7.2 km) to Interstate 80. Exit 64 on I-80 is 3 miles (5 km) southwest of Strattanville via secondary roads.

According to the United States Census Bureau, the borough has a total area of 0.51 square miles (1.31 km^{2}), all land.

== Demographics ==
Historical population
Census	Pop.	Note	%±
1860	323		—
1870	356		10.2%
1880	317		−11.0%
1890	331		4.4%
1900	262		−20.8%
1910	376		43.5%
1920	461		22.6%
1930	487		5.6%
1940	604		24.0%
1950	562		−7.0%
1960	547		−2.7%
1970	559		2.2%
1980	555		−0.7%
1990	490		−11.7%
2000	542		10.6%
2010	550		1.5%
2020	537		−2.4%
2021 (est.)	538	▲	0.2%

As of the census of 2000, there were 542 people, 243 households, and 150 families residing in the borough. The population density was 1,013.6 inhabitants per square mile (391.4/km^{2}). There were 254 housing units at an average density of 475.0 per square mile (183.4/km^{2}). The racial makeup of the borough was 97.79% White, 0.92% African American, 0.37% Asian, and 0.92% from two or more races.

There were 243 households, out of which 29.6% had children under the age of 18 living with them, 43.2% were married couples living together, 12.8% had a female householder with no husband present, and 37.9% were non-families. 29.6% of all households were made up of individuals, and 9.9% had someone living alone who was 65 years of age or older. The average household size was 2.22 and the average family size was 2.73.

In the borough the population was spread out, with 23.2% under the age of 18, 9.6% from 18 to 24, 33.0% from 25 to 44, 19.4% from 45 to 64, and 14.8% who were 65 years of age or older. The median age was 36 years. For every 100 females there were 88.2 males. For every 100 females age 18 and over, there were 81.7 males.

The median income for a household in the borough was $25,833, and the median income for a family was $31,125. Males had a median income of $28,125 versus $18,929 for females. The per capita income for the borough was $14,506. About 11.3% of families and 15.8% of the population were below the poverty line, including 34.8% of those under age 18 and 5.4% of those age 65 or over.
