= Sykesville, Pennsylvania =

Borough in Pennsylvania, US

- Borough
- Location of Sykesville in Jefferson County, Pennsylvania.

- Location within Pennsylvania Location within the United States
- Coordinates: 41°02′58″N 78°49′12″W
- Country: United States
- State: Pennsylvania
- County: Jefferson
- Settled: 1859
- Incorporated: 1907

Government
  - Type: Borough Council

Area
  - Total: 1.59 sq mi (4.12 km^{2})
  - Land: 1.58 sq mi (4.10 km^{2})
  - Water: 0.0077 sq mi (0.02 km^{2})
- Elevation: 1,352 ft (412 m)

Population (2010)
  - Total: 1,115
  - Density: 701.0/sq mi (270.66/km^{2})
- Time zone: UTC-5 (Eastern (EST))
  - Summer (DST): UTC-4 (EDT)
- ZIP code: 15865
- Area code: 814
- FIPS code: 42-75888
- Website: sykesboro.org

Sykesville is a borough in Jefferson County, Pennsylvania, United States. As of the 2020 census, Sykesville had a population of 1,115.

Named for Jacob B. Sykes, an early resident, Sykesville was the birthplace of Olga Madar (1915–1996), the first woman to become a vice-president in the United Auto Workers (1970) and founder of the Coalition of Labor Union Women (1974).

== Geography ==
Sykesville is located in eastern Jefferson County at 41°2′58″N 78°49′12″W (41.049543, -78.820134). Its eastern border is the Clearfield County line. U.S. Route 119 passes through the center of town, leading northeast 6 miles (10 km) to DuBois and southwest 13 miles (21 km) to Punxsutawney.

According to the United States Census Bureau, Sykesville has a total area of 1.6 square miles (4.1 km^{2}), of which 0.01 square miles (0.02 km^{2}), or 0.46%, are water.

The borough is situated in the valley of Stump Creek, a southward-flowing tributary of Mahoning Creek, which flows west to the Allegheny River.

== Demographics ==
Historical population
Census	Pop.	Note	%±
1910	1,756		—
1920	2,507		42.8%
1930	2,103		−16.1%
1940	2,044		−2.8%
1950	1,652		−19.2%
1960	1,479		−10.5%
1970	1,311		−11.4%
1980	1,537		17.2%
1990	1,387		−9.8%
2000	1,246		−10.2%
2010	1,157		−7.1%
2020	1,115		−3.6%

As of the census of 2000, there were 1,246 people, 548 households, and 340 families residing in the borough. The population density was 784.7 inhabitants per square mile (303.0/km^{2}). There were 604 housing units at an average density of 380.4 per square mile (146.9/km^{2}).

The racial makeup of the borough was 99.44% White, 0.24% African American, 0.16% Native American, and 0.16% from two or more races. Hispanic or Latino of any race were 0.24% of the population.

There were 548 households, out of which 29.4% had children under the age of 18 living with them, 47.1% were married couples living together, 10.8% had a female householder with no husband present, and 37.8% were non-families. 33.9% of all households were made up of individuals, and 17.9% had someone living alone who was 65 years of age or older. The average household size was 2.27 and the average family size was 2.92.

In the borough the population was spread out, with 24.2% under the age of 18, 7.1% from 18 to 24, 27.4% from 25 to 44, 20.7% from 45 to 64, and 20.6% who were 65 years of age or older. The median age was 40 years.

For every 100 females there were 94.1 males. For every 100 females age 18 and over, there were 92.9 males.

The median income for a household in the borough was $26,719, and the median income for a family was $34,375. Males had a median income of $30,597 versus $19,773 for females. The per capita income for the borough was $14,398.

Roughly 13.1% of families and 17.1% of the population were below the poverty line, including 23.4% of those under age 18 and 11.0% of those age 65 or over.
