= Clarion, Pennsylvania =

Borough in Pennsylvania, US

- Borough
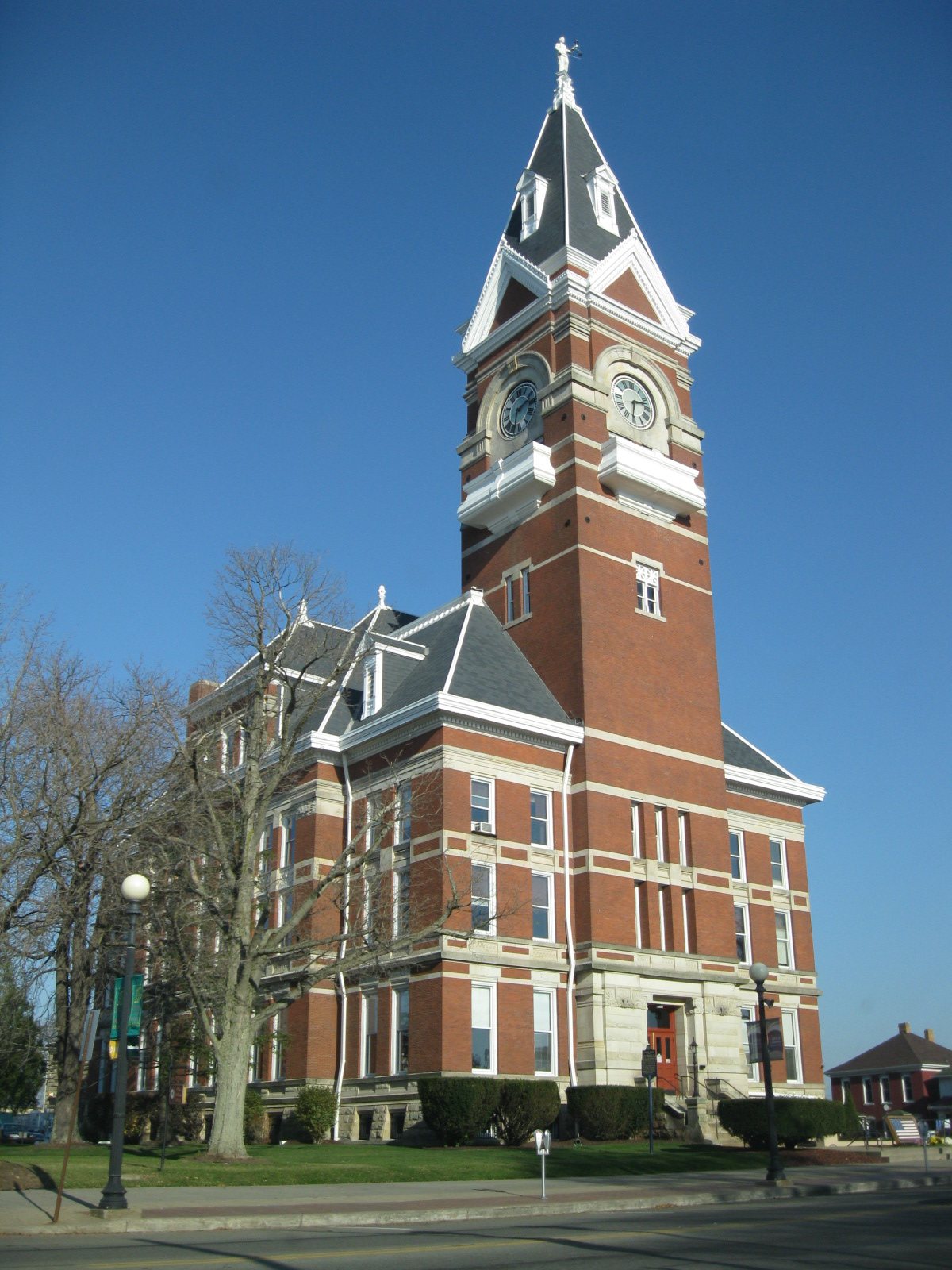
- Clarion County Courthouse and Jail

- Location of Clarion in Clarion County, Pennsylvania

- Location in Pennsylvania Location in the United States
- Coordinates: 41°12′42″N 79°23′02″W
- Country: United States
- State: Pennsylvania
- County: Clarion
- Settled: 1839
- Incorporated: 1841

Government
  - Type: Mayor–council
  - Mayor: Jennifer Fulmer Vinson
  - Council president: Carol Lapinto

Area
  - Total: 1.62 sq mi (4.19 km^{2})
  - Land: 1.58 sq mi (4.08 km^{2})
  - Water: 0.042 sq mi (0.11 km^{2})
- Elevation: 1,491 ft (454 m)

Population (2020)
  - Total: 3,931
  - Density: 2,496.9/sq mi (964.04/km^{2})
- Time zone: UTC-5 (Eastern (EST))
  - Summer (DST): UTC-4 (EDT)
- ZIP code: 16214
- Area code: 814
- FIPS code: 42-13800
- Website: www.clarionboro.org

Clarion is a borough in Clarion County, Pennsylvania, United States, and its county seat. The population was 3,931 at the 2020 census. It is located 77 miles (124 km) north-northeast of Pittsburgh along the Clarion River and is part of the Pittsburgh DMA.

Clarion was settled in 1839 and incorporated in 1841. In the past, the surrounding area produced natural gas, oil, lumber and coal. It is home to the annual Autumn Leaf Festival and PennWest Clarion. The county courthouse was added to the National Register of Historic Places in 1979.

== Geography ==
Clarion is located slightly northeast of the center of Clarion County at 41°12′42″N 79°23′2″W (41.211791, -79.384005), in the Allegheny Plateau region of western Pennsylvania. The main part of the borough sits at an elevation of 1,400 to 1,500 feet (430 to 460 m) above sea level, overlooking the 400-foot-deep (120 m) valley of the Clarion River, a tributary of the Allegheny River.

U.S. Route 322 passes through the borough as Main Street, leading northwest 28 miles (45 km) to Franklin and southeast 16 miles (26 km) to Brookville. Pennsylvania Route 68 (Fifth Avenue) leads south from the center of Clarion, 2 miles (3 km) to Exit 62 of Interstate 80 and 11 miles (18 km) to Sligo.

According to the United States Census Bureau, the borough has a total area of 1.62 square miles (4.19 km^{2}), of which 1.58 square miles (4.08 km^{2}) is land and 0.04 square miles (0.11 km^{2}), or 2.70%, is water.

=== Climate ===
Clarion has a humid continental climate (Köppen Dfb), with warm summers and cold to very cold, snowy winters. Precipitation is highest in the summer months, with an annual average of 46.55 in (1,182 mm). Snow usually falls between October and April.

Climate data for Clarion, Pennsylvania (3mi SW) (1991–2020 normals, extremes 1943–present)
Month	Jan	Feb	Mar	Apr	May	Jun	Jul	Aug	Sep	Oct	Nov	Dec	Year
Record high °F (°C)	72 (22)	73 (23)	84 (29)	92 (33)	97 (36)	101 (38)	101 (38)	104 (40)	97 (36)	87 (31)	80 (27)	70 (21)	104 (40)
Mean daily maximum °F (°C)	33.3 (0.7)	36.2 (2.3)	46.1 (7.8)	60.3 (15.7)	71.1 (21.7)	78.7 (25.9)	82.2 (27.9)	80.7 (27.1)	74.0 (23.3)	62.0 (16.7)	48.9 (9.4)	37.7 (3.2)	59.3 (15.2)
Daily mean °F (°C)	24.4 (−4.2)	26.0 (−3.3)	34.4 (1.3)	46.4 (8.0)	57.3 (14.1)	65.6 (18.7)	69.6 (20.9)	68.4 (20.2)	61.7 (16.5)	50.0 (10.0)	38.9 (3.8)	30.0 (−1.1)	47.7 (8.7)
Mean daily minimum °F (°C)	15.5 (−9.2)	15.7 (−9.1)	22.6 (−5.2)	32.5 (0.3)	43.6 (6.4)	52.6 (11.4)	57.0 (13.9)	56.2 (13.4)	49.5 (9.7)	37.9 (3.3)	28.9 (−1.7)	22.3 (−5.4)	36.2 (2.3)
Record low °F (°C)	−25 (−32)	−26 (−32)	−16 (−27)	5 (−15)	17 (−8)	25 (−4)	36 (2)	31 (−1)	25 (−4)	11 (−12)	−1 (−18)	−23 (−31)	−26 (−32)
Average precipitation inches (mm)	3.64 (92)	2.71 (69)	3.50 (89)	4.05 (103)	3.86 (98)	4.66 (118)	5.31 (135)	4.22 (107)	4.00 (102)	3.64 (92)	3.56 (90)	3.73 (95)	46.88 (1,191)
Average precipitation days (≥ 0.01 in)	19.0	15.4	14.7	15.3	14.1	13.6	11.8	11.3	11.6	13.8	14.4	17.2	172.2
Source: NOAA

== Demographics ==
Historical population
Census	Pop.	Note	%±
1850	719		—
1860	648		−9.9%
1870	709		9.4%
1880	1,169		64.9%
1890	2,164		85.1%
1900	2,004		−7.4%
1910	2,612		30.3%
1920	2,793		6.9%
1930	3,201		14.6%
1940	3,798		18.7%
1950	4,409		16.1%
1960	4,958		12.5%
1970	6,095		22.9%
1980	6,198		1.7%
1990	6,457		4.2%
2000	6,185		−4.2%
2010	5,276		−14.7%
2020	3,931		−25.5%
2021 (est.)	3,880	▼	−1.3%

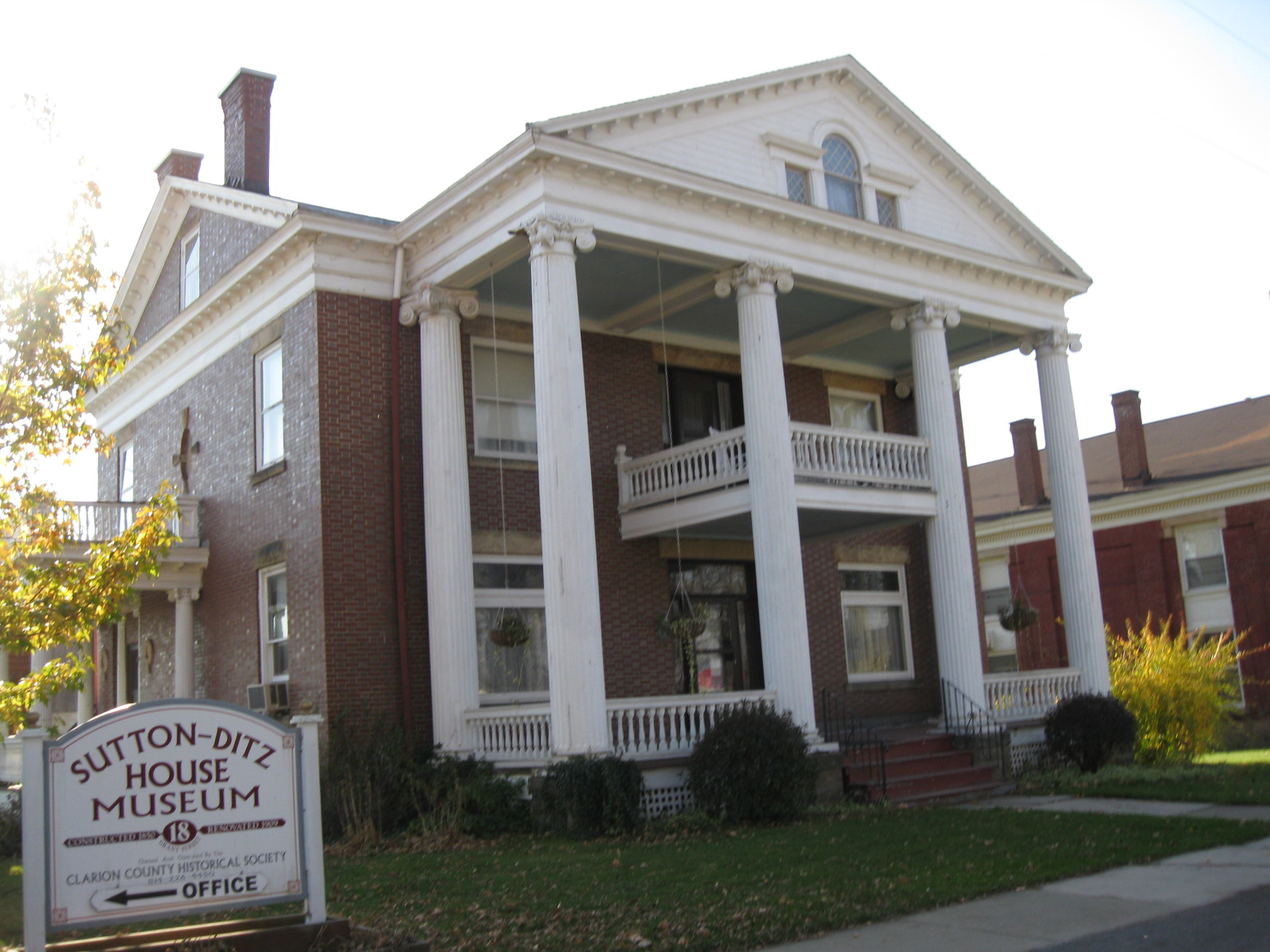
The Sutton-Ditz House Museum in Clarion

=== 2020 census ===
As of the 2020 census, Clarion had a population of 3,931. The median age was 27.7 years. 14.2% of residents were under the age of 18 and 15.2% of residents were 65 years of age or older. For every 100 females there were 81.4 males, and for every 100 females age 18 and over there were 77.2 males age 18 and over.

99.7% of residents lived in urban areas, while 0.3% lived in rural areas.

There were 1,567 households in Clarion, of which 19.5% had children under the age of 18 living in them. Of all households, 28.9% were married-couple households, 24.3% were households with a male householder and no spouse or partner present, and 37.8% were households with a female householder and no spouse or partner present. About 44.2% of all households were made up of individuals and 16.1% had someone living alone who was 65 years of age or older.

There were 2,034 housing units, of which 23.0% were vacant. The homeowner vacancy rate was 7.3% and the rental vacancy rate was 20.8%.

Racial composition as of the 2020 census
Race	Number	Percent
White	3,391	86.3%
Black or African American	201	5.1%
American Indian and Alaska Native	15	0.4%
Asian	84	2.1%
Native Hawaiian and Other Pacific Islander	2	0.1%
Some other race	43	1.1%
Two or more races	195	5.0%
Hispanic or Latino (of any race)	115	2.9%

=== 2000 census ===
As of the 2000 census, there were 6,185 people, 2,000 households, and 718 families residing in the borough. The population density was 4,142.8 inhabitants per square mile (1,599.5/km^{2}). There were 2,192 housing units at an average density of 1,468.2 per square mile (566.9/km^{2}). The racial makeup of the borough was 94.55% White, 3.48% African American, 0.08% Native American, 0.99% Asian, 0.15% from other races, and 0.76% from two or more races. Hispanic or Latino of any race were 0.82% of the population.

There were 2,000 households, out of which 15.0% had children under the age of 18 living with them, 25.3% were married couples living together, 8.6% had a female householder with no husband present, and 64.1% were non-families. 38.6% of all households were made up of individuals, and 11.7% had someone living alone who was 65 years of age or older. The average household size was 2.17 and the average family size was 2.75. versus $20,214 for females. The per capita income for the borough was $10,832. About 18.8% of families and 41.2% of the population were below the poverty line, including 27.1% of those under age 18 and 7.2% of those age 65 or over.

== Education ==
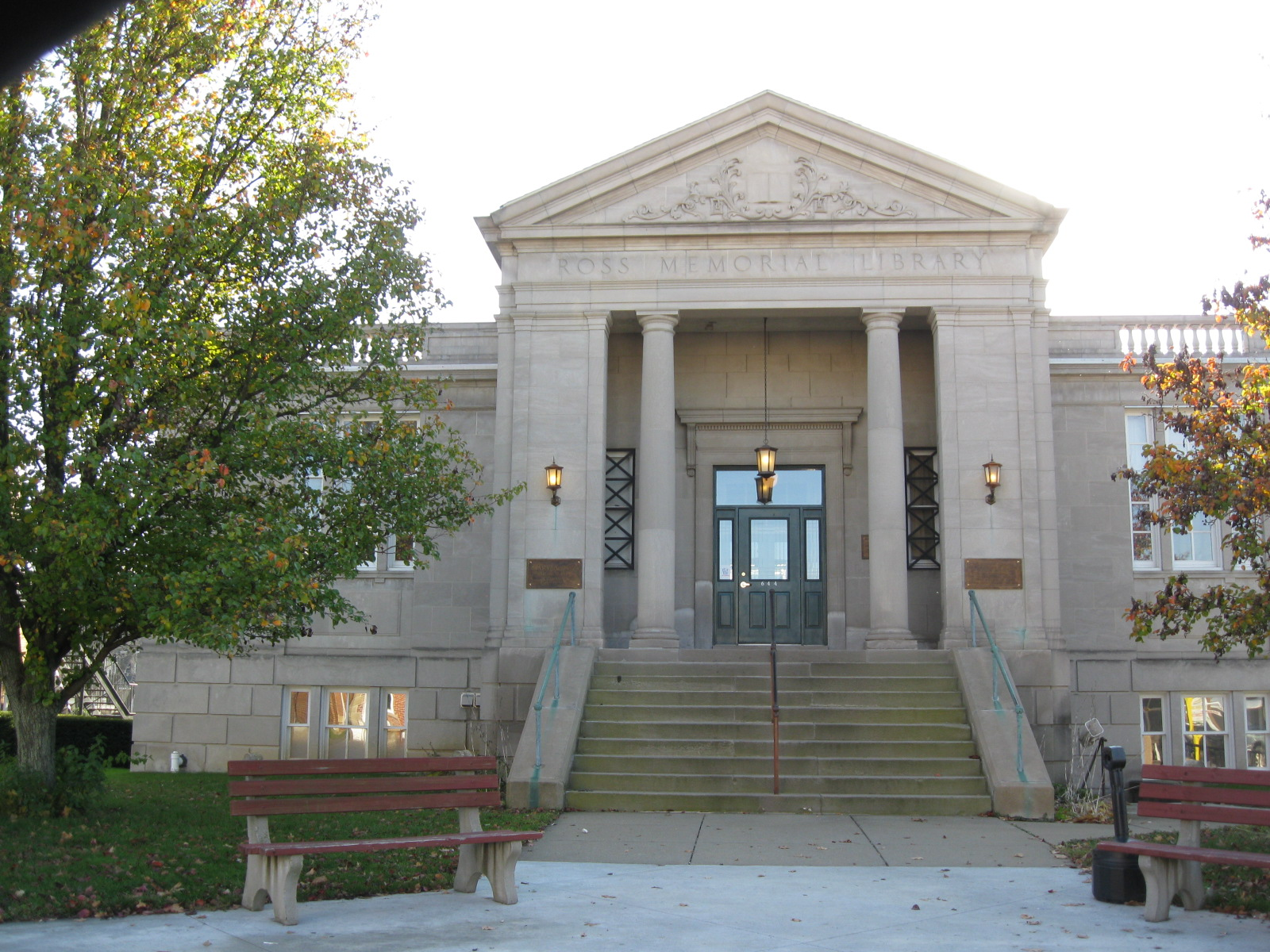
Ross Memorial Library in downtown Clarion

PennWest Clarion, formerly Clarion University of Pennsylvania, is located in the borough. It is a campus of Pennsylvania Western University founded in 1867.

== Notable people ==
- Kurt Angle, Olympic gold medalist
- Clara Rankin Coblentz, social reformer
- Emmet Heidrick, baseball player
- Chris Kirkpatrick, NSYNC singer
- Ernest M. Skinner, pipe organ builder
- Frankie Edgar, wrestler and mixed martial artist
