= Bilger's Rocks =

Park in Pennsylvania, United States

Coordinates: 40°59′36″N 78°35′35″W

Bilger's Rocks is a park in Clearfield County, Pennsylvania, USA, near the town of Grampian in Bloom Township. The surrounding area is intricately laced with hills, mountains, and river valleys that generally follow the Appalachian mountain range in a northwest to southeast direction. The area of the park is located along the Allegheny section of the mountains, approximately 8 miles (13 km) southwest of the highest point on Interstate 80 east of the Mississippi River.

== Formation ==
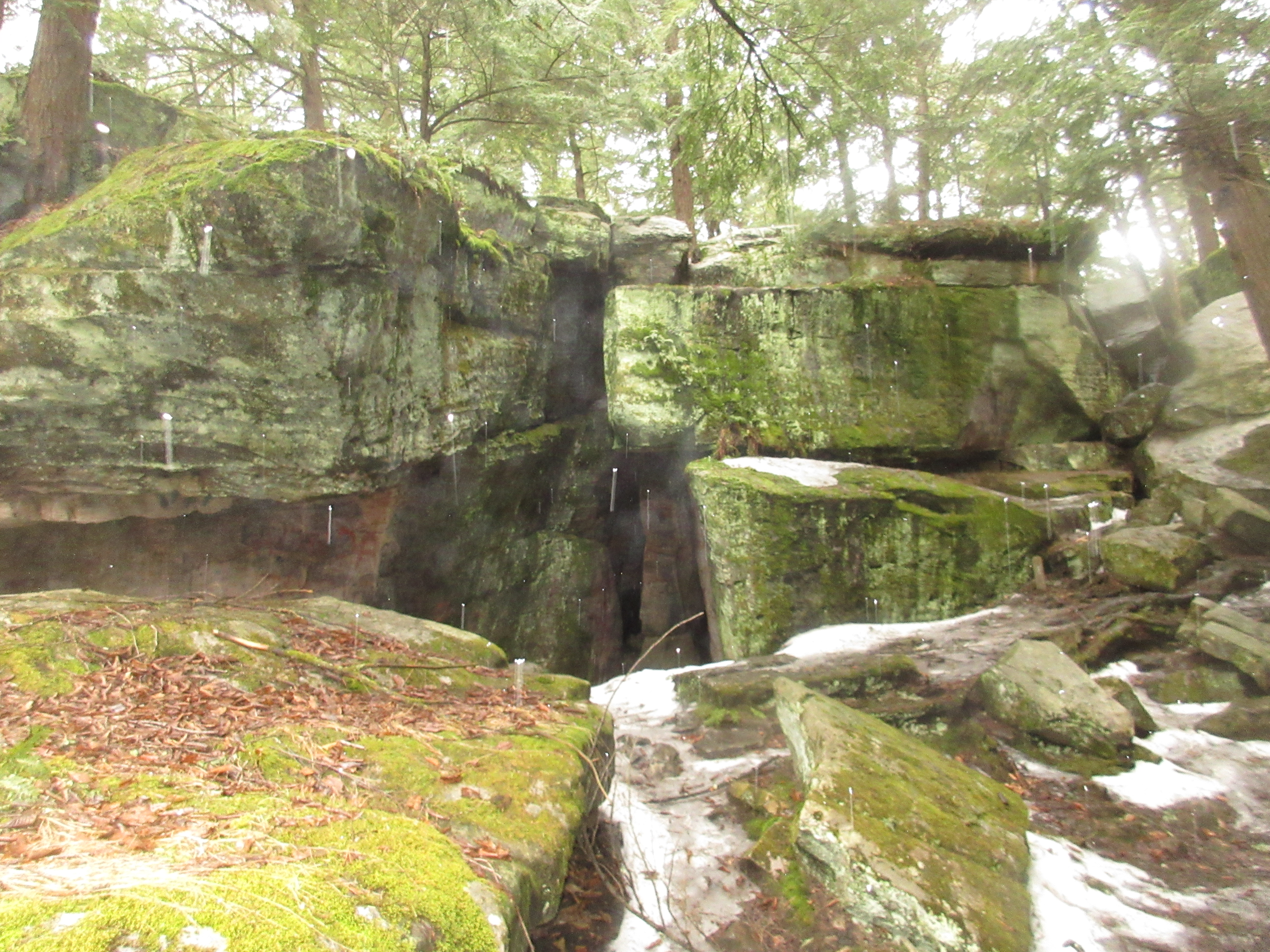
Winter afternoon at Bilger's Rocks

The creation of the sandstone seen exposed at Bilger's Rocks was during the Carboniferous Period that lasted from 354 to 290 million years ago. The rocks exposed at Bilger's Rocks are the Homewood Formation of the Pottsville Group, dominantly sandstone of Pennsylvanian age. These rocks were once covered by softer rocks (i.e. limestone & shale) that have been eroded away. In the vicinity of Bilger's Rocks the remaining sandstone bed measures over 50 feet (15 m) thick and is broken up over hundreds of yards. The Homewood sandstone has an age range of approximately 316-320 million years old, predating the breakup of the ancient "supercontinent" known as Pangaea. The mountains and prominent cliffs along the Susquehanna River, from below Lumber City to below Curwensville, as well as up Anderson Creek and Hughey Run are part of the same massive mountain ranges that were formed when two separate continents collided during Pangea's formation. Below Bells Landing, outcrops of the Homewood strata can be seen throughout the valley of the West Branch of the Susquehanna River. The West Branch was known to Native Americans as Otsinachsin, "The Place By The Rocks."

The most striking feature about Bilger's Rocks are the various openings, crawlspaces, passageways, and arches found throughout the outcrop. These minute fissures and larger gaps are primarily caused by jointing within the rocks. Joints are caused by tectonic, or mountain-building forces that move and stress rocks, causing them to fracture. The resulting cracks provide an inlet for water, which slowly dissolves the rocks and allows space for ice crystals to freeze and thaw during the seasonal cycles, further pushing the rocks apart. Eventually, plants and trees also grow up through crevasses in the rocks and can exert considerable pressure as they grow, forcing even larger gaps to form. Gravity and erosion work together to slowly level the landscape by breaking the rock into ever smaller pieces and transporting it away. The steady continental movement combined with relentless erosion and weathering over hundreds of millions of years has left the continually evolving "Rock City" that we can observe today.

== Usage by Native Americans, explorers, and European settlers ==
Near Bilger's Rocks on the site of what is presently the town of Clearfield was originally a Native American settlement called Chinklacamoose (alternately spelled Chincleclamoose, or using the Native pronunciation "Chincleclamousche"), surrounded by mountains, including those which are now called Grampian Hills, but still accessible via the Susquehanna River's West Branch, Upper Anderson Creek, Clearfield Creek, and Bilger's Run. The area was known to have many natural resources that provided Native Americans and the others that came later with a myriad of wildlife and goods to hunt, produce, and trade. The surrounding watershed flows generally south and east to its ultimate destination: the Chesapeake Bay.

Chinklacamoose was a popular trading post on the ancient trail that roughly follows what is now the Old Erie Pike and US Route 322, from Philipsburg and the East Coast, through Curwensville, and on to Punxsutawney and Luthersburg. The eastern trails converged with the southern trails out of Maryland and headed northwest ultimately to New York, Lake Erie, and Canada, and south-west to the convergence of the Ohio, Monongahela, and Allegheny Rivers where Fort Duquesne was eventually erected on the site of the future city of Pittsburgh.

Eventually, the native population was pushed further west and the treaties signed at Fort Stanwix in 1784 and Fort McIntosh in 1785 expanded the land rush. Five families from Maryland and Chester and Delaware counties arrived each holding title to 1,000 acres (4.0 km^{2}) for which they had paid a land speculator $5 an acre. It was not uncommon for future land speculators to divide the tracts into smaller parcels for sale with very easy payments of only five or ten dollars down, contributing to the growing numbers of settlers.

The area encompassing Bilger's Rocks that eventually was to become Bloom Township was petitioned to the U.S. Quarter Sessions Court in August 1857 by residents of surrounding Pike, Penn, Brady, and Union Townships. A vote was taken in November of that year that unanimously agreed to create the new township, and was named and enacted in January 1860. The whole of this land was originally incorporated as Pike township in 1813, and prior to that was part of the original Chinklacamoose territory. Due to the relative remoteness of the hilly, mountainous area and the dense forest that surrounded it, over 20 years passed from the township's original incorporation to the settler's habitation of what was then considered by settlers to be a desolate, uninviting area. The recorded population according to the census of 1910 was 451.

== Underground Railroad ==
The various paths, river routes, and safe waypoints that escaped slaves and their guides used in their journey northwards towards freedom are collectively known as the "Underground Railroad." In western Pennsylvania, routes began at the Maryland-Pennsylvania border and travelled through Bedford, where the route split into various subroutes around Altoona, Johnstown, and Philipsburg that ultimately converged again in and around Clearfield and Grampian Hills. From there, the route redirected in a north-west direction, following the valleys and mountain passes that protected a well-worn Native American trail that leads to New York, Lake Erie, and on to Canada.

A large proportion of the local population at the time consisted of Pennsylvania Quakers. The religious group had abolished slavery within the Society of Friends in 1776 and were petitioning the state and federal governments to do the same. The Gradual Abolition Act was passed by the Pennsylvania Assembly in 1780 and the state became a known destination by slaves throughout the country looking for safe harbor. The Quaker settlers that lived in the area did what they could to assist escaped slaves travelling through on their way towards the racial tolerance of Canada. The natural topography and terrain of the Allegheny Mountains provided excellent cover and access to the zigzagging, sometimes backtracking, and myriad alternative routes that were needed to ensure the secrecy of the "Railroad."

Some African-Americans themselves lived freely among the Quakers and also acted as "stationmasters" and "conductors" including Issac Cochran and George Hartshorn. They helped shelter and guide runaways through Grampian Hills and Clearfield and on to Brookville, Shippenville, and Franklin in their journey north.

== Preservation Efforts ==
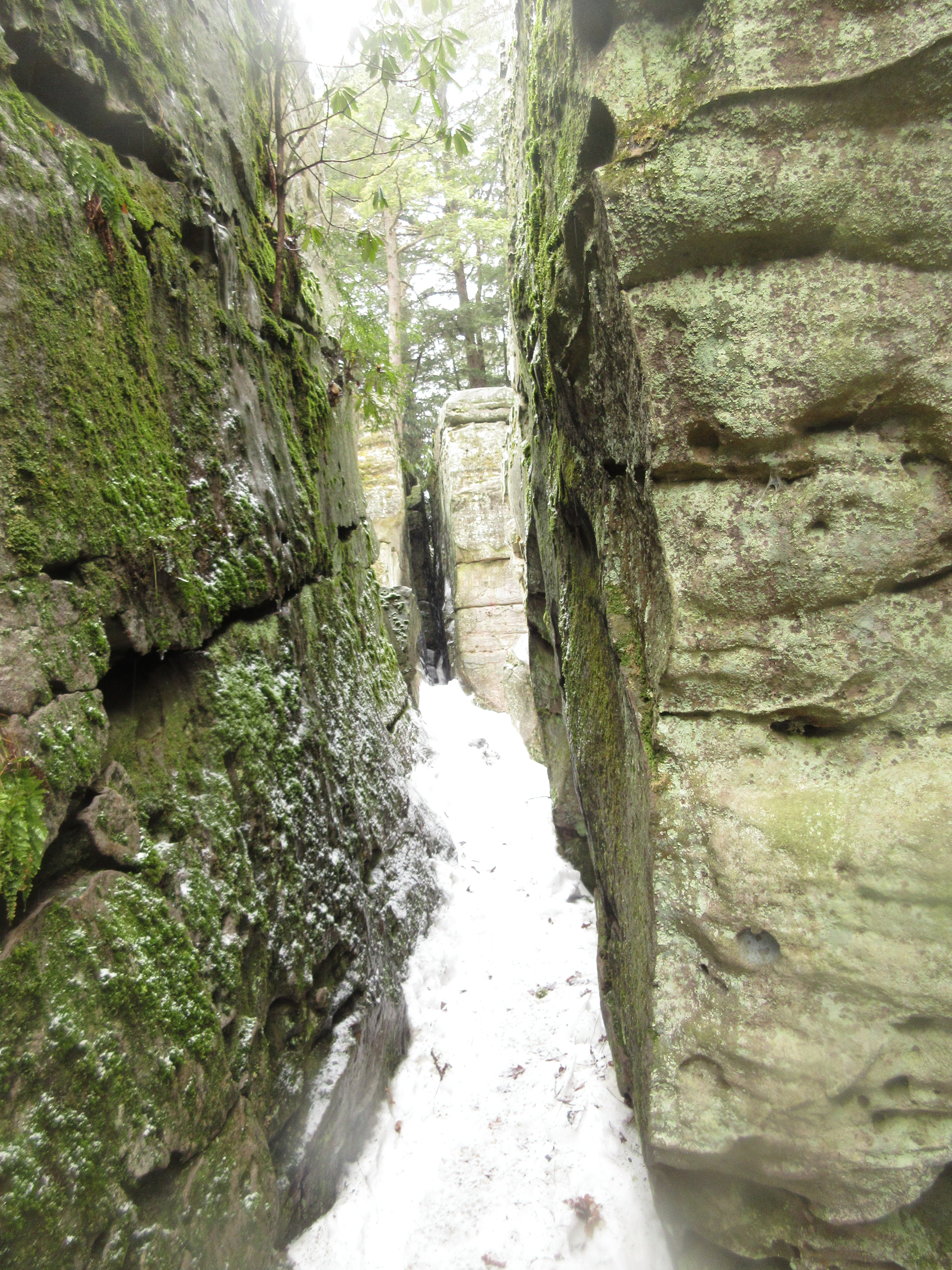
Narrow passage between outcroppings

In the effort to preserve the Bilger's Rocks and the surrounding landscape from increasing developmental pressures and energy exploration, a unified Greenway Design Concept and initiative has been pursued. The "Greenway Systems Components" draft proposal of the Susquehanna Greenway Partnership reads in part:

"The Susquehanna Greenway is a place and a journey that connects people and communities to the Susquehanna River and to its enduring story. The Greenway unveils the spirit of the River- renewing awareness of its distinctive scenery, its natural and cultural heritage. It is a destination shaped by diverse people and the pursuit of their dreams.

The Susquehanna Greenway balances the needs of generations today and tomorrow; conserves the environment for all living things; and creates healthy and successful communities, wide-ranging recreation, and economic prosperity. The Greenway celebrates the Susquehanna River as a place of timeless value, shared memories and experiences- a place to use and enjoy, and to treasure always."
