= Fenton Run =

Stream in Pennsylvania, USA

Fenton Run Tributary to Bilger Run
- Location of Fenton Run mouth Fenton Run (the United States)

Location
- Country: United States
- State: Pennsylvania
- County: Clearfield

Physical characteristics
- Source: Bell Run divide
  - location: about 0.5 miles north-northwest of Grampian, Pennsylvania
  - coordinates: 40°59′27″N 078°37′24″W
  - elevation: 1,690 ft (520 m)
- Mouth
  - location: about 0.75 miles west of Stronach, Pennsylvania
  - coordinates: 40°58′38″N 078°35′12″W
  - elevation: 1,444 ft (440 m)
- Length: 2.14 mi (3.44 km)
- Basin size: 1.83 square miles (4.7 km^{2})
- Discharge
  - location: Bilger Run
  - average: 2.98 cu ft/s (0.084 m^{3}/s) at mouth with Bilger Run

Basin features
- Progression: Bilger Run → Kratzer Run → Anderson Creek → West Branch Susquehanna River → Susquehanna River → Chesapeake Bay → Atlantic Ocean
- River system: Susquehanna River
- Tributaries
  - left: unnamed tributaries
  - right: unnamed tributaries
- Bridges: Joc Lane, 6th Street Ext.

Fenton Run is a 2.14 mi (3.44 km) long 1st order tributary to Bilger Run in Clearfield County, Pennsylvania. It is the only stream with this name in the United States.

Like all of the other tributaries flowing into Kratzer Run, Fenton Run has been impacted by acid mine drainage (AMD). Over the past thirty years, however, stream conditions have improved, and Fenton Run now supports fish life.

== Course ==
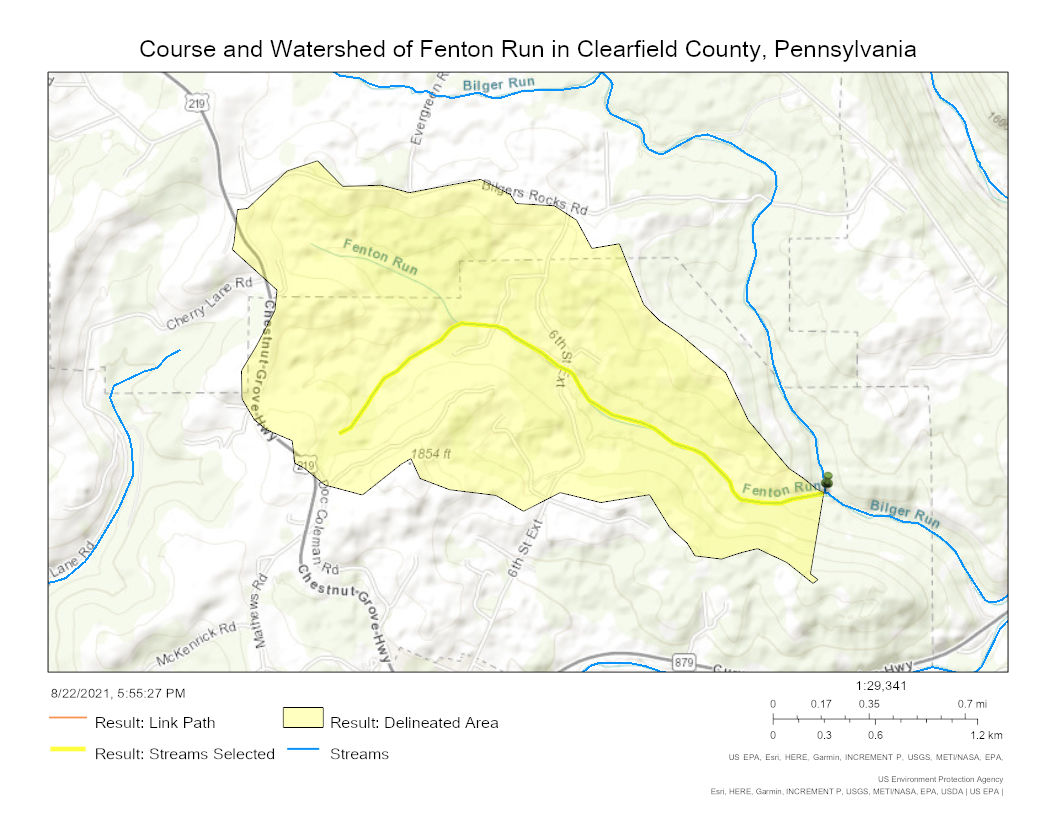
Course and Watershed of Fenton Run in Clearfield County, Pennsylvania, USA

Fenton Run rises about 0.5 miles north-northwest of Grampian, Pennsylvania, and then flows northeast and turns southeast to join Bilger Run about 0.75 miles west of Stronach.

== Watershed ==
Fenton Run drains 1.83 square miles (4.7 km^{2}) of area, receives about 43.6 in/year of precipitation, has a wetness index of 381.35, and is about 65% forested.

== See also ==
- List of Pennsylvania Rivers
