= Bilger Run =

Stream in Pennsylvania, USA

Bilger Run Tributary to Kratzer Run
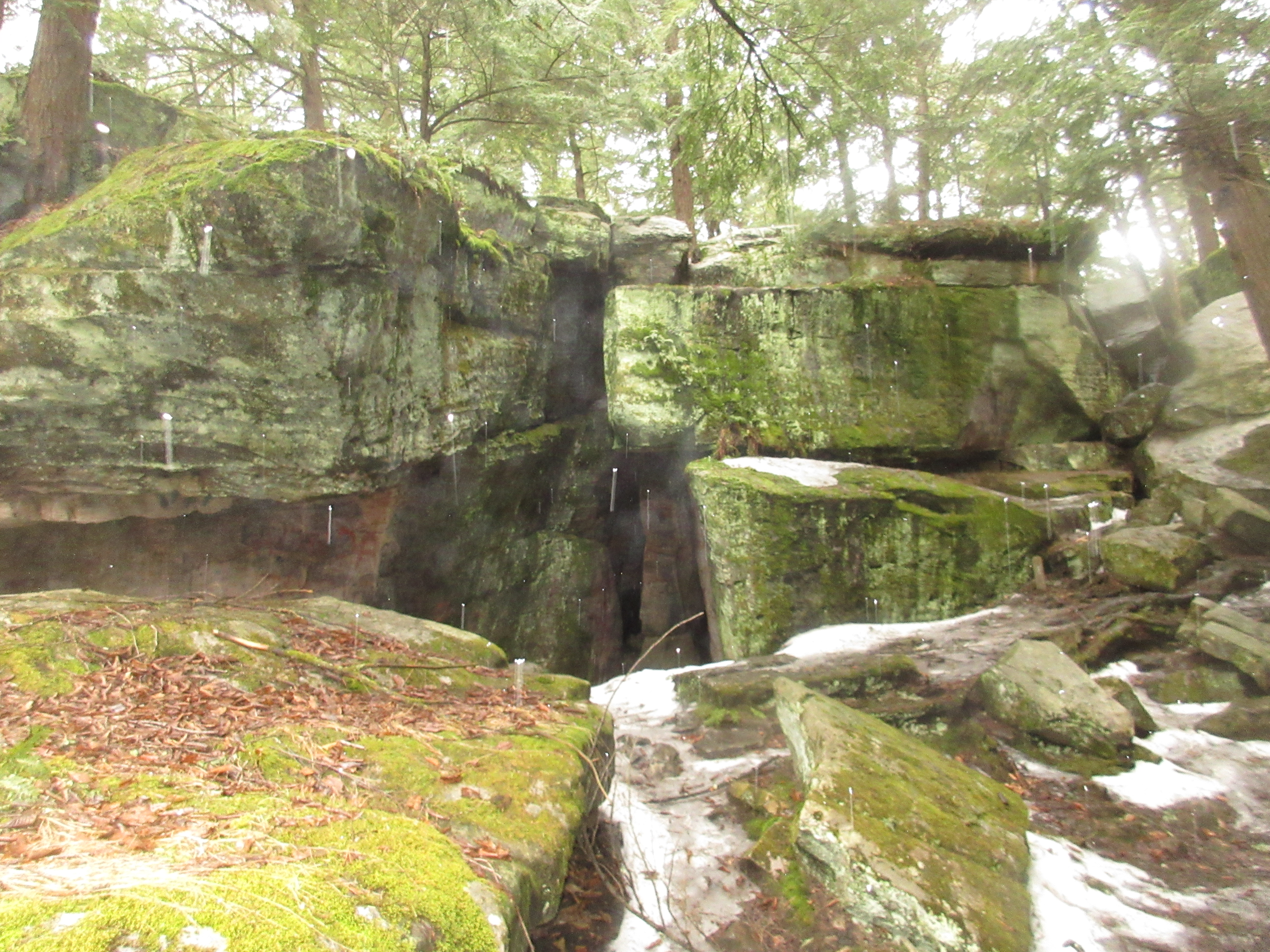
- Bilger's Rocks

- Location of Bilger Run mouth Bilger Run (the United States)

Location
- Country: United States
- State: Pennsylvania
- County: Clearfield

Physical characteristics
- Source: Bell Run divide
  - location: about 2 miles southeast of Chestnut Grove, Pennsylvania
  - coordinates: 41°00′15″N 078°38′01″W
  - elevation: 1,710 ft (520 m)
- Mouth
  - location: about 0.25 miles northeast of Stronach, Pennsylvania
  - coordinates: 40°58′20″N 078°34′11″W
  - elevation: 1,309 ft (399 m)
- Length: 5.05 mi (8.13 km)
- Basin size: 7.22 square miles (18.7 km^{2})
- Discharge
  - location: Kratzer Run
  - average: 7.22 cu ft/s (0.204 m^{3}/s) at mouth with Kratzer Run

Basin features
- Progression: Kratzer Run → Anderson Creek → West Branch Susquehanna River → Susquehanna River → Chesapeake Bay → Atlantic Ocean
- River system: Susquehanna River
- Tributaries
  - left: Hughey Run
  - right: Fenton Run
- Bridges: Evergreen Road, Bilgers Rocks Road, PA 879

Bilger Run is a 5.05 mi (8.13 km) long 2nd order tributary to Kratzer Run in Clearfield County, Pennsylvania and Kratzer Run's largest and only named tributary. Its watershed accounts for nearly half of the greater Kratzer Run watershed. This is the only stream of this name in the United States. Bilger Run has an ID number of 1169617 from the US Board of Geographic Names.

== Course ==
Bilger Run rises about 2 miles southeast of Chestnut Grove, Pennsylvania, in an area of wetlands and then flows generally southeast to join Kratzer Run at Stronach. It runs through areas that have been surfaced mined for coal in its upper reaches.

== Watershed ==
Bilger Run drains 7.22 square miles (18.7 km^{2}) of area, receives about 43.9 in/year of precipitation, has a wetness index of 407.40, and is about 68% forested. Bilger Run is heavily loaded with metals from Acid Mine Drainage (AMD) and contributes a lot to the pollution load of Kratzer Run and then on into Anderson Creek. No fish were found at the sampling station on Bilger Run.

== Natural history ==
Bilger Run drains parts of the Anderson Creek Montgomery Creek LCA and is also the location of Bilger Rocks BDA. The LCA is noted for providing contiguous forested habitat for interior forest species, while the BDA provides habitat for a species of rare plant.

== See also ==
- List of Pennsylvania Rivers

== Watershed Maps ==
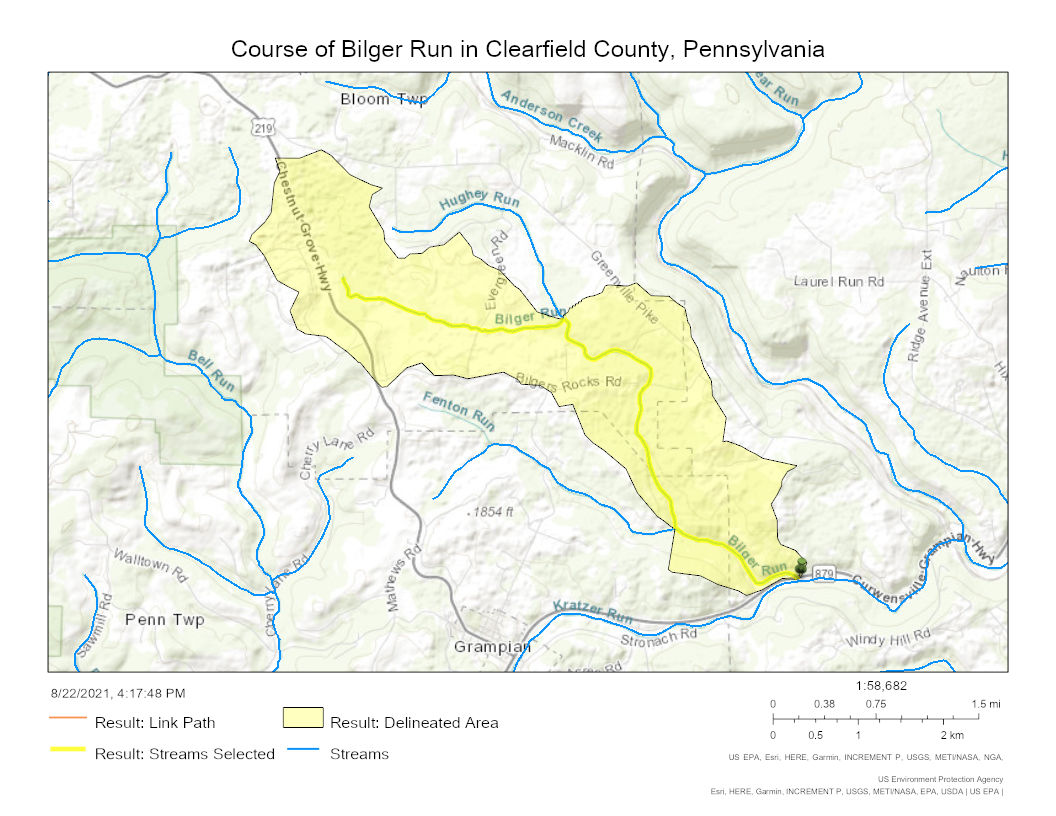
Course of Bilger Run in Clearfield County, Pennsylvania, USA

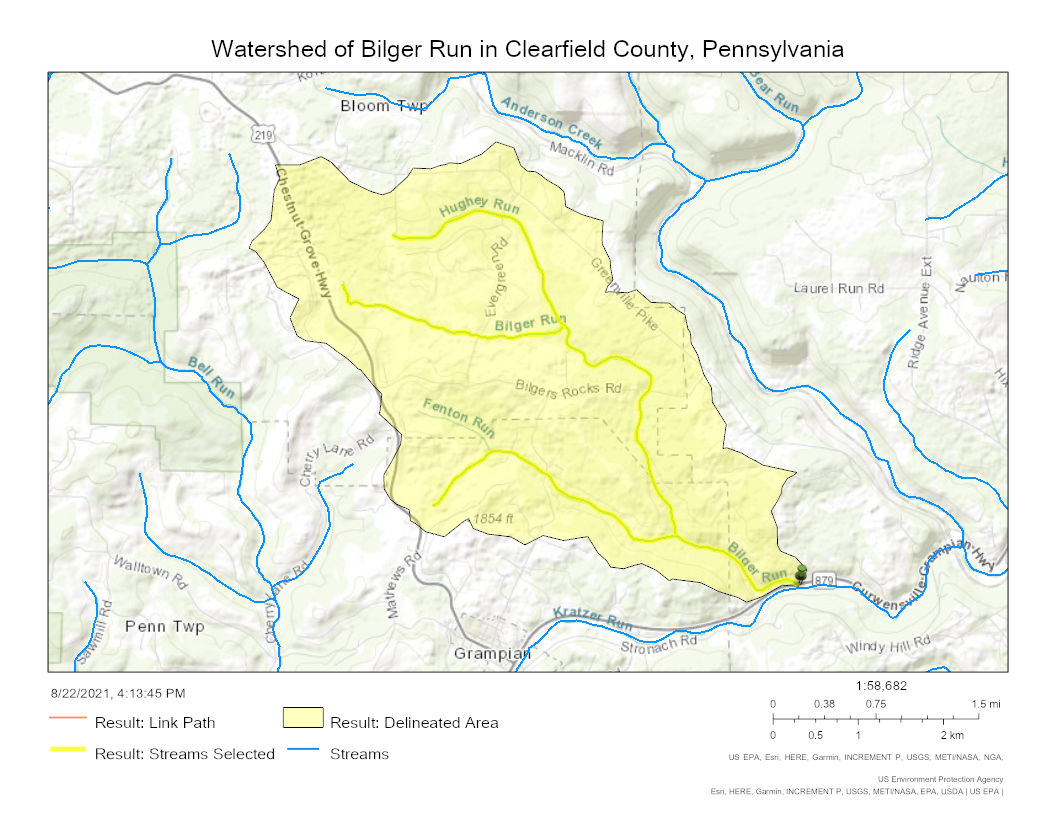
Watershed of Bilger Run in Clearfield County, Pennsylvania, USA
