= Whitney Run (Stony Run tributary) =

Stream in Pennsylvania, USA

Whitney Run Tributary to Stony Run
- Location of Whitney Run mouth Whitney Run (Stony Run tributary) (the United States)

Location
- Country: United States
- State: Pennsylvania
- County: Clearfield

Physical characteristics
- Source: Anderson Creek divide
  - location: about 1 mile south of Anderson Creek, Pennsylvania
  - coordinates: 41°07′59″N 078°32′49″W
  - elevation: 1,990 ft (610 m)
- Mouth
  - location: about 2 miles northeast of Home Camp, Pennsylvania
  - coordinates: 41°07′39″N 078°35′55″W
  - elevation: 1,699 ft (518 m)
- Length: 3.15 mi (5.07 km)
- Basin size: 1.96 square miles (5.1 km^{2})
- Discharge
  - location: Stony Run
  - average: 3.52 cu ft/s (0.100 m^{3}/s) at mouth with Stony Run

Basin features
- Progression: Stony Run → Anderson Creek → West Branch Susquehanna River → Susquehanna River → Chesapeake Bay → Atlantic Ocean
- River system: Susquehanna River
- Tributaries
  - left: unnamed tributaries
  - right: unnamed tributaries
- Bridges: Gordon Road

Whitney Run is a 3.15 mi (5.07 km) long 1st order tributary to Stony Run in Clearfield County, Pennsylvania.

== Course ==
Whitney Run rises about 1 mile south of Anderson Creek, Pennsylvania, and then flows generally west to join Stony Run about 2 miles northeast of Home Camp.

== Watershed ==
Whitney Run drains 1.96 square miles (5.1 km^{2}) of area, receives about 45.1 in/year of precipitation, has a wetness index of 440.18, and is about 90% forested.

== See also ==
- List of Pennsylvania Rivers

== Watershed Maps ==
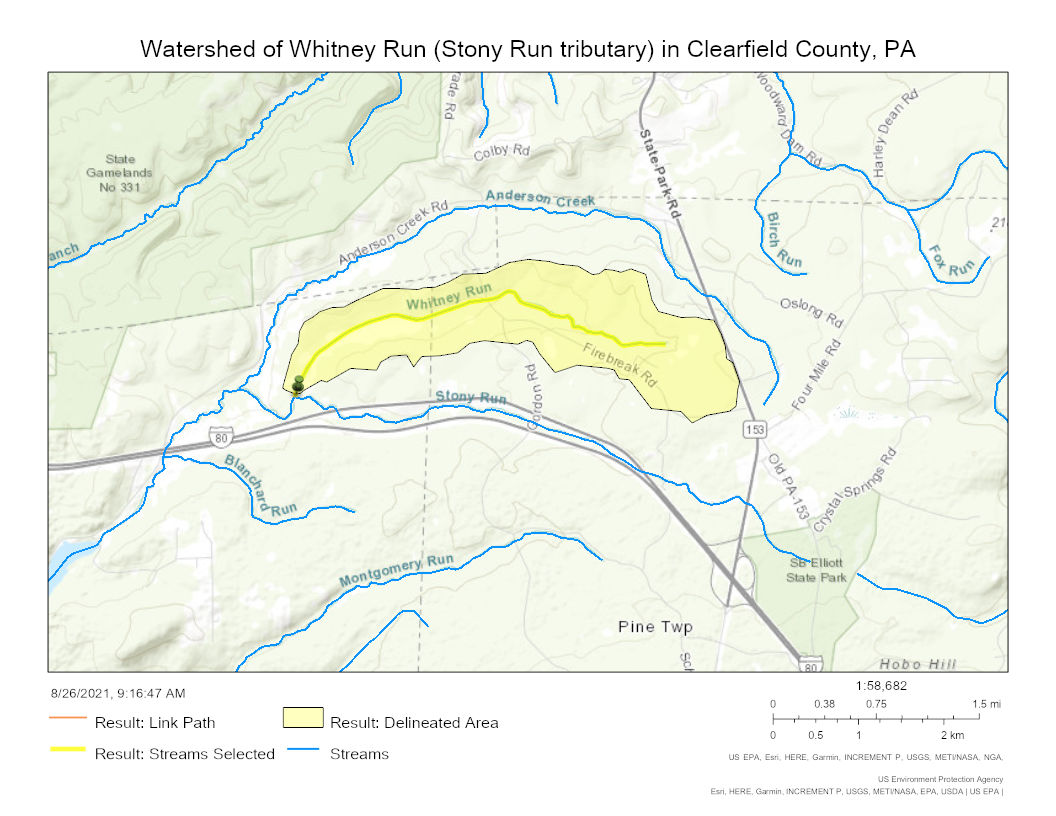
Course and Watershed of Whitney Run (Stony Run tributary) in Clearfield County, Pennsylvania, USA
