= Hughey Run =

Stream in Pennsylvania, US

Hughey Run Tributary to Bilger Run
- Location of Hughey Run mouth Hughey Run (the United States)

Location
- Country: United States
- State: Pennsylvania
- County: Clearfield

Physical characteristics
- Source: Bilger Run divide
  - location: pond about 1 mile west of Greenville, Pennsylvania
  - coordinates: 41°00′36″N 078°37′43″W
  - elevation: 1,790 ft (550 m)
- Mouth
  - location: about 0.5 miles south of Greenville, Pennsylvania
  - coordinates: 40°59′59″N 078°36′09″W
  - elevation: 1,686 ft (514 m)
- Length: 1.84 mi (2.96 km)
- Basin size: 1.26 square miles (3.3 km^{2})
- Discharge
  - location: Bilger Run
  - average: 2.14 cu ft/s (0.061 m^{3}/s) at mouth with Bilger Run

Basin features
- Progression: Bilger Run → Kratzer Run → Anderson Creek → West Branch Susquehanna River → Susquehanna River → Chesapeake Bay → Atlantic Ocean
- River system: Susquehanna River
- Tributaries
  - left: unnamed tributaries
  - right: unnamed tributaries
- Bridges: T 486, Evergreen Road

Hughey Run is a 1.84 mi (2.96 km) long 1st order tributary to Bilger Run in Clearfield County, Pennsylvania. This is the only stream of this name in the United States. Hughey Run has been and continues to impacted by acid mine drainage (AMD), though not to the extent of Kratzer Run.

== Course ==
Hughey Run rises in a pond about 1 mile west of Greenville, Pennsylvania, and then flows generally southeast to join Bilger Run about 0.5 miles south of Greenville.

== Watershed ==
Hughey Run drains 1.26 square miles (3.3 km^{2}) of area, receives about 44.6 in/year of precipitation, has a wetness index of 427.37, and is about 73% forested.

== See also ==
- List of Pennsylvania Rivers

== Watershed Map ==
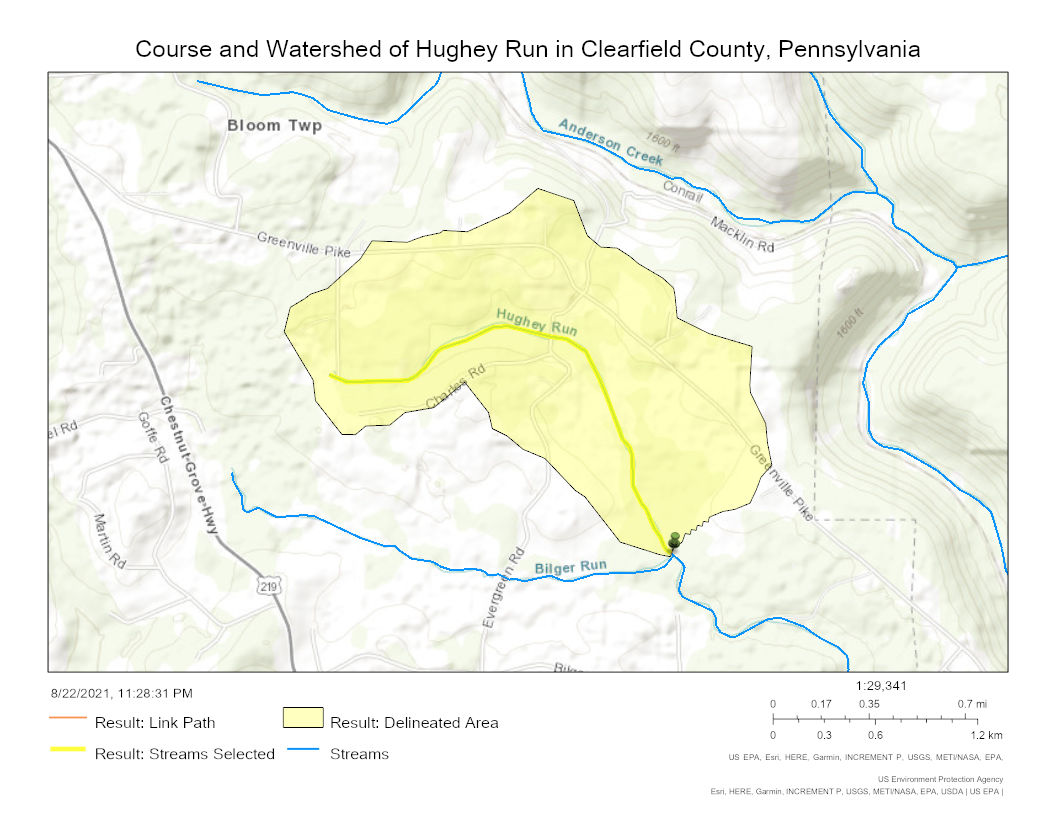
Course and Watershed of Hughey Run in Clearfield County, Pennsylvania, USA
