= Dressler Run =

Stream in Pennsylvania, USA

Dressler Run Tributary to Anderson Creek
- Location of Dressler Run mouth Dressler Run (the United States)

Location
- Country: United States
- State: Pennsylvania
- County: Clearfield

Physical characteristics
- Source: Coal Run divide
  - location: about 0.25 miles northwest of Home Camp, Pennsylvania
  - coordinates: 41°07′03″N 078°38′56″W
  - elevation: 1,710 ft (520 m)
- Mouth
  - location: Home Camp, Pennsylvania
  - coordinates: 41°06′29″N 078°38′45″W
  - elevation: 1,675 ft (511 m)
- Length: 1.45 mi (2.33 km)
- Basin size: 1.20 square miles (3.1 km^{2})
- Discharge
  - location: Anderson Creek
  - average: 2.06 cu ft/s (0.058 m^{3}/s) at mouth with Anderson Creek

Basin features
- Progression: Anderson Creek → West Branch Susquehanna River → Susquehanna River → Chesapeake Bay → Atlantic Ocean
- River system: Susquehanna River
- Tributaries
  - left: unnamed tributaries
  - right: unnamed tributaries
- Bridges: Home Camp Road, Muzz Run Road, Home Camp Road

Dressler Run is a 1.45 mi (2.33 km) long 1st order tributary to Anderson Creek in Clearfield County, Pennsylvania. This is the only stream in the United States with this name.

== Course ==
Dressler Run rises about 0.25 miles northwest of Home Camp, Pennsylvania, and then flows southwest and turns southeast to join Anderson Creek in Du Bois Reservoir at Home Camp.

== Watershed ==
Dressler Run drains 1.20 square miles (3.1 km^{2}) of area, receives about 44.3 in/year of precipitation, has a wetness index of 421.75, and is about 49% forested.

== See also ==
- List of Pennsylvania Rivers

== Watershed Maps ==
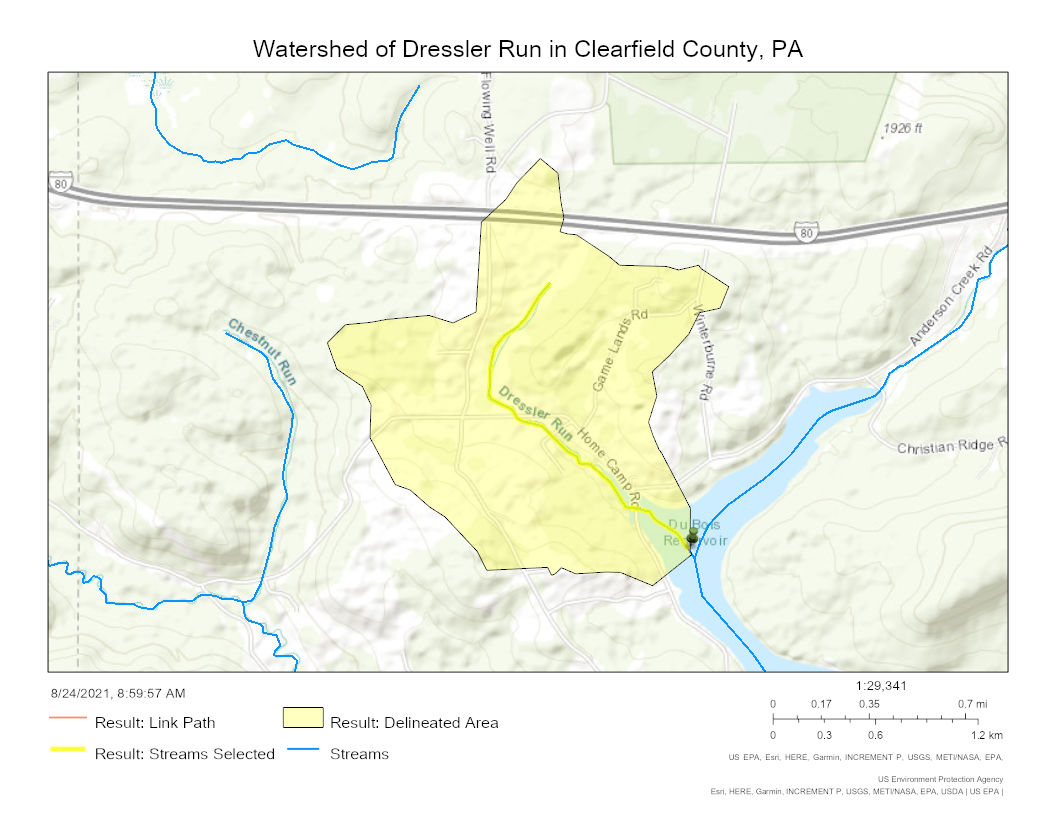
Watershed and Course of Dressler Run in Clearfield County, Pennsylvania, USA
