= Stony Run (Anderson Creek tributary) =

Stream in Pennsylvania, USA

Stony Run Tributary to Anderson Creek
- Location of Stony Run mouth Stony Run (Anderson Creek tributary) (the United States)

Location
- Country: United States
- State: Pennsylvania
- County: Clearfield

Physical characteristics
- Source: Lick Run divide
  - location: about 2 miles southeast of Anderson Creek, Pennsylvania
  - coordinates: 41°06′37″N 078°31′35″W
  - elevation: 2,078 ft (633 m)
- Mouth
  - location: about 1.5 miles northeast of Home Camp, Pennsylvania
  - coordinates: 41°07′41″N 078°36′23″W
  - elevation: 1,690 ft (520 m)
- Length: 4.92 mi (7.92 km)
- Basin size: 6.44 square miles (16.7 km^{2})
- Discharge
  - location: Anderson Creek
  - average: 11.87 cu ft/s (0.336 m^{3}/s) at mouth with Anderson Creek

Basin features
- Progression: Anderson Creek → West Branch Susquehanna River → Susquehanna River → Chesapeake Bay → Atlantic Ocean
- River system: Susquehanna River
- Tributaries
  - left: unnamed tributaries
  - right: Whitney Run
- Bridges: PA 153, I-80 (x2)

Stony Run is a 4.92 mi (7.92 km) long 2nd order tributary to Anderson Creek in Clearfield County, Pennsylvania.

== Course ==
Stony Run rises about 2 miles southeast of Anderson Creek, Pennsylvania, and then flows generally west-northwest to join Anderson Creek about 1.5 miles northeast of Home Camp.

== Watershed ==
Stony Run drains 6.44 square miles (16.7 km^{2}) of area, receives about 45.5 in/year of precipitation, has a wetness index of 455.06, and is about 78% forested.

== See also ==
- List of Pennsylvania Rivers

== Watershed Maps ==
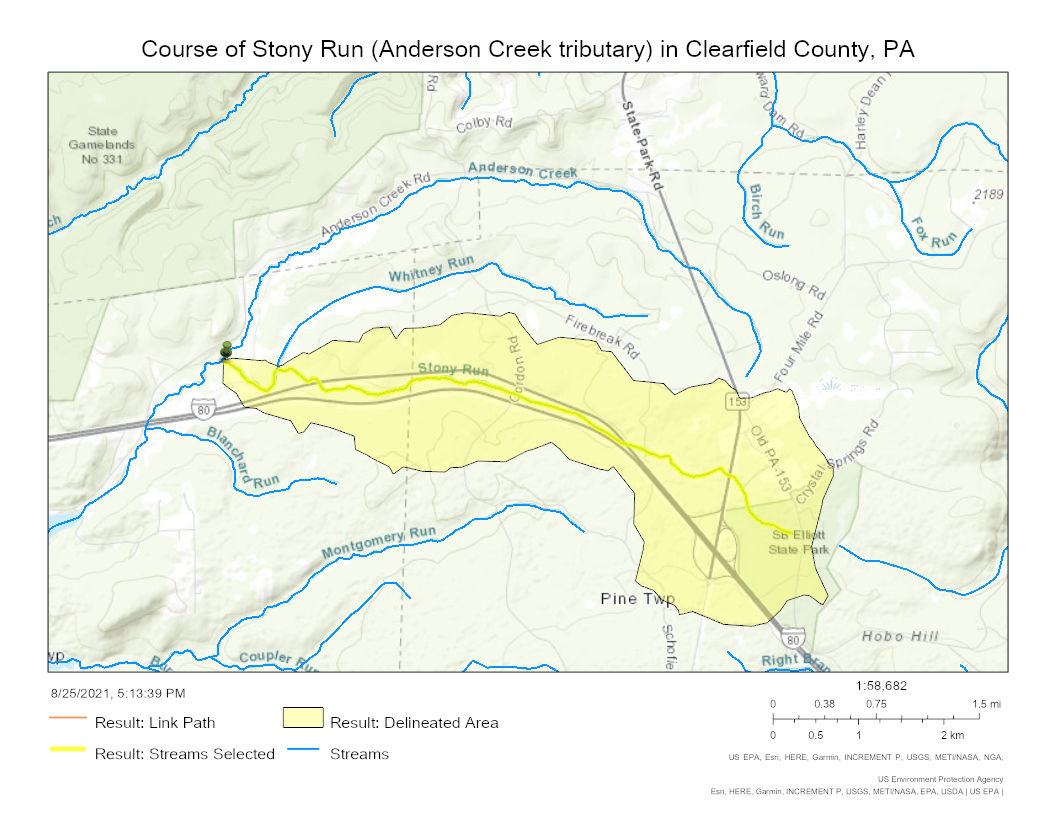
Course of Stony Run (Anderson Creek tributary) in Clearfield County, Pennsylvania, USA

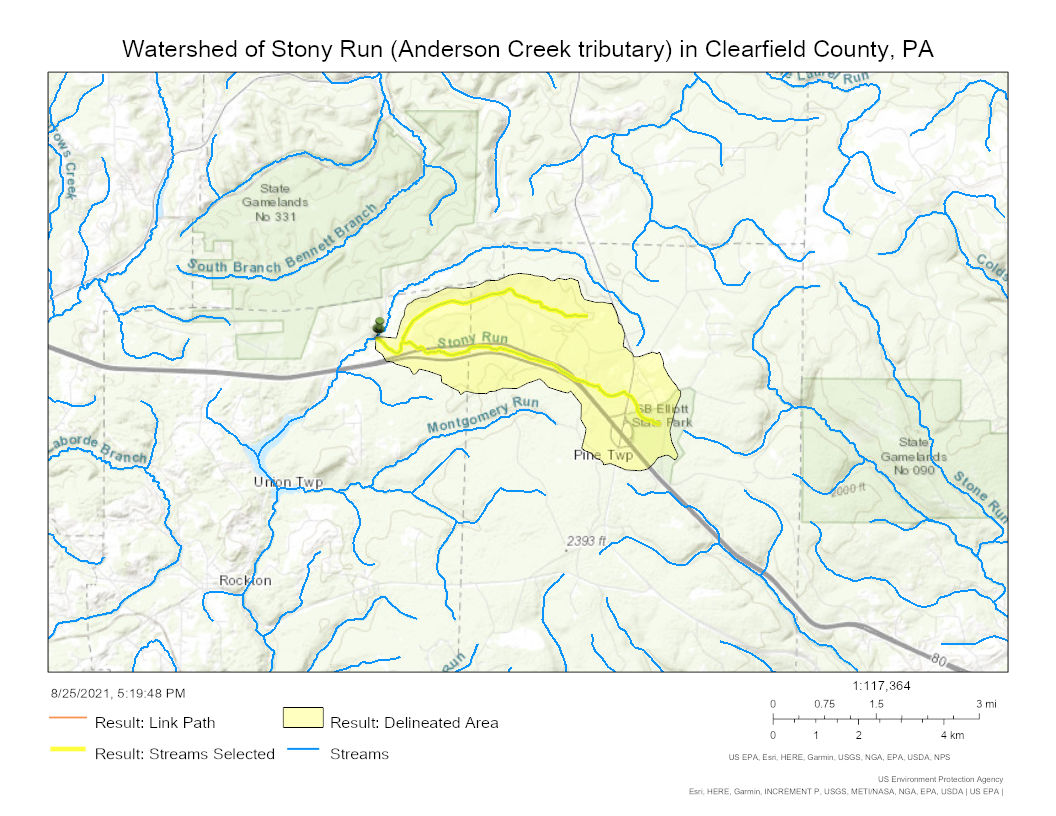
Watershed of Stony Run (Anderson Creek tributary) in Clearfield County, Pennsylvania, USA
