= Irvin Branch (Anderson Creek tributary) =

Stream in Pennsylvania, USA

Irvin Branch Tributary to Anderson Creek
- Location of Irvin Branch mouth Irvin Branch (Anderson Creek tributary) (the United States)

Location
- Country: United States
- State: Pennsylvania
- County: Clearfield

Physical characteristics
- Source: unnamed tributary to Panther Run divide
  - location: about 5 miles north of Greenville, Pennsylvania
  - coordinates: 41°03′18″N 078°36′11″W
  - elevation: 2,150 ft (660 m)
- Mouth
  - location: about 0.5 miles northeast of Greenville, Pennsylvania
  - coordinates: 41°01′09″N 078°35′19″W
  - elevation: 1,430 ft (440 m)
- Length: 2.91 mi (4.68 km)
- Basin size: 2.18 square miles (5.6 km^{2})
- Discharge
  - location: Anderson Creek
  - average: 3.88 cu ft/s (0.110 m^{3}/s) at mouth with Anderson Creek

Basin features
- Progression: Anderson Creek → West Branch Susquehanna River → Susquehanna River → Chesapeake Bay → Atlantic Ocean
- River system: Susquehanna River
- Tributaries
  - left: unnamed tributaries
  - right: unnamed tributaries
- Bridges: none

Irvin Branch is a 2.91 mi (4.68 km) long 1st order tributary to Anderson Creek in Clearfield County, Pennsylvania. Irvin Branch is classified as a coldwater fishery (CWF) and contains a population of Brook Trout. Some mining has occurred in the headwaters of the stream, but it is not considered impaired by it.

== Course ==
Irvin Branch rises about 5 miles north of Greenville, Pennsylvania, and then flows southeast to join Anderson Creek about 0.5 miles northeast of Greenville.

== Watershed ==
Irvin Branch drains 2.18 square miles (5.6 km^{2}) of area, receives about 45.1 in/year of precipitation, has a wetness index of 377.55, and is about 97% forested.

== See also ==
- List of Pennsylvania Rivers

== Watershed Maps ==
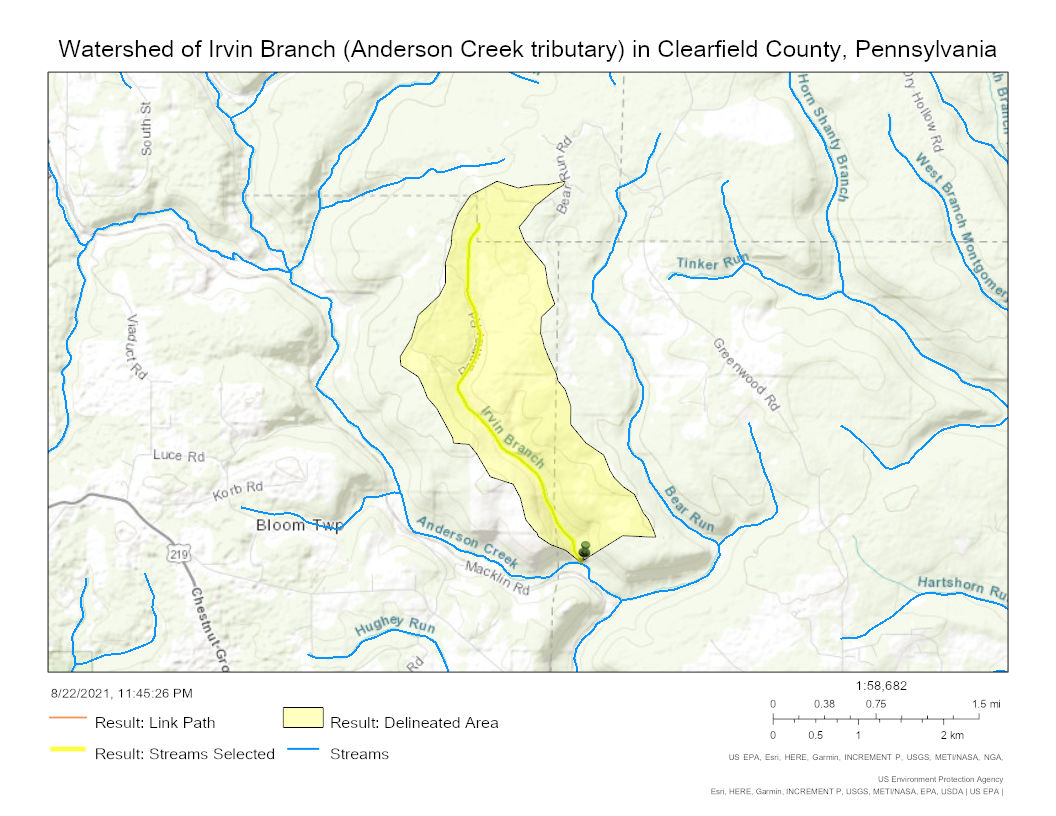
Course and Watershed of Irvin Branch (Anderson Creek tributary) in Clearfield County, Pennsylvania, USA
