= DuBois Area School District =

School district in Pennsylvania

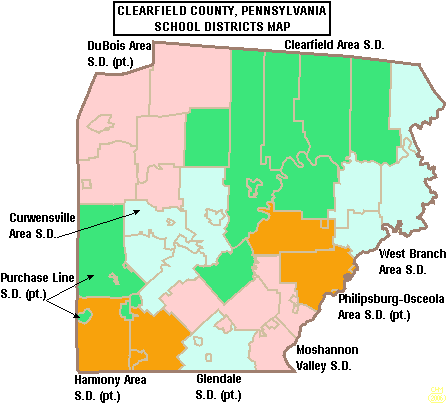

Address
- 500 Liberty Boulevard DuBois, Clearfield County and Jefferson County, Pennsylvania, 15801; United States

District information
- Type: Public

Students and staff
- District mascot: Beavers
- Colors: Red, black, and white

Other information
- Website: www.dubois.school

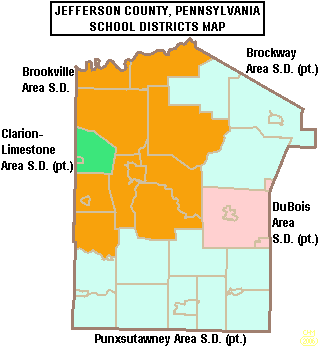
DuBois Area School District in Jefferson County

The DuBois Area School District is a large, rural/suburban public school district located in central Pennsylvania. The district spans portions of two counties. It encompasses an area of approximately 258 square miles (670 km^{2}) with a population of 32,241 (as of 2000). In Clearfield County it covers the City of DuBois, the Boroughs of Falls Creek and Troutville and Bloom Township, Brady Township, Huston Township, Sandy Township and Union Township. In Jefferson County it covers the Boroughs of Falls Creek, Reynoldsville and Sykesville and Winslow Township. According to 2000 federal census data, it served a resident population of 32,200. By 2010, the district's population declined to 30,958 people. The educational attainment levels for the School District population (25 years old and over) were 89.9% high school graduates and 17.6% college graduates.

== Schools ==
The district operates six public schools.

- DuBois Area Senior High School (9-12)
- DuBois Area Middle School (5-8)
- C.G. Johnson Elementary School (K-4)
- Juniata Elementary School (K-4)
- Oklahoma Elementary School (K-4)
- Wasson Avenue Elementary School (K-4)

High school students may choose to attend Jefferson County Dubois Area Vocational-Technical School for training in the construction and mechanical trades, the culinary arts and allied health careers. The Riverview Intermediate Unit IU6 provides the district with a wide variety of services like specialized education for disabled students and hearing, speech and visual disability services and professional development for staff and faculty.

== Extracurriculars ==
Dubois Area School District offers a wide variety of clubs, activities and an extensive sports program.

=== Sports ===
The district funds:

Varsity

Boys

- Baseball - AAAA
- Basketball - AAAA
- Cross Country - AAA
- Football - AAAA
- Golf - AAA
- Rifle - AA
- Soccer - AAA
- Swimming and Diving - AAA
- Tennis - AAA
- Track and Field - AAA
- Volleyball - AAA
- Wrestling - AAA

Girls

- Basketball - AAAA
- Cheer - AAAA
- Cross Country - AAA
- Golf - AAA
- Gymnastics - AAAA
- Rifle - AAAA
- Soccer (Fall) - AAA
- Softball - AAAA
- Swimming and Diving - AAA
- Girls' Tennis - AAA
- Track and Field - AAA
- Volleyball - AAA

Middle School Sports

Boys

- Basketball
- Cross Country
- Football
- Soccer
- Track and Field
- Wrestling

Girls

- Basketball
- Cross Country
- Soccer (fall)
- Softball
- Track and Field
- Volleyball

According to PIAA directory July 2013
