= Panther Run (Anderson Creek tributary) =

Stream in Pennsylvania, USA

Panther Run Tributary to Anderson Creek
- Location of Panther Run mouth Panther Run (Anderson Creek tributary) (the United States)

Location
- Country: United States
- State: Pennsylvania
- County: Clearfield

Physical characteristics
- Source: Bear Run divide
  - location: about 5 miles east of Rockton, Pennsylvania
  - coordinates: 41°04′09″N 078°35′39″W
  - elevation: 2,160 ft (660 m)
- Mouth
  - location: about 1 mile east-southeast of Anderson, Pennsylvania
  - coordinates: 41°02′58″N 078°37′43″W
  - elevation: 1,522 ft (464 m)
- Length: 2.94 mi (4.73 km)
- Basin size: 2.71 square miles (7.0 km^{2})
- Discharge
  - location: Anderson Creek
  - average: 4.96 cu ft/s (0.140 m^{3}/s) at mouth with Anderson Creek

Basin features
- Progression: Anderson Creek → West Branch Susquehanna River → Susquehanna River → Chesapeake Bay → Atlantic Ocean
- River system: Susquehanna River
- Tributaries
  - left: unnamed tributaries
  - right: unnamed tributaries
- Bridges: none

Panther Run is a 2.94 mi (4.73 km) long 2nd order tributary to Anderson Creek in Clearfield County, Pennsylvania.

== Course ==
Panther Run rises about 5 miles east of Rockton, Pennsylvania, and then flows generally southwest to join Anderson Creek about 1 mile east-southeast of Anderson.

== Watershed ==
Panther Run drains 2.71 square miles (7.0 km^{2}) of area, receives about 45.5 in/year of precipitation, has a wetness index of 409.87, and is about 97% forested.

== See also ==
- List of Pennsylvania Rivers

== Watershed Maps ==
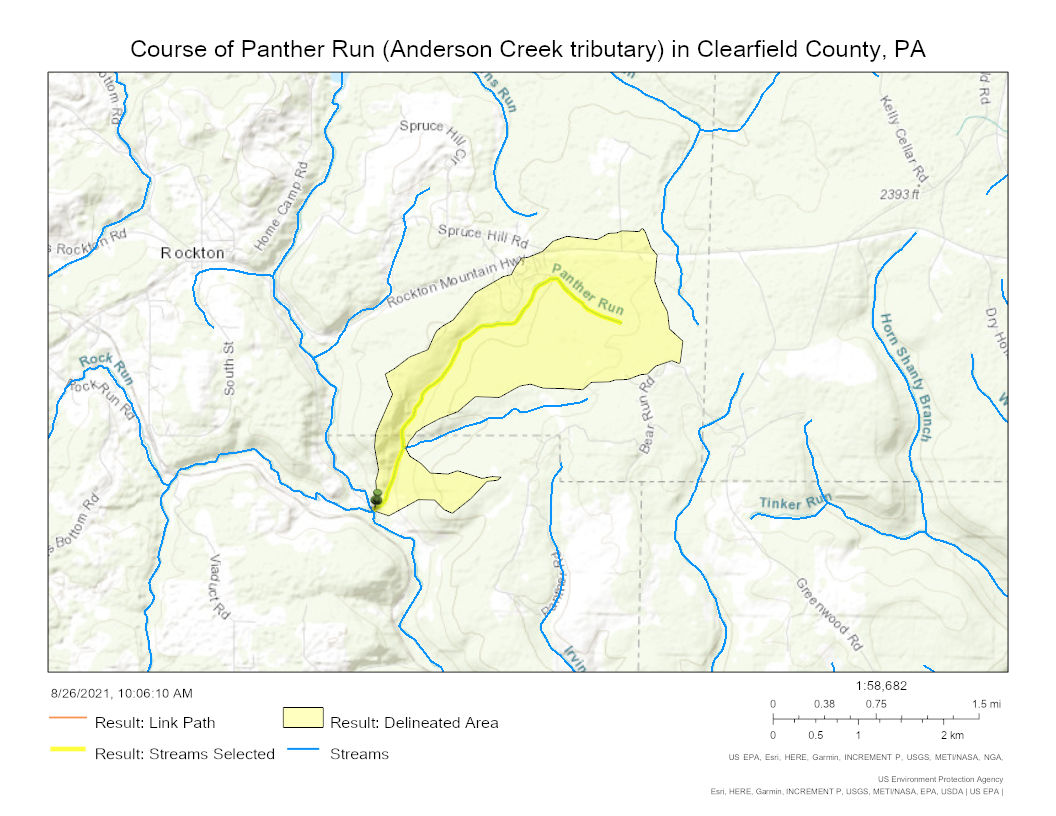
Course of Panther Run (Anderson Creek tributary) in Clearfield County, Pennsylvania, USA

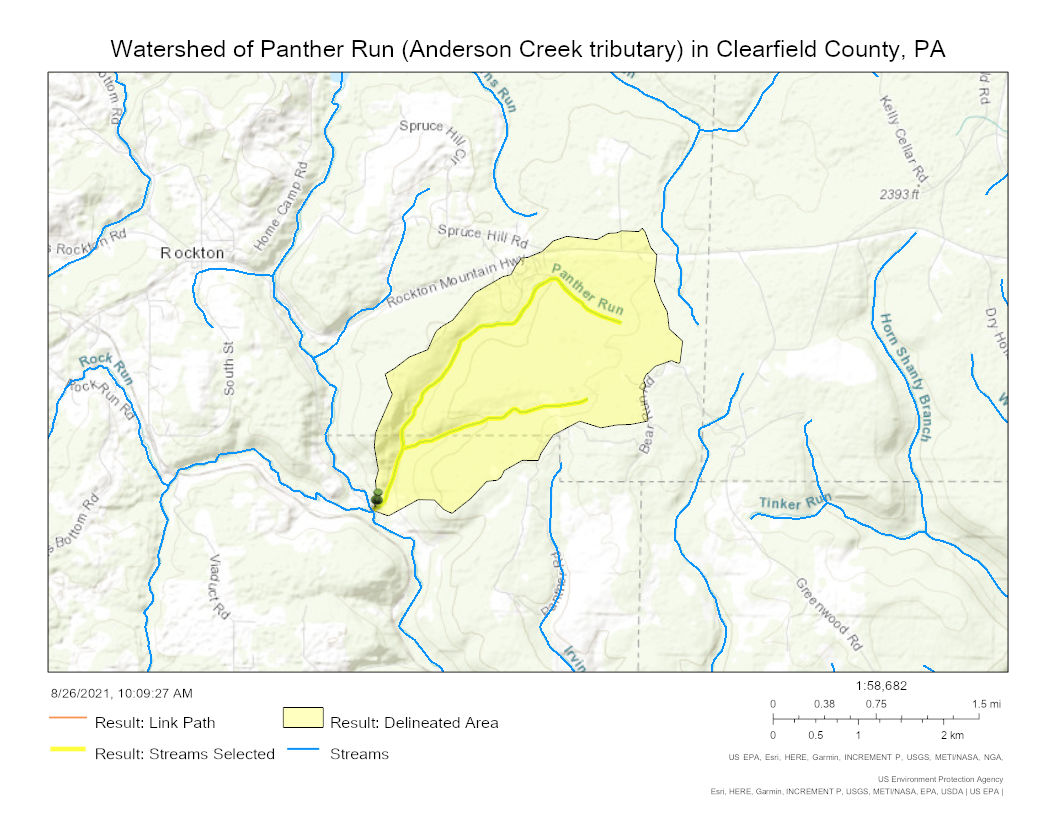
Watershed of Panther Run (Anderson Creek tributary) in Clearfield County, Pennsylvania, USA
