= Blanchard Run (Anderson Creek tributary) =

Stream in Pennsylvania, United States

Blanchard Run Tributary to Anderson Creek
- Location of Blanchard Run mouth Blanchard Run (Anderson Creek tributary) (the United States)

Location
- Country: United States
- State: Pennsylvania
- County: Clearfield

Physical characteristics
- Source: Montgomery Run divide
  - location: about 2.5 miles east-northeast of Home Camp, Pennsylvania
  - coordinates: 41°06′56″N 078°35′25″W
  - elevation: 1,900 ft (580 m)
- Mouth
  - location: about 1 mile northeast of Home Camp, Pennsylvania
  - coordinates: 41°07′16″N 078°36′59″W
  - elevation: 1,690 ft (520 m)
- Length: 1.71 mi (2.75 km)
- Basin size: 0.99 square miles (2.6 km^{2})
- Discharge
  - location: Anderson Creek
  - average: 1.77 cu ft/s (0.050 m^{3}/s) at mouth with Anderson Creek

Basin features
- Progression: Anderson Creek → West Branch Susquehanna River → Susquehanna River → Chesapeake Bay → Atlantic Ocean
- River system: Susquehanna River
- Tributaries
  - left: unnamed tributaries
  - right: unnamed tributaries
- Bridges: none

Blanchard Run is a 1.71 mi (2.75 km) long 1st order tributary to Anderson Creek in Clearfield County, Pennsylvania.

== Course ==
Blanchard Run rises about 2.5 miles east-northeast of Home Camp, Pennsylvania, and then flows generally northwest to join Anderson Creek about 1 mile northeast of Home Camp.

== Watershed ==
Blanchard Run drains 0.99 square miles (2.6 km^{2}) of area, receives about 44.9 in/year of precipitation, has a wetness index of 434.11, and is about 97% forested.

== See also ==
- List of Pennsylvania Rivers

== Watershed Maps ==
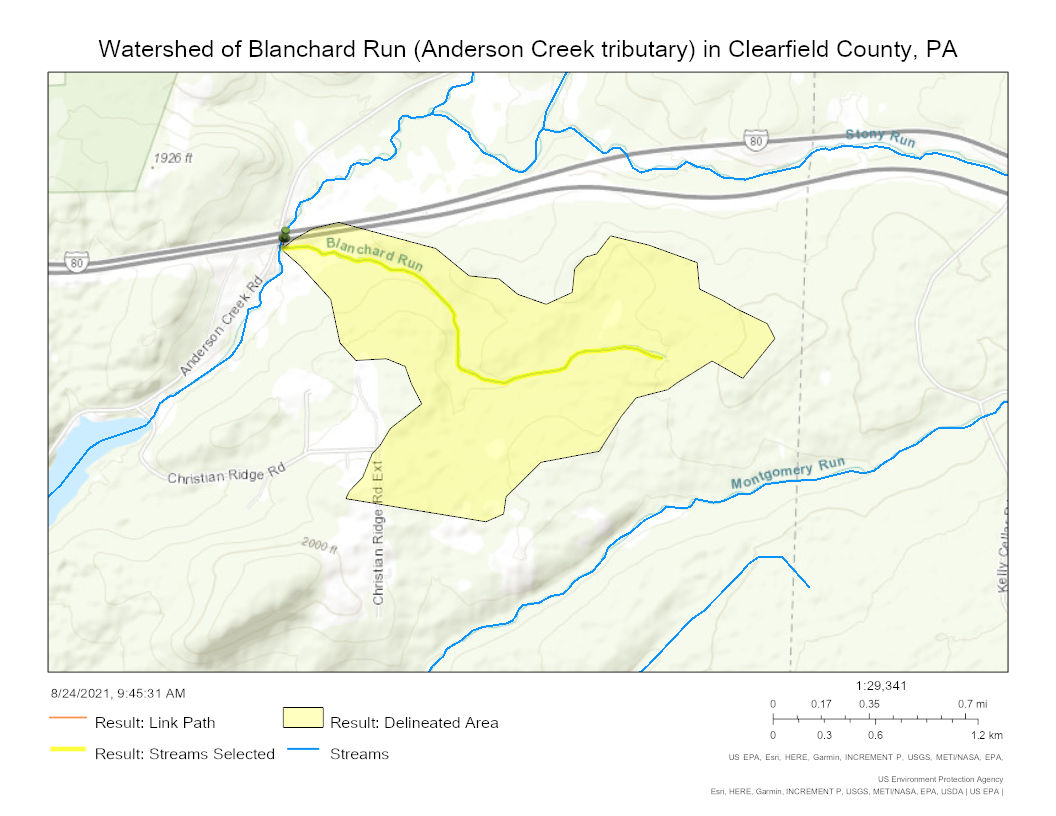
Watershed and Course of Blanchard Run (Anderson Creek tributary) in Clearfield County, Pennsylvania, USA
