= Bloom Township, Pennsylvania =

Township in Pennsylvania, US

Coordinates: 41°02′00″N 78°37′59″W

- Township
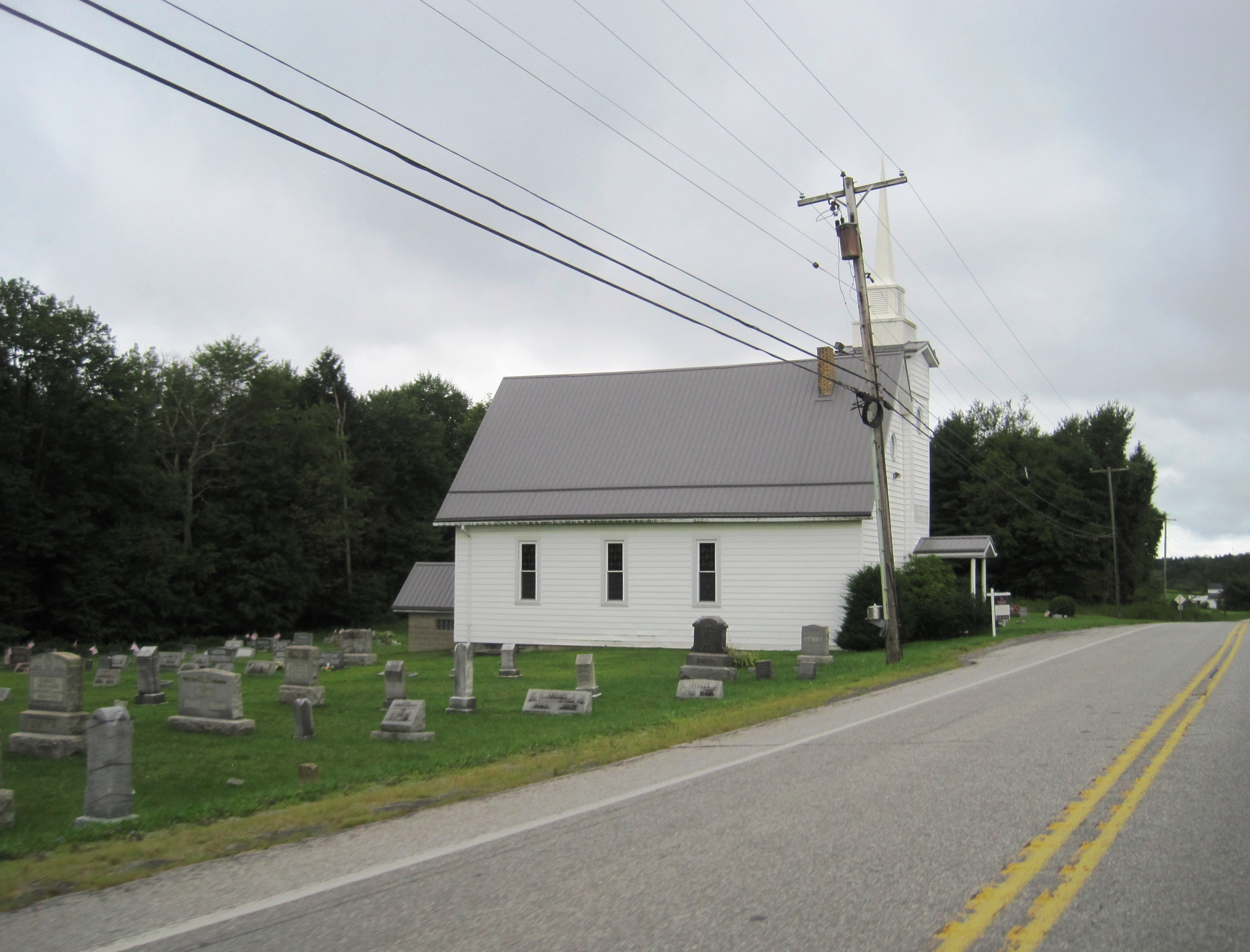
- Chestnut Grove United Methodist Church and Cemetery

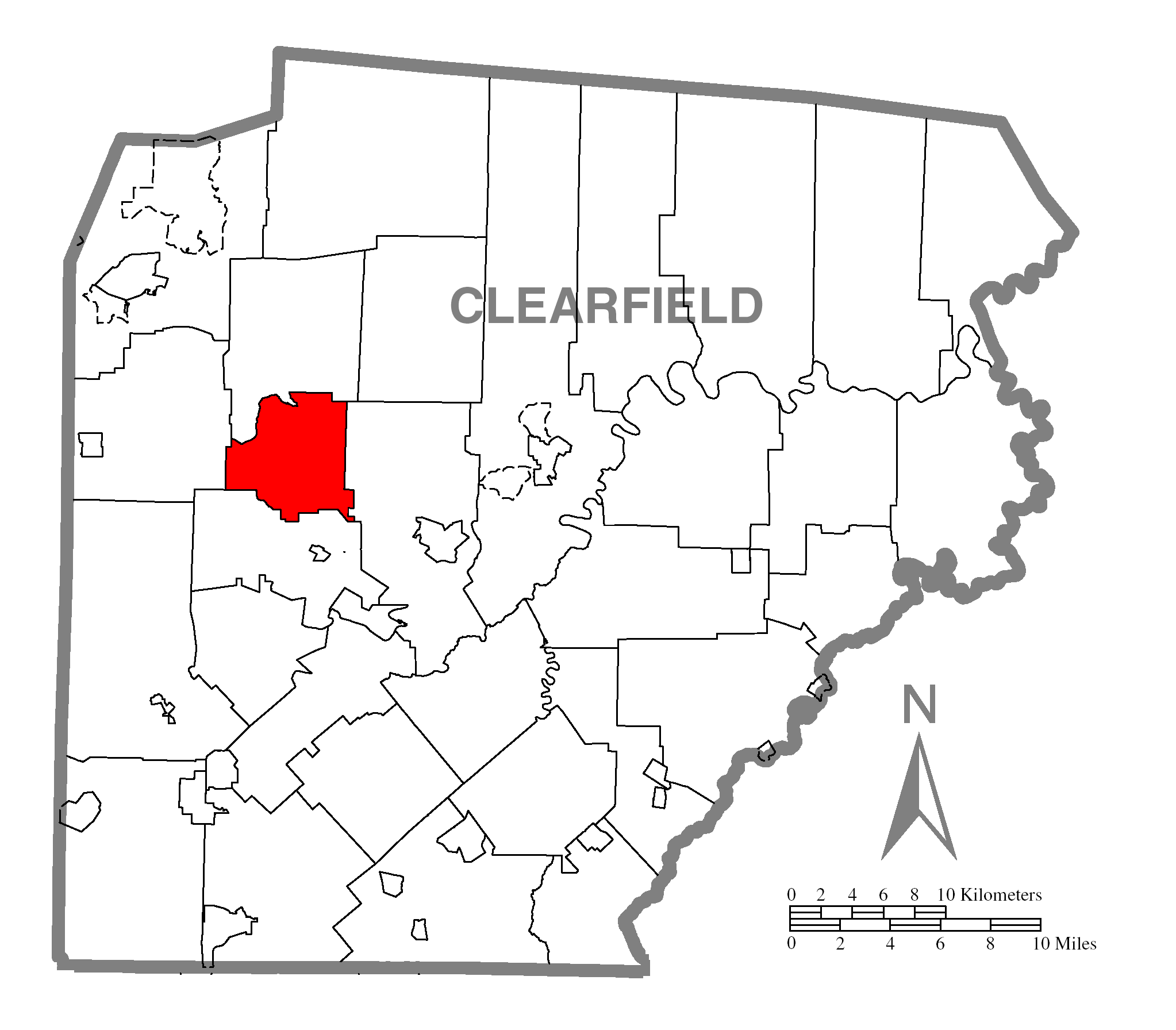
- Map of Clearfield County, Pennsylvania highlighting Bloom Township

- Map of Clearfield County, Pennsylvania
- Country: United States
- State: Pennsylvania
- County: Clearfield
- Settled: 1815
- Incorporated: 1860

Area
  - Total: 18.89 sq mi (48.93 km^{2})
  - Land: 18.83 sq mi (48.78 km^{2})
  - Water: 0.058 sq mi (0.15 km^{2})

Population (2020)
  - Total: 381 ▼
  - Estimate (2022): 375 ▼
  - Density: 21.6/sq mi (8.34/km^{2})
- Time zone: UTC-5 (Eastern (EST))
  - Summer (DST): UTC-4 (EDT)
- Area code: 814
- FIPS code: 42-033-07008

Bloom Township is a township in Clearfield County, Pennsylvania, United States. The population was 381 at the 2020 census.

== Geography ==
According to the United States Census Bureau, the township has a total area of 18.9 square miles (49 km^{2}), of which 18.9 square miles (49 km^{2}) is land and 0.04 square miles (0.10 km^{2}) (0.11%) is water.

== Communities ==
- Chestnut Grove
- Greenville
- Laborde

== Demographics ==
Historical population
Census	Pop.	Note	%±
1970	440		—
1980	500		13.6%
1990	454		−9.2%
2000	412		−9.3%
2010	414		0.5%
2020	381		−8.0%
2022 (est.)	375		−1.6%
U.S. Decennial Census

As of the census of 2000, there were 412 people, 169 households, and 119 families residing in the township. The population density was 21.8 people per square mile (8.4/km^{2}). There were 220 housing units at an average density of 11.6/sq mi (4.5/km^{2}). The racial makeup of the township was 99.76% White and 0.24% Native American.

There were 169 households, out of which 26.0% had children under the age of 18 living with them, 62.1% were married couples living together, 5.3% had a female householder with no husband present, and 29.0% were non-families. 25.4% of all households were made up of individuals, and 9.5% had someone living alone who was 65 years of age or older. The average household size was 2.44 and the average family size was 2.96.

In the township the population was spread out, with 22.3% under the age of 18, 5.3% from 18 to 24, 26.5% from 25 to 44, 28.6% from 45 to 64, and 17.2% who were 65 years of age or older. The median age was 43 years. For every 100 males, there were 87.3 females. For every 100 males age 18 and over, there were 91.6 females.

The median income for a household in the township was $30,909, and the median income for a family was $33,750. Males had a median income of $28,611 versus $22,813 for females. The per capita income for the township was $15,470. About 9.3% of families and 8.7% of the population were below the poverty line, including 3.7% of those under age 18 and none of those age 65 or over.

== Education ==
Students in Bloom Township attend schools in the DuBois Area School District.

== See also ==
- Western Pennsylvania
- Bilger's Rocks
