= Kratzer Run =

Stream in Pennsylvania, USA

Kratzer Run Tributary to Anderson Creek
- Location of Kratzer Run mouth Kratzer Run (the United States)

Location
- Country: United States
- State: Pennsylvania
- County: Clearfield
- Borough: Grampian

Physical characteristics
- Source: Hiles Run divide
  - location: about 1 mile southeast of Grampian, Pennsylvania
  - coordinates: 40°56′24″N 078°36′15″W
  - elevation: 1,620 ft (490 m)
- Mouth
  - location: Bridgeport, Pennsylvania
  - coordinates: 40°58′35″N 078°32′48″W
  - elevation: 1,181 ft (360 m)
- Length: 5.75 mi (9.25 km)
- Basin size: 15.41 square miles (39.9 km^{2})
- Discharge
  - location: Anderson Creek
  - average: 24.39 cu ft/s (0.691 m^{3}/s) at mouth with Anderson Creek

Basin features
- Progression: Anderson Creek → West Branch Susquehanna River → Susquehanna River → Chesapeake Bay → Atlantic Ocean
- River system: Susquehanna River
- Tributaries
  - left: Bilger Run
  - right: unnamed tributaries
- Bridges: Haytown Road, PA 729, Rustic Road

Kratzer Run is a 5.75 mi (9.25 km)-long 3rd order tributary to Anderson Creek in Clearfield County, Pennsylvania. It is the only stream bearing this name in the United States.

== Geography and environmental issues ==
Kratzer Run is the largest tributary to Anderson Creek and drains a region of farmland and places that have been surface mined for coal. As a result, Kratzer Run suffers from Acid Mine Drainage (AMD) and the impact of adjacent highways and communities is considered the most degraded tributary to Anderson Creek.

Bilger Run, a tributary, is also impaired by AMD. Numerous places of erosion have been noted as well. In spite of the impacts, numerous efforts are underway to mitigate the pollution.

== Variant names ==
According to the Geographic Names Information System, it has also been known historically as:

- Little Anderson Run

== Course ==
Kratzer Run rises about 1 mile southeast of Grampian, Pennsylvania, and then flows generally east to join Anderson Creek at Bridgeport.

== Watershed ==
Kratzer Run drains 15.41 square miles (39.9 km^{2}) of area, receives about 43.3 in/year of precipitation, has a wetness index of 368.63, and is about 63% forested.

== See also ==
- List of Pennsylvania Rivers

== Watershed Maps ==
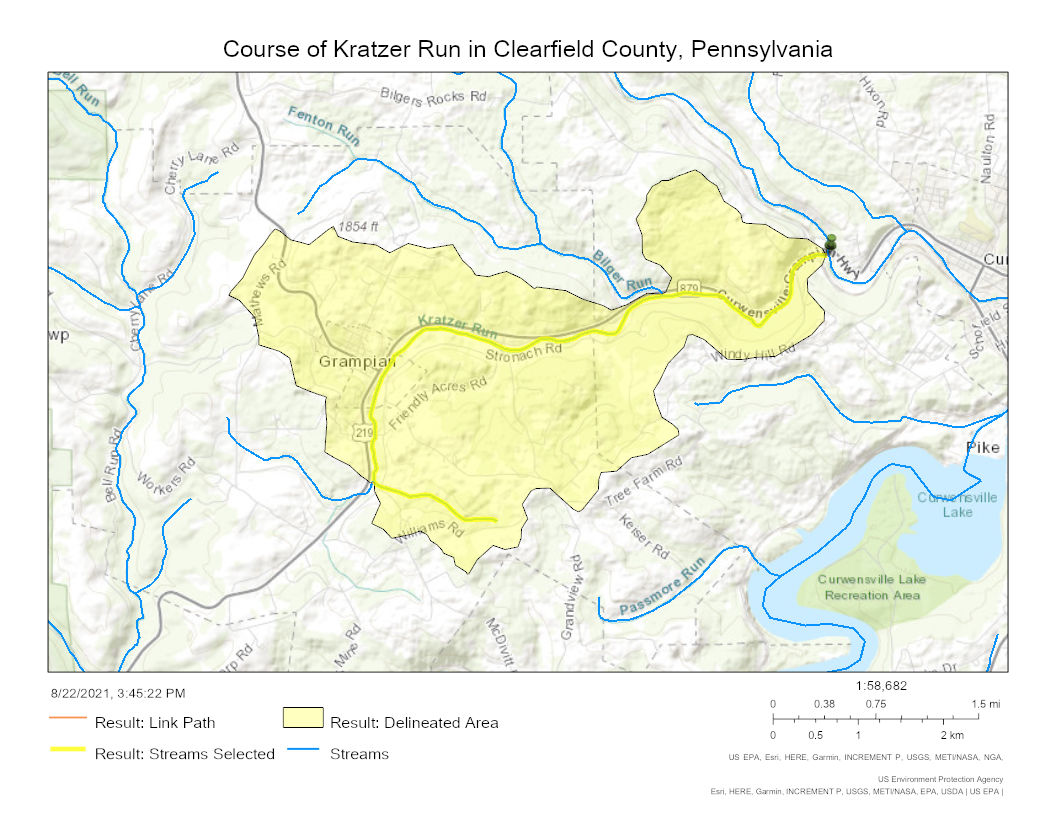
Course of Kratzer Run in Clearfield County, Pennsylvania, USA

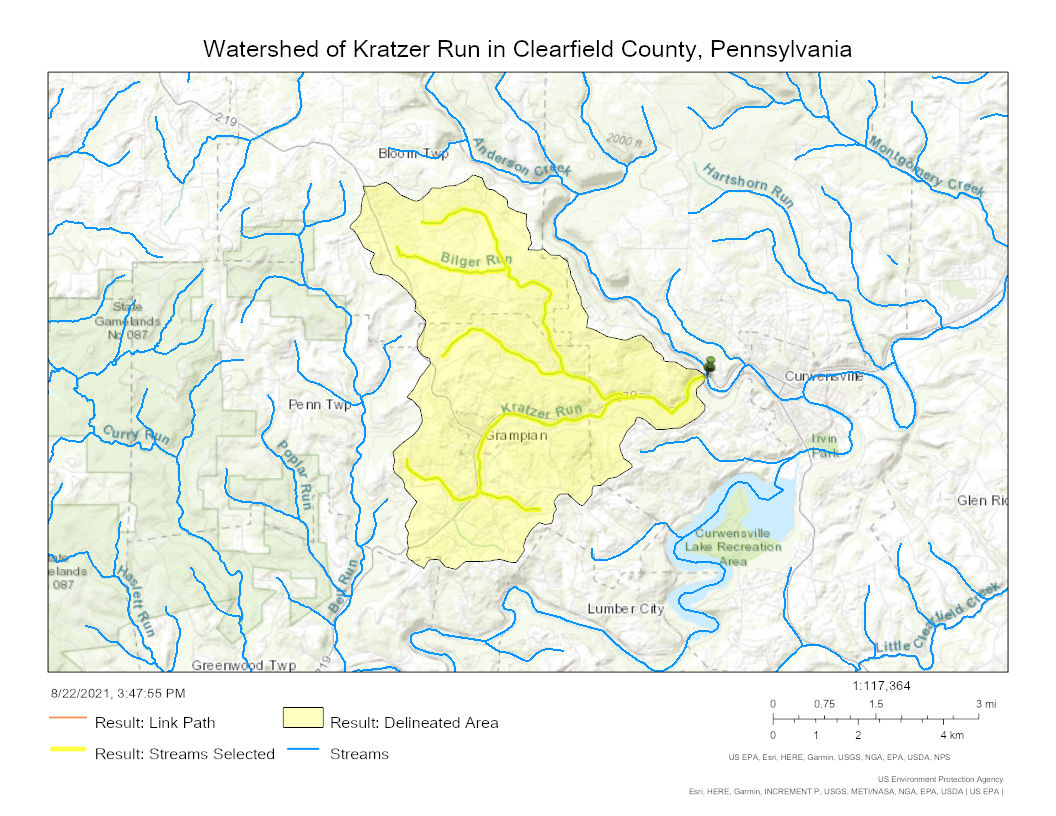
Watershed of Kratzer Run in Clearfield County, Pennsylvania, USA
