= Anderson Creek (Pennsylvania) =

Stream in Pennsylvania, US

Anderson Creek Tributary to West Branch Susquehanna River
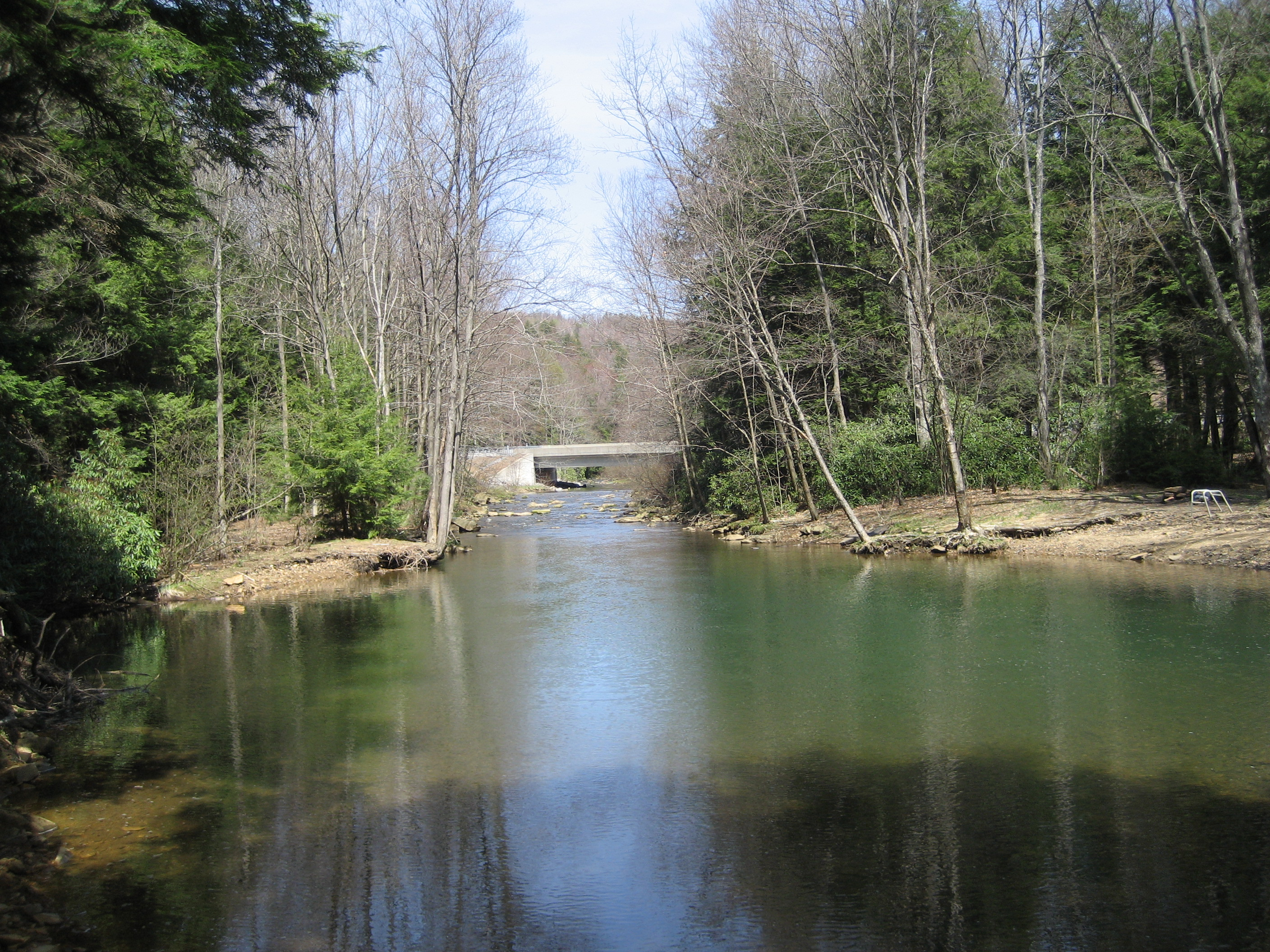
- Brown Springs, Moshannon State Forest, Union Township, Clearfield County, PA

- Location of Anderson Creek mouth Anderson Creek (Pennsylvania) (the United States)

Location
- Country: United States
- State: Pennsylvania
- County: Clearfield
- Borough: Curwensville

Physical characteristics
- Source: Stony Fork divide
  - location: about 1.5 miles southeast of Anderson Creek, Pennsylvania
  - coordinates: 41°07′37″N 78°31′59″W
  - elevation: 2,080 ft (630 m)
- Mouth
  - location: Curwensville, Pennsylvania
  - coordinates: 40°58′19″N 78°31′13″W
  - elevation: 1,132 ft (345 m)
- Length: 22.92 mi (36.89 km)
- Basin size: 77.71 square miles (201.3 km^{2})
- Discharge
  - location: West Branch Susquehanna River
  - average: 133.40 cu ft/s (3.777 m^{3}/s) at mouth with West Branch Susquehanna River

Basin features
- Progression: West Branch Susquehanna River → Susquehanna River → Chesapeake Bay → Atlantic Ocean
- River system: Susquehanna River
- Tributaries
  - left: Stony Run; Blanchard Run; Montgomery Run; Panther Run; Irvin Branch; Bear Run
  - right: Dressler Run; Little Anderson Creek; Kratzer Run
- Waterbodies: Du Bois Reservoir
- Bridges: Fern Wood Road, Twin Oaks Road, PA 153, Dave Long Street, Gordon Road, I-80, Rockton Mountain Highway, Brown Springs Lane, Bridgeport Road, PA 879, Windy Hill Road, PA 453, River Street

Anderson Creek is a 23.6-mile-long (38.0 km) tributary of the West Branch Susquehanna River in Clearfield County, Pennsylvania, United States.

The upstream portion of the Anderson Creek Watershed is a PA DCNR Conservation Area, and falls from Rockton Mountain, along Interstate I-80 in Clearfield County, Pennsylvania. Anderson Creek is classified as a Class II-III+ whitewater stream and defines the Eastern Continental Divide. Brown Springs, in the Moshannon State Forest, near Rockton, Pennsylvania, is a put-in for kayaking to the West Branch Susquehanna River at Bridgeport, Pennsylvania. The vertical drop of Anderson Creek is 1450 ft. to 1175 ft. "Anderson is a stream of considerable size, and in a region not so well supplied with raftable waters as this, might be well classed among rivers."

== Variant names ==
According to the Geographic Names Information System, it has also been known historically as:

- Anderson's Creek

== Great Shamokin Path ==
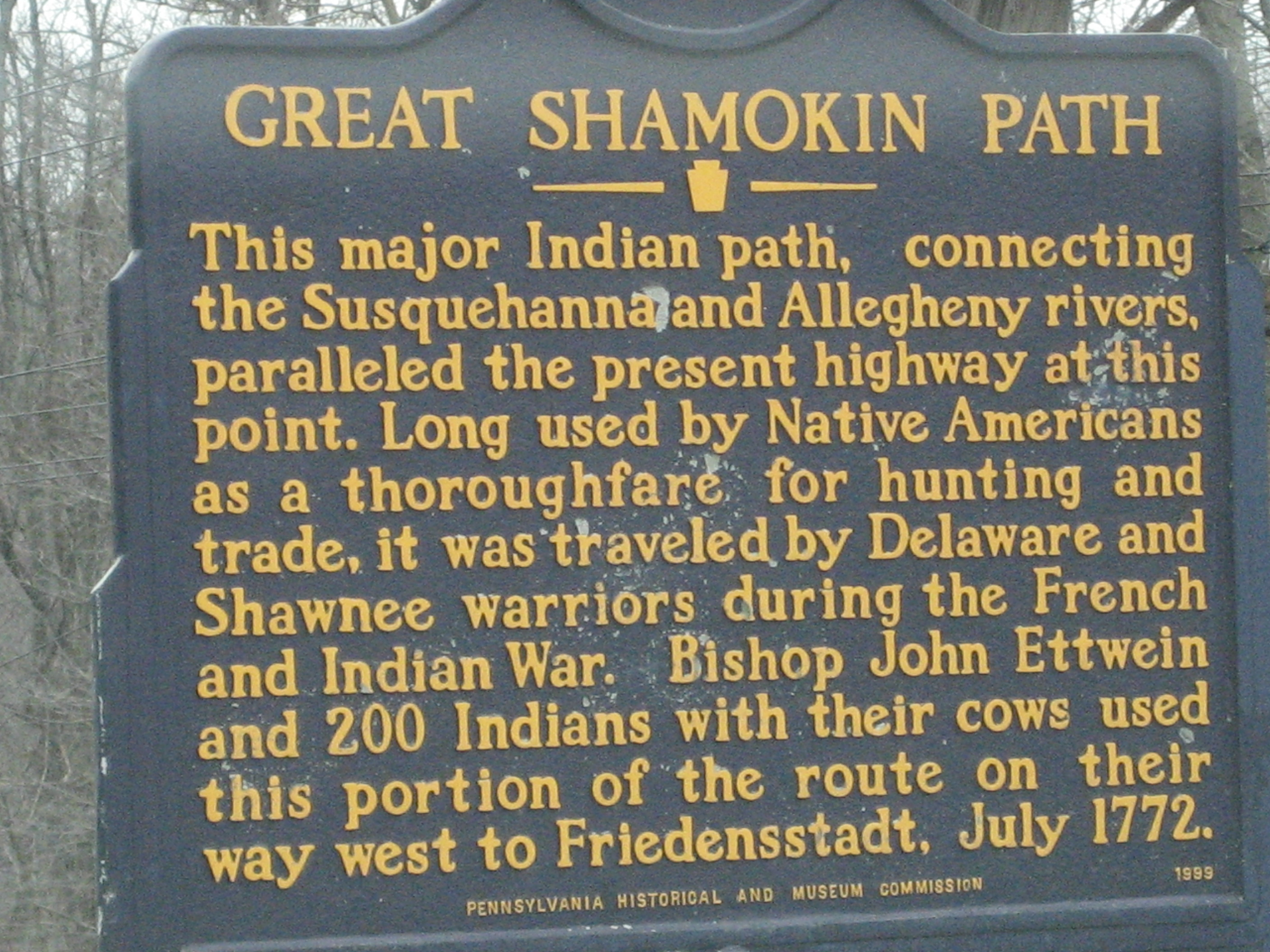
Marker location U.S. 119, 4 miles NE of Punxsutawney, Jefferson County, PA

The Anderson Creek corridor is part of the Great Shamokin Path from the native village Shamokin, on the Susquehanna River, to Kittanning, Pennsylvania, on the Allegheny River. The path ascended the steep Anderson Creek Gorge several miles, then it turned west at what is now known as Chestnut Grove, Bloom Township, Clearfield County, Pennsylvania, and then on to The Big Spring near Luthersburg, Brady Township, Pennsylvania.

=== Bilger's Rocks Prehistoric Site ===
The Anderson Creek corridor is the location of the Bilger's Rocks prehistoric McFate Culture site. During the latter portion of the Late Woodland Period (A.D. 1000–1580) groups belonging to the McFate culture inhabited portions of along the Allegheny Front in north central Pennsylvania. The site is in Bloom Township, Clearfield County, Pennsylvania, near the town of Grampian, Pennsylvania. The Bilger's Rocks Association owns and cares for the 175-acre tract and conducts educational programs for visitors. McFate sites have been located in Clearfield and Elk counties. A McFate site near Du Bois, Pennsylvania, the Hickory Kingdom "Kalgren site", was a stockaded fort on a projecting point of the Eastern Continental Divide and close to trail systems.

=== Early native peoples ===
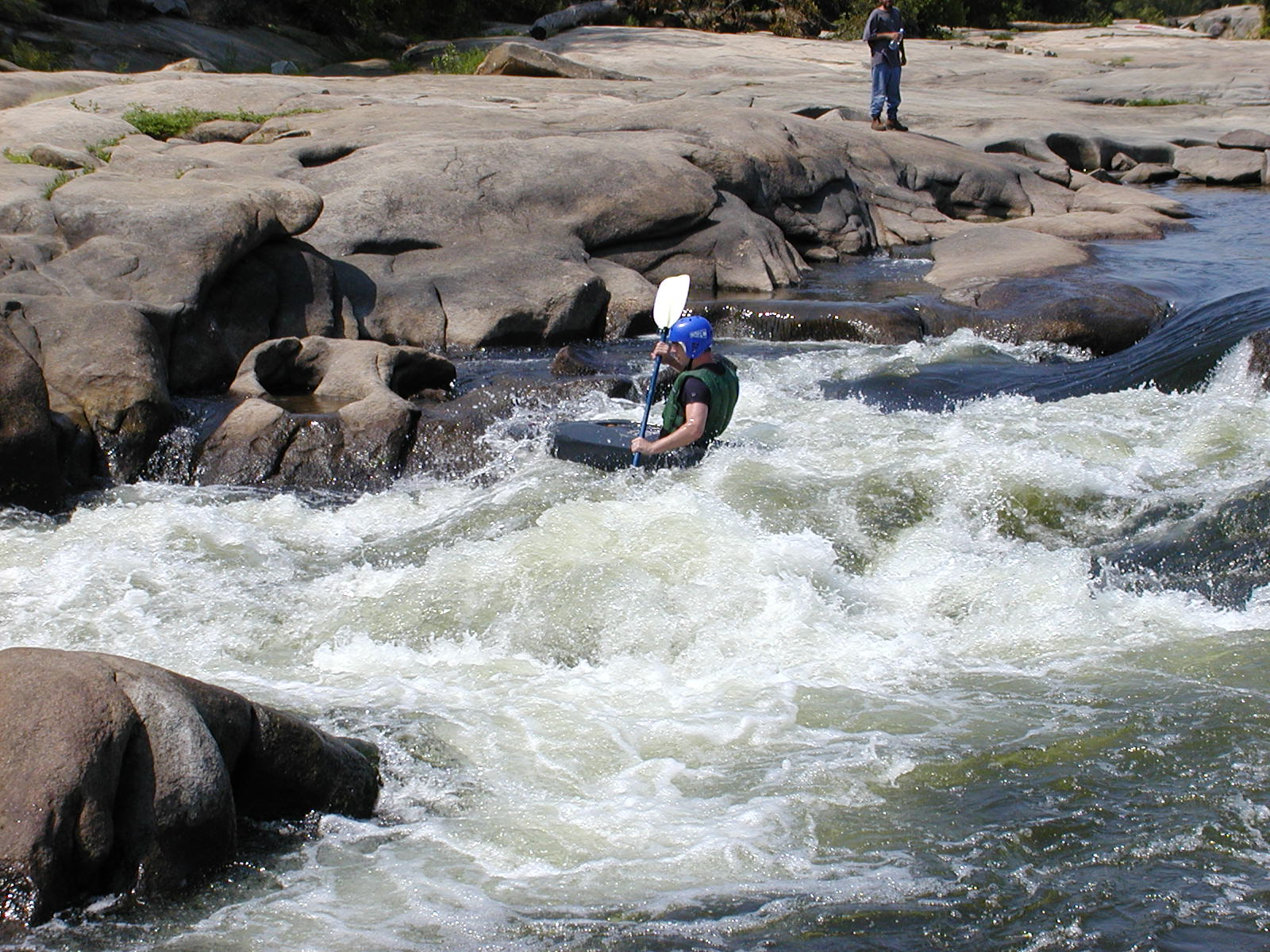
Anderson Creek is classified as a Class II-III+ classification whitewater stream, and falls from the highest mountain east of the Mississippi River on Interstate I-80 in Clearfield County, Pennsylvania.

Artifacts from the Curwensville, Pennsylvania, area demonstrate that various groups of Native Americans occupied the confluence of Anderson Creek and West Susquehanna Branch over a 10,000-year period. From AD 1000 to AD 1600, at least half a dozen groups lived in the vicinity of the Anderson Creek; the Clemson Island, Owasco, Shenks Ferry, Monongahela, and McFate or Black Minquas who were the last tribal entity to occupy the corridor. The Senecas from northern Pennsylvania wiped them out about 1650.

=== The French and Indian War ===
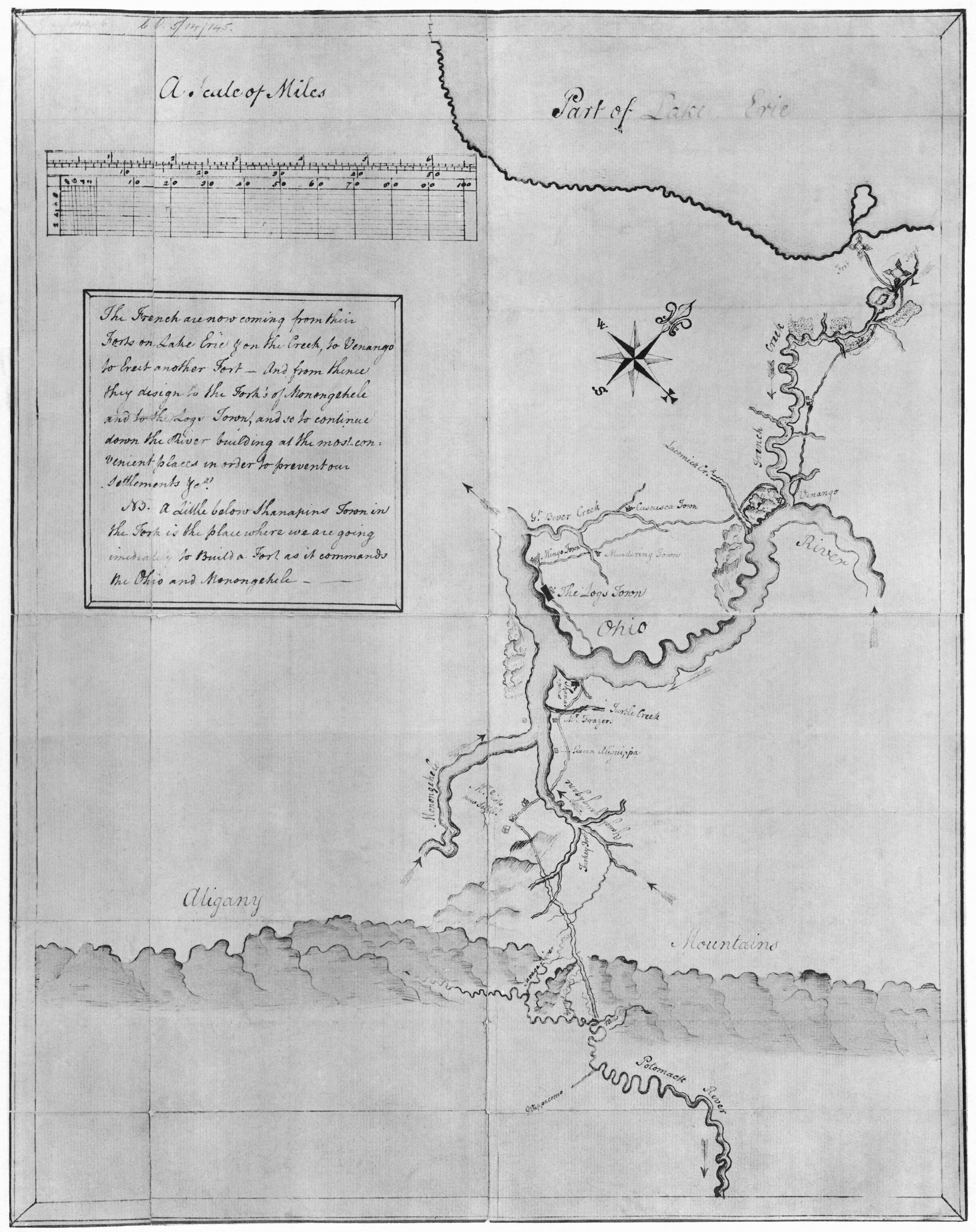
George Washington's map of French forts along the Allegheny River. During the French and Indian War in 1757–1758, French and Indian troops assembled at the mouth of Anderson Creek before the assault on Fort Augusta.

During the French and Indian War in 1757–1758, several hundred French and Indian troops traveled the Great Shamokin Path in an effort to destroy Fort Augusta, the main stronghold of the English at the junction of the east and west branches of the Susquehanna River. This army was gathered from the French posts at Duquesne, Kittanning, Venango and Le Boeuf and assembled at the mouth of Anderson Creek. Here, crude boats, rafts and bateau were constructed for passage down the Susquehanna River for the proposed attack. They dragged along with them two small brass cannon, but after reconnoitering found the distance too great for the guns to shoot from the hill opposite the fort. The defense at Fort Augusta was strong enough to resist attack by storming or by siege, and the attack was abandoned. A British defeat at Fort Augusta could have altered the history of the course of the French and Indian War.

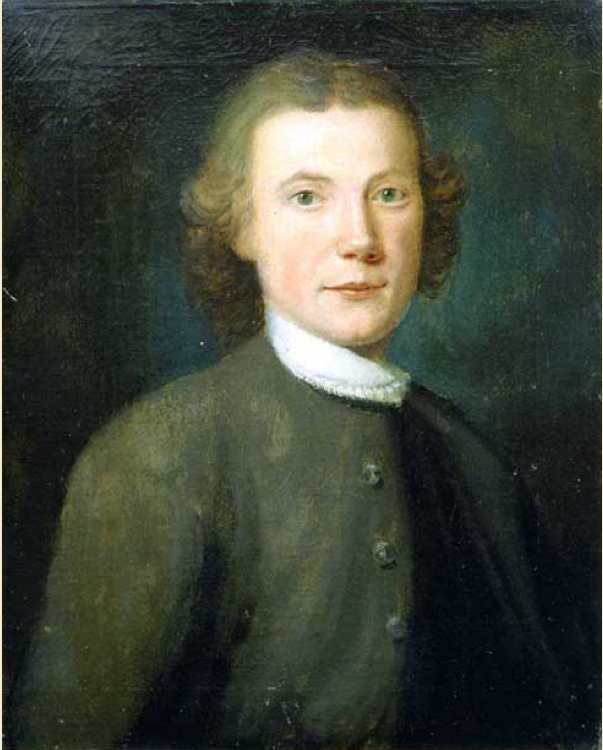
In 1772, John Ettwein and his group of some 200 Lenape and Mohican Christians traveled west along the Great Shamokin Path from their village of Friedenshütten (Cabins of Peace) near modern Wyalusing on the North Branch Susquehanna River to their new village of Friedensstadt (City of Peace) on the Beaver River in southwestern Pennsylvania.

=== Moravian expeditions ===
The Anderson Creek corridor is part of the Great Shamokin Path from the native village Shamokin, on the Susquehanna River, to Kittanning, Pennsylvania, on the Allegheny River. The Anderson Creek area was known by Native Americans as "the place where there is a mountain halfway on the other side". Native Americans recognized that Anderson Creek was the boundary between two river systems, the Susquehanna River and the Ohio River. For several decades in the early 18th century, the villages of Shamokin and Kittanning were two of the most important Native American villages in Pennsylvania. Perhaps the path's best known use was by Moravian Bishop John Ettwein and his group of some 200 Lenape and Mohican Christians in 1772. They traveled west along the path from their village of Friedenshütten (Cabins of Peace) near modern Wyalusing on the North Branch Susquehanna River to their new village of Friedensstadt on the Beaver River in southwestern Pennsylvania.

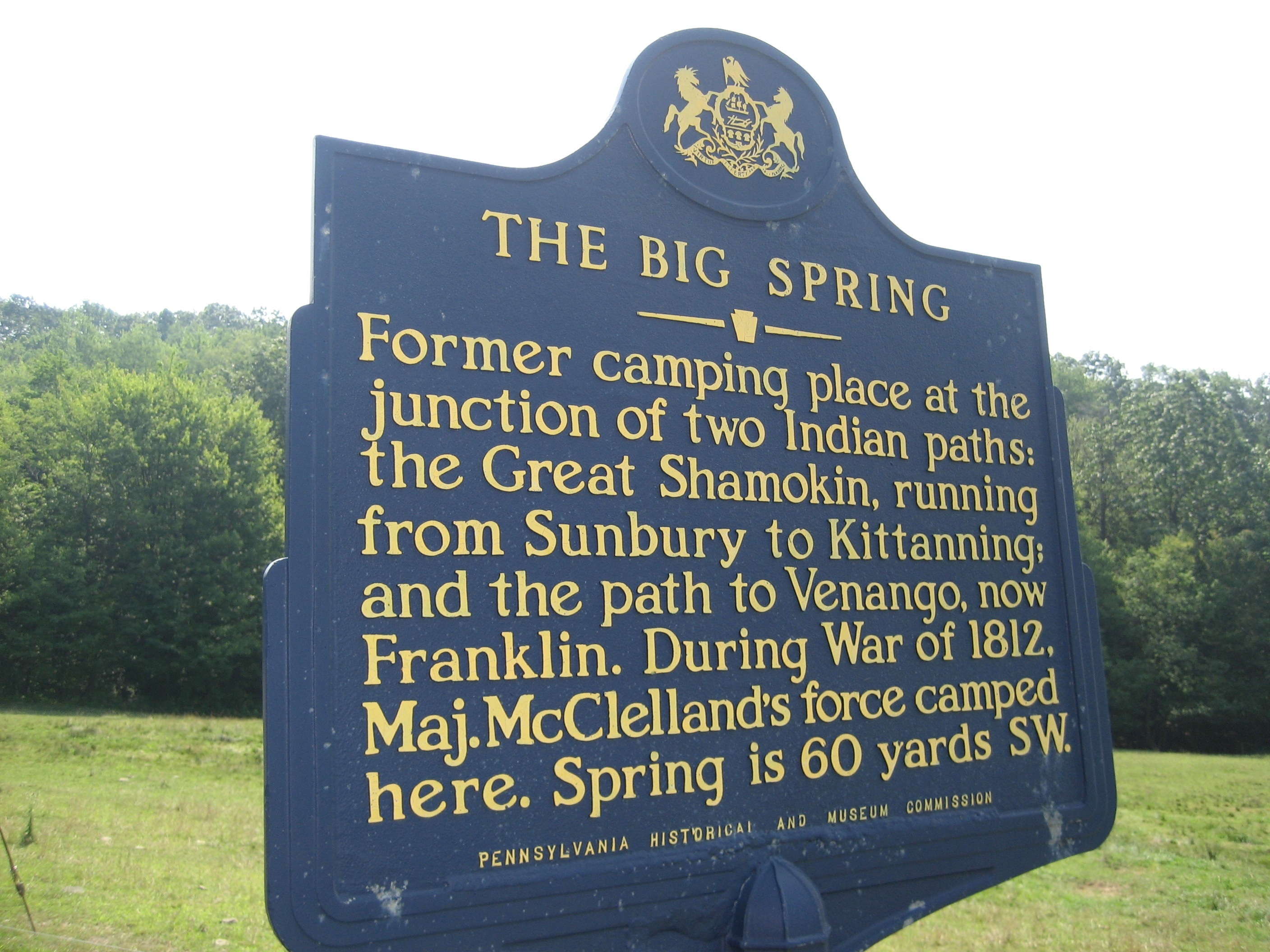
"The Big Spring" in Brady Township, Pennsylvania, was an important junction connecting the Great Shamokin Path and Goschgoschink Path.

The private travel diary of the Rev. Johann Roth, a Moravian Church missionary among the Indians in the American East, describes his journey along the Anderson Creek corridor in the summer of 1772. In this account of his day-by-day progress, the Rev. Roth mentions a number of Delaware (or Lenni Lenape) Indian names for Pennsylvania. Roth mentions a night camp in a region which the Indians called "Wachtschunglelawi awossijaje." These are really three words, Wachtschiink leldwi awossijaje: wachtsch[u], 'a hill, mountain'; -iink, locative suffix, 'place where'; leldwi, 'halfway, in the middle'; awossijaje, 'over, over there, beyond, on the other side, behind.' This makes the three words signify, 'place where there is a mountain halfway on the other side'; or, rather, 'where there is a mountain halfway between the one side and the other.' That is, 'a divide' between two river systems; in this case, between the Susquehanna River and the Ohio River.

=== The Mead brothers and French Creek ===
In his report to Governor Robert Dinwiddie, George Washington made reference to a beautiful rolling country, suitable for settlement, that he had found along the waters of French Creek. In 1788, brothers John and David Mead were ready to investigate Washington's story, and left Fort Augusta, now Sunbury, Pennsylvania, to explore the far west. They journeyed up mouth of Anderson Creek and turned at Coal Hill towards camp site and crossroads at The Big Spring. From there, they continued northwest on the Goschgoschink Path to the Venango Path and the waters of French Creek. On May 12, 1788, the Mead brothers founded Meadville, Pennsylvania, at the confluence of Cussewago Creek and French Creek.

=== War of 1812 ===
During the War of 1812, Major William McClelland departed Fort Loudoun, near Chambersburg, Pennsylvania, on March 4, 1814, and marched a division of troops numbering two hundred and twenty-one privates, three captains. five lieutenants and two ensigns along Anderson Creek to meet the Goschgoschink Path, later known as Mead's Path, at The Big Spring, Brady Township, Pennsylvania. These soldiers with their wagon train of equipment and cannon camped at Thunderbird Spring (Old State Road), just east of Kiwanis Trail, and near the Jefferson–Clearfield County Line. The march from Fort Loudoun to Erie took twenty-eight days. Major William McClelland's division relieved American forces at Lake Erie and later gave a good account of themselves at the Battle of Chippewa and Battle of Lundy's Lane.

== Underground Railroad ==
The various paths, river routes and safe waypoints that escaped slaves and their guides used in their journey northwards towards freedom are collectively known as the Underground Railroad. In western Pennsylvania, routes began at the Maryland–Pennsylvania border and traveled through Bedford, Pennsylvania, where the route split and converged at the Great Shamokin Path at the mouth of Anderson Creek. From there, the route led to The Big Spring near Luthersburg, Pennsylvania, and thence on Meade's Path to the Venango Path, Lake Erie and onward to Canada. Quaker settlers living along the Great Shamokin Path in Clearfield County did what they could to assist escaped slaves. The natural topography and terrain of the Eastern Continental Divide provided excellent cover and access to the zigzagging, sometimes backtracking, and myriad alternative routes that were needed to ensure the secrecy of the "Railroad."

== Anderson Creek corridor ==
The historic Anderson Creek corridor was later used for railroad passenger travel and commercial transportation of logs, coal and stone. Early settlers established logging mills and villages along Anderson Creek, and a railroad from Du Bois, Pennsylvania, to Curwensville, Pennsylvania, was completed in 1893. The settlement of Home Camp, Union Township, was once a thriving logging town with saw mills, splash dams and boarding houses for lumbermen. Water was sufficient for floating logs to the West Branch Susquehanna River. The last log drive on Anderson Creek was in 1901. The area is also rich in history from more recent times. During the Golden Age of railroading, passengers and freight rolled along this route, taking students to school and soldiers to war. Millions of tons of coal were pulled along this route, and stone quarried for bridges and buildings throughout the East. Clay was also extracted, with brickyards all along the tracks. Raftsmen plied the Susquehanna, riding logs to market hundreds of miles downstream. The resources help fuel the industrial might of the nation. This trail today is a resource as precious as the coal, timber, stone, and clay carried on the rails along this corridor. Recently, the Anderson Creek corridor has been considered as a venue for environmental and recreational tourism.

== The Bickford Railroad Line ==
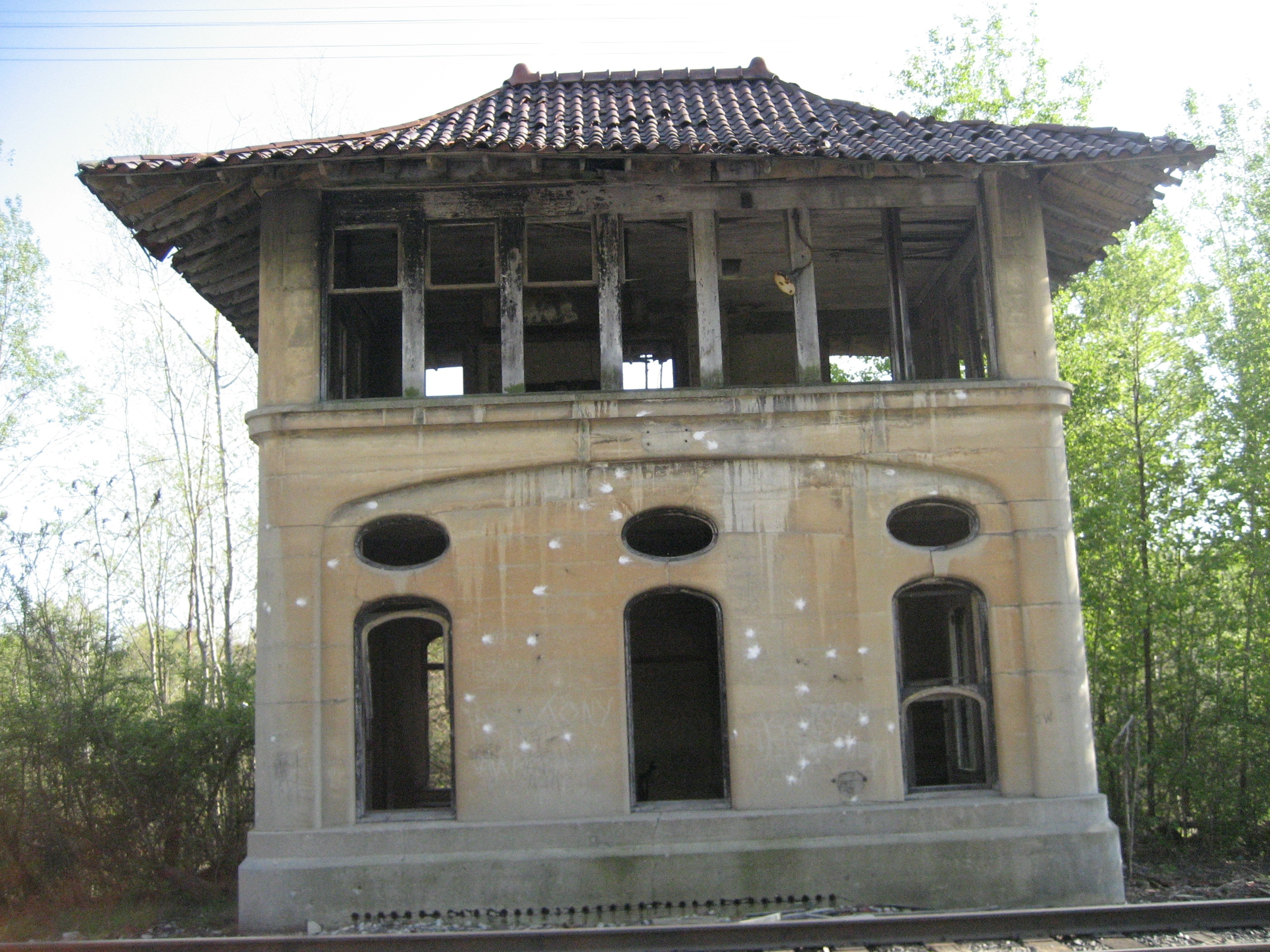
This pagoda styled railroad switching house at C. & M. Junction, Brady Township, Pennsylvania, was constructed in 1913 and sits abreast the Bickford Line of the former Clearfield & Mahoning Railroad Company.

In 1881, the shipping interests of the Buffalo, Rochester and Pittsburgh Railway became eager to have an eastern outlet and what is known as the Clearfield & Mahoning Railroad Company obtained a charter from the State and built a line from C. & M. Junction in Brady Township, Pennsylvania, by way of Luthersburg and Curwensville, to Clearfield, Pennsylvania. The first construction work was started in June 1892, and the first passenger train over this road was run on the first day of June 1893. The line is 17.4 miles long and is named after the Bickford junction west of Curwensville. The Bickford Line traveled along the Eastern Continental Divide bounding Anderson Creek from Rockton, Union Township, Pennsylvania, to the West Branch Susquehanna River at Bridgeport, Pennsylvania. The line is no longer active and the rails have been removed. The last passenger train ride on the Bickford Line from Du Bois to Clearfield was on June 15, 1954, and hundreds of local residents enjoyed the historic journey. The railroad tracks have been removed and the ownership of the right-of-way is uncertain. The old rail line is popular with ATV enthusiasts.

== Du Bois Reservoir ==
The Du Bois Reservoir in Union Township, Clearfield County, consists of 210 acres, has a listed capacity of 615 million gallons and is located near the headwaters of Anderson Creek. The reservoir is a PA DCNR Conservation Area and serves as the water supply for the City of Du Bois. The Du Bois Reservoir is also known as the Anderson Creek Reservoir. The dam at Du Bois Reservoir controls the flow of water from the headwaters of Anderson Creek.

== Village of Rockton ==
Rockton is a village in Union Township, Clearfield County, resting along Anderson Creek near Brown Springs in the Moshannon State Forest. Rockton gets its name from a time when the stagecoach came over the mountain from Clearfield with the mail, and passengers would argue about the weight of a large rock. Rockton had its own school, weekly newspaper, several stores, three churches, a number of mills, both grist and lumber, and an emergency landing field for air mail pilots. Farms did well in the shelter of the surrounding mountains.

Rockton was divided in two, upper and lower. What is known as Rockton today was begun through lumbering by people such as John Brubaker. In 1885, Jason E. Kirk and David W. Kirk built a steam-powered feed mill. Lower Rockton began in 1837 with a saw mill and grist mill built by Jason Kirk and Jeremiah Moore. It sits along Anderson Creek as did the wool mill of William Johnson. The Kirk mill was designed to provide adequate height and space at the front of the building for men and horse-drawn wagons to load and unload products.

Rockton once had rail service on the Bickford Line from Du Bois to Clearfield. The Buffalo, Rochester & Pittsburgh Rockton Station built in 1898 was dismantled in the 1970s and is now in Kane, Pennsylvania.

The greatest disaster for Rockton was a tornado on September 14, 1945, beginning in the Coal Hill area of Brady Township. Many buildings were destroyed with the Hollopeter Poultry Farm receiving most of the damage. The William Irwin house was moved several inches off of its foundation and a barn demolished. The storm cleared a path approximately 100 feet wide and eight miles long. After the storm crossed Anderson Creek and moved up Montgomery Run, it dispersed. No one was injured.

Today, Rockton has a post office, one church, St. John's Lutheran, an auto repair shop, and a fire department.

== David S. Ammerman Trail ==
Once known as the Clearfield and Grampian Trail, in 2011, the name was changed to the David S. Ammerman Trail in memory of the man who championed turning the abandoned rail corridor into a recreational trail. The David S. Ammerman Trail traverses Anderson Creek in Curwensville, Pennsylvania, and connects to Grampian, Pennsylvania, and Clearfield, Pennsylvania.

== Anderson Creek Watershed Association ==
The Anderson Creek Watershed Association has partnered projects with the Western Pennsylvania Conservancy Watershed Restoration Project. Clearfield County has more acreage affected by abandoned mines than any county in the state.

== See also ==
- List of Pennsylvania rivers
