= Armstrong School District (Pennsylvania) =

School district in Pennsylvania

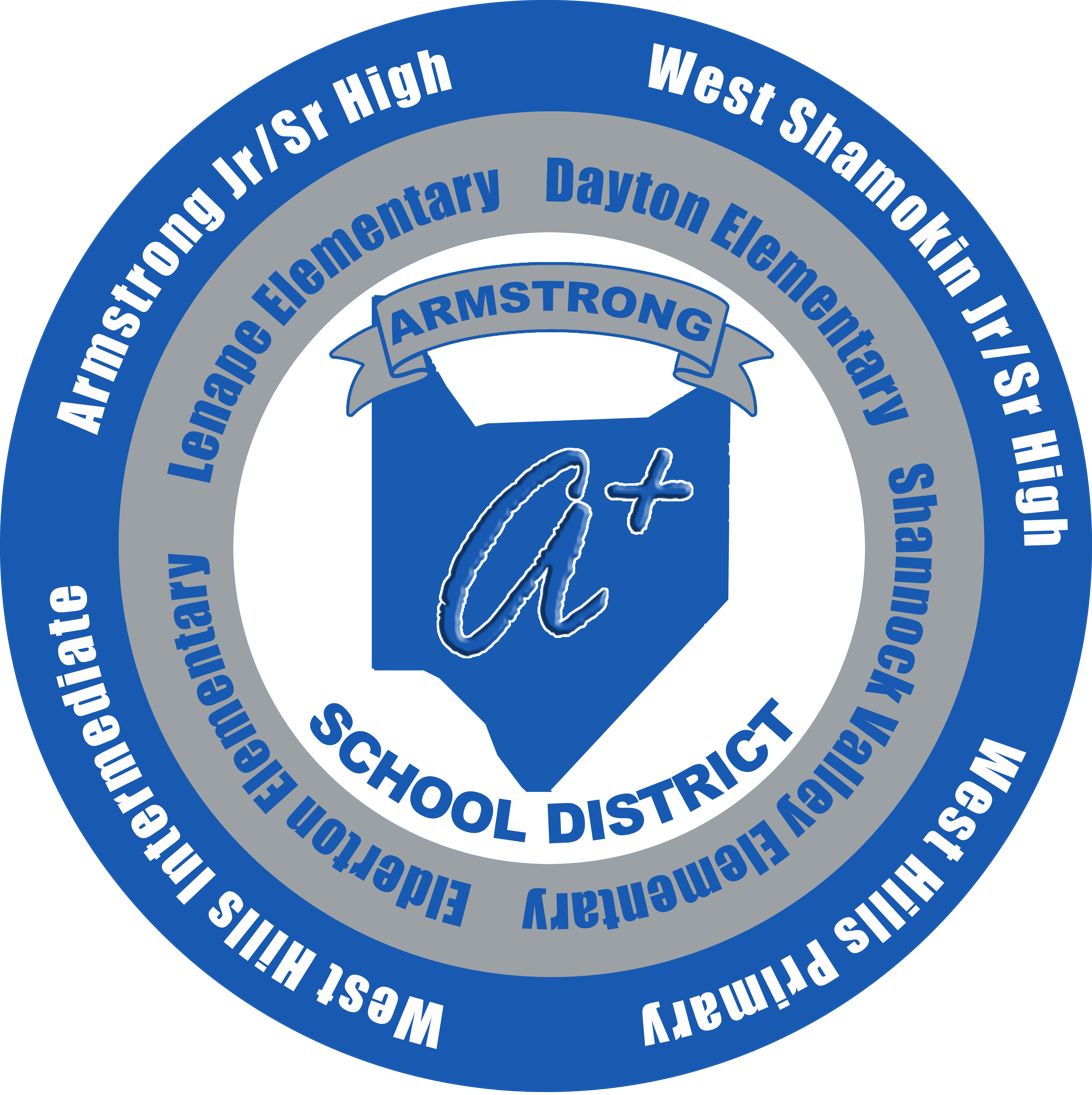

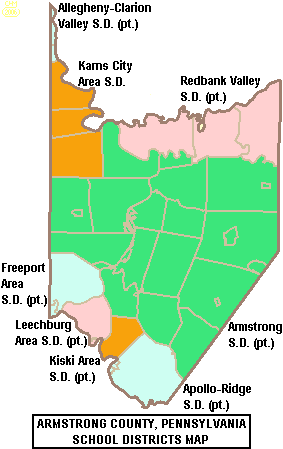
- Map of Armstrong County Pennsylvania School Districts

Address
- 181 Heritage Park Drive, Suite 2, Kittanning, Armstrong County, Pennsylvania, 16201; United States

District information
- Type: Public
- Motto: Working Together for Academic Excellence
- Grades: K-12
- Superintendent: Dr. Jason Perrin
- Asst. superintendent(s): Joshua Williams
- Business administrator: Sam Kirk
- School board: 9 members
- Chair of the board: Ashley McIntyre
- Governing agency: Pennsylvania Department of Education
- Schools: 8
- Budget: $109,124,652 (2023-2024)
- NCES District ID: 4202590
- District ID: PA-128030852

Students and staff
- Students: 4,676
- Teachers: 366.73 (on an FTE basis)
- Staff: 238.94 (on an FTE basis)
- Student–teacher ratio: 12.75:1

Other information
- Website: www.asd.k12.pa.us

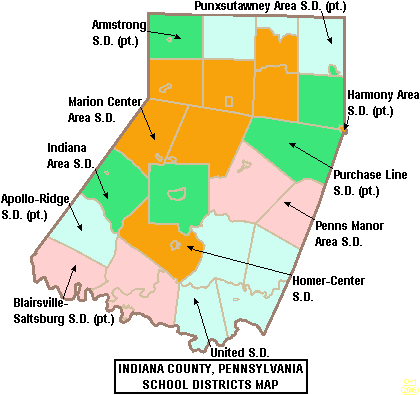
School District region in Indiana County

The Armstrong School District is a large, public school district which encompasses approximately 437 square miles (1,130 km^{2}). The district is one of the 500 public school districts of Pennsylvania. In Armstrong County, Pennsylvania, Armstrong School District covers the Boroughs of Applewold, Atwood, Dayton, Elderton, Ford City, Ford Cliff, Kittanning, Manorville, Rural Valley, West Kittanning and Worthington and the Townships of Bethel Township, Boggs Township, Burrell Township, Cadogan Township, Cowanshannock Township, East Franklin Township, Kittanning Township, Manor Township, North Buffalo Township, Pine Township, Plumcreek Township, Rayburn Township, South Bend Township, Valley Township, Washington Township, Wayne Township and West Franklin Township. In Indiana County, Pennsylvania, the district includes the Borough of Smicksburg and West Mahoning Township. According to 2000 federal census data, it served a resident population of 44,970. By 2010, the District's population had declined to 43,301 people. In 2009, Armstrong School District residents' per capita income was $15,449, while the median family income was $36,907.

In 2013, Armstrong School District operated ten public schools. A new junior-senior high school was completed in 2015. As such, two older high school buildings were closed. The district was established in 1966 when Pennsylvania consolidated several smaller school districts.

Today, the Armstrong School District operates 8 schools including:

2 High Schools (7-12): Armstrong Junior-Senior High School & West Shamokin Junior-Senior High School

1 Intermediate School: West Hills Intermediate School

5 Elementary Schools: Elderton Elementary School, Dayton Elementary School, Lenape Elementary School, West Hills Primary School, and Shannock Valley Elementary School.

High school students may also attend Lenape Technical School for vocational training. The ARIN Intermediate Unit IU28 provides the district with various services like specialized education for disabled students and hearing, speech and visual disability services, and professional development for staff and faculty.

== Schools ==
Elementary Schools

Dayton Elementary School - Kindergarten – grade 6
413 E Grant Ave., Dayton, PA 16222

Elderton Elementary School - Kindergarten – grade 6
239 South Lytle St., Elderton, PA 15736

Lenape Elementary School - Kindergarten – grade 6
2300 Center Ave., Ford City, PA 16226

Shannock Valley Elementary School - Kindergarten – grade 6
210 Cowanshannock Ave, Rural Valley, PA 16249

West Hills Primary School - Kindergarten – grade 3
181 Heritage Park Dr., Kittanning, PA 16201

Intermediate Schools

West Hills Intermediate School - grades 4–6
175 Heritage Park Dr., Kittanning, PA 16201

High Schools

Armstrong Junior/Senior High School - grades 7–12
300 Buffington Dr., Kittanning, PA, 16201

West Shamokin Jr./Sr. High School - grades 7–12
178 Wolf Dr, Rural Valley, PA 16249

=== Closed schools ===
In 2000, the Armstrong School Board closed several schools due to declining enrollment:

- Dayton Jr/Sr High School and Shannock Valley Jr/Sr High School.
- East Franklin Elementary School
- North Buffalo Elementary School
- Worthington High School (Closed 1980s)
- East Brady Jr/Sr High School (Closed, early 1990s, partially consolidated with Kittanning High School, other students sent to Karns City Jr/Sr High School in the Karns City School District)
- Elderton Jr/Sr High School Closed June 2012; see page for more information
- Kittanning Township Elementary School - students shifted to Lenape Elementary in Ford City (closed 2012)
- Kittanning Senior High School - Closed 2015
- Ford City Junior Senior High School - Closed 2015
- Kittanning Junior High School - Closed 2015
