= Brady Township, Clearfield County, Pennsylvania =

Township in Pennsylvania, US

Coordinates: 40°59′59″N 78°45′59″W

- Township
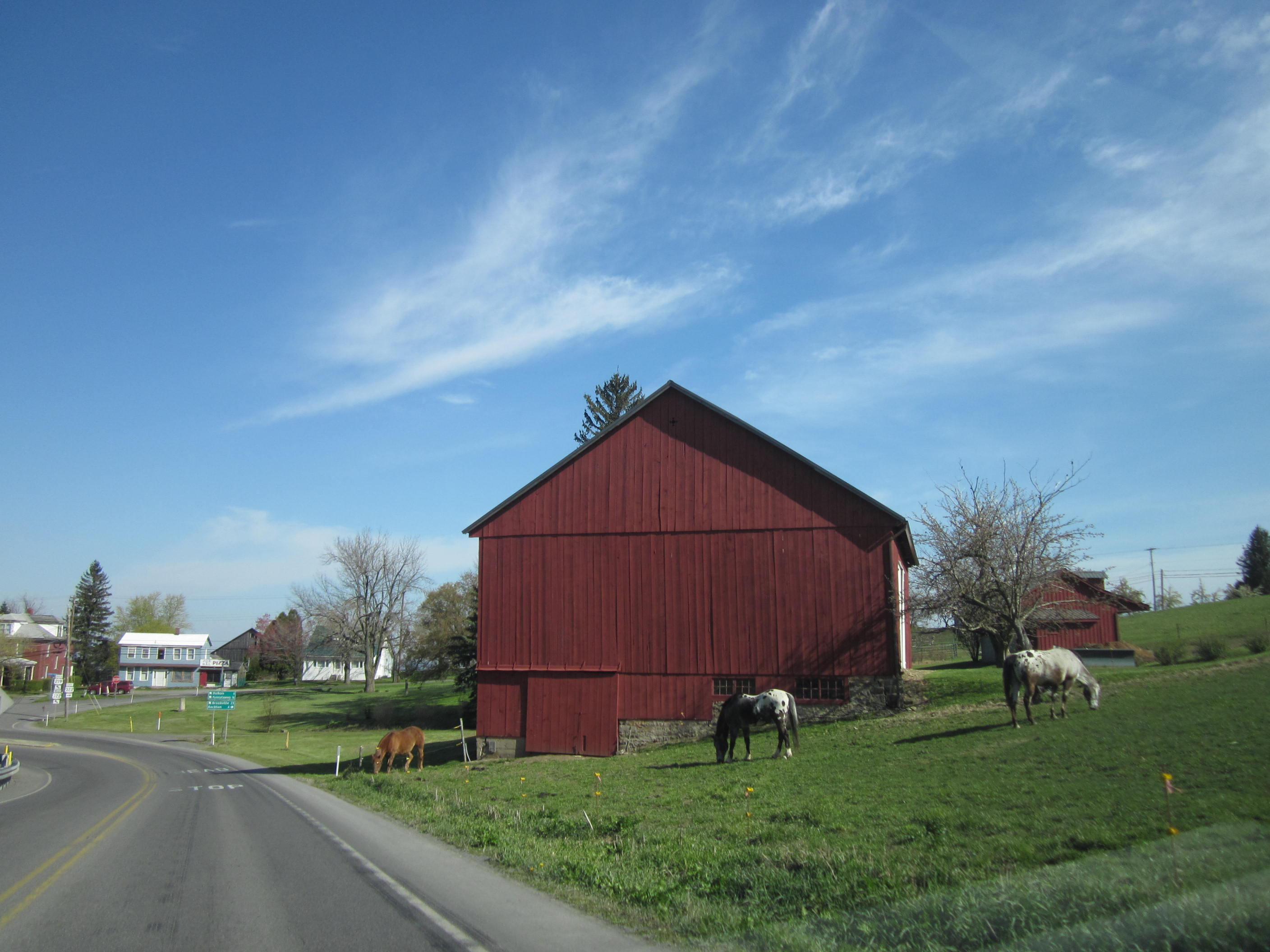
- a barn just outside Luthersburg in the township

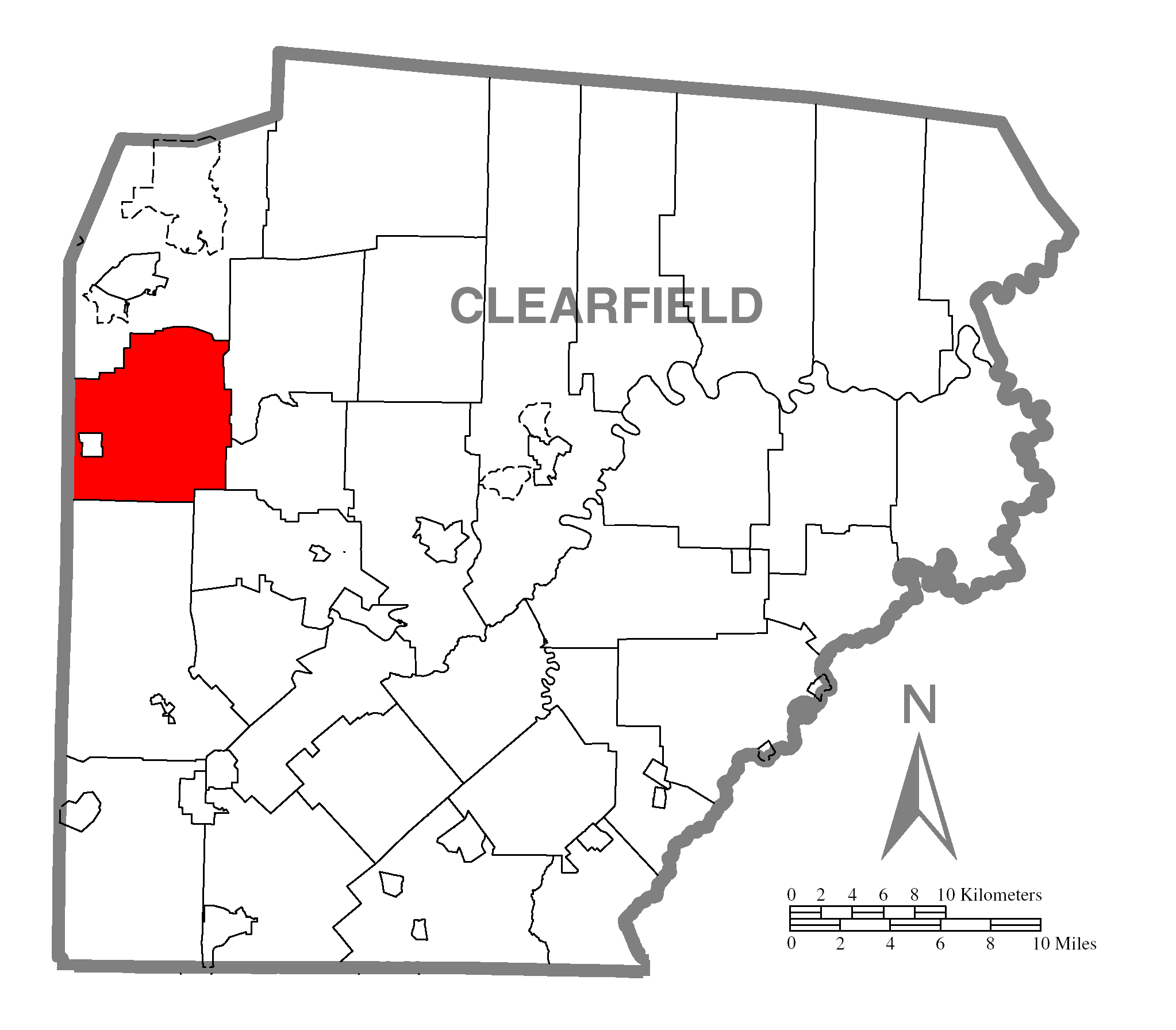
- Map of Clearfield County, Pennsylvania highlighting Brady Township

- Map of Clearfield County, Pennsylvania
- Country: United States
- State: Pennsylvania
- County: Clearfield
- Settled: 1785
- Incorporated: 1826

Area
  - Total: 37.37 sq mi (96.78 km^{2})
  - Land: 37.23 sq mi (96.43 km^{2})
  - Water: 0.14 sq mi (0.35 km^{2})

Population (2020)
  - Total: 1,941 ▼
  - Estimate (2022): 1,916 ▼
  - Density: 52.8/sq mi (20.37/km^{2})
- Time zone: UTC-5 (Eastern (EST))
  - Summer (DST): UTC-4 (EDT)
- Area code: 814
- FIPS code: 42-033-08120

Brady Township is a township in Clearfield County, Pennsylvania, United States. The population was 1,941 at the 2020 census.

== Geography ==
According to the United States Census Bureau, the township has a total area of 37.5 square miles (97 km^{2}), of which 37.4 square miles (97 km^{2}) is land and 0.04 square miles (0.10 km^{2}) (0.05%) is water.

== Communities ==
- Helvetia
- Luthersburg
- Salem
- Troutville

== Demographics ==
Historical population
Census	Pop.	Note	%±
1970	1,707		—
1980	1,998		17.0%
1990	2,023		1.3%
2000	2,010		−0.6%
2010	2,000		−0.5%
2020	1,941		−2.9%
2022 (est.)	1,916		−1.3%
U.S. Decennial Census

As of the census of 2000, there were 2,010 people, 742 households, and 577 families residing in the township. The population density was 53.7 inhabitants per square mile (20.7/km^{2}). There were 825 housing units at an average density of 22.0/sq mi (8.5/km^{2}). The racial makeup of the township was 99.15% White, 0.10% Native American, 0.05% Asian, and 0.70% from two or more races. Hispanic or Latino of any race were 0.30% of the population.

There were 742 households, out of which 33.6% had children under the age of 18 living with them, 67.1% were married couples living together, 6.1% had a female householder with no husband present, and 22.2% were non-families. 18.6% of all households were made up of individuals, and 9.2% had someone living alone who was 65 years of age or older. The average household size was 2.71 and the average family size was 3.10.

In the township the population distribution was 26.1% under the age of 18, 8.1% from 18 to 24, 28.1% from 25 to 44, 24.5% from 45 to 64, and 13.3% who were 65 years of age or older. The median age was 38 years. For every 100 females, there were 102.8 males. For every 100 females age 18 and over, there were 99.5 males.

The median income for a household in the township was $34,015, and the median income for a family was $38,405. Males had a median income of $29,167 versus $19,635 for females. The per capita income for the township was $15,298. About 9.6% of families and 14.1% of the population were below the poverty line, including 20.9% of those under age 18 and 7.9% of those age 65 or over.

== Education ==
Students in Brady Township attend schools in the DuBois Area School District.

== Amish country along the Great Shamokin Path ==
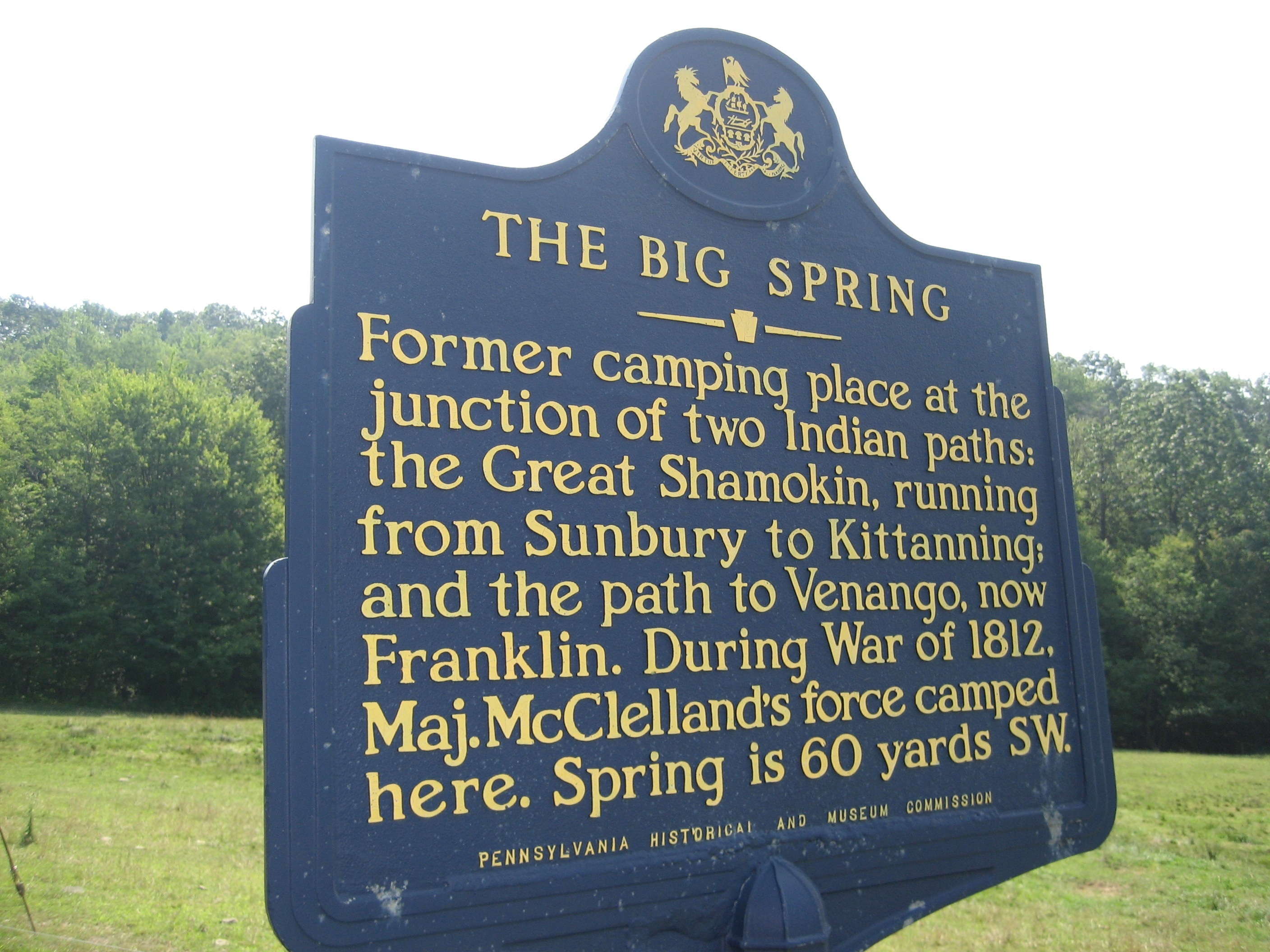
The Big Spring was an important junction connecting the Great Shamokin Path and Goschgoschink Path.

A corridor of Amish settlements developed in the 19th and 20th centuries roughly along the Great Shamokin Path as a means of travel and migration through Clearfield, Jefferson, Indiana and Armstrong counties, beginning at Big Spring near Luthersburg, Clearfield County, and ending in Rural Valley in Armstrong County. Amish settlements exist near the villages of Troutville in Clearfield County; Big Run, Cloe and Punxsutawney in Jefferson County; Smicksburg in Indiana County; and Rural Valley in Armstrong County. Amish buggies co-mingle with automobiles through the corridor. The Troutville Amish settlement in Brady Township, Clearfield County, is good-sized and has eight church districts. The settlement has farms, trades and small shops. Troutville was named for Jacob Trautwien who settled the area in 1832.

The Smicksburg Amish settlement is centered on the borough of Smicksburg, Indiana County, about 10 miles southwest of Punxsutawney. An example of a new community formed by migration, it is the third-largest Amish settlement in Pennsylvania, and the eleventh largest in the U.S. The Smicksburg settlement has 18 church districts and was founded in 1962. Amish here drive Midwestern-style black buggies. Smicksburg was founded in 1827 by the Reverend J. George Schmick. Most of the residents are Amish. The population was 46 at the 2010 census, and this is one of the smallest incorporated boroughs in Pennsylvania. The Smicksburg settlement has specialty shops featuring Amish wares of handcrafts, quilts, furniture, foods and eating establishments. Rural Valley is a borough in Armstrong County, Pennsylvania, where the Cowanshannock Creek flows west leading to the Allegheny River. The population was 876 at the 2010 census. The regional high school, West Shamokin High School, bears the name of the historic Great Shamokin Path.
