= Great Shamokin Path =

Historic trail in Pennsylvania

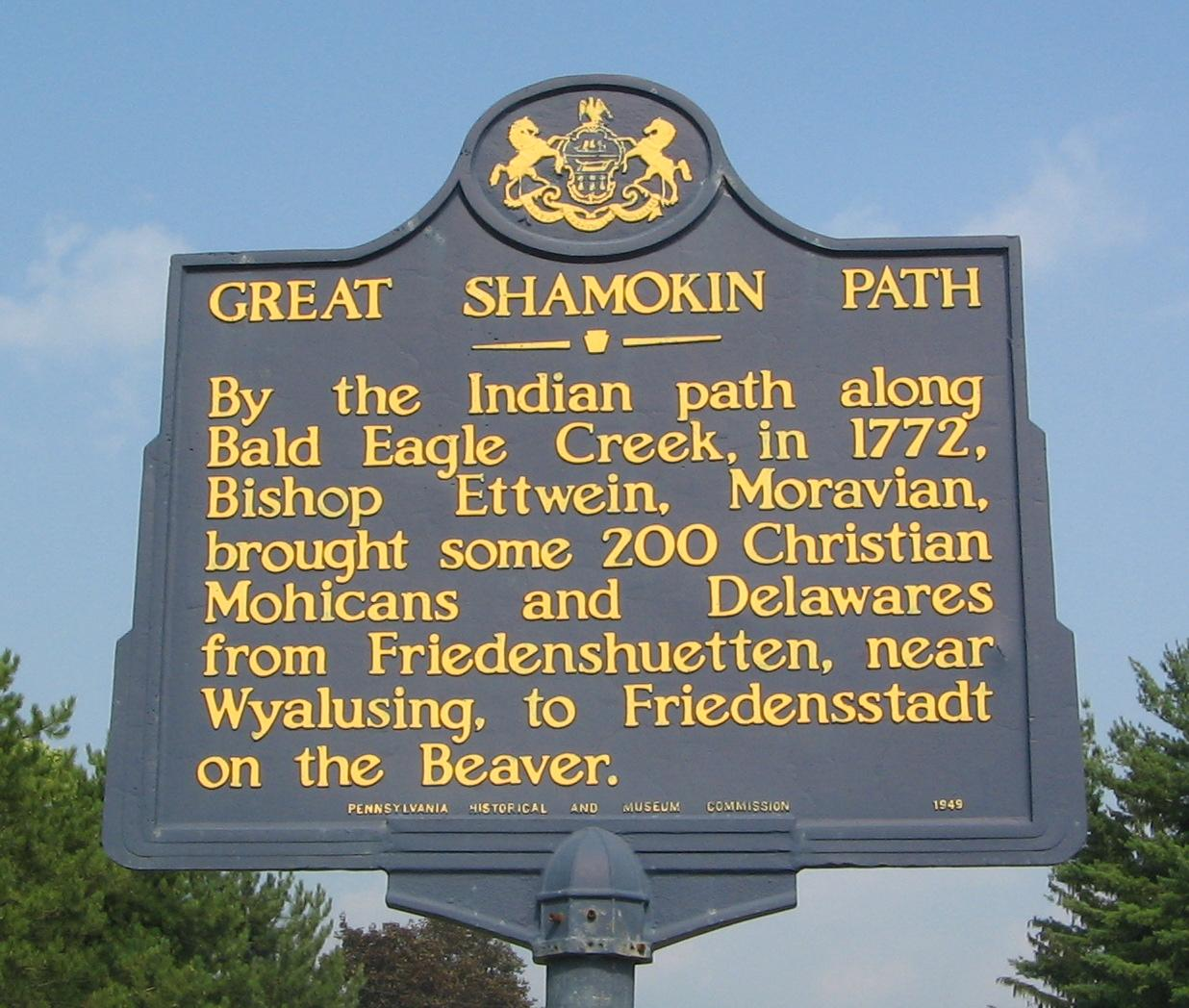
Great Shamokin Path Pennsylvania Historical Marker on Pennsylvania Route 150 west of Lock Haven

The Great Shamokin Path (also known as the Shamokin Path) was a major Native American trail in the U.S. State of Pennsylvania that ran from the native village of Shamokin (modern-day Sunbury) along the left bank of the West Branch Susquehanna River north and then west to the Great Island (near modern-day Lock Haven). There it left the river and continued further west to Chinklacamoose (what is now the borough of Clearfield) and finally Kittanning on the Allegheny River.

The Great Shamokin Path connected settlements along the Susquehanna River with those on the Allegheny River (and the Ohio River downstream of Kittanning). For several decades in the early 18th century, the villages of Shamokin and Kittanning were two of the most important Native American villages in Pennsylvania. The colonists recorded the path as used by Moravian Bishop Ettwein and his group of some 200 Lenape and Mohican Christians in 1772. They traveled west along the path from their village of Friedenshütten (Cabins of Peace) near modern Wyalusing on the North Branch of the Susquehanna to their new village of Friedensstadt (City of Peace) on the Beaver River in southwestern Pennsylvania.

Today a 4-mile (6.4 km) long rail trail in Armstrong County follows a short portion of the Great Shamokin Path, and the former course of the Rural Valley Railroad.

== Susquehanna to the Allegheny ==
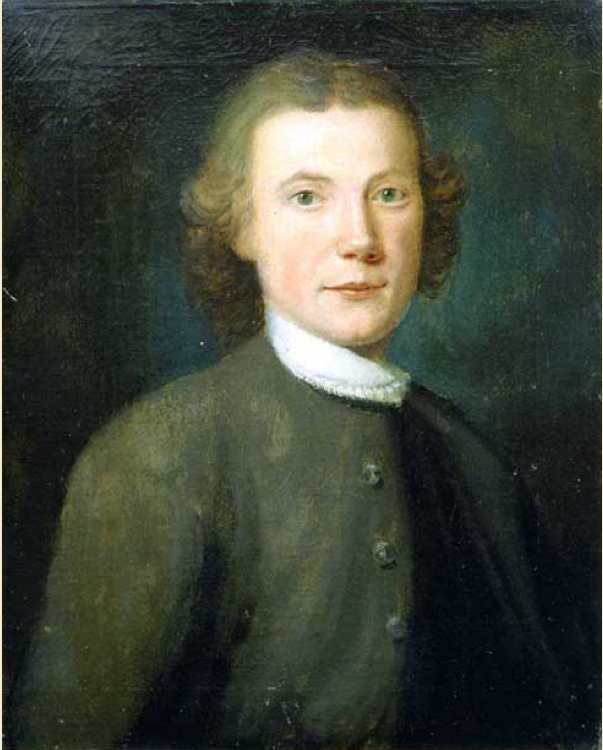
In 1772, John Ettwein and his group of some 200 Christian Lenape and Mohican traveled west along The Great Shamokin Path from their village of Friedenshütten (Cabins of Peace) near modern Wyalusing on the North Branch Susquehanna River to their new village of Friedensstadt (City of Peace) on the Beaver River in southwestern Pennsylvania.

The village of Shamokin was just south of the "forks of the Susquehanna", the confluence of the West Branch Susquehanna River with the Susquehanna River (also known as the North Branch). From there, the Great Shamokin Path headed north and forded the river (where current Northumberland developed), then went along the left (west) bank of the West Branch Susquehanna River to the Shawnee town of Chillisquaque on Chillisquaque Creek. The path continued north through what are now Milton and Watsontown, where the path forked into two branches, both leading to Canaserage on Muncy Creek (today Muncy).

At Canaserage the river and path turned west. At least two other paths led northeast: the Wyalusing Path (along Muncy Creek to Wyalusing); and the Towanda Path (to Towanda), both on the North Branch of the Susquehanna River.

The Great Shamokin Path led west to the village of Otstonwakin (now Montoursville) on Loyalsock Creek at the confluence with the West Branch of the Susquehanna, and upriver to French Margaret's Town (developed as western Williamsport) on Lycoming Creek. The Sheshequin Path led north along Lycoming Creek to Sheshequin (now Ulster) on the North Branch Susquhehanna River. Further west the path went through the village of Quenashawakee, forded Larrys Creek and Pine Creek and came to the Great Island (now just east of Lock Haven).

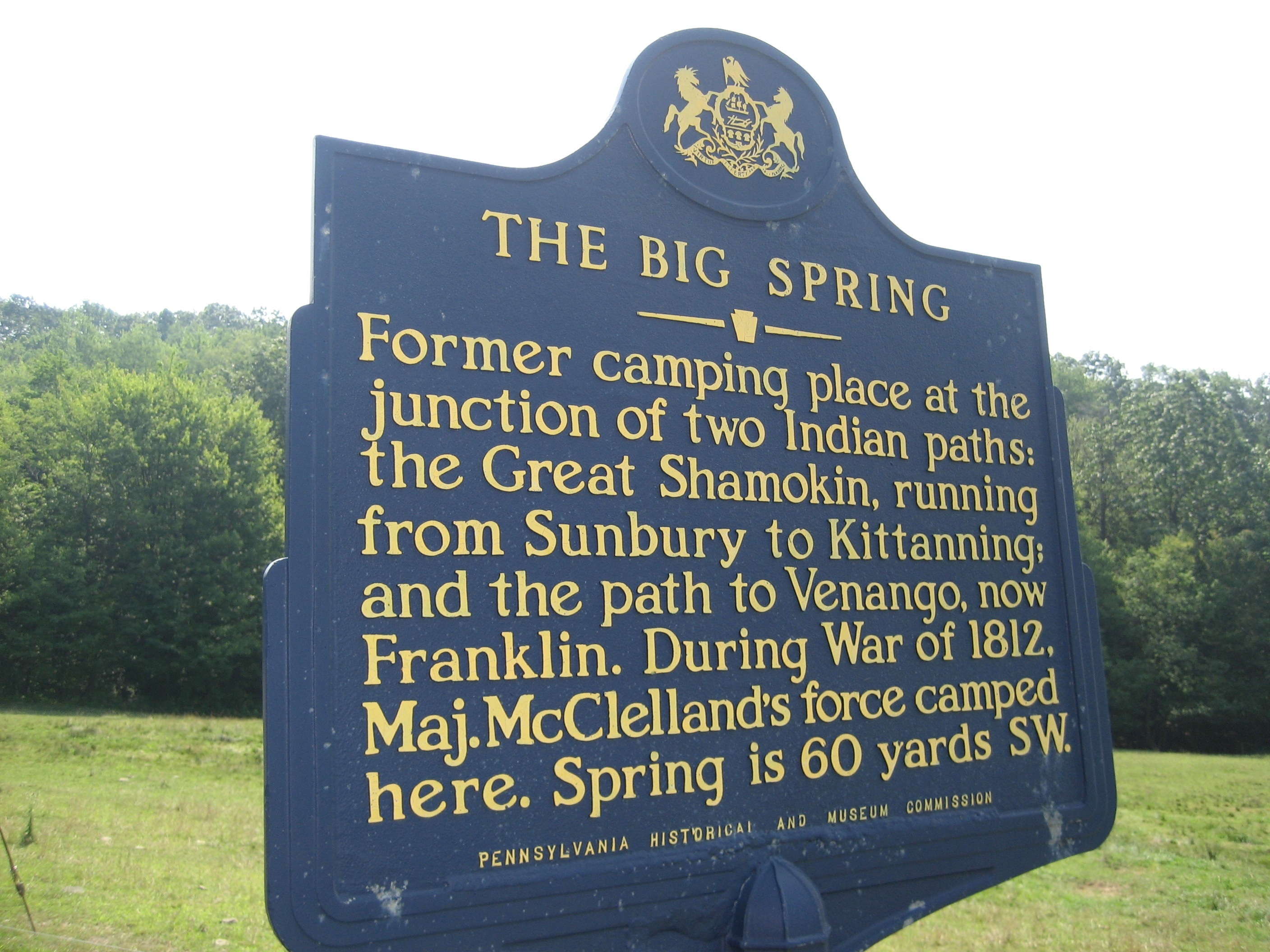
"The Big Spring" in Brady Township, Pennsylvania, was an important junction connecting the Great Shamokin Path and Goschgoschink Path.

The Great Island was an important crossroads with paths leading in many directions. The Great Shamokin Path left the river here (which turns north) to continue west along Bald Eagle Creek, fording Beech Creek and following Marsh Creek and Little Marsh Creek to its end. Then it climbed the Allegheny Front to modern-day Snow Shoe and on to Moshannon, where there were two branches possible to Kylertown. The branches differed in their fords of Black Moshannon Creek and Moshannon Creek, both of which were difficult to cross. From Kylertown the path continued west, fording Clearfield Creek before reaching Chinklacamoose (now Clearfield).

At Chinklacamoose the Great Shamokin Path rejoined the West Branch Susquehanna River and followed it west seven miles (11 km) to Curwensville, Pennsylvania and Anderson Creek. Several crossings of the Susquehanna were needed to avoid thickets of mountain laurel bushes here. The path followed Anderson Creek Gorge a few miles, left it to go west to what is now Chestnut Grove, and then on to The Big Spring, near Luthersburg, Brady Township, Clearfield County, Pennsylvania.

== Fort Augusta ==
Fort Augusta was a stronghold in Northumberland County, Pennsylvania, in the upper Susquehanna Valley from the time of the French and Indian War to the close of the American Revolution. The fort was erected by Col. William Clapham in 1756 at a site now within the limits of the city of Sunbury, in an area the Indians called "Shamokin." It was first constructed as part of the British defense against the raids of the French and Indians from the upper Allegheny region. Later, it served as a rebel American fortress during the American Revolution to aid in protecting settlers of the upper Susquehanna from Britain's Indian allies to the north. Named for Augusta of Saxe-Gotha, the mother of King George III, Fort Augusta was the largest of the Provincial forts. It was dismantled in 1794 after the United States gained independence.

During the French and Indian War in 1757–1758, several hundred French and Indian troops traveled the Great Shamokin Path in an effort to destroy Fort Augusta, the main stronghold of the English at the junction of the East and West branches of the Susquehanna River. This army was gathered from the French posts at Duquesne, Kittanning, Venango and Le Boeuf and assembled at the mouth of Anderson Creek. They constructed crude boats, rafts and bateau for passage down the Susquehanna River for the proposed attack. They dragged along with them two small brass cannon, but after reconnoitering, found the distance too great for the guns to shoot from the hill opposite the fort. The defense at Fort Augusta was strong enough to resist attack by storming or by siege, and the French attack was abandoned. A British defeat at Fort Augusta may have altered the history of the course of the French and Indian War.

In the 21st century on the site of the old Fort, the Northumberland County Historical Society has its headquarters in the "Hunter House Museum." The museum contains historical and archaeological artifacts dealing with Fort Augusta and items of local history. It maintains a genealogical library of material on early families in Northumberland County and surrounding counties. The museum is located at 1150 North Front Street, Sunbury, Pennsylvania. Fort Augusta's underground powder magazine still exists.

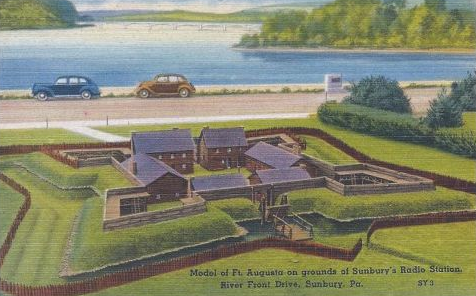
Model of Ft. Augusta, 1939

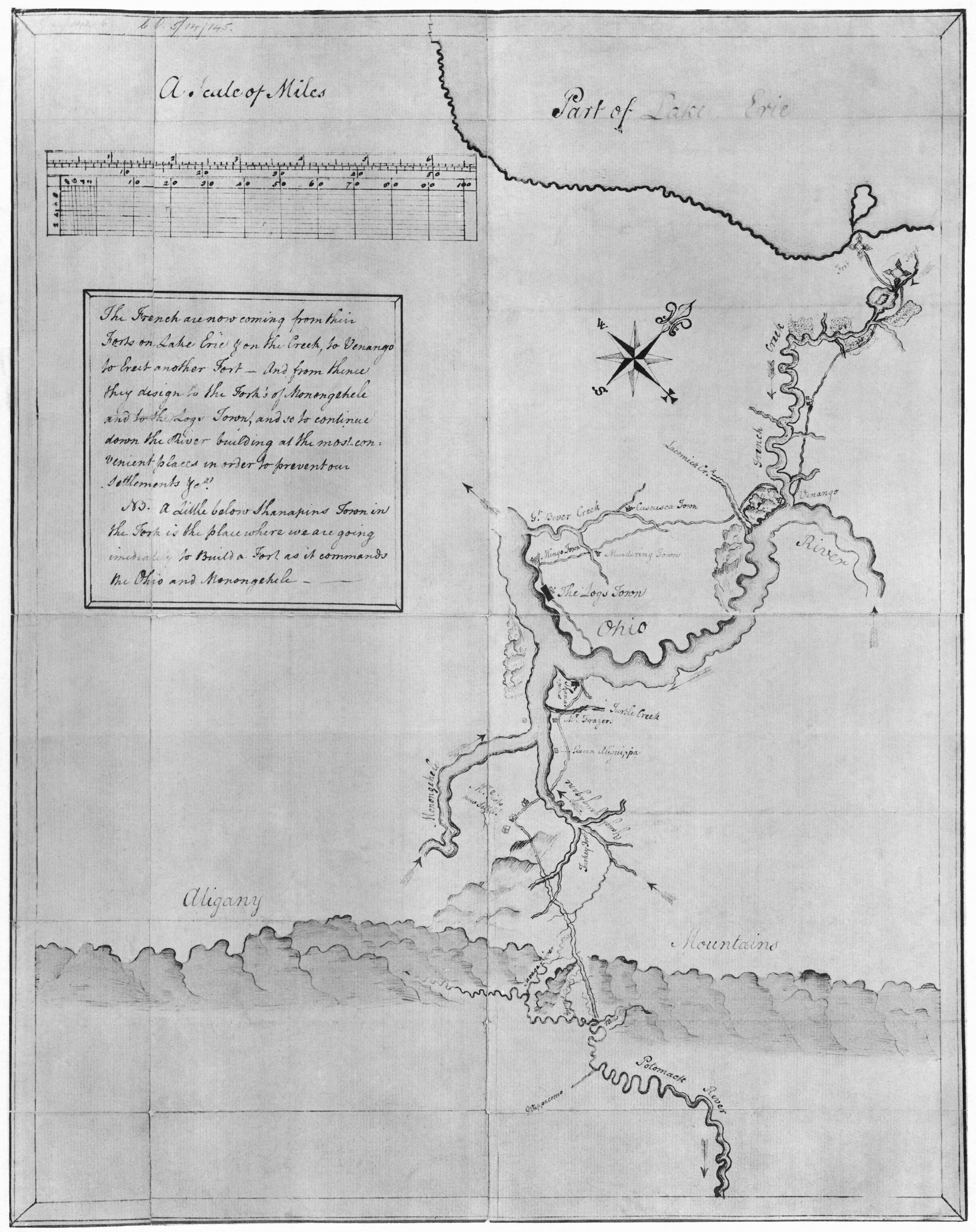
George Washington's map of French forts along the Allegheny River. French and Indian troops assembled at the mouth of Anderson Creek before the assault on Fort Augusta.

== Big Spring ==
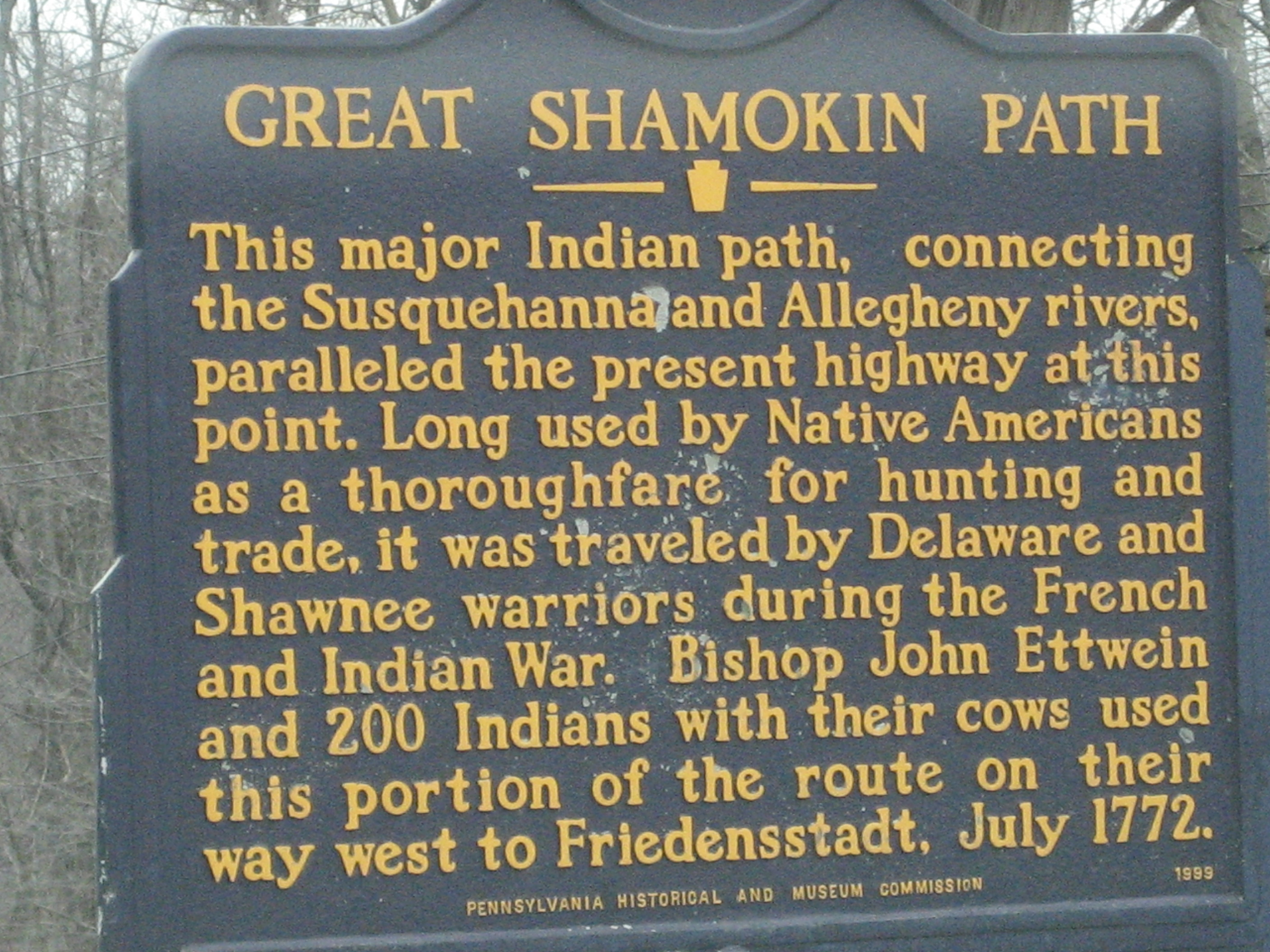
Marker location U.S. 119, 4 miles NE of Punxsutawney, Jefferson County, PA

The Big Spring near Luthersburg, Brady Township, Clearfield County, Pennsylvania, was an important camp site and trail hub. Here, the Goschgoschink Path, later known as Mead's Path, turned northwest to the Venango Path, Lake Erie and Canada. The Great Shamokin Path continued through Troutville and followed tributaries of Mahoning Creek to Punxsutawney. From Punxsutawney, the trail followed Cowanshannock Creek to Smicksburg, Rural Valley, Kittanning and the Allegheny River. During the War of 1812, Major William McCelland departed Fort Loudoun, near Chambersburg, Pennsylvania, on March 4, 1814, and marched a division of troops numbering 221 privates, three captains. five lieutenants and two ensigns along Anderson Creek to meet the Goschgoschink Path at the Big Spring. McClelland's division relieved American forces at Lake Erie and later fought well at the Battle of Chippewa and Battle of Lundy's Lane.

== Amish country along the Great Shamokin Path ==
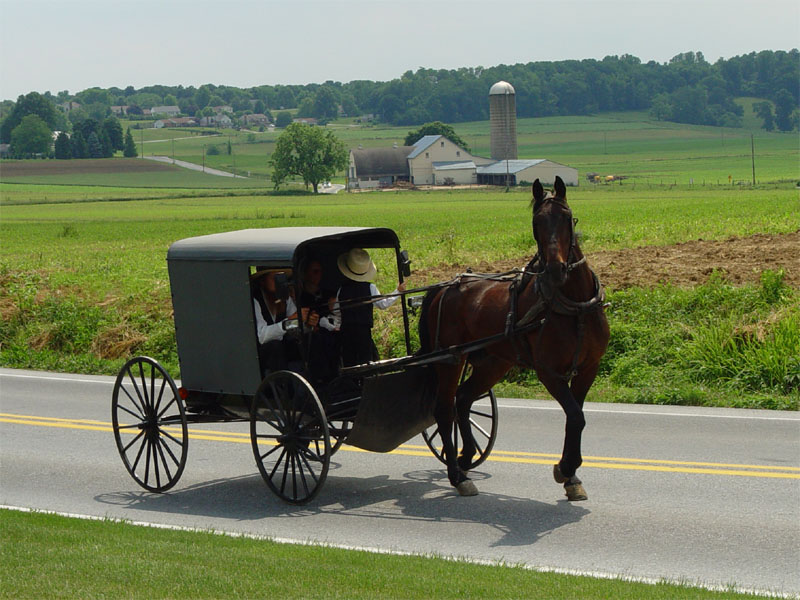
Amish buggy

An Amish heritage corridor extends generally along the Great Shamokin Path through Clearfield, Jefferson, Indiana and Armstrong counties, beginning at Big Spring near Luthersburg, Clearfield County, and ending in Rural Valley in Armstrong County. The corridor winds through Amish settlements near the villages of Troutville in Clearfield County; Big Run, Cloe and Punxsutawney in Jefferson County; Smicksburg in Indiana County; and Rural Valley in Armstrong County. Amish buggies co-mingle with automobiles through the corridor. The Troutville Amish settlement in Brady Township, Clearfield County, is good-sized and has eight congregations. The settlement has farms, trades and small shops. Troutville was named for Jacob Trautwien who settled the area in 1832.

The Smicksburg Amish settlement is centered on the borough of Smicksburg, Indiana County, about 10 miles southwest of Punxsutawney. The Smicksburg settlement is the third-largest Amish settlement in Pennsylvania, and the eleventh largest in the U.S. The Smicksburg settlement has 18 church districts and was founded in 1962. Amish here drive Midwestern-style black buggies. Smicksburg was founded in 1827 by the Reverend J. George Schmick, and most of the citizens are Amish. The population was 46 at the 2010 census, and is one of the smallest incorporated boroughs in Pennsylvania. The Smicksburg settlement has specialty shops with Amish wares of handcrafts, quilts, furniture, foods and eating establishments.

Rural Valley is a borough in Armstrong County, Pennsylvania, where the Cowanshannock Creek flows west leading to the Allegheny River. The population was 876 at the 2010 census. The regional high school, West Shamokin High School, bears the name of the historic Great Shamokin Path.
