= Smicksburg, Pennsylvania =

Borough in Pennsylvania, US

- Borough
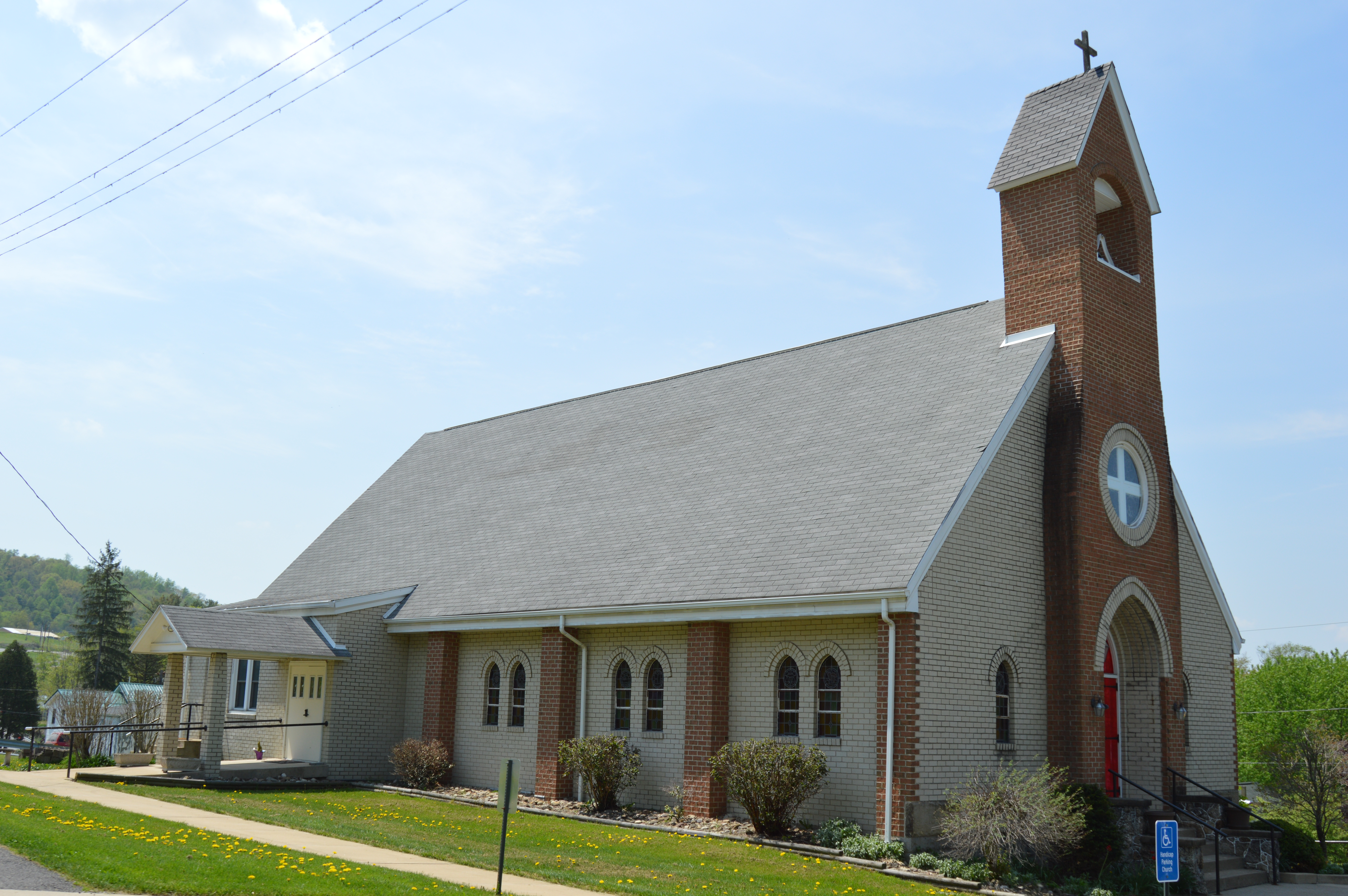
- Salem Lutheran Church on Clarion Street

- Location of Smicksburg in Indiana County, Pennsylvania.

- Location within Pennsylvania Location within the United States
- Coordinates: 40°52′07″N 79°10′13″W
- Country: United States
- State: Pennsylvania
- County: Indiana
- Settled: 1827
- Incorporated: 1854

Government
  - Type: Borough Council

Area
  - Total: 0.15 sq mi (0.38 km^{2})
  - Land: 0.15 sq mi (0.38 km^{2})
  - Water: 0 sq mi (0.00 km^{2})

Population (2020)
  - Total: 57 ▲
  - Estimate (2021): 56
  - Density: 294.6/sq mi (113.73/km^{2})
- Time zone: UTC-5 (Eastern (EST))
  - Summer (DST): UTC-4 (EDT)
- Zip code: 16256
- Area code: 814
- FIPS code: 42-71256

Smicksburg is a borough in Indiana County, Pennsylvania, United States. The population was 57 at the 2020 census, and it is one of the smallest incorporated boroughs in Pennsylvania. It was founded by the Reverend J. George Schmick.

== Geography ==
Smicksburg is located at 40°52′7″N 79°10′13″W (40.868715, -79.170415).

According to the United States Census Bureau, the borough has a total area of 0.1 square miles (0.26 km^{2}), all land.

== Demographics ==
Historical population
| Census | Pop. | Note | %± |
|---|---|---|---|
| 1860 | 134 | | — |
| 1870 | 143 | | 6.7% |
| 1880 | 221 | | 54.5% |
| 1890 | 229 | | 3.6% |
| 1900 | 237 | | 3.5% |
| 1910 | 230 | | −3.0% |
| 1920 | 224 | | −2.6% |
| 1930 | 184 | | −17.9% |
| 1940 | 223 | | 21.2% |
| 1950 | 92 | | −58.7% |
| 1960 | 80 | | −13.0% |
| 1970 | 79 | | −1.2% |
| 1980 | 82 | | 3.8% |
| 1990 | 76 | | −7.3% |
| 2000 | 49 | | −35.5% |
| 2010 | 46 | | −6.1% |
| 2020 | 56 | | 21.7% |
| 2021 (est.) | 56 | Steady | 0.0% |

As of the census of 2000, there were 49 people, 25 households, and 14 families residing in the borough. The population density was 362.5 inhabitants per square mile (140.0/km^{2}). There were 28 housing units at an average density of 207.1 per square mile (80.0/km^{2}). The racial makeup of the borough was 100% White.

There were 25 households, out of which 16% had children under the age of 18 living with them, 40% were married couples living together, 8% had a female householder with no husband present, and 44% were non-families. 40% of all households were made up of individuals, and 24% had someone living alone who was 65 years of age or older. The average household size was 1.96 and the average family size was 2.50.

In the borough the population was spread out, with 16.3% under the age of 18, 6.1% from 18 to 24, 28.6% from 25 to 44, 22.4% from 45 to 64, and 26.5% who were 65 years of age or older. The median age was 44 years. For every 100 females there were 96 males. For every 100 females age 18 and over, there were 95.2 males.

The median income for a household in the borough was $26,875, and the median income for a family was $37,500. Males had a median income of $26,750 versus $25,625 for females. The per capita income for the borough was $14,502. There were 20.0% of families and 20.7% of the population living below the poverty line, including 45.5% of under eighteens and 20.0% of those over 64.

== Amish Country along the Great Shamokin Path ==
An Amish heritage corridor extends generally along the Great Shamokin Path through Clearfield, Jefferson, Indiana and Armstrong counties, beginning at Big Spring near Luthersburg, Clearfield County, and ending in Rural Valley in Armstrong County. The corridor winds through Amish settlements near the villages of Troutville in Clearfield County; Big Run, Cloe and Punxsutawney in Jefferson County; Smicksburg in Indiana County; and Rural Valley in Armstrong County. Amish buggies co-mingle with automobiles through the corridor. The Troutville Amish settlement in Brady Township, Clearfield County, is good-sized and has eight church districts. The settlement has farms, trades and small shops. Troutville was named for Jacob Trautwien who settled the area in 1832. The Smicksburg Amish settlement is centered on the borough of Smicksburg, Indiana County, about 10 miles southwest of Punxsutawney. The Smicksburg settlement is the third largest in Pennsylvania, and the eleventh largest in the U.S. The Smicksburg settlement has 18 church districts and was founded in 1962. Amish here drive Midwestern-style black buggies. Smicksburg was founded in 1827 by the Reverend John George Schmick, and most of the area's citizens are Amish. However, there are no Amish families living in Smicksburg borough. The Smicksburg settlement has speciality shops with Amish wares of handcrafts, quilts, furniture, foods and eating establishments. Rural Valley is a borough in Armstrong County, Pennsylvania, where the Cowanshannock Creek flows west leading to the Allegheny River. The population was 876 at the 2010 census. The regional high school, West Shamokin High School, bears the name of the historic Great Shamokin Path.
