= Jess Heiges =

American football coach and college administrator

Biographical details
- Born: October 6, 1871; Luthersburg, Pennsylvania, U.S.
- Died: January 17, 1955 (aged 83); Norristown, Pennsylvania, U.S.

Coaching career (HC unless noted)
- 1894: Shippensburg

Jesse Shearer Heiges (October 6, 1871 – January 17, 1955) was an American college football coach and college administrator. He served as the head football coach at Shippensburg University of Pennsylvania—then known as Shippensburg Normal College—in 1894. He was also the school's first dean of instruction, from 1901 to 1934.
