= Craigsville, Pennsylvania =

Unincorporated community in Pennsylvania, US

- Unincorporated community
- Location within Pennsylvania
- Coordinates: 40°51′08″N 79°38′58″W
- Country: United States
- State: Pennsylvania
- County: Armstrong
- Township: West Franklin
- Elevation: 1,010 ft (310 m)
- Time zone: UTC-5 (Eastern (EST))
  - Summer (DST): UTC-4 (EDT)
- Area code: 724
- GNIS feature ID: 1172609

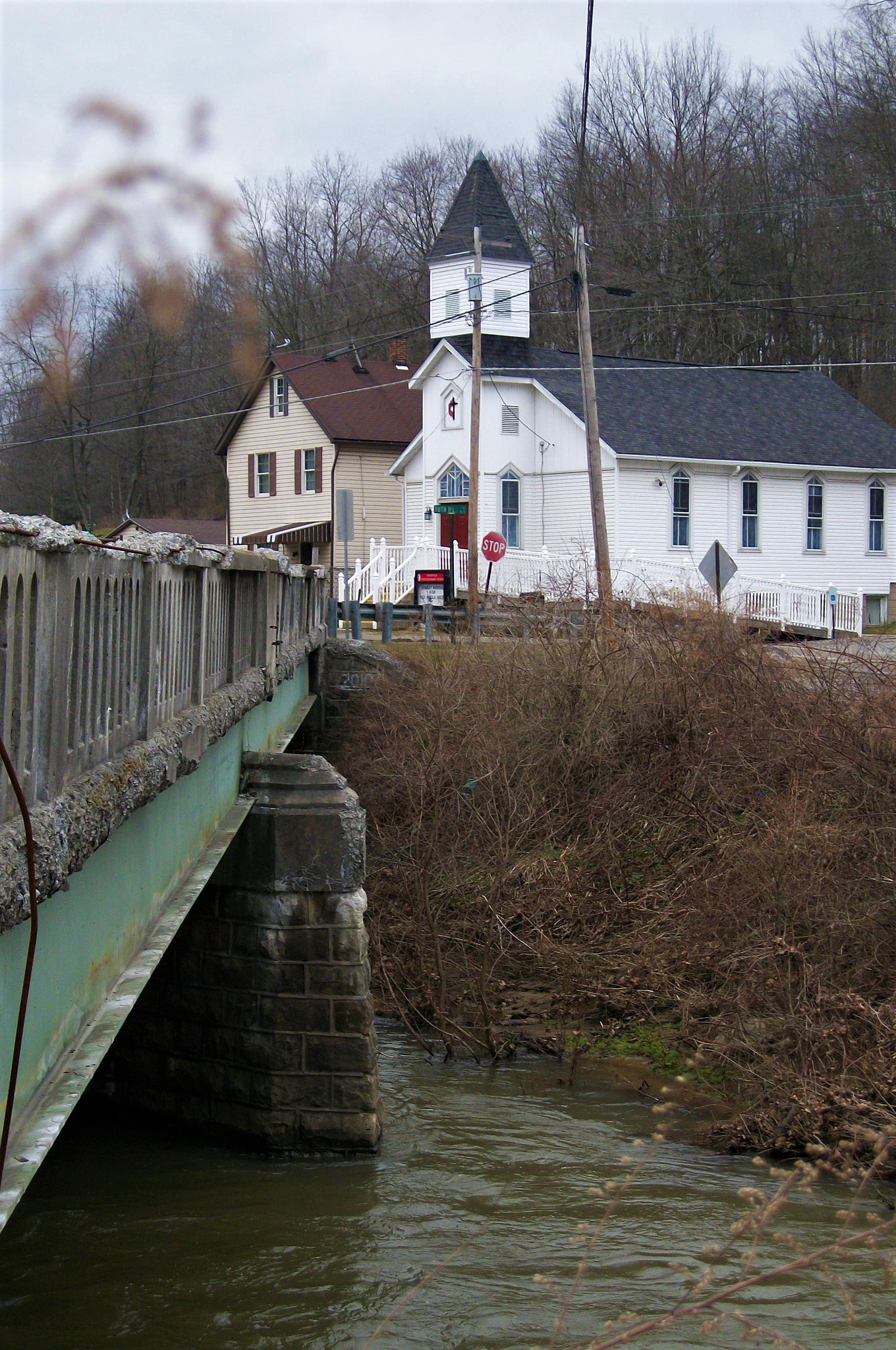
Craigsville United Methodist Church, established in 1884, sits across from Buffalo Creek.

Craigsville is an unincorporated community in West Franklin Township Armstrong County, Pennsylvania, United States. The community is 7.1 miles (11.4 km) west-northwest of the county seat, Kittanning.

== History ==
In 1793, William Stephenson and Aaron Wor (from whose name nearby Worthington may have been derived) settled a tract of land just north of the forks of Big and Little Buffalo Creeks. John Craig was the holder of the tract, and in 1805 his son Samuel established a fulling mill on the banks of Buffalo Creek. In 1814, he erected a carding roll. In 1835, partnering with his brother John and a man named Robert Cooper, he began to manufacture flannels, blankets and woolen goods. In 1843, the building was burned but was rebuilt soon after. In 1856, the firm consisted of the Craigs and William F. Rumberger, under the firm name of Craig and Rumberger.

Until 1843 the town was known as Craigtown, and it became known afterwards as Craigsville. The first child born within its limits was born March 30, 1809. The flouring mill, which was later a part of the woolen mill plant, about thirteen rods below the woolen factory, on the right bank of the creek, was erected by John Craig, Jr., Joseph T. McCurdy and Samuel S. Wallace, early in 1849, and was a three-story frame structure. In 1871, John Craig died suddenly soon after breakfast one morning from neuralgia of the heart. His heirs conveyed the undivided two-thirds of the mill property to McCurdy and Joseph Minteer, May 14, 1872, for $2,000. The flouring mill was closed in 1905 and the building was taken over by the woolen mill to allow for necessary expansion.

The Craigsville post office was established here on November 23, 1869, with William F. Rumberger, serving as the first post master. The Craigsville post office operated until June 15, 1986. It merged with the Worthington post office on August 19, 1989, zip code 16262. The final postmaster was Mrs. Nell Swigart. The new schoolhouse, in lieu of No. 14 before the division of Franklin township, is situated on the public road on the lower or right-hand side of the creek, approximately 100 rods below the grist mill.

The first separate assessment of Craigsville was made in 1876 and gave 25 taxables: one physician, three clerks, one boss carder, two boss weavers, one laborer, one helper, one dyer, one wool sorter, one picker, two teamsters, one spinner, one blacksmith, one wagonmaker, one miller, and one weaver.

A store was opened near the mills in 1860 by Samuel S. Wallace, John C. Wallace, and John Craig, afterward being sold in 1872 to Christopher Leard & Sons. Later, it was owned by J. W. Minteer, who also was postmaster.

In 1884, the Craigsville United Methodist Church was constructed on its present site. It had relocated from its previous site in Worthington borough, where it held services from 1849-1884. The first pastor of the Worthington Methodist Episcopal Church was Rev. Cooper. Membership in 1876 was around 80. Rev. Michael Coats succeeded Rev. Donovan Daniels as the present minister, and the church had approximately 60 members as of 2021.

The Craigsville Elementary School was also erected around 1884.

The village in 1913 had a population of two hundred eighty, most of whom were dependent on the woolen mills for employment, and consisted of thirty-five houses, a school, a church, and two stores.

In 1913 the Buffalo, Rochester and Pittsburgh Railroad (later the Baltimore and Ohio) extended their tracks two miles, almost parallel with Big Buffalo Creek, where the Pittsburgh Limestone Corporation, a subsidiary of the U.S. Steel Corporation, opened a large limestone mine. The capacity of this mine was approximately fifteen hundred tons, later increased to approximately thirty-five hundred tons daily. The major portion of their product went to the blast furnaces in the Pittsburgh district and the remainder generally was used for the manufacture of cement and stone for highway construction.

Graff-Kittanning Clay Products Company was incorporated in 1924, and construction was begun at the Craigsville site in that year. In 1925 production was started and has continued without interruption until the present date. In 1945 the Worthington Ceramics Division was acquired as a totally owned subsidiary and was put into production shortly thereafter. In 1958, the Logan Clay Products Company of Logan, Ohio, purchased the Graff Kittanning Clay Products Company, and from that date on it was known as the Graff-Kittanning Division of the Logan Clay Products Company. R. M. Graff was president of Graff-Kittanning from the time of its incorporation until it was purchased by the Logan Clay Products Company. He was also General Manager of the operations from 1924 until his death in 1963. The following products were manufactured at the Craigsville plant: vitrified clay sewer pipe, clay flue liners, wall coping, and factory made joints. At the Worthington Ceramics Plant, clay building tile, drain tile, and flue lining were manufactured. A total of approximately two hundred people were employed at both operations, approximately one hundred fifty at the Graff-Kittanning Plant and fifty at Worthington Ceramics Plant. The products manufactured in both plants was distributed in Maine, New Hampshire, Massachusetts, New York, New Jersey, Delaware, Maryland, and Pennsylvania.

On April 23, 1990, a train carrying a caustic chemical and crude oil derailed and exploded, spewing about 100,000 gallons of oil and releasing a chemical cloud that forced 200 people to evacuate. 29 cars in a 97-car Buffalo & Pittsburgh Railroad freight train jumped the tracks in a steep ravine along Buffalo Creek. At the fire's peak, flames shooting several hundred feet high could be seen 30 miles away. In addition to the oil, one tanker leaked sodium hydroxide that sent a chemical cloud drifting toward Worthington, causing 200 people to be moved from their homes overnight. Ironically, the event occurred on Earth Day.

Today, Craigsville is part of Worthington-West Franklin Township. Nearly everything has shut down, but the United Methodist Church is still active, and Allegheny Mineral Corporation operates a limestone mine at the site of the old Graff-Kittanning Clay Products Company.

Craigsville P.O. appears in the 1876 Atlas of Armstrong County, Pennsylvania.
