= Troutville =

Troutville may refer to:

- Troutville, Virginia
- Troutville, Pennsylvania
