= Goschgoschink Path =

The Goschgoschink Path, later known as Mead's Path, begins at the junction of the Great Shamokin Path at The Big Spring near Luthersburg, Brady Township, Clearfield County, Pennsylvania. The path then proceeds to Thunderbird Spring, Sandy Valley Station, north of Reynoldsville, Jefferson County, thence through the Horme Settlement and slightly north of Emerickville to Brookville; north of Clarion, to West Hickory, Pennsylvania, in Forest County and the Allegheny River. From here, travelers could journey to Fort Le Boeuf and Lake Erie.

== Origins ==
Goschgoschink is the name applied at the time of Moravian missionary David Zeisberger's arrival in 1760 to three refugee Indian towns. The location of the "Goschgoschink" Pennsylvania Historical and Museum Commission Marker, erected 1947, is 41°34.067′N 79°24.2′W near West Hickory in Forest County, on US Route 62 about 0.1 miles (0.16 km) south of Main Street (Pennsylvania Route 127).

In his report to Governor Robert Dinwiddie, George Washington made reference to a beautiful rolling country, suitable for settlement, that he had found along the waters of French Creek. In 1788, brothers John and David Mead were ready to investigate Washington's story, and left Fort Augusta, now Sunbury, Pennsylvania, to explore the far west. They journeyed up mouth of Anderson Creek and turned at Coal Hill towards camp site and crossroads at The Big Spring. From there, they continued northwest on the Goschgoschink Path to the Venango Path and the waters of French Creek. On May 12, 1788, the Mead brothers founded Meadville, Pennsylvania, at the confluence of Cussewago Creek and French Creek.
