= Worthington, Pennsylvania =

Borough in Pennsylvania, US

- Borough
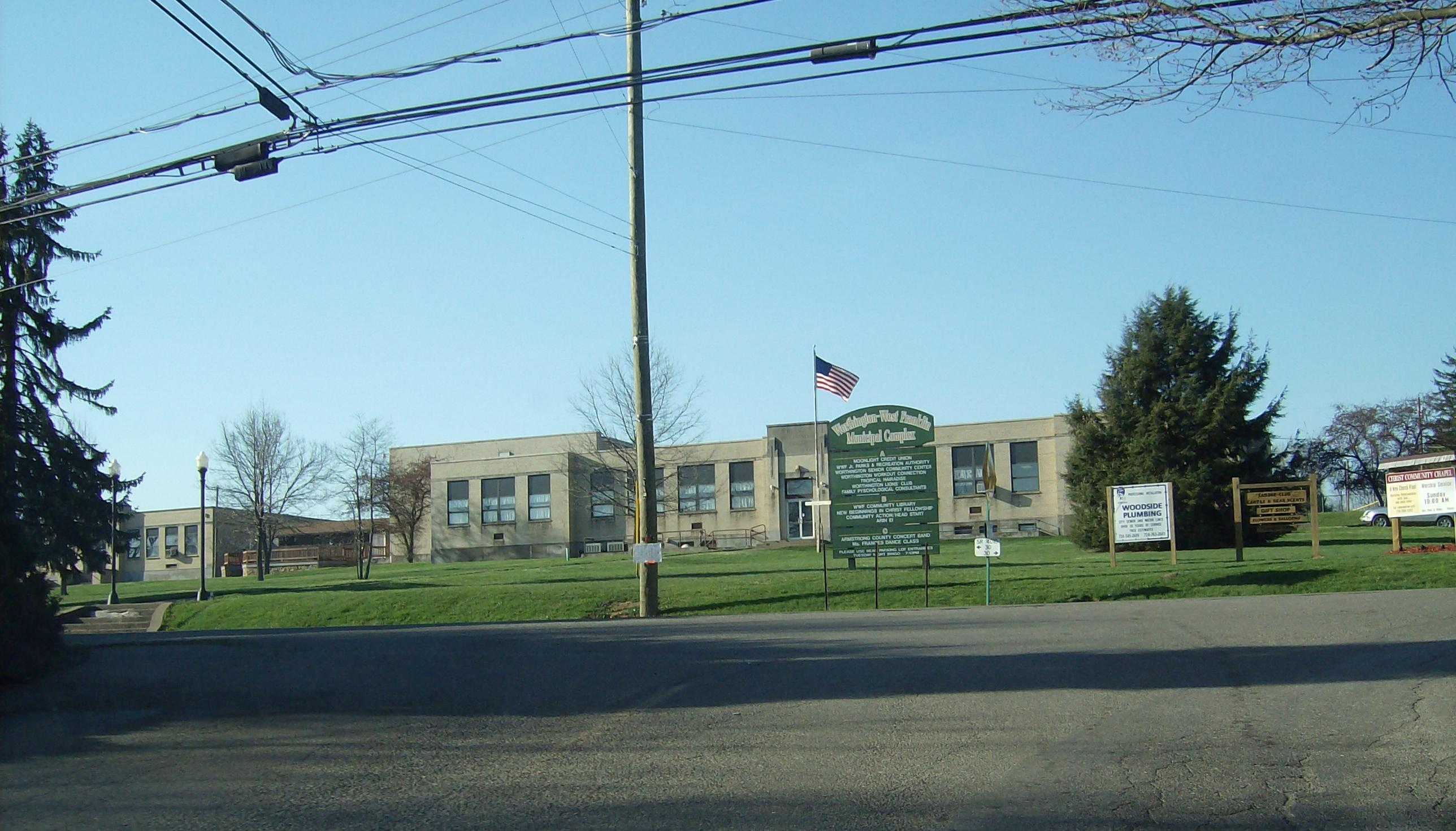
- Worthington-West Franklin Municipal Complex

- Location of Worthington in Armstrong County, Pennsylvania.

- Location within Pennsylvania
- Coordinates: 40°50′17″N 79°37′58″W
- Country: United States
- State: Pennsylvania
- County: Armstrong
- Settled: 1811
- Incorporated: 1855

Government
  - Type: Borough council

Area
  - Total: 0.69 sq mi (1.78 km^{2})
  - Land: 0.69 sq mi (1.78 km^{2})
  - Water: 0 sq mi (0.00 km^{2})
- Elevation: 1,120 ft (340 m)

Population (2020)
  - Total: 594
  - Estimate (2019): 589
  - Density: 856.5/sq mi (330.71/km^{2})
- Time zone: UTC-5 (Eastern (EST))
  - Summer (DST): UTC-4 (EDT)
- Zip code: 16262
- FIPS code: 42-86560

Worthington is a borough in Armstrong County, Pennsylvania, United States. The population was 594 at the 2020 census.

== History ==
Worthington was laid out on a tract of land called Mt. Lorenzo by Judge James Barr in 1843–1844. He chose the location due to the nearby junction of two important early stage coach routes, the east–west route from Indiana, Pennsylvania, to Butler, and the north–south route from Freeport to Emlenton. It was incorporated as a borough in 1855. As the village grew into a town it variously relied upon farming and light manufacturing for its income. During the 1970s most manufacturing ceased. Agriculture is still important to the region, and a few light tool and die firms survive. The region also features coal, natural gas, and mineral extraction. In the 19th century an iron furnace and woolen mill were the main industrial operations, both owned and operated by Peter Graff I.

The town's first settlers were a mix of eastern Pennsylvanians and newly arrived immigrants of Scotch-Irish, German and English background. Other ethnic groups would arrive in the early 20th century in small numbers. Other later industries included tile block and clay drain pipe manufacturing, aluminum ladder and specialty tool and die production, limestone mining, and underground mushroom farming. The town hosts four Protestant churches, one Catholic Church, Saint Patrick's Log Cabin Church, a community park, several civic organizations (including a public library), and a community center and municipal complex housed in the former Junior/Senior High School. The fire hall serves both Worthington borough and West Franklin Township.

The joint municipalities of Worthington borough and West Franklin Township (which includes the former villages of Craigsville, Yellowdog, and Laird's Crossing) have cooperated in many areas including public utilities (water and sewage), and both municipalities are often colloquially referred to as Worthington - sharing the same zip code of 16262. The former high school is actually located outside of Worthington borough and was officially called Worthington-West Franklin Jr./Sr. High School. The mascot for the school was the Bison, and the school colors were green and white. The school closed around 1984, and the students began attending Kittanning High School, which also closed in 2015 (along with Ford City and Elderton high schools) in order to form Armstrong High School.

Worthington P.O. appears in the 1876 Atlas of Armstrong County, Pennsylvania.

== Geography ==
Worthington is located in western Armstrong County at 40°50′17″N 79°37′58″W. U.S. Route 422, the four-lane Benjamin Franklin Highway, passes through the borough south of its center, leading east 7 miles (11 km) to Kittanning and west 15 miles (24 km) to Butler. The borough extends west into the valley of Buffalo Creek, a tributary of the Allegheny River.

According to the United States Census Bureau, the borough has a total area of 0.69 square miles (1.8 km^{2}), all land.

== Demographics ==
Historical population
Census	Pop.	Note	%±
1860	213		—
1870	216		1.4%
1880	186		−13.9%
1890	246		32.3%
1900	398		61.8%
1910	436		9.5%
1920	440		0.9%
1930	661		50.2%
1940	600		−9.2%
1950	800		33.3%
1960	772		−3.5%
1970	816		5.7%
1980	760		−6.9%
1990	713		−6.2%
2000	778		9.1%
2010	594		−23.7%
2020	594		0.0%

As of the 2000 census, there were 778 people, 307 households, and 212 families residing in the borough. The population density was 1,380.4 inhabitants per square mile (533.0/km^{2}). There were 319 housing units at an average density of 566.0 per square mile (218.5/km^{2}). The racial makeup of the borough was 99.10% |White, 0.26% African American, 0.13% Asian, 0.13% from other races, and 0.39% from two or more races. Hispanic or Latino of any race were 0.26% of the population.

There were 307 households, out of which 29.3% had children under the age of 18 living with them, 56.7% were married couples living together, 9.4% had a female householder with no husband present, and 30.9% were non-families. 26.4% of all households were made up of individuals, and 12.1% had someone living alone who was 65 years of age or older. The average household size was 2.43 and the average family size was 2.91.

The borough median age of 40 years was the same as the county median age. The distribution by age group was 22.2% under the age of 18, 7.8% from 18 to 24, 26.6% from 25 to 44, 26.9% from 45 to 64, and 16.5% who were 65 years of age or older. The median age was 40 years. For every 100 females there were 90.7 males. For every 100 females age 18 and over, there were 92.7 males.

The median income for a household in the borough was $31,000, and the median income for a family was $37,292. Males had a median income of $27,443 versus $21,818 for females. The per capita income for the borough was $15,122. About 2.9% of families and 9.2% of the population were below the poverty line, including 7.0% of those under age 18 and 7.8% of those age 65 or over.
