= Big Spring (Pennsylvania) =

Coordinates: 41.05056°N 78.72498°W

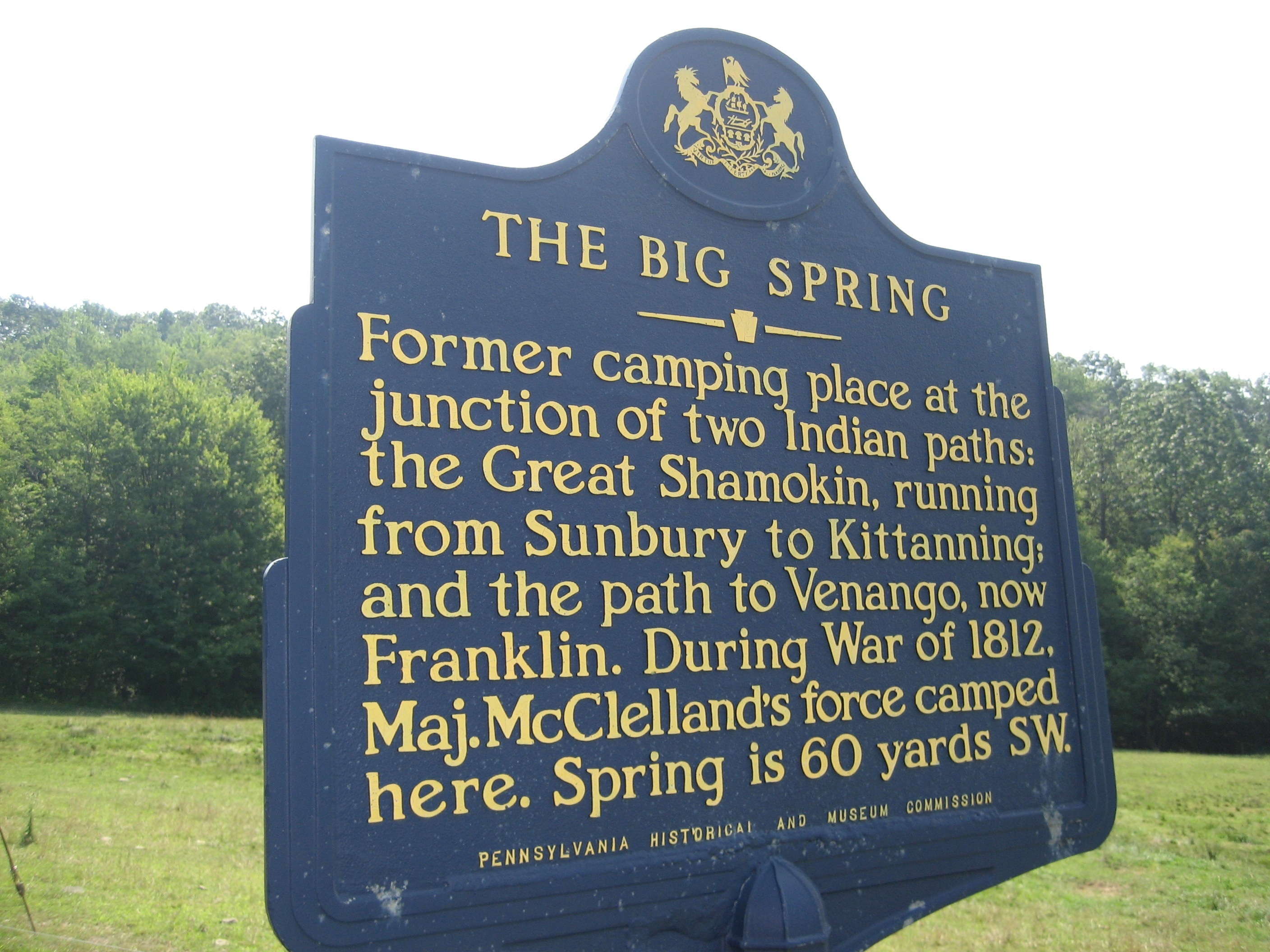
The Big Spring in Brady Township, Pennsylvania, was an important junction connecting the Great Shamokin Path and Goschgoschink Path.

The Big Spring near Luthersburg, Brady Township, Clearfield County, Pennsylvania, was an important camp site and trail hub for the Great Shamokin Path and the Goschgoschink Path.

The Great Shamokin Path connected the Susquehanna River with the Allegheny River, and extended across Pennsylvania from the native village Shamokin, on the Susquehanna River, to Kittanning, Pennsylvania, on the Allegheny River. The location of the Big Spring Pennsylvania Historical and Museum Commission Marker, dedicated December 29, 1950, is near US Route 322, on Pennsylvania Route 410, 0.5 miles (0.80 km) southwest of Luthersburg. The Big Spring was accessed by travelers after ascending the steep Anderson Creek Gorge for several miles, then turning west at what is now known as Chestnut Grove, Bloom Township, Pennsylvania.

The Goschgoschink Path, later known as Mead's Path, begins at The Big Spring and proceeds to Thunderbird Spring (Old State Road), Sandy Valley Station, north of Reynoldsville, Jefferson County, thence through the Horme Settlement and slightly north of Emerickville to Brookville; north of Clarion, to West Hickory, Pennsylvania, in Forest County and the Allegheny River. From here, travelers could journey to Fort Le Boeuf and Lake Erie.

In his report to Governor Robert Dinwiddie, George Washington made reference to a beautiful rolling country, suitable for settlement, that he had found along the waters of French Creek. In 1788, brothers John and David Mead were ready to investigate Washington's story, and left Fort Augusta, now Sunbury, Pennsylvania, to explore the far west. They journeyed up mouth of Anderson Creek and turned at Coal Hill towards camp site and crossroads at The Big Spring. From there, they continued northwest on the Goschgoschink Path to the Venango Path and the waters of French Creek. On May 12, 1788, the Mead brothers founded Meadville, Pennsylvania, at the confluence of Cussewago Creek and French Creek.

During the War of 1812, Major William McCelland departed Fort Loudoun, near Chambersburg, Pennsylvania, on March 4, 1814, and marched a division of troops numbering 221 privates, three captains. five lieutenants and two ensigns along Anderson Creek to meet the Goschgoschink Path at the Big Spring. McClelland's division relieved American forces at Lake Erie and later gave a good account of themselves at the Battle of Chippewa and Battle of Lundy's Lane.
