= Wyalusing Path =

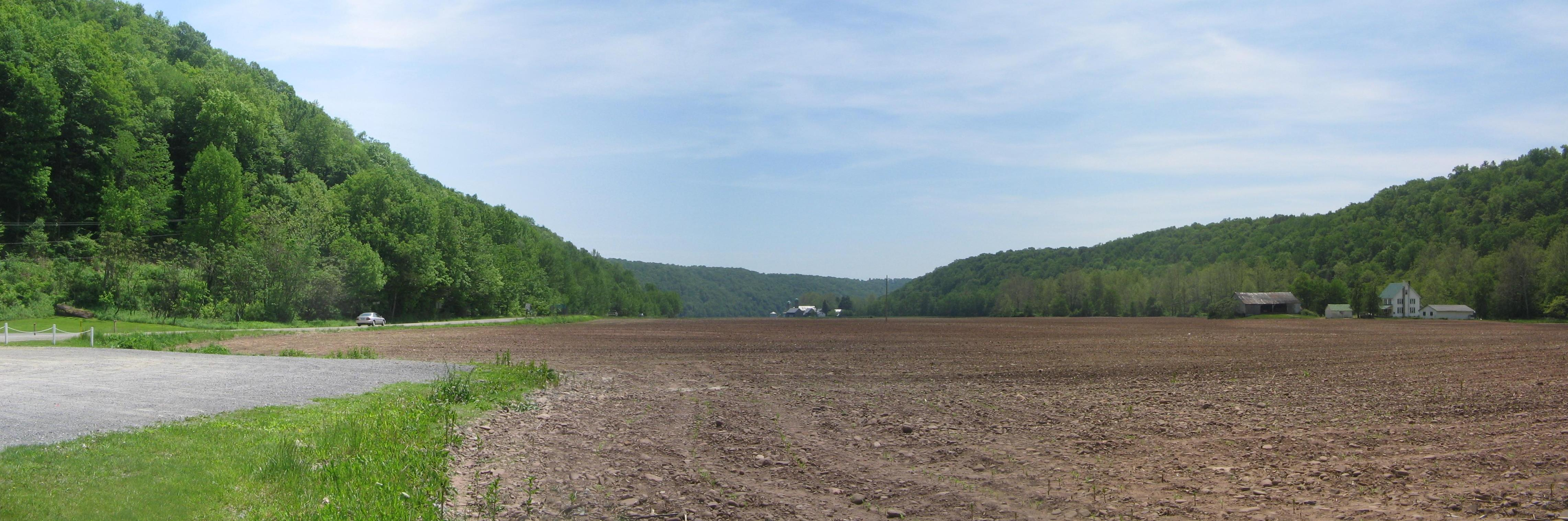
The Wyalusing Path followed the Muncy Creek valley through Davidson Township in Sullivan County, as does U.S. Route 220 today.

The Wyalusing Path or trail was a historical trace that ran from what is now Wyalusing to the Native American village of Canaserage (now Muncy) in Pennsylvania in the United States. Wyalusing is on the east bank of the North Branch of the Susquehanna River in Bradford County and Muncy is on the east bank of the West Branch Susquehanna River in Lycoming County, so the path provided a short cut between the two main branches of the Susquehanna River. The alternative and much longer route was to follow the North Branch south from Wyalusing to the confluence with the West Branch at the Native village of Shamokin (now Sunbury, Pennsylvania), then north up the West Branch to Muncy.

On leaving Wyalusing, the path went south a short distance, then forded the Susquehanna River near the Moravian village of Friedenshütten. It followed Sugar Run Creek upstream, climbed Bartlett Mountain, and crossed into what is now Sullivan County near the modern-day village of Colley in Colley Township. The Wyalusing Path climbed Dutch Mountain (coming near or crossing into Wyoming County), then passed between the headwaters of Loyalsock Creek and Mehoopany Creek in Sullivan County. The exact course of the path is less clear here, but it encountered Muncy Creek near its source in Sullivan County and followed it to its mouth at Canaserage (Muncy).

Much of what we know about the Wyalusing Path comes from travelers' accounts of it. In May 1772, Samuel Harris had to ford Muncy Creek twenty times following the path. In June 1772, Moravian Bishop John Ettwein led a group of some 200 Lenape and Mohican Christians from their village of Friedenshütten (Cabins of Peace) west along the Wyalusing Path to Muncy, fording Muncy Creek thirty six times along the way. At Muncy they took the Great Shamokin Path and others to their new village of Friedensstadt (City of Peace) on the Beaver River in southwestern Pennsylvania.

The trail crosses some of the roughest terrain in northeast Pennsylvania, but provided a major transit route for Native American populations.
