= Pennsylvania Route 410 =

State highway in Pennsylvania, US

Pennsylvania Route 410

Route information
- Maintained by PennDOT
- Length: 8.971 mi (14.437 km)
- Existed: 1928–present

Major junctions
- West end: US 119 in Henderson Township
- East end: US 219 / US 322 in Brady Township

Location
- Country: United States
- State: Pennsylvania
- Counties: Jefferson, Clearfield

Highway system
- Pennsylvania State Route System; Interstate; US; State; Scenic; Legislative
← PA 409	→ PA 412

Pennsylvania Route 410 (PA 410) is a 9-mile-long (14 km) state highway located in Jefferson and Clearfield counties in Pennsylvania. The western terminus is at US 119 near Big Run. The eastern terminus is at US 219/US 322 in Brady Township.

== Route description ==
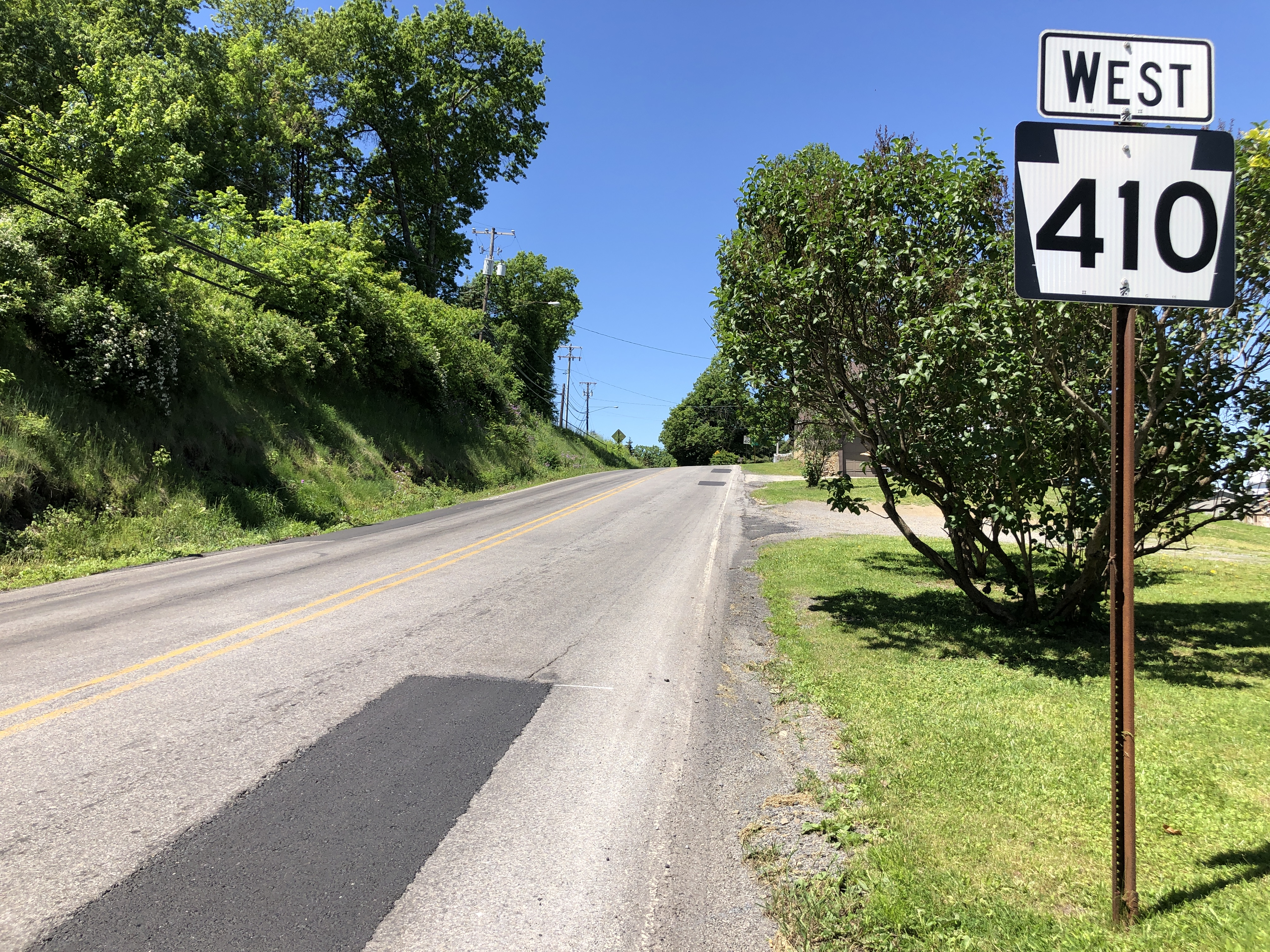
PA 410 westbound past US 219/US 322 in Luthersburg

PA 410 begins at an intersection with US 119 in Henderson Township, Jefferson County, heading east on a two-lane undivided road. The route crosses the Buffalo and Pittsburgh Railroad's B&P Main Line Subdivision line and heads through a mix of farmland and woodland with some homes, turning to the northeast. The road heads north through more open agricultural areas before another curve to the northeast. PA 410 enters Brady Township in Clearfield County and becomes Main Street, heading east through more farms and woods with some residences. The road crosses into the borough of Troutville and turns northeast, passing homes. The route heads back into Brady Township and runs through more agricultural areas with some residences, turning east onto Shamokin Trail. The road heads past more fields before turning east-northeast through wooded areas. PA 410 continues northeast through a mix of farmland and woodland with some homes before ending at an intersection with US 219/US 322 in the community of Luthersburg.

== Major intersections ==
County	Location	mi	km	Destinations	Notes
Jefferson	Henderson Township	0.000	0.000	US 119 – Punxsutawney, DuBois	Western terminus
Clearfield	Brady Township	8.971	14.437	US 219 / US 322 (Carson Hill Road / Luthersburg-Rockton Road) – DuBois, Brookville, Clearfield	Eastern terminus
1.000 mi = 1.609 km; 1.000 km = 0.621 mi

== PA 410 Truck ==
Pennsylvania Route 410 Truck
- Location: Henderson Township - Brady Township
- Existed: 2013–2017

Pennsylvania Route 410 Truck was a truck route around a weight-restricted bridge over the Beaver Run. The route began at the intersection of PA 410 and US 219/322. After US 322 and US 219 split, the route followed US 219. At the intersection later at Pennsylvania Route 729 and Pennsylvania Route 879, the route continued to follow US 219. At the intersection of Pennsylvania Route 36 and US 219, PA 410 Truck followed PA 36. Truck PA 410 then followed US 119 at the intersection of PA 36 and US 119, until routing back to PA 410. The route was signed in 2013. The bridge was reconstructed in 2017, and the route was effectively removed.
