= Lenape Technical School =

Coordinates: 40.76767°N 79.52065°W

- 2215 Chaplin Avenue; Ford City, PA; United States

Information
- Type: Public
- Established: 1965
- Principal: Jason Gurski
- Faculty: 37
- Grades: 10–12
- Enrollment: 500+
- Athletics: SkillsUSA
- Website: lenape.k12.pa.us

Lenape Technical School is a public technical high school in Ford City, Pennsylvania. It offers vocational training in 14 technical areas. Students attend Lenape Tech full-time or part-time for two or three years, 10th through 12th grade, and receive training in their chosen technical field and their complementary academic disciplines. Additionally, Lenape Tech offers job-specific and personal improvement training programs for adults, including a Practical Nursing Program.
