= Luthersburg, Pennsylvania =

Unincorporated community in Pennsylvania, US

- Unincorporated community
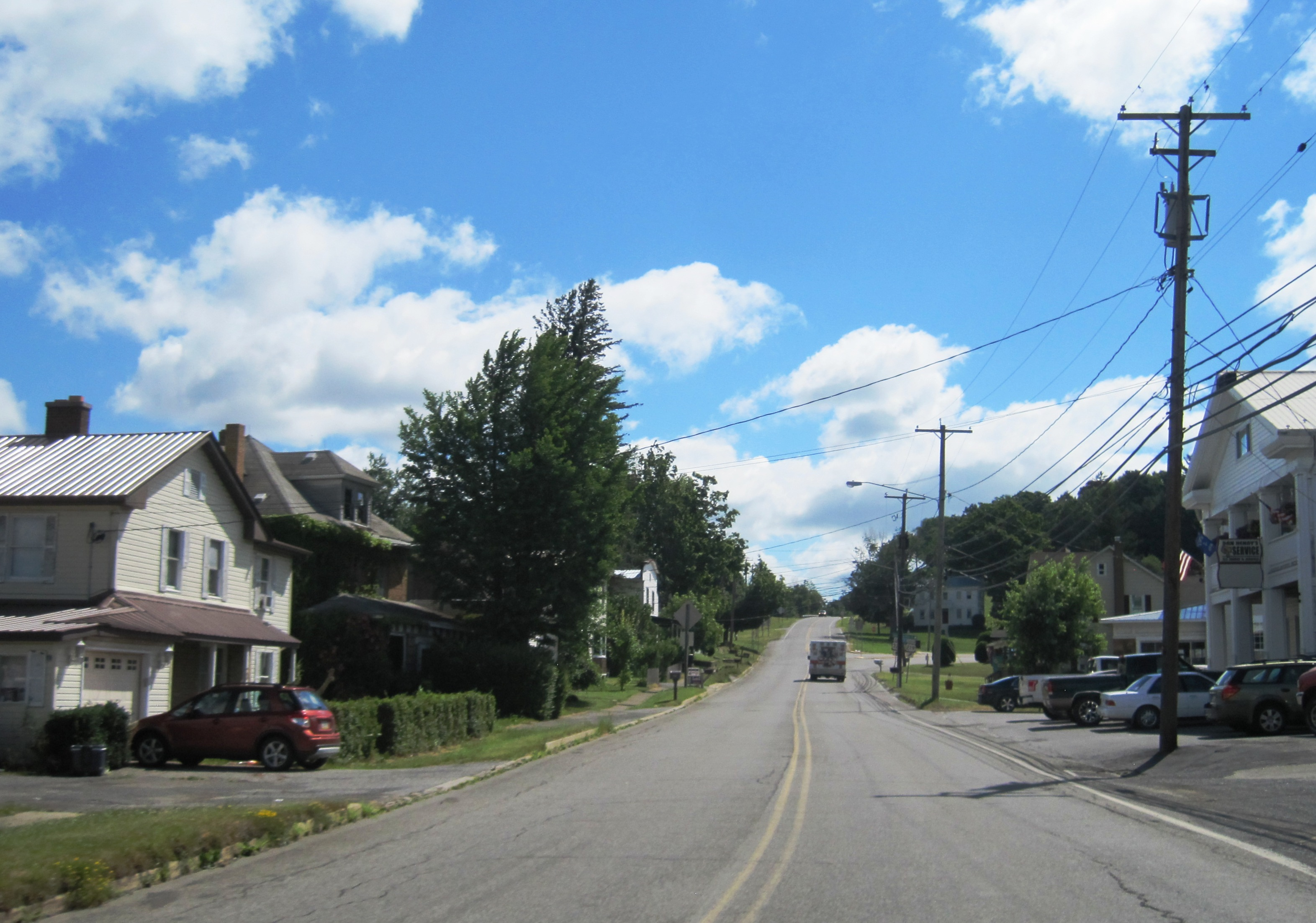
- Add pic

- Location within Pennsylvania
- Coordinates: 41°03′12″N 78°43′09″W
- Country: United States
- State: Pennsylvania
- County: Clearfield
- Elevation: 1,831 ft (558 m)
- Time zone: UTC-5 (Eastern (EST))
  - Summer (DST): UTC-4 (EDT)
- ZIP code: 15848
- Area code: 814
- GNIS feature ID: 1192863

Luthersburg is an unincorporated community in Clearfield County, Pennsylvania, United States. The community is located at the intersection of U.S. routes 219 and 322, and Pennsylvania Route 410, 5.1 miles (8.2 km) south-southeast of DuBois. Luthersburg has a post office, with ZIP code 15848.

The community was named for W. H. Luther, an early settler.

== Demographics ==
Historical population
Census	Pop.	Note	%±

The United States Census Bureau defined Luthersburg as a census designated place (CDP) in 2023.
