= West Shamokin High School =

West Shamokin Junior–Senior High School

Location
- 178 Wolf Drive; Rural Valley, Armstrong County, Pennsylvania 16249-9720; United States
- 40.7951951°N 79.2701568°W

Information
- School type: Public secondary school
- Established: 2000
- School district: Armstrong School District
- NCES District ID: 4202590
- School code: PA-128030852-7640
- CEEB code: 394310
- NCES School ID: 420259000517
- Principal: Stephen Shutters
- Staff: 50.02 (on an FTE basis)
- Grades: 7–12
- Enrollment: 524 (2022-2023)
  - Grade 7: 123
  - Grade 8: 93
  - Grade 9: 134
  - Grade 10: 70
  - Grade 11: 50
  - Grade 12: 54
- Student to teacher ratio: 10.48
- Colors: Black and Silver
- Athletics: Basketball, baseball, cheerleading, cross country, football, soccer, softball, volleyball, golf
- Athletics conference: PIAA
- Nickname: Wolves
- USNWR ranking: 3,439
- Website: wshs.asd.k12.pa.us

West Shamokin Junior–Senior High School (WSHS) is a small, public high school located in Rural Valley, Pennsylvania, in the United States. It is one of three high schools operated by the Armstrong School District. West Shamokin was founded in June 2000 to consolidate the Shannock Valley Jr/Sr and the Dayton Jr/Sr high schools.

== Admissions ==
The school is 98% white. Some students with disabilities attend the school, and dedicated staff are available to these students.

== Curriculum ==
Students can attend Lenape Technical School for vocational education for half a day when they enter their sophomore year or a full day once a junior. 74% of graduates experience college success.

== Extracurricular activities ==
The school offers various clubs and activities: Leo Club, National Honor Society, Yearbook Club, Key Club, Quiz Bowl, FCS Competition, School Store, and Newspaper. The school permits clubs to meet after classes or in the early morning. West Shamokin's Quiz Bowl team has qualified for the yearly national tournament repeatedly.

=== Athletics ===
The school provides the following athletic programs:

==== Varsity and JV ====
Boys	Girls
Basketball-AA	Basketball-AA
Volleyball-AA	Volleyball-AA
Cross Country-A	Cross Country-A
Baseball-AA	Softball-AA
Golf-AA	Cheer-AA
Soccer-A	
Football-AA	

==== Junior high school sports ====
Boys

- Basketball
- Football
- Soccer
- Wrestling

Girls

- Basketball
- Cheer
- Volleyball

== Campus ==
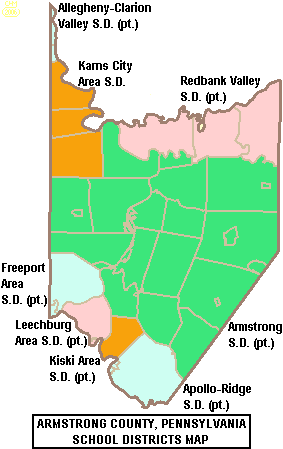
School District region in Armstrong County

The school is housed in a one-story building. The building contains a gymnasium, auditorium, several classrooms, a lunch room for students, a faculty room, a kitchen, a courtyard, a band room/music room, computer labs, and offices for the staff. The building offers handicapped access, computer systems, emergency, security guards, lighting and power, and an access bridge. The campus includes a fitness center as well as baseball/softball, soccer, and turf American football fields.
