= West Franklin Township, Pennsylvania =

Township in Pennsylvania, US

Coordinates: 40°50′48″N 79°39′15″W

- Township
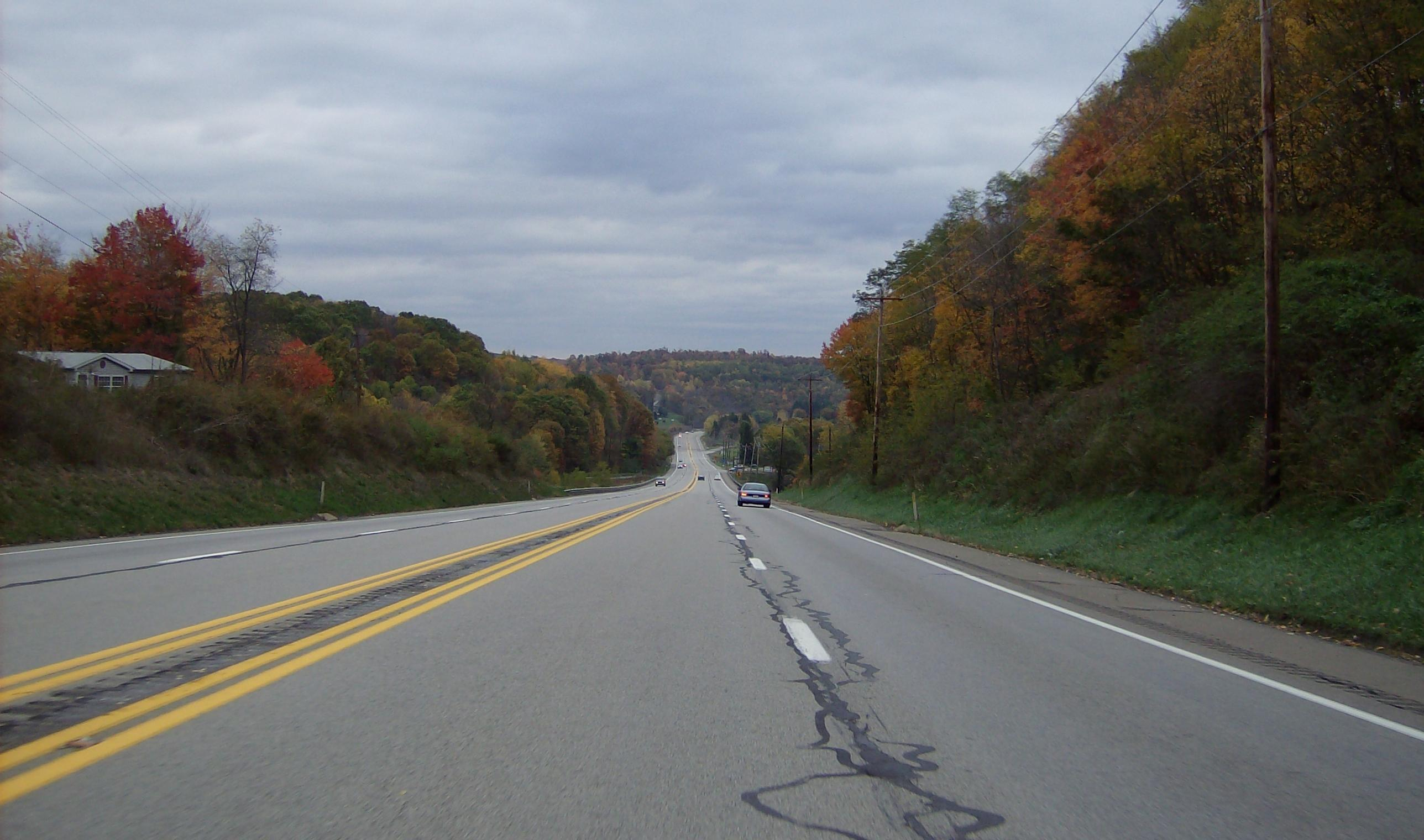
- U.S. Route 422 in West Franklin Township

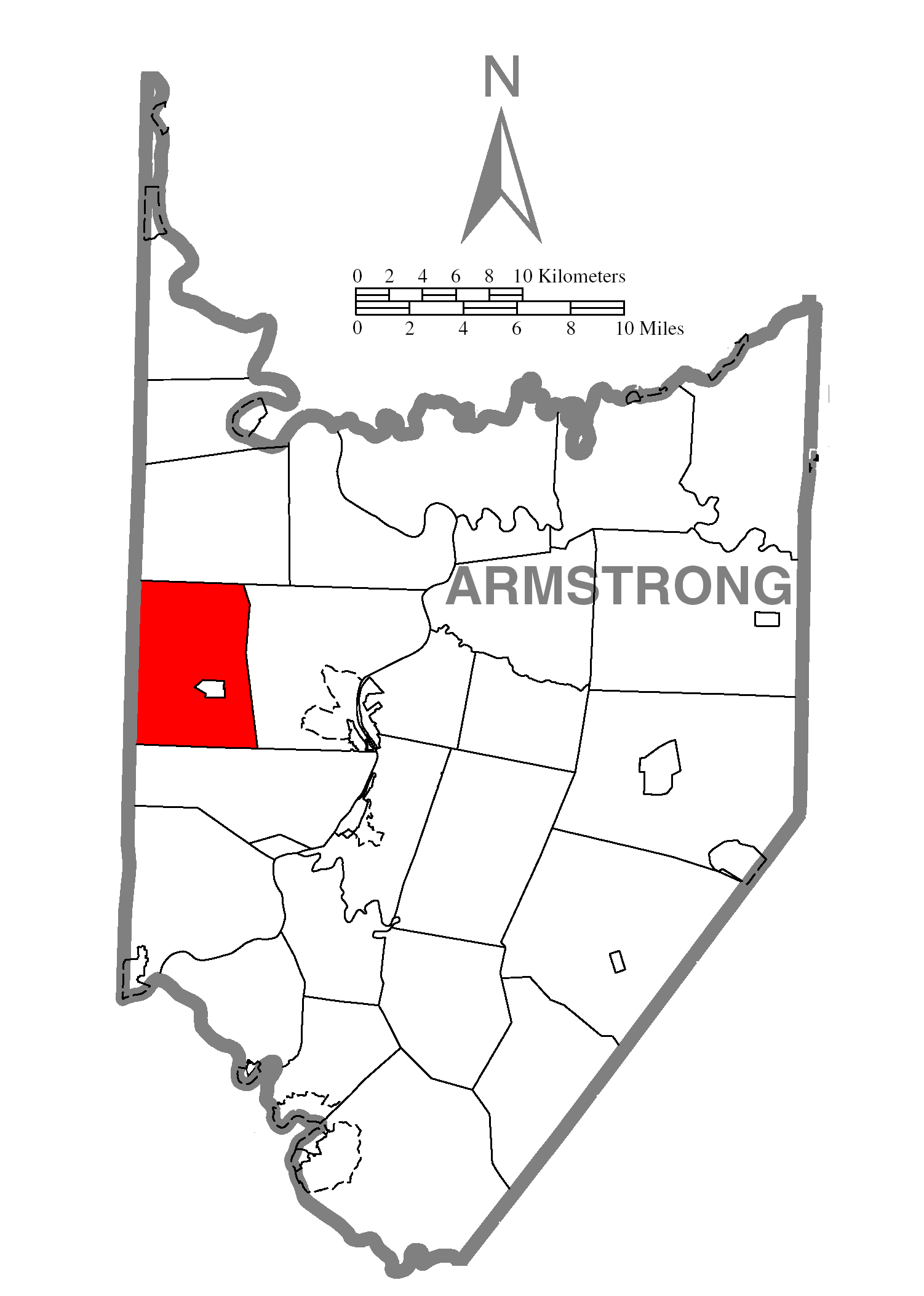
- Map of Armstrong County, Pennsylvania, highlighting West Franklin Township

- Map of Armstrong County, Pennsylvania
- Country: United States
- State: Pennsylvania
- County: Armstrong
- Settled: 1790
- Incorporated: 1868

Area
  - Total: 26.08 sq mi (67.55 km^{2})
  - Land: 26.08 sq mi (67.55 km^{2})
  - Water: 0 sq mi (0.00 km^{2})

Population (2020)
  - Total: 1,709
  - Estimate (2021): 1,696
  - Density: 67.8/sq mi (26.19/km^{2})
- Time zone: UTC-5 (Eastern (EST))
  - Summer (DST): UTC-4 (EDT)
- FIPS code: 42-005-83024

West Franklin Township is a township in Armstrong County, Pennsylvania, United States. The population was 1,709 at the 2020 census, a decline from the figure of 1,853 tabulated in 2010.

== Geography ==
West Franklin Township is located in western Armstrong County, bordering Butler County. It completely surrounds the borough of Worthington. U.S. Route 422 runs through the township, connecting Kittanning and Butler. Buffalo Creek, a tributary of the Allegheny River, flows southward through the township.

According to the United States Census Bureau, the township has a total area of 26.1 square miles (67.5 km^{2}), all land.

== Recreation ==
A portion of Pennsylvania State Game Lands Number 259 is located in West Franklin Township.

== Demographics ==
Historical population
| Census | Pop. | Note | %± |
|---|---|---|---|
| 2000 | 1,935 | | — |
| 2010 | 1,853 | | −4.2% |
| 2020 | 1,709 | | −7.8% |
| 2021 (est.) | 1,696 | | −0.8% |
U.S. Decennial Census

As of the 2000 census, there were 1,935 people, 748 households, and 575 families residing in the township. The population density was 73.6 inhabitants per square mile (28.4/km^{2}). There were 804 housing units at an average density of 30.6 per square mile (11.8/km^{2}). The racial makeup of the township was 99.28% White, 0.16% Asian, 0.36% from other races, and 0.21% from two or more races. Hispanic or Latino of any race were 0.78% of the population.

There were 748 households, out of which 32.8% had children under the age of 18 living with them, 65.6% were married couples living together, 7.6% had a female householder with no husband present, and 23.1% were non-families. 19.5% of all households were made up of individuals, and 9.4% had someone living alone who was 65 years of age or older. The average household size was 2.59 and the average family size was 2.96.

The township median age of 39 years was slightly less than the county median age of 40 years. The distribution by age group was 23.7% under the age of 18, 6.7% from 18 to 24, 30.2% from 25 to 44, 25.7% from 45 to 64, and 13.6% who were 65 years of age or older. The median age was 39 years. For every 100 females, there were 95.9 males. For every 100 females age 18 and over, there were 94.5 males.

The median income for a household in the township was $33,616, and the median income for a family was $37,042. Males had a median income of $29,740 versus $19,141 for females. The per capita income for the township was $15,423. About 8.2% of families and 11.1% of the population were below the poverty line, including 21.3% of those under age 18 and 3.3% of those age 65 or over.

== History ==
West Franklin Township appears in the 1876 Atlas of Armstrong County, Pennsylvania.

== Cemeteries ==
- Franklin Union Baptist Church Cemetery
