= Troutville, Pennsylvania =

Borough in Pennsylvania, US

- Borough
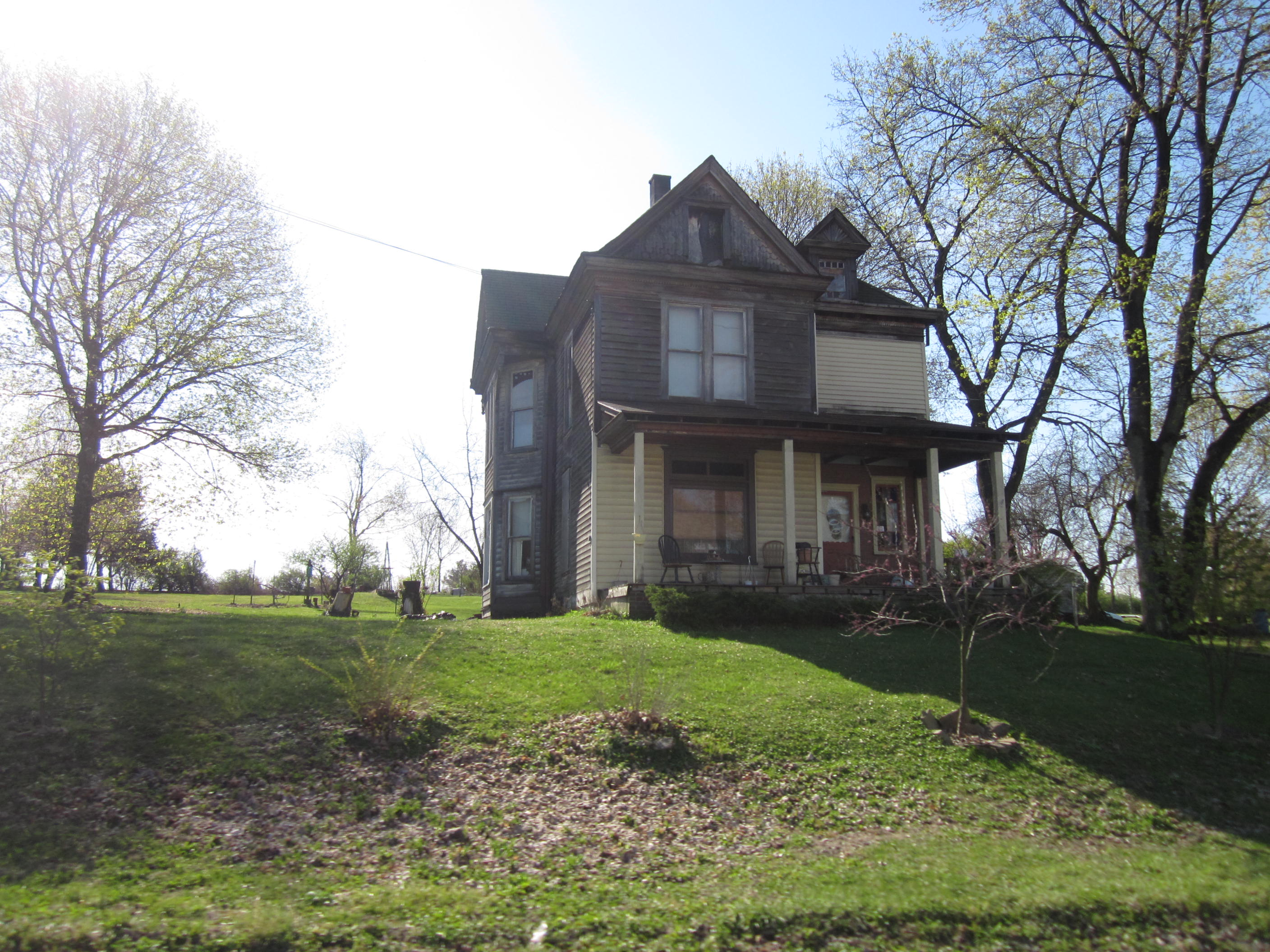
- Troutville, Pennsylvania

- Location of Troutville in Clearfield County, Pennsylvania.

- Location of Clearfield County in Pennsylvania

- Location in Pennsylvania
- Coordinates: 41°01′26″N 78°47′14″W
- Country: United States
- State: Pennsylvania
- County: Clearfield
- Settled: 1854
- Incorporated: 1890

Government
  - Type: Borough Council

Area
  - Total: 0.77 sq mi (2.00 km^{2})
  - Land: 0.77 sq mi (2.00 km^{2})
  - Water: 0 sq mi (0.00 km^{2})
- Elevation: 1,569 ft (478 m)

Population (2020)
  - Total: 230
  - Estimate (2021): 231
  - Density: 291.9/sq mi (112.69/km^{2})
- Time zone: UTC-5 (Eastern (EST))
  - Summer (DST): UTC-4 (EDT)
- ZIP code: 15866
- Area code: 814
- FIPS code: 42-77568

Troutville is a borough in Clearfield County, Pennsylvania, United States. The population was 230 at the 2020 census.

== Geography ==
Troutville is located near the western border of Clearfield County at 41°1′26″N 78°47′14″W (41.023829, -78.787111). Pennsylvania Route 410 passes through the borough, leading east 4 miles (6 km) to Luthersburg and southwest 5 miles (8 km) to U.S. Route 119 near Big Run.

According to the United States Census Bureau, Troutville has a total area of 0.77 square miles (2.0 km^{2}), all land.

== Demographics ==
Historical population
Census	Pop.	Note	%±
1900	308		—
1910	260		−15.6%
1920	277		6.5%
1930	215		−22.4%
1940	238		10.7%
1950	223		−6.3%
1960	209		−6.3%
1970	190		−9.1%
1980	204		7.4%
1990	226		10.8%
2000	224		−0.9%
2010	240		7.1%
2020	230		−4.2%
2021 (est.)	231	▲	0.4%

As of the census of 2000, there were 224 people, 82 households, and 65 families residing in the borough. The population density was 286.1 inhabitants per square mile (110.5/km^{2}). There were 86 housing units at an average density of 109.8 per square mile (42.4/km^{2}). The racial makeup of the borough was 98.66% White, and 1.34% from two or more races.

There were 82 households, out of which 39.0% had children under the age of 18 living with them, 62.2% were married couples living together, 14.6% had a female householder with no husband present, and 20.7% were non-families. 18.3% of all households were made up of individuals, and 11.0% had someone living alone who was 65 years of age or older. The average household size was 2.73 and the average family size was 3.15.

In the borough the population was spread out, with 28.1% under the age of 18, 8.5% from 18 to 24, 26.3% from 25 to 44, 21.9% from 45 to 64, and 15.2% who were 65 years of age or older. The median age was 38 years. For every 100 females there were 86.7 males. For every 100 females age 18 and over, there were 80.9 males.

The median income for a household in the borough was $32,813, and the median income for a family was $37,188. Males had a median income of $29,375 versus $20,000 for females. The per capita income for the borough was $15,335. About 3.3% of families and 7.1% of the population were below the poverty line, including none of those under the age of eighteen or sixty five or over.
