= Rural Valley, Pennsylvania =

Borough in Pennsylvania, US

- Borough
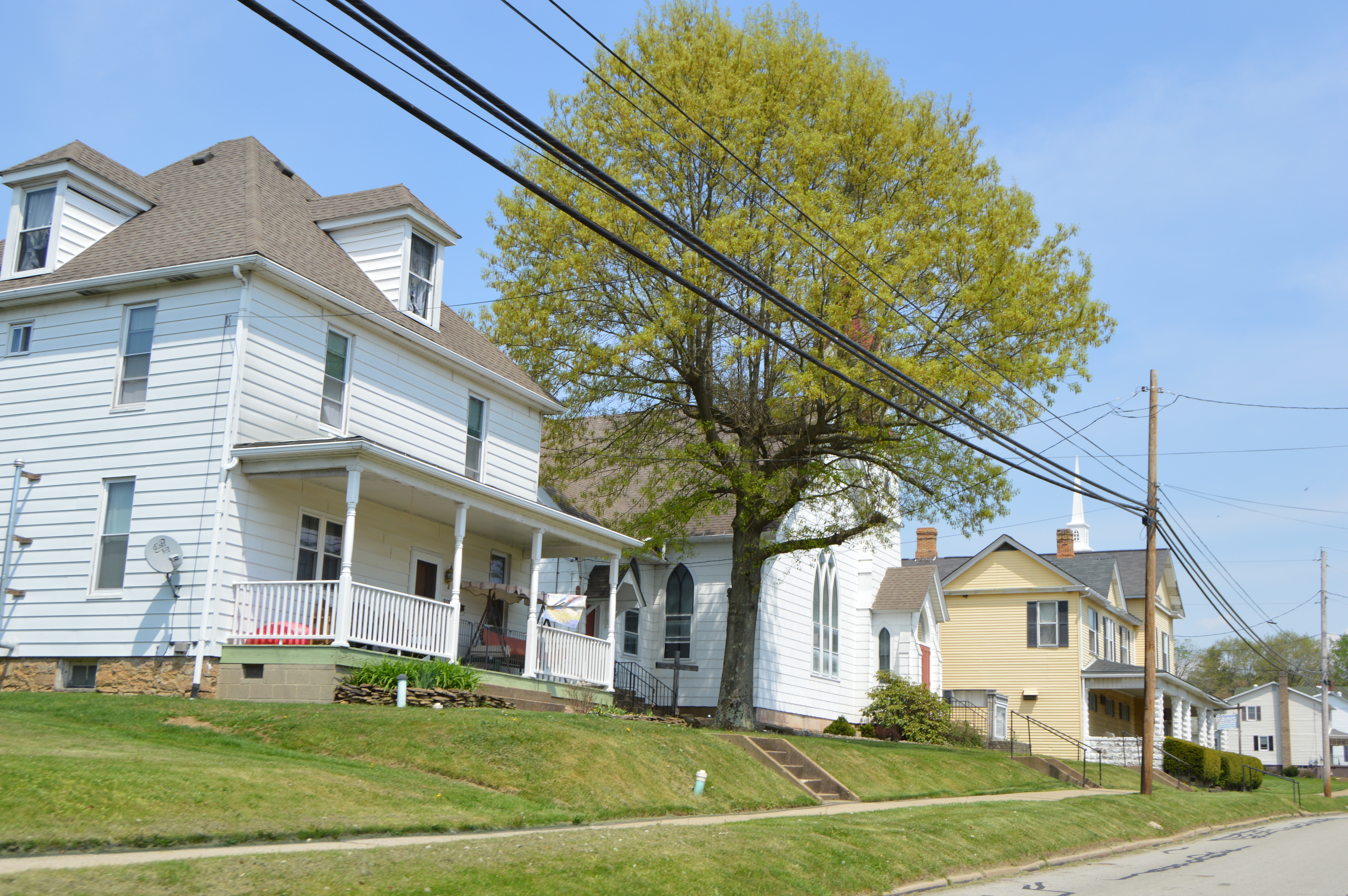
- Houses and churches on Main Street

- Location of Rural Valley in Armstrong County, Pennsylvania.

- Location within Pennsylvania
- Coordinates: 40°47′55″N 79°18′57″W
- Country: United States
- State: Pennsylvania
- County: Armstrong

Government
  - Type: Borough Council

Area
  - Total: 2.11 sq mi (5.47 km^{2})
  - Land: 2.11 sq mi (5.47 km^{2})
  - Water: 0 sq mi (0.00 km^{2})
- Elevation: 1,120 ft (340 m)

Population (2020)
  - Total: 826
  - Estimate (2019): 814
  - Density: 385.5/sq mi (148.86/km^{2})
- Time zone: UTC-5 (Eastern (EST))
  - Summer (DST): UTC-4 (EDT)
- Zip code: 16249
- FIPS code: 42-66720

Rural Valley is a borough in Armstrong County, Pennsylvania, United States. The population was 826 at the 2020 census.

== Geography ==
Rural Valley is located in eastern Armstrong County at 40°47′55″N 79°18′57″W (40.798714, −79.315932). Pennsylvania Route 85 passes through the borough, leading west 12 miles (19 km) to Kittanning and east 14 miles (23 km) to U.S. Route 119 at Home.

According to the United States Census Bureau, the borough has a total area of 2.1 square miles (5.5 km^{2}), all land.

=== Streams ===
Cowanshannock Creek flows west through Rural Valley, leading to the Allegheny River.

== Demographics ==
Historical population
Census	Pop.	Note	%±
1880	183		—
1910	763		—
1920	841		10.2%
1930	948		12.7%
1940	900		−5.1%
1950	857		−4.8%
1960	860		0.4%
1970	962		11.9%
1980	1,033		7.4%
1990	957		−7.4%
2000	922		−3.7%
2010	876		−5.0%
2020	826		−5.7%

As of the 2000 census, there were 922 people, 382 households, and 267 families residing in the borough. The population density was 438.3 inhabitants per square mile (169.2/km^{2}). There were 414 housing units at an average density of 196.8 per square mile (76.0/km^{2}). The racial makeup of the borough was 98.26% White, 0.54% African American, 0.22% Native American, and 0.98% from two or more races. Hispanic or Latino of any race were 0.11% of the population.

There were 382 households, out of which 24.9% had children under the age of 18 living with them, 55.0% were married couples living together, 11.8% had a female householder with no husband present, and 30.1% were non-families. 26.7% of all households were made up of individuals, and 14.9% had someone living alone who was 65 years of age or older. The average household size was 2.33 and the average family size was 2.80.

The borough median age of 42 years was more than the county median age of 40 years. The distribution by age group was 20.1% under the age of 18, 8.7% from 18 to 24, 25.4% from 25 to 44, 24.7% from 45 to 64, and 21.1% who were 65 years of age or older. The median age was 42 years. For every 100 females there were 97.9 males. For every 100 females age 18 and over, there were 89.5 males.

The median income for a household in the borough was $26,250, and the median income for a family was $34,327. Males had a median income of $27,946 versus $20,000 for females. The per capita income for the borough was $14,238. About 13.0% of families and 17.4% of the population were below the poverty line, including 23.2% of those under age 18 and 15.4% of those age 65 or over.

== Cemetery ==
- Rural Valley Cemetery

== See also ==
- West Shamokin High School
