= WJAC =

WJAC may refer to:

- WJAC-TV, an NBC–affiliated station located in Johnstown, Pennsylvania
- The former call sign, or a derivative thereof the following stations:
  - WKGE, a radio station (850 AM) in Johnstown previously known as WJAC (AM)
  - WKYE, a radio station (96.5 FM) in Johnstown previously known as WJAC-FM
- World Junior A Challenge, an international ice hockey tournament
- Women's Junior Air Corps
