= WCRO =

- Johnstown, Pennsylvania; United States
- Broadcast area: Johnstown, Pennsylvania
- Frequency: 1230 kHz
- Branding: Kool 102.9 WCRO

Programming
- Format: Oldies
- Affiliations: Pittsburgh Penguins Radio Network; Pittsburgh Pirates Radio Network

Ownership
- Owner: Lightner Communications LLC

History
- First air date: September 26, 1947
- Call sign meaning: "Something to Crow About!" (former slogan)

Technical information
- Licensing authority: FCC
- Facility ID: 18050
- Class: C
- Power: 1,000 watts (unlimited)
- Transmitter coordinates: 40°19′55.3″N 78°54′45.1″W
- Translator: 102.9 W275CV (Johnstown)

Links
- Public license information: Public file; LMS
- Webcast: Listen live
- Website: www.lightnercommunications.com/wcro-easy-favorites/

WCRO (1230 AM) is an American radio station in Johnstown, Pennsylvania, broadcasting an oldies format. The station is owned and operated by Lightner Communications out of Altoona, Pennsylvania. WCRO broadcasts with a full-time power of 1,000 watts.

== History ==
WCRO has the distinction of retaining the same call sign since first going on the air in September 1947, and that it has never had a sister FM station co-located with it. The application was first filed on July 29, 1946, with a construction permit granted on December 11, 1946.

WCRO's first owner was Century Broadcasting Corporation, headed by John Keel. John Hanssen served as the station's first general manager. The station operated then with a power of 250 watts, and was an affiliate of the ABC Radio Network. Studios were located at 317 Main Street in downtown Johnstown but were moved in 1952 to the Fort Stanwix Hotel at 332 Main Street. In 1961, the station was granted permission to raise its daytime power output from 250 watts to 1,000 watts, three years after initially applying for a frequency change from 1230 to 850 kHz. The latter frequency would later be adopted by WJAC (now WKGE).

The station moved in 1966 from the Ft. Stanwix Hotel to the second floor of the Carnegie Building at the corner of Main and Clinton Streets in Johnstown. Eleven years later, Century Broadcasting Corporation changed the name of the licensee to Century Broadcasting of Pennsylvania.

In March 1984, Century Broadcasting, after more than 37 years of ownership, sold WCRO to Hamilton Communications, a company headed by Robert Hamilton. Doris Lichtenfels took over as general manager after Sandy D. Neri left to join WJAC and WJAC-FM, the latter being newly rechristened as WKYE "Key 95", in September 1983. Studios were then moved to 407 Main Street.

By this time, WCRO had gone into a decline, largely because of the collapse of Johnstown's lucrative coal and steel industries, resulting in a domino effect to the local retail economy. Hamilton Communications responded by selling WCRO to Tschudy Communications in August 1989.

Shortly after Tschudy's takeover, WCRO's full-time airstaff was laid off and replaced with Satellite Music Network's "Starstation" adult contemporary format (known today as "Hits and Favorites") also used by neighboring stations WCCS and WOKW. Though the reduced operating costs did help the station's fortunes somewhat, a sale from then-owner Tschudy Communications was inevitable to keep the station from falling into bankruptcy.

WCRO was sold in February 1991 from Tschudy Communications to J. Richard Lee, who formed the Eagle Radio Network, making WCRO its flagship station. Lee had purchased two other AM stations north of Johnstown that had recently gone dark and their studios vacated and assets liquidated through bankruptcy proceedings. Because those stations, WNCC and WRDD, no longer had separate studio buildings or facilities of their own other than their tower sites, they became repeaters for WCRO. WCRO and Eagle Radio Network operations then moved to 616 Main Street.

Eagle Radio operated with a format of time-brokered Christian talk and teaching and had been successful for about four years until the Federal Communications Commission (FCC) approved a series of applications for FM translators and power increases for Christian-formatted competitors on that band. Faced with the prospect of being squeezed out of business by its FM counterparts, Eagle Radio put all three stations up for sale in the mid-1990s.

WNCC and WRDD were sold in February 1997 to Vernal Enterprises of Indiana, Pennsylvania, which owned WTYM and low-power television station WLLS-LP. A new facility for both WNCC and WRDD was built in WNCC's city of license in Northern Cambria and full-service local programming resumed on those stations.

Vernal Enterprises declined an offer to purchase WCRO, which was then sold to the Greater Johnstown School District in January 1999 for $80,000. The station then moved out of its dilapidated building on Main Street and onto the high school campus at 222 Central Avenue, with all new digital, state-of-the-art equipment. Ralph Osmolinski, the district's Technology Coordinator, took over as general manager. Not long after WCRO's sale to Greater Johnstown School District, the station adopted Al Ham's Music of Your Life format, with local breaks being done by a student airstaff. The station ran in the manner of a commercial broadcast operation, and marketing itself as "The Voice of the Trojans" airing the district's high school football and boys' basketball games as part of its program offerings.

In October 2018, it was announced that Lightner Communications out of Altoona would take over the day-to-day operations of the station. It was also announced that WCRO planned to put on an FM translator to rebroadcast the signal into the Johnstown area on 102.9 FM. The translator signed on a year later in November 2019. With the addition of the translator, WCRO launched with a Christmas music format branding as "102.9/1230 WCRO The Christmas Station", a branding used on Lightner station WTRN in Tyrone. On January 1, 2020, WCRO launched their new soft adult contemporary format using the moniker "102.9/1230 WCRO Easy Favorites"; this format and branding was also shared with WTRN. The station ran jockless throughout the day and aired CBS News Radio updates at the top of every hour.

Upon ending its yearly Christmas music run, at midnight on January 2, 2024, WCRO switched formats from soft adult contemporary to oldies. The station branding was also changed to "Kool 102.9 WCRO". This move returns the oldies and Kool branding to the Johnstown market, although spelled different, it was used on WOWQ from 2000 to 2023. Until its demise, CBS News Radio aired at the top of every hour but instead of the full six-minute newscast, the station featured CBS newsbreaks which are less than a minute in length.

== Sports programming ==
WCRO is also known for broadcasting a variety of sports including Pittsburgh Penguins Hockey, Pittsburgh Pirates Baseball, Pitt Panthers Football and sports from the Greater Johnstown School District, including football and select basketball games.

== Christmas music ==
Since Lightner Communications took over as operator, WCRO has run a Christmas music format from the Monday before Thanksgiving until New Year's Day, like sister stations WTRN and WKFO. The station formerly competed with WOWQ for the holiday audience in the Johnstown area. However, when WOWQ switched its format to a simulcast of WOWY, out of State College, they did not continue the all Christmas format during the holiday season. As a result, WCRO is the only station in the Johnstown market that switches to an all Christmas format during the holiday season.
