= Fox 23 =

Fox 23 may refer to one of many television stations in the United States affiliated with the Fox television network:

== Current ==
- KAEF-DT2, a digital channel of KAEF-TV in Eureka, California
- KBSI in Cape Girardeau, Missouri
- KTMF-DT2, a digital channel of KTMF in Missoula, Montana
- KTUL-DT2, a digital channel of KTUL in Tulsa, Oklahoma (branded as Fox23)
- WATM-DT2, a digital channel of WATM-TV in Johnstown, Pennsylvania
  - Simulcast of WWCP-TV in Johnstown, Pennsylvania
- WGME-DT2, a digital channel of WGME-TV in Portland, Maine (branded as Fox 23)
- WHPM-LD in Hattiesburg, Mississippi
- WXXA-TV in Albany, New York

== Former ==
- KOKI-TV in Tulsa, Oklahoma (1986–2026)
- WPFO in Waterville, Maine (2003–2025)
