= WRDD (Ebensburg, Pennsylvania) =

Coordinates: 40°29′33.3″N 78°42′53.1″W

Ebensburg, Pennsylvania; United States
- Broadcast area: Johnstown, Pennsylvania
- Frequency: 1580 kHz
- Branding: The Cambria County Radio Network

Programming
- Format: Business talk

Ownership
- Owner: Vernal Enterprises, Inc.

History
- First air date: May 25, 1961 (as WEND)
- Last air date: October 16, 2010
- Former call signs: WEND (1961–1982); WAJE (1982–1985); WEBG (1985–1990)

Technical information
- Facility ID: 18058
- Class: D
- Power: 1,000 watts (daytime); 4 watts (nighttime)

WRDD was an American radio station, licensed to Ebensburg, Pennsylvania. WRDD operated at the federally assigned frequency of 1580 kHz, with a maximum power of 1,000 watts. The station ceased operations in 2010, and had its license cancelled on March 20, 2013.

== History ==
=== Beginnings as WEND ===
WRDD first went on the air in 1961 under the ownership of the Allegheny Mountain Network under the call letters WEND, and operated from studios and offices along North Center Avenue in downtown Ebensburg. For most of its early years, the station operated as the simulcast sister station of WEND-FM (now WRKW).

=== First sale ===
In April 1972, WEND was spun off to new owners Francis Krug and Robert Civis, the former being WEND's general manager under previous ownership. However, the station was sold again on January 1, 1977, to Great American Wireless Signal Company, Incorporated.

On August 10, 1982, WEND was spun off to Camcom Corporation, a company owned by Pittsburgh-based broadcasting engineer Roy J. Humphrey, and adopted the call letters WAJE. The station also moved from its longtime location on Center Avenue into the Cambria Savings Building, known today as the First United Federal Building.

In August 1985, the station was bought out of bankruptcy by Pittsburgh broadcast engineer Phillip Lenz who formed "Ebensburg Broadcast Group", and given the call letters WEBG. The station's studio and offices were moved to the Ebensburg Mini Mall.

By 1990, the station was sold to another owner, Eagle Radio, and became WRDD. Headed by J. Richard Lee and his daughter Jane, Eagle operated WRDD (and co-owned WNCC in Barnesboro) as simulcast outlets of WCRO, as that was the only station of the three left that had an existing studio building. The three stations identified themselves as "Eagle Radio" and broadcast a series of time-brokered religious programs throughout the day.

In 1996, Eagle Broadcasting put all three stations up for sale, after a series of competing religious-formatted FM stations and translators signed on the air. Both WRDD and WNCC were sold to Vernal Enterprises that year, with WCRO being spun off to the Greater Johnstown School District. The company, headed by Indiana County businessman Larry Schrecongost, moved the operations of WNCC back to Barnesboro, where it was joined by WRDD, and set up operations in a new studio. Both WNCC and WRDD simulcast a full-service format of oldies, news, and local sports, which Schrecongost had demonstrated success with on a station that he had acquired four years earlier, WTYM in Kittanning.

Both WNCC and WRDD were joined four years later by a co-owned FM sister station. Vernal Enterprises was able to secure another construction permit after the window to put WRHB on the air had already come and long gone. Taking call letters from a former oldies station licensed to suburban Altoona, the station signed on as WHPA, billing themselves as broadcasting from the "Heart of Pennsylvania". WHPA did not simulcast its two AM stations, but rather focused on a music-intensive classic hits blend of both oldies and classic rock.

In 2004 WRDD split from its simulcast with WNCC and changed their format to business news/talk.

WRDD was listed with the Federal Communications Commission (FCC) as being silent on Friday, September 3, 2010, with reasons being technical in nature. The tower of WRDD was found in need of repair and was slated to be dismantled due to safety issues. The tower was slated to be demolished around Thanksgiving, with a replacement tower to be purchased with a return to the air in the summer of 2011.

However, the FCC notified Vernal Enterprises in January 2012 that its license was being canceled after the station failed to return to the air by its ordered deadline of October 16, 2011, and no subsequent paperwork was filed by Vernal seeking an extension to its Special Temporary Authority application to remain silent. The tower along Tanner Road in Cambria Township was later demolished.
