= Tim Rigby =

Tim Rigby may refer to:

- Tim Rigby (politician), politician in Ontario, Canada
- Tim Rigby (sportscaster), sports anchor for WJAC-TV in Pennsylvania, USA
