= WJHT =

Radio station in Johnstown, Pennsylvania

Simulcasts WFBG Altoona
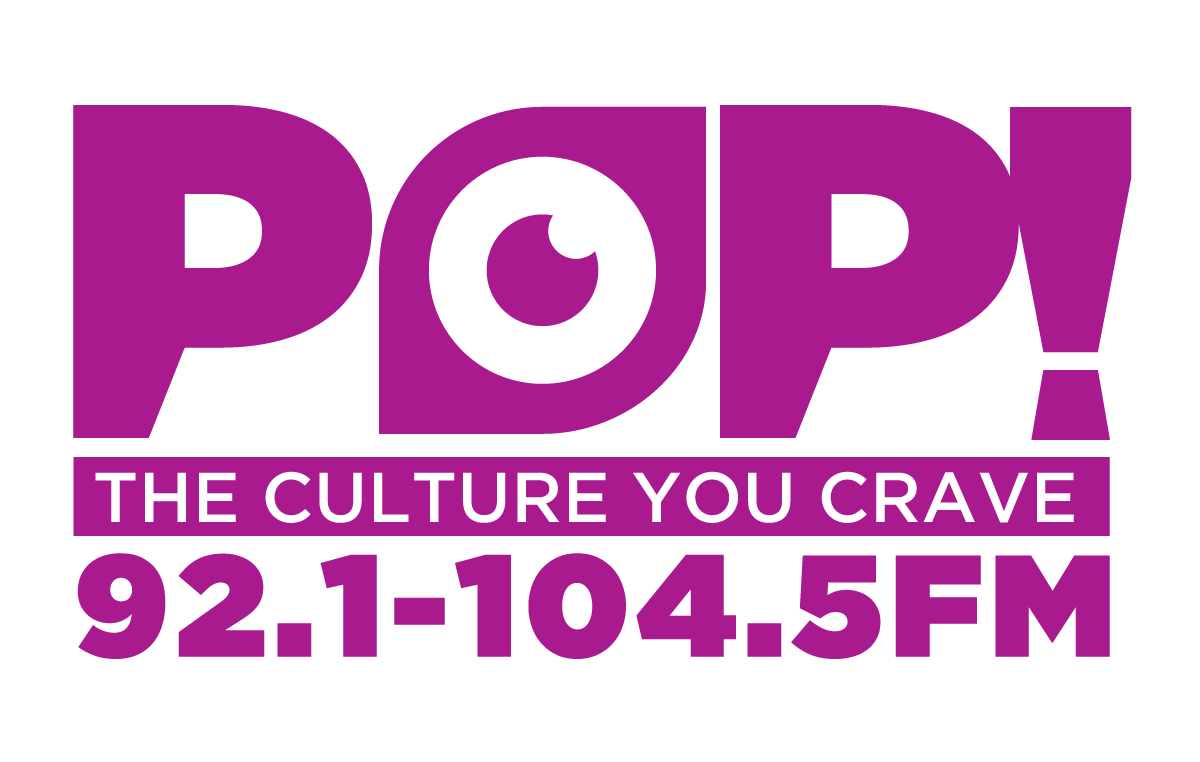
- Johnstown, Pennsylvania; United States
- Broadcast area: Laurel Highlands
- Frequency: 92.1 MHz
- Branding: Pop! Radio 92.1 and 104.5

Programming
- Language: English
- Format: Contemporary hit radio
- Affiliations: Compass Media Networks; Premiere Networks

Ownership
- Owner: Seven Mountains Media; (Southern Belle Media Family, LLC)
- Sister stations: WFGI-FM; WGGI; WKYE; WNTJ; WOWQ; WRKW

History
- First air date: September 1974
- Former call signs: WAAT (1974–1976); WFMM (1976–1980); WGLU (1980–2000); WQKK (2000–2005); WRKW (2005–2006); WYOT (2006)
- Call sign meaning: "Johnstown Hot" (former branding)

Technical information
- Licensing authority: FCC
- Facility ID: 64848
- Class: A
- ERP: 580 watts
- HAAT: 318 meters (1,043 ft)
- Transmitter coordinates: 40°22′15″N 78°59′02″W

Links
- Public license information: Public file; LMS
- Webcast: Listen live
- Website: mypopradio.com

WJHT (92.1 FM) is a radio station in Johnstown, Pennsylvania, United States. The station is owned by Seven Mountains Media, through licensee Southern Belle Media Family, LLC. This station was assigned the WJHT call sign by the Federal Communications Commission on July 13, 2006.

== History ==
=== As WARD-FM ===
The first station to use 92.1 MHz in Johnstown first signed on August 16, 1948, as WARD-FM, sister to WARD at AM 1490, and WARD-TV. As FM radio was still burgeoning and not very popular, it served as a simulcast outlet of its AM sister. This arrangement continued until the stations were sold in 1971 to the Jonel Construction Company (dba Cover Broadcasting). Shortly afterwards, the call signs for the AM station and the TV station were changed to WJNL, and the new owners were granted a construction permit to move WARD-FM to 96.5, which allowed a power increase to 50,000 watts. WJNL-FM 96.5 then signed on the air in 1973, and 92.1 went silent in 1972.

=== As WAAT ===
A construction permit for a new station on 92.1 MHz was acquired in 1973 by Community Broadcasters, which signed the new station on in September 1974 under the call sign WAAT, and under a religion-based format. The station's facilities moved from Franklin Street to Locust Street in Johnstown. W. Ronald Smith served as the company's president. This incarnation of the station lasted less than two years.

=== As WFMM ===
WAAT was sold August 23, 1976, to William C. Bland, owner of the Bland Group, which also owned WNCC in Barnesboro, about a half hour north of Johnstown. The call sign was switched to WFMM and the studios moved to 634 Main Street, and an easy listening format was adopted. Ownership would change again by the end of the decade.

=== As WGLU ===
WFMM was sold again on August 29, 1980, to Conemaugh Communications Corporation, a local company headed by Fred Glosser, whose family owned the Gee Bee discount department store chain. The studios were moved to 516 Main Street, and the call sign was switched to WGLU, with the format moving from easy listening to album rock. The station began to call itself "Glu 92", increased its power and embarked on a heavy advertising campaign. Towards the mid-’80s, WGLU started including more Top 40 tracks in its music rotation.

In August 1987, WGLU was sold to PAC Media, a company headed by Warren S. Diggins. One month later, the rock format was abandoned. Targeting younger listeners, WGLU became "Power 92", keeping the same call letters for the newly created Top 40/CHR format.

=== Changes since 2000 ===
On July 31, 2000, WGLU and sister station WQWK licensed out of Ebensburg, Pennsylvania swapped frequencies. WQWK prior to this flip was an active rock station programmed out of State College, Pennsylvania known as "QWK Rock". WQWK became "92.1 The Rock" and WGLU adjusted its name to include the entire frequency "Power 99.1" however still kept the heritage calls.

In March 2005, Dame Broadcasting sold all four properties to 2510 Associates out of Pittsburgh. Changes quickly occurred for "Power 99.1" the following Monday morning (three business days after the sale closed) they went on the air as "Hot 99" with the same air staff and format. WPRR in Altoona, "Hot 100" at the time began a simulcast of the "Hot Morning Show" with Jonathan Reed & Amy Wright from "Hot 99" each morning from 5:30am to 9am. Both stations shortly after the sale gave up their call signs for new call signs to fit the HOT moniker, WYOT, Johnstown & WWOT, Altoona. The WPRR call sign was salvaged for a sister 2510 Associate station.

Within a few months, WYOT "Hot 99" & WQWK "The Rock" were sold from 2510 Associates to Forever Broadcasting, Inc. WQWK forfeited its call sign and moniker "92.1 The Rock" to become WRKW "Rocky 92". After being under the rein of Forever Broadcasting for a few months, WYOT and WRKW flipped frequencies yet again to become "Rocky 99" and "Hot 92" respectively. Within a few more months of that change, WYOT "Hot 92" would go through another call sign switch, acquiring a new call sign from former Top 40 sister station in State College (that was taken off the air "Hot 103"). WJHT became the new call sign for "Hot 92". In the coming months, WWOT lost a few employees and decided to extend the simulcast from just morning drive to cover most of the day, 5am to 6pm and most weekend shifts. This prompted the station to re-image itself as "Hot 92 & Hot 100". Nights remained separate shows hosted by Chad Bennett on WJHT and Rob Z on WWOT.

In March 2008, Mitch Edwards, program director of WJHT for eight years and a staple to the station for more than a decade, left for sister station WFGI "Froggy 95" as co-host of the Morning Splash with Niki Wild. This move also encouraged Forever Broadcasting to make WJHT and WWOT a complete simulcast. Eliminating the dual night show split to being broadcast from the WJHT studio with Bennett as the host and replacing Edwards vacant position with Forever Broadcasting Altoona employee Paige Foxx.

Logo as Hot 92

From 2008 to 2014, there were many DJ and programming changes that occurred on Hot 92 and Hot 100. Despite these changes, both stations received high local appeal. In September 2014, Forever Media decided to end the simulcast between the two stations. They became separate stations again.

Beginning in March 2019, the station was known as Hot 92.1, including the whole frequency in its branding.

It was announced on October 12, 2022, that Forever Media was selling 34 stations, including WJHT and the entire Johnstown cluster, to State College-based Seven Mountains Media for $17.375 million. The deal closed on January 1, 2023.

On May 5, 2023, at 9:45 a.m., WJHT abruptly dropped the "Hot" format midway through "This Is What You Came For" by Calvin Harris and Rihanna and began stunting with construction noises, along with redirecting listeners to WNTJ (who would near-concurrently assume the music played under the "Hot" format with their flip to contemporary hit radio at that time), with a new format set to debut at a yet-unrevealed time.

On October 11, 2023, WJHT ended stunting and switched to a simulcast of Top 40/CHR-formatted WFBG 1290 AM Altoona, branded as "Pop! 92.1 and 104.5". On November 6, 2023 WNTJ switched its format to a simulcast of classic hits WOWY in State College, this resulted in WJHT becoming the default contemporary hit radio station again for the Johnstown area.

== The WJHT call sign ==
At one time, the WJHT call sign was used in Bayonne, New Jersey, and in State College, Pennsylvania, under two radio frequencies, the first under 107.9 under the moniker Hot 107.9 and the second under 103.1 under the moniker Hot 103.1.
