= WJAC-TV =

Television station in Johnstown, Pennsylvania

- Johnstown–Altoona–State College–; DuBois–Bedford, Pennsylvania; United States
- City: Johnstown, Pennsylvania
- Channels: Digital: 35 (UHF); Virtual: 6
- Branding: WJAC; 6 News; Alleghenies CW6 (6.4)

Programming
- Affiliations: 6.1: NBC; 6.4: CW+; for others, see § Subchannels

Ownership
- Owner: Sinclair Broadcast Group; (WJAC Licensee, LLC)
- Sister stations: WWCP-TV, WATM-TV

History
- First air date: September 15, 1949
- Former channel numbers: Analog: 13 (VHF, 1949–1952), 6 (VHF, 1952–2009); Digital: 34 (UHF, 2001–2019)
- Former affiliations: All secondary: CBS (1949–1953); DuMont (1949–1955); ABC (1949–1988)
- Call sign meaning: Johnstown Automotive Company

Technical information
- Licensing authority: FCC
- Facility ID: 73120
- ERP: 1,000 kW
- HAAT: 382 m (1,253 ft)
- Transmitter coordinates: 40°22′17″N 78°58′55″W
- Translator(s): see § Translators

Links
- Public license information: Public file; LMS
- Website: wjactv.com

WJAC-TV (channel 6) is a television station licensed to Johnstown, Pennsylvania, United States, serving the Johnstown–Altoona–State College market as an affiliate of NBC and The CW Plus. It is owned by Sinclair Broadcast Group, which provides certain services to Johnstown-licensed Fox affiliate WWCP-TV, channel 8 (owned by Sinclair partner company Cunningham Broadcasting) and Altoona-licensed ABC affiliate WATM-TV, channel 23 (owned by Palm Television, L.P. and operated by Cunningham Broadcasting under a local marketing agreement (LMA)) under a time brokerage agreement (TBA).

WJAC-TV's studios (which also house master control and some internal operations for WWCP-TV and WATM-TV) are located on Old Hickory Lane in Upper Yoder Township, and its transmitter is located northwest of the city in Laurel Ridge State Park along the Cambria–Westmoreland county line. WWCP-TV and WATM-TV maintain separate facilities on Lulay Street in the borough of Geistown (also with a Johnstown postal address).

== History ==
WJAC-TV first began its broadcasting operations on September 15, 1949, originally owned by the Johnstown Automotive Company along with WJAC radio (AM 1400, later WKGE at AM 850, and FM 95.5, now WKYE at FM 96.5). At the time, it was the third-smallest television station in the country market-wise to be granted a commercial license on or before December 31 behind CBS affiliate WNBF-TV in Binghamton, New York, and fellow NBC affiliate WICU-TV in Erie. It originally aired an analog signal on VHF channel 13 before moving to VHF channel 6 in 1952. Upon its sign-on, it aired programming from all four networks of the time (NBC, CBS, ABC, and DuMont). CBS disappeared from WJAC-TV's schedule when WARD-TV (channel 56, now Pittsburgh independent station WPKD-TV on channel 19) signed-on in 1953 followed by DuMont when it shut down network operations in 1955. However, the station continued to air a few ABC shows until WWPC-TV (channel 23), a satellite of Fox affiliate WWCP-TV (channel 8), became ABC affiliate WATM-TV in 1988.

In the 1960s, Johnstown Automotive sold the WJAC stations to the estate of Anderson H. Walters, the owner of The Tribune-Democrat, who held them until 1984 when tightened Federal Communications Commission (FCC) cross-ownership regulations forced the newspaper to sell off the radio stations. The Walters estate sold off the newspaper to MediaNews Group in 1987 but held on to Channel 6 until 1997 when it was sold to Sunrise Television. WJAC and new sister station WTOV-TV in the Steubenville, Ohio–Wheeling, West Virginia, market were sold to Cox Enterprises in 2000. The two stations and WPXI in Pittsburgh were occasionally marketed together as a result. WJAC-TV and WTOV were updated to WPXI's on-air graphics after being acquired by Cox, despite WPXI changing its own look in 2004. Most of the graphics introduced to WJAC-TV after the acquisition were used until October 2011, when WJAC-TV updated to WPXI's then-current look. When KYW-TV switched to CBS on September 10, 1995, WJAC officially became the longest-tenured NBC affiliate in the Commonwealth of Pennsylvania.

WJAC-TV gained a reputation for its locally produced programs at the station throughout the years. Scholastic Quiz, a game show featuring local high school students, and Seniors Today (a public affairs program targeted to those 65 and older) would become mainstays of the station's programming and make host Ron Lorence (who would later build WADJ, later WBHV, at 1330 AM and then buy WYSN-FM 101.7, now WOWQ in Somerset County) a local household name. The station was also one of the stations across the country to produce a local version of the children's TV show Romper Room. In the 1950s and 1960s, WJAC-TV's slogan was "Serving Millions from Atop the Alleghenies".

On September 15, 2009, WJAC-TV celebrated its 60th year of broadcasting. During that month, WJAC-TV aired several commercials advertising the anniversary. One featured a variation of the "Serving Millions from Atop the Alleghenies" slogan creating "Serving Millions Across the Alleghenies". This old slogan was used in various ways in the station's broadcasts and mixed with the station's then-current slogan "Coverage You Can Count On" to form "Coverage You Can Count On Across the Alleghenies" the year before.

On July 20, 2012, one day after Cox purchased four television stations in Jacksonville, Florida, and Tulsa, Oklahoma, from Newport Television, Cox put WJAC-TV, WTOV-TV, and sister stations in El Paso, Texas, and Reno, Nevada, plus several radio stations in medium to small markets, on the selling block. All four of the television stations were located in markets that were smaller than Tulsa. On February 25, 2013, Cox announced that it would sell the four stations to Sinclair Broadcast Group. The FCC granted its approval of the sale on April 29, and it was consummated on May 2. This made WJAC-TV a sister station to nearby WPGH-TV and WPMY in Pittsburgh though it is still connected to WPXI-TV through a news-share agreement.

On July 22, 2013, Horseshoe Curve Communications agreed to sell WWCP-TV to Cunningham Broadcasting for $12 million. The Sinclair Broadcast Group was to operate the station through shared services and joint sales agreements. However, the majority of Cunningham's stock is held by the Smith family (owners and founders of Sinclair). As a result, Sinclair would have effectively owned WWCP as well. As WWCP's long-standing local marketing agreement to operate WATM-TV was part of the deal, it would have resulted in the major commercial television stations in the market being controlled by just two companies. It would have essentially made WJAC-TV, WWCP, and WATM all sister stations and expanded on their existing news share arrangement (see below). However, on February 20, 2014, Horseshoe Curve informed the FCC that the sale of WWCP had fallen through.

== Subchannel history ==
=== WJAC-DT2 ===
The Retro Television Network began airing on WJAC-TV's second digital subchannel in the late December 2008. Along with then-sister station WPXI, WJAC-TV 6.2 transitioned to MeTV at midnight on June 13, 2011, immediately following an episode of Ellery Queen, at which point the channel was switched to the MeTV feed for the start of Hogan's Heroes. Sister station WTOV continued to air RTV until January 16, 2012. Before its closure in December 2008, WJAC-TV carried NBC Weather Plus on the second digital subchannel. The regular changes in WJAC's subchannel over its first few years reflect the decisions made internally about how to best make use of the new programming options afforded by Digital OTA broadcast.

On September 1, 2022, MeTV was replaced by Charge!.

=== WJAC-DT4 ===
WJAC-TV's fourth digital subchannel serves as the market's CW affiliate, branded on-air as Alleghenies CW6. All programming on WJAC-DT4 is received through The CW's programming feed for smaller media markets, The CW Plus, which provides a set schedule of syndicated programming acquired by The CW for broadcast during time periods outside of the network's regular programming hours; however, Sinclair handles local advertising and promotional services for the subchannel.

On August 21, 2019, Sinclair announced in a letter to the National Cable Television Cooperative that WJAC-TV's fourth subchannel would switch from TBD to The CW Plus, giving The CW its first full-time affiliate in the Johnstown–Altoona market. The affiliation was launched on September 16 at 6 a.m. Prior to this, Pittsburgh's WPCW—which itself was a Johnstown station for much of its history—served the market via cable. Through aggressive statistical multiplexing, CW+ programming on WJAC-DT4 is broadcast in 720p high definition (albeit in a highly-compressed variation of that video resolution). On September 18, WJAC-DT4 adopted its current "Alleghenies CW6" branding.

== News operation ==
In the late-1960s and 1970s, WJAC had a fifteen-minute news and weather show weekday afternoons at 1 known as The News Today. Its 6 o'clock newscast was known as The News Tonight and the 11 p.m. broadcast was entitled 11th Hour News. The weather segment aired first and was titled "Weather in Motion" with its own sound and graphics, and was hosted (at least for the 1 p.m. broadcast) by Chick Young. The sports segment had a separate theme and was called "Sports Nitecap". Their weekday morning newscast began as a half-hour broadcast at 6:30 in 1985. In 1987, TCI Cable (now Comcast) in Centre County began producing a WJAC newscast, known as the Centre County Report, specifically targeted to that area.

On January 14, 2008, WJAC entered into a news share agreement with WWCP and WATM. This station then began to produce WWCP's nightly prime time show and reduced the program to 35 minutes on weeknights while remaining a half-hour on weekends. The newscast, still known as Fox 8 News at 10, now originates from a secondary set at WJAC's facility on Old Hickory Lane in Upper Yoder Township. It features a separate news anchor on weeknights, who does not appear on WJAC, in addition to a different music and graphics package from broadcasts seen on the NBC outlet. Since WJAC has prior commitments with local news and weather cut-ins during Today, WATM offers taped news updates that are seen Tuesday through Saturday mornings (at 25 and 55 minutes past the hour) during Good Morning America. From January 2008 until March 2011, WJAC simulcast its nightly newscast at 11 on WATM under the ABC 23 News branding.

WJAC-TV officially changed its news branding from WJAC-TV News to 6 News on October 25, 2011. This change came only three years after the switch from Channel 6 News. In addition to the new branding, WJAC updated their on-air graphics and theme music to those of its former sister station, WPXI, in Pittsburgh. Then, in July 2012, WJAC became the first station in the market to broadcast local news in full high definition. In January 2016, to reflect the station's ownership by Sinclair, WJAC-TV stopped using WPXI's former on-air look and updated their package and music to those used by other Sinclair stations. WTOV-TV already made a similar change in 2014.

In addition to its main studios, WJAC-TV also operates bureaus in Altoona (on Beale Avenue), State College (on West College Avenue/PA 26) and DuBois (on East DuBois Avenue/PA 255; building is shared with WIFT 102.1 FM). In May 2022, WJAC-TV closed its Altoona bureau in a cost cutting measure. However, the station maintains a photographer based in Altoona for that area. The station also consolidated their State College bureau, and still maintains news reporters and a photographer there.

=== Notable former on-air staff ===
- Bill Brown – anchor (1983–2015)
- Marty Radovanic – anchor (1974–2017)
- Tim Rigby – sports director and executive producer, later an anchor (1981–2022)

== Technical information ==
=== Subchannels ===
The station's signal is multiplexed:

Subchannels of WJAC-TV
Channel	Res.	Short name	Programming
6.1	1080i	NBC	NBC
6.2	480i	Charge!	Charge!
6.3	480i	Comet	Comet
6.4	720p	CW+	The CW Plus
6.5	480i	TheNest	The Nest

=== Analog-to-digital conversion ===
WJAC-TV shut down its analog signal, over VHF channel 6, on June 12, 2009, the official date on which full-power television stations in the United States transitioned from analog to digital broadcasts under federal mandate. The station's digital signal remained on its pre-transition UHF channel 34, using virtual channel 6.

The nearby mountain ridges had prevented most of Altoona and all of State College from receiving the analog signal; conversely, many of Pittsburgh's outer-ring eastern and Westmoreland County suburbs actually got a grade B signal from WJAC, which in some cases, was superior to that of Pittsburgh NBC affiliate WPXI.

Because the audio portion of VHF channel 6 was transmitted at 87.75 MHz, it was possible to listen to the television station on most FM car radios (or any standard FM radio for that matter). This was a feature frequently employed by area residents. However, this is no longer an option after the digital conversion.

=== Translators ===
- WJAC-TV (DRT) 33 Altoona
- WJAC-TV (DRT) 28 Bedford
- WJAC-TV (DRT) 26 DuBois
- W26EQ-D State College
- W29DH-D Moorefield, WV

== Out-of-market coverage ==
WJAC-TV is carried on various cable systems in several counties that are located outside of the Johnstown–Altoona market. These counties include Armstrong, eastern Butler, Clarion, Mifflin and the central to eastern portion of Westmoreland. During the 1990s, WJAC was available on cable in portions of Warren County, despite that county being a part of the Erie market. In Maryland, it is carried in Allegany County. In West Virginia, it is carried in Petersburg (93 miles (150 km) away), Dorcas, Moorefield and Keyser. WJAC-TV is also broadcast over-the-air on a low-powered repeater, W29DH-D, in Moorefield, West Virginia. This repeater is owned by Valley TV Cooperative.
