= WNPA =

WNPA may refer to:

- WNPA-LP, a low-power radio station (102.5 FM) licensed to serve Canton, Ohio, United States
- WPKD-TV, a television station (channel 11, virtual 19) licensed to serve Jeannette, Pennsylvania, United States, which held the call sign WNPA from 1997 to 2006
