= WGGI (AM) =

Radio station in Somerset, Pennsylvania

Coordinates: 40°01′31″N 79°05′42″W

Simulcasting WFGI-FM, Johnstown
- Somerset, Pennsylvania; United States
- Broadcast area: Johnstown, Pennsylvania
- Frequency: 990 kHz
- Branding: Froggy 95.5

Programming
- Format: Country
- Affiliations: Compass Media Networks; Westwood One

Ownership
- Owner: Seven Mountains Media; (Southern Belle Media Family, LLC)
- Sister stations: WFGI-FM; WJHT; WKYE; WNTJ; WOWQ; WRKW

History
- First air date: January 15, 1951 (as WVSC)
- Former call signs: WVSC (1951–2004); WNTW (2004–2013); WLLI (2013–2017); WNTI (2017–2023)
- Call sign meaning: Froggy

Technical information
- Licensing authority: FCC
- Facility ID: 56364
- Class: D
- Power: 10,000 watts day; 100 watts night
- Translator: 103.5 W278CR (Somerset)

Links
- Public license information: Public file; LMS
- Webcast: Listen live
- Website: froggy95johnstown.com

WGGI (990 kHz) is a AM country radio station in Somerset, Pennsylvania, United States. The station broadcasts with a maximum output power of 10,000 watts during the day and greatly reduces power to 100 watts at night, using a two-tower directional antenna system. The station is a simulcast of WFGI-FM in Johnstown, Pennsylvania.

== History ==
=== Beginnings as WVSC ===
The station signed on, as WVSC, on January 15, 1951, and was the first radio station located in Somerset County. Licensed to Somerset Broadcasting Co., the owners were T. H. Oppegard, President and General Manager, and Carl R. Lee, Sales Manager and Chief Engineer. Sportscaster Mike Patrick began his career at the station. The call sign stood for "We're the Voice of Somerset County". The station for many years programmed a full-service format of news, sports, and talk, much of it local. WVSC was also the longtime local voice of ABC News Radio, including Paul Harvey. The station was joined by an FM sister station, WVSC-FM 97.7, on June 15, 1966.

=== Purchase by Ridge Communications ===
On May 11, 1970, WVSC-AM-FM were purchased by Ridge Communications, headed by I. Richard Adams. It would be under Ridge Communications' ownership that WVSC would see its biggest growth.

WVSC managed to survive an aggressive new AM competitor, WADJ, which came on the air in 1981. That same year, Ridge Communications decided to expand its coverage area by successfully applying for a license for a new AM station northwest of Somerset in Indiana County. However, Ridge was unable to raise the capital necessary to put the new WRID (1520 AM) in Homer City on the air, and the construction permit and license were sold to the newly formed Raymark Broadcasting, of Indiana. That station is known today as WCCS, which coincidentally was the original call sign for competing station WOWQ, which had given up the WCCS call sign for WWZE.

In the mid-1980s, WVSC, which had been a daytime-only station for many years, successfully petitioned the Federal Communications Commission (FCC) for limited nighttime power. WVSC began operating at 75 watts at night by the end of the decade.

=== Sale to Forever Broadcasting ===
In 1997, Ridge Communications decided to sell WVSC-AM-FM to Forever Broadcasting of Altoona, which had been looking for an FM property to expand its popular "Froggy" branded country music format to the Johnstown area. WVSC remained the same, while WVSC-FM took on a new call sign and the country format and became known as "Froggy 98", the same moniker as its flagship station in Altoona. In 2004, WVSC gave up the final trace of its historic call sign when it began simulcasting the news/talk/sports format of its sister operation, WNTJ in Johnstown, and took on the call sign WNTW.

=== WLLI ===
WNTW continued to operate under the news/talk/sports format. However, the simulcast was expected to end by the end of 2007, as Forever Broadcasting agreed to sell WNTJ's AM 850 signal (which eventually became WKGE) to Michigan-based Birach Broadcasting Corporation for $230,000. That sale was completed on April 10, 2008. As the sale included only the transmitting facility and license but not the programming or format, Forever Broadcasting moved the WNTJ format and call sign to the former WPRR at AM 1490 (which, coincidentally, was the original frequency for the 850 facility). That station was owned by 2510 Licenses LLC but operated by Forever Broadcasting through a local marketing agreement until Forever Broadcasting reacquired the frequency outright at the end of April 2011. On January 9, 2013, the station changed its call sign from WNTW to WLLI. With this change, the simulcast with WNTJ was ended and the station became known as 990 The Fanatic, with programming from CBS Sports Radio.

=== WNTI ===
In the spring of 2016, the simulcast with WNTJ returned. The station still aired Pittsburgh Pirates baseball, Pittsburgh Penguins hockey, Pittsburgh Steelers football, and local high school football as a part of the simulcast. On January 16, 2017, WLLI changed its call sign to WNTI.

WNTI was until 2015 the FM station of Centenary College in Hackettstown, New Jersey. The station was taken over by WXPN, the University Pennsylvania station. The call sign was changed to WXPJ.

=== WGGI ===
It was announced on October 12, 2022 that Forever Media was selling 34 stations, including WNTI, WNTJ, and the entire Johnstown cluster, to Seven Mountains Media, owned by Forever chairman Kerby Confer's daughter Kristin Cantrell. The deal closed on January 1, 2023.

On May 4, 2023, WNTI changed its call sign to WGGI. The next day, WGGI changed its format from news/talk to a simulcast of Froggy-branded WFGI-FM 95.5.
