= WRKW =

Radio station in Ebensburg, Pennsylvania

Coordinates: 40.411°N 78.774°W

- Ebensburg, Pennsylvania; United States
- Broadcast area: Laurel Highlands
- Frequency: 99.1 MHz
- Branding: Rocky 99.1

Programming
- Format: Classic rock
- Affiliations: United Stations Radio Networks; Penn State Sports Network; Pittsburgh Steelers Audio Network; Penguins Radio Network

Ownership
- Owner: Seven Mountains Media; (Southern Belle Media Family, LLC)
- Sister stations: WFGI-FM; WGGI; WJHT; WKYE; WNTJ; WOWQ

History
- First air date: July 15, 1962 (as WEND-FM at 103.9)
- Former call signs: WEND-FM (1962–1972); WIYQ (1972–1993); WQKK (1993–2000); WGLU (2000–2005); WYOT (2005–2006)
- Former frequencies: 103.9 MHz (1962–1966)
- Call sign meaning: "Rocky"

Technical information
- Licensing authority: FCC
- Facility ID: 64845
- Class: B
- ERP: 50,000 watts
- HAAT: 152 meters (499 ft)
- Translator: 93.9 W230BK (Johnstown)

Links
- Public license information: Public file; LMS
- Webcast: Listen live
- Website: rocky99.com

WRKW (99.1 FM) is a commercial radio station in Ebensburg, Pennsylvania, United States. Owned by Seven Mountains Media, through licensee Southern Belle Media Family, LLC, it maintains studios and offices at 109 Plaza Drive in Johnstown. It operates at the federally-assigned, effective radiated power of 50,000 watts, and transmits from a facility at 480 Tower Road in Summerhill, Pennsylvania.

To boost its signal, WRKW simulcasts on W230BK, a 175-watt translator on 93.9 FM that is licensed to serve Johnstown. The station is related to WRKY-FM "Rocky 104.9" in Altoona, Pennsylvania; both are owned by Seven Mountains Media.

== History ==
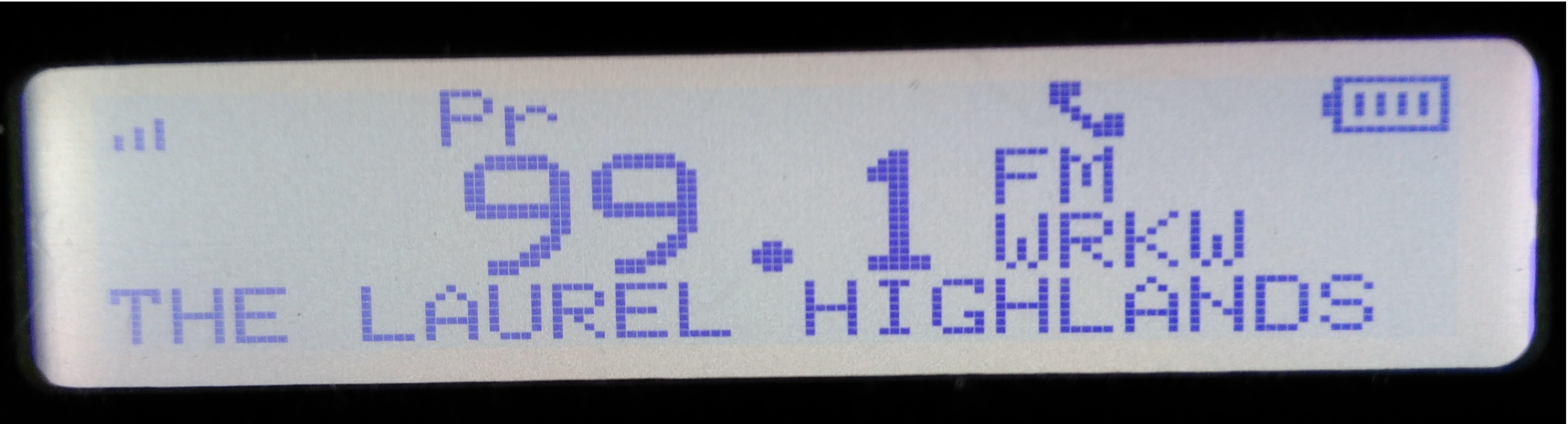
WRKW on a SPARC HD Radio with RDS.

=== The beginning ===
For much of its existence, WRKW was known as WIYQ, first signing on the air as WEND-FM on July 15, 1962, from studios on Center Street in downtown Ebensburg, its licensed community. The station, along with WEND (1580 AM) was founded by Cary H. Simpson, who also founded the Allegheny Mountain Network based in Tyrone just 11 years before. This station originally broadcast on the frequency of 103.9 FM, but moved to 99.1 in 1966, which brought a power increase to 10,000 watts.

Years later, as Johnstown's economy prospered, the station moved to 1240 Scalp Avenue in Richland Township, where it became more of a regional station serving West Central Pennsylvania.

Throughout its existence, WIYQ went through a series of different formats, from middle-of-the-road to a brief period of top-40 in the late-1980s programmed by John Harlow who also did mornings with Tor Michaels. Matt Swayne did middays, Brian Tercek did afternoons and Dave Snyder did nights.

What WIYQ particularly became well known for was a local polka show broadcast every Sunday afternoon. "Jo-Jo's Polka Swing" debuted in 1972, and remained a staple of WIYQ's programming for twenty years, becoming one of the most successful programs on the station, with listeners calling in from as far away as Pittsburgh's eastern suburbs. Joe Vesnesky, a Glendale High School History Teacher by trade who also did sports play-by-play for another area station, hosted the show, gaining an especially strong following because of his mastery of the native Polish language and the powerful signal of WIYQ, which reached 27 counties in three states.

Air personality "Country Ron" took over the morning show at WIYQ in 1974 and soon developed a huge following among the area's country music fans and hosted several live broadcasts from the nearby Cambria County Fairgrounds. Ron Kauffman graduated from Glendale High School and had been a student of Joe Vesnesky. Ron once introduced Kitty Wells, the 'Queen of Country Music' to the stage at a local high school.

=== The end of an era ===
After 31 years, the station's history as WIYQ came to a sad end as the station was sold to TMZ Broadcasting of State College for $440,000. Gone were the popular oldies music and Jo-Jo's Polka Swing, which would resurface years later at a 5,000 watt AM radio station in Philipsburg.

WIYQ then became known as WQKK, or "Quick Rock", operating as a satellite of rocker WQWK in State College. The station was purchased by TMZ as part of a strategic move to increase its presence in Johnstown and Altoona. WQWK's weaker signal at 97.1 did not have the ability to reach Johnstown at all, while barely touching Altoona. The much-stronger 99.1 signal helped WQWK penetrate these areas. WQKK and WGLU would later swap frequencies, with WQKK moving to the much weaker 92.1 signal, while WGLU took over 99.1, branding itself "Power 99.1".

=== 92.1 The Rock ===
After the move to 92.1, WQKK rebranded itself "The Rock", and played a mix of classic and new rock. WQKK aired specialty shows on weeknights such as "The '80s at 8", "Led Before Bed" (a three-song segment of Led Zeppelin airing weeknights at 9pm), and "Mandatory Metallica" at 11pm.

=== Rocky 99 ===
Former logo

In 2005, both WQKK and WGLU were purchased by Forever Broadcasting (who along with a subsidiary company own most of the commercial radio stations in the Johnstown market) then reverted to their original frequencies so the CHR station could serve the populated areas, and 99.1 could reach a wider portion of the market and took the WRKW call sign from 92.1, and a new name, Rocky 99. At the same time, the primarily rock-based station then began a shift within its format, mostly playing classic rock and oldies songs over 30 years old, while still occasionally playing newer rock, similar to the former 92.1 The Rock. This changed in November 2014 when the station began airing Westwood One's Rock 2.0 format, playing rock from the 1990s to today while still occasionally playing older music and airing Alice Cooper at night. In June 2016, Rocky 99 became a full classic rock station with Westwood One's Classic Rock providing the programming. In May 2018, the format was tweaked to classic hard rock delivered by Westwood One's Classic Rock X. This format was developed by owner, Forever Media, in partnership with Westwood One and is heard on other Forever classic rock stations. Despite the Westwood One affiliation, they still aired a local morning show and Nights with Alice Cooper. As of August 2018, the name was adjusted to include the whole frequency, Rocky 99.1.

It was announced on October 12, 2022, that Forever Media was selling 34 stations, including WRKW and the entire Johnstown cluster, to State College-based Seven Mountains Media for $17.375 million. The deal closed on January 1, 2023.

When Seven Mountains Media revamped the Johnstown market in early May 2023, Rocky 99.1 ended their usage of Westwood One Classic Rock X and began programming a traditional in house classic rock format.

== Sports programming ==
WRKW is a part of the Pittsburgh Steelers Radio Network, carrying pre-game and post-game coverage along with the games themselves. The Steelers games are primarily run by legendary board-op, John Walko, of Windber. John has been running sporting events in the Johnstown area for parts of three decades. Also to note, John did mornings on WIYQ.

Beginning in the fall of 2023, WRKW added local high school football and Penn State football to its sports lineup. This coverage was previously on WOWQ but was moved due to WOWQ switching to a simulcaster of the WOWY Radio network, originating from WOWY 103.1 FM in State College.

== Sources ==
- 1963 Broadcasting Yearbook
- 1965 Broadcasting Yearbook
