= Bill Brown (news anchor) =

American journalist

Bill Brown is a former morning news anchor for WJAC-TV, the NBC network affiliated television station serving the Johnstown-Altoona-State College, Pennsylvania metropolitan area.

Brown began as a journalist for the Latrobe Bulletin and the Greensburg Tribune-Review. He joined WJAC in 1982 as a weekend reporter and weatherman. He became the anchor for the NewsCenter 6 at Noon weekday broadcast in 1984. In 1985, he became the anchorman for the station's new Sunrise news broadcast. He holds both of these positions today.

In 2002, he came under controversy when he said profanities on the air. On a live promo before the noon news, Brown did not realize he was on the air. When he realized he was, he uttered, "Oh shit!" The video cut to black, but his audio was left on, and he was heard saying, "I'm tired of this fucking shit!" Brown apologized for his choice of words and took a self-imposed leave of absence from the station. The Federal Communications Commission (FCC) chose not to suspend him further for his actions.

On February 2, 2015, Brown announced that he would be retiring at the end of the month. He retired on February 25, concluding his 32-year career.
