= WNTJ =

Radio station in Johnstown, Pennsylvania

Simulcasting WOWY State College
- Johnstown, Pennsylvania; United States
- Frequency: 1490 kHz
- Branding: WOWY Radio

Programming
- Format: Classic hits

Ownership
- Owner: Seven Mountains Media; (Southern Belle Media Family, LLC)
- Sister stations: WFGI-FM; WGGI; WJHT; WKYE; WOWQ; WRKW

History
- First air date: August 1946
- Former call signs: WARD (1946–1970); WJNL (1970–1990); WKQS (1990–1991); WNTJ (1991–2004); WSPO (2004–2005); WPRR (2005–2008)
- Call sign meaning: "News Talk Johnstown" (previous format)

Technical information
- Licensing authority: FCC
- Facility ID: 15327
- Class: C
- Power: 1,000 watts unlimited
- Transmitter coordinates: 40°19′25.27″N 78°53′48.09″W
- Translator: 104.5 W283CX (Johnstown)

Links
- Public license information: Public file; LMS
- Webcast: Listen Live
- Website: wowyonline.com

WNTJ (1490 AM) is a radio station in Johnstown, Pennsylvania, United States. The station, established in 1946, is currently owned by Seven Mountains Media, through licensee Southern Belle Media Family, LLC.

Until May 1, 2023, WNTJ broadcast a news/talk radio format including Pittsburgh Pirates baseball, Pittsburgh Penguins hockey, Pittsburgh Steelers football and select Fox News Radio programming.

The station was assigned the WNTJ call sign by the Federal Communications Commission on May 8, 2008. Prior to 2008, this station was home to ESPN Radio affiliate WPRR, and before that, was the first home for WNTJ.

== History: beginnings as WARD ==
First coming on the air in 1948, this station began as WARD. Over the next decade, WARD would be joined by an FM station: WARD-FM 96.5 (now WFGI-FM at 95.5), and a UHF television station: WARD-TV channel 56 (now on virtual channel 19 as WPKD-TV in Pittsburgh).

For many years, these three stations would be under common ownership, and operating as affiliates of the CBS radio and television networks. The call letters for all three were changed from WARD to WJNL following its acquisition by Johnstown-based Jonel Construction Company in 1970. This station was typical of one owned with a TV station, programming a full-service format with heavy emphasis on local news. This business model continued into the start of the 1980s, when the organization fell onto hard times. It began with the downturn of WJNL-TV, which lost its CBS affiliation to WTAJ-TV after the Johnstown and Altoona TV markets were merged into one. The radio stations, already crippled by the fall of Johnstown's lucrative coal and steel industries, were unable to sustain the TV station's sudden drop in revenue, and the TV station was eventually sold off, leaving WJNL-AM-FM to continue on.

The radio stations continued to operate until the end of the decade, when both were acquired by Pennsylvania Broadcast Associates (dba Dame Media). WJNL-FM underwent a format change and WJNL was reduced to simulcasting its FM sister 100 percent until a plan could be formulated for its future.

WJNL then became WNTJ, programming a format of full-service news and talk. The station would maintain this format for approximately a decade until it was purchased in 2004 by Forever Broadcasting from Clear Channel Communications (who bought out Dame Media back in 1998).

Forever relocated WNTJ's talk format and call letters to their 850 kHz signal, turning the 1490 signal into an ESPN Radio affiliate - first recycling the WSPO call sign originally used on the 850 signal, then as WPRR with a sale of the station to 2510 Broadcasting.

Logo before translator sign on

In November 2007, a deal was reached to sell WPRR plus co-owned stations WCCL, WBHV, and WLKH to Forever Broadcasting Inc. (Carol Logan, president) for a reported combined sale price of $3 million. However, the FCC rejected approval for the deal, citing Forever's influence in the removal of Johnstown and its surrounding markets from the Arbitron ratings system. As a result, 2510 Licenses LLC (Nicholas Galli, managing member) continued to own all four stations, though it allowed Forever to continue operating the stations through a local marketing agreement. Just over three years later, in February 2011, 2510 Licenses LLC sold WNTJ, WCCL, and WLKH outright to Forever Broadcasting. This time, however, the FCC granted approval for the deal, which was completed on April 30. Forever has since moved back the WNTJ format and call letters back to the 1490 kHz signal.

It was announced on October 12, 2022, that Forever Media was selling 34 stations, including WNTJ, WNTI, and the entire Johnstown cluster, to State College-based Seven Mountains Media for $17.375 million. The deal closed on January 1, 2023.

On May 1, 2023, WNTJ dropped its news/talk format and began stunting with a loop of "Pop" by NSYNC, promoting a new format, contemporary hit radio as "Pop! Radio" (widely expected at the time of stunting to be the eventual format, as a majority of Seven Mountains markets had such a format, straight down to stunting before launch with the exact same song; indeed, the station would be a near-exact simulcast of WFBG) following on May 5, 2023, at 10am; this would effectively assume the format of sister station WJHT, who would near-concurrently drop their own format less than 15 minutes earlier (to the point the change was signaled on the station's webstream by the stream briefly picking up the feed of WNTJ). This resulted in WCCS the only available news/talk station in Johnstown.

On October 12, 2023, WJHT began simulcasting WFBG and WNTJ. In response to this, on November 6, 2023, WNTJ began simulcasting classic hits-formatted WOWY from State College, making it the second station in the Johnstown cluster to air the format alongside WOWQ (101.7 FM). This move gives WOWY better coverage in the city of Johnstown which 101.7 does not cover well due to transmitting 15 miles away from the city.

== Translator ==
Call sign	Frequency	City of license	FID	ERP (W)	Class	Transmitter coordinates	FCC info
W283CX	104.5 FM	Johnstown, Pennsylvania	201233	150	D	40°19′45.3″N 78°53′53.1″W	LMS
