= WLKE =

- Gallitzin, Pennsylvania; United States
- Broadcast area: Altoona, Pennsylvania
- Frequency: 93.5 MHz

Programming
- Format: Christian Radio
- Affiliations: K-Love

Ownership
- Owner: Educational Media Foundation

History
- First air date: 2000
- Former call signs: WHPA (1998–2011); WCGJ (2011–2014)
- Call sign meaning: Variation of K-Love (station name)

Technical information
- Licensing authority: FCC
- Facility ID: 82271
- Class: A
- ERP: 1250 watts
- HAAT: 221.5 meters (727 feet)
- Transmitter coordinates: 40°29′36″N 78°32′31″W

Links
- Public license information: Public file; LMS
- Webcast: Listen Live
- Website: www.klove.com

WLKE (93.5 FM) is an American, Christian radio station serving Altoona, Pennsylvania, from Gallitzin, its city of license. WLKE operates at an effective radiated power of 1,250 Watts. The station is owned by Educational Media Foundation.

== History ==
The groundwork for WHPA actually was laid in the late 1980s, when a construction permit to build a new FM station was issued to William C. Bland, the owner of Bland Radio Group, Inc., which was then the licensee of WNCC in Barnesboro, Pennsylvania. The station was assigned the frequency of 94.3, a class A power output of 3,000 watts and the call letters WRHB-FM.

However, this station would never sign on the air under Bland's ownership. WNCC was turned over to a bankruptcy receiver (local attorney Mark Gregg) in 1990, forcing its sale to J. Richard Lee (dba Eagle Radio, Inc.) in 1992. The FM construction permit was allowed to expire in the meantime, with Eagle Radio focusing its religious radio format efforts on WNCC and its two other simulcast stations, WRDD and WCRO.

Those three stations were sold in 1996. Vernal Enterprises purchased WRDD and WNCC, immediately changing their formats from religion to full-service oldies and talk. WCRO was spun off to the Greater Johnstown School District. Vernal Enterprises successfully applied for the FM construction permit that had been allowed to expire before.

Construction of WHPA had encountered a delay when Anthony F. Renda, of Renda Broadcasting had also applied at around this same time to put a new station of his own on the air in Brookville, Pennsylvania, about 50 miles northwest in Jefferson County. In order to allow the 25,000 watt station to operate, frequency shuffles had to take place among several other stations in the area, including the new construction permit for WHPA. The station was reassigned a new license to operate at 93.5 FM.

WHPA had initially planned to go on the air on Valentine's Day, February 14, 1999, as a promotional gimmick for its new moniker "93.5 The Heart". However, the Brookville radio station project pushed the actual on-air date to the summer of the following year.

Following WHPA's debut, this station and its two AM sisters moved to the First United Federal Building in downtown Ebensburg. In 2006, after longtime flagship station WFBG did not renew its contract, WHPA became the new flagship for the Altoona Curve, an affiliation that lasted three seasons.

Also that same year, Vernal Enterprises applied to the FCC for another construction permit to move WHPA's signal closer to Altoona by building a new tower in the Cambria/Blair County border town of Gallitzin, almost doubling its previous coverage. With the move came the change of its city of license from Northern Cambria, Pennsylvania to Gallitzin.

Vernal Enterprises sold WHPA to Radio Partners, LLC, which was approved on November 22, 2010.

On February 15, 2011, WHPA changed their call letters to WCGJ. On February 1, 2014, the station's call sign was changed to WLKE.

Effective January 17, 2017, Radio Partners sold WLKE and sister station WLSF to Educational Media Foundation for $400,000.
