= WNCC (AM) =

Coordinates: 40°40′47.2″N 78°44′25.1″W

Barnesboro, Pennsylvania; United States
- Broadcast area: Northern Cambria; Johnstown, Pennsylvania
- Frequency: 950 kHz
- Branding: The Cambria County Radio Network

Programming
- Format: Classic hits

Ownership
- Owner: Vernal Enterprises, Inc.

History
- First air date: October 15, 1950
- Last air date: 2006
- Call sign meaning: Northern Cambria County

Technical information
- Facility ID: 18059
- Class: D
- Power: 500 watts (daytime); 29 watts (night)

WNCC was a commercial AM radio station, licensed to the Borough of Northern Cambria, Pennsylvania. WNCC operated on a federally assigned frequency of 950 kHz with a maximum power output of 500 watts.

== History ==
WNCC first signed on the air back in 1950, licensed to the coal-mining community of Barnesboro (which would later merge with Spangler to form Northern Cambria) and like many small stations of its day, served the local area with a combination of local news, sports, and music. The station first operated from the American Legion post in Barnesboro and under the ownership of North Cambria Broadcasters, Inc. William Thomas served as the station's first general manager.

The station first changed hands in January 1960 when it was sold to WNCC Inc., a company headed by J. Howard Bair. Studios were then moved to 803 Maple Avenue. Ownership changed again on December 26, 1975, when the station was purchased by Bland Group, Inc., a company headed by William Bland. Bland brought major market radio know-how to Barnesboro. He had been successful in radio sales at KQV in Pittsburgh and at WLS in Chicago. Bland had also done well as a disc jockey in the 1960s, working on Mexican Radio at XEMO in Tijuana and, most notably, at WPOP in Hartford, Connecticut.

Bland's strategy for the Barnesboro station included terms like "Serving Coal Country" and "Your Radio Station, WNCC." With a strong focus on local news and information, the top 40 records being spun by "The Real" Johnny Dial and Tom "Rambling" Scantling were secondary to the emphasis on being a local station. Bland's eureka moment was deciding to have the station sound as if it were broadcasting exclusively for the local coal miners and their families. News Director Pat Cloonan ended up with several Associated Press awards for small market news. It was a winning strategy. The 500 watt station was a powerhouse under Bland's leadership; no other station could touch it in Northern Cambria and Southern Clearfield counties. Dial and Deal and Radio Blackout Bingo were two incredibly successful mid-morning programs. In 1980 studios were moved to 1015 Philadelphia Avenue, formerly a funeral home, which later became known as "Broadcast House."

During the final years of Bland Group's ownership, WNCC successfully applied for a construction permit for a new FM station. The permit for 94.3 WRHB-FM was issued in the late 1980s, but as it turned out, would never sign on the air under Bland's ownership. The demise of the coal business in Cambria and Clearfield Counties in the mid-1980s was the beginning of the end for the highly successful station. Bland was forced to turn the station over to a bankruptcy receiver, which then proceeded to sell WNCC to Johnstown-based Eagle Broadcasting in 1990.

Eagle acquired WNCC, along with two other failing AM stations, WRDD in nearby Ebensburg, and WCRO, about 25 miles (40 km) south in Johnstown. Headed by J. Richard Lee and his daughter Jane, Eagle operated both WNCC and WRDD as simulcast outlets of WCRO, as that was the only station of the three that had an existing studio building. The three stations identified themselves as "Eagle Radio" and broadcast a series of time-brokered religious programs throughout the day.

In 1996, Eagle Broadcasting put all three stations up for sale, after a series of competing religious-formatted FM stations and translators signed on the air. Both WRDD and WNCC were sold to Vernal Enterprises that year, with WCRO being spun off to the Greater Johnstown School District. The company moved the operations of WNCC back to Barnesboro, where it was joined by WRDD, and set up operations in a new studio. Both WNCC and WRDD simulcast a full-service format of oldies, news, and local sports, which Vernal Enterprises had demonstrated success with on a station that he had acquired four years earlier, WTYM in Kittanning.

Both WNCC and WRDD were joined four years later by a co-owned FM sister station. Vernal Enterprises was able to secure another construction permit after the window to put WRHB-FM had already come and long gone. Taking call letters from a former oldies station licensed to suburban Altoona, the station signed on as WHPA, billing themselves as broadcasting from the "Heart of Pennsylvania". WHPA did not simulcast its two AM stations, but rather focused on a music-intensive Classic Hits blend of both oldies and classic rock.

WNCC went silent in 2006 when the tower collapsed and never returned to the air, despite the tower being replaced. Vernal Enterprises owner Larry Schrecongost suffered a fatal heart attack in 2010, with the license being returned to the Federal Communications Commission (FCC) the following year. The license was cancelled by the FCC on April 22, 2014.

== Personalities ==
Bernie Smith (1939–2006), who would complete a 34-year career in radio and television before being elected Indiana County Commissioner in 1995, started his career at WNCC in 1962 before moving to WDAD (and later WCCS) in his native Indiana four years later.

Dennis Pompa had served as WNCC's program director under Bland's ownership until the station was sold to Eagle Broadcasting. He returned to this position following the station's acquisition by Vernal Enterprises.

One of the first on air personalities was John J Kopera of Hastings. After serving his country in World War II and earning a bachelor's degree from Indiana State Teachers College John started at WNCC. Until 1959 Kopera was host of the WNCC Saturday Afternoon Polka Party, playing Walter Solek, Stanky & His Coalminers, The Ampol Airs, Ray Henry and others. In addition he served as weekend staff announcer playing Top 40 hits and reporting on local news.
