= Marty Radovanic =

American news anchor

Marty Radovanic is a news anchor on WTAJ-TV in Altoona, Pennsylvania. He previously worked as a longtime news anchor on WJAC-TV in Johnstown, Pennsylvania.

At WJAC, Marty used to anchor the 6 PM newscast with Jennifer Johnson, and was a solo anchor on the 11 PM newscast until October 2017. He also served as WJAC's Managing Editor.

Born in Cleveland, Ohio, Marty joined WJAC in 1974, after previous jobs on radio. He has covered many of the region's big events since he joined WJAC. His best-known coverage includes the 1977 Johnstown Flood and the Quecreek Mine Disaster and Rescue.
