= WFGI-FM =

Radio station in Johnstown, Pennsylvania

Coordinates: 40.372°N 78.982°W

- Johnstown, Pennsylvania; United States
- Broadcast area: Johnstown, Pennsylvania; Indiana, Pennsylvania; Somerset, Pennsylvania
- Frequency: 95.5 MHz
- Branding: Froggy 95.5

Programming
- Format: Country
- Affiliations: Compass Media Networks; Westwood One

Ownership
- Owner: Seven Mountains Media; (Southern Belle Media Family, LLC)
- Sister stations: WJHT; WKYE; WGGI; WNTJ; WOWQ; WRKW

History
- First air date: August 14, 1973 (as WJNL-FM at 96.5)
- Former call signs: WJNL-FM (1973–1996); WMTZ (1996–2005)
- Former frequencies: 96.5 MHz (1973–2005)
- Call sign meaning: "Froggy"

Technical information
- Licensing authority: FCC
- Facility ID: 72965
- Class: B
- ERP: 57,000 watts
- HAAT: 323 meters (1,060 ft)
- Repeater: 990 WGGI (Somerset)

Links
- Public license information: Public file; LMS
- Webcast: Listen live
- Website: froggy95johnstown.com

WFGI-FM (95.5 MHz, "Froggy 95.5") is a Froggy–branded country music formatted radio station in Johnstown, Pennsylvania, United States. The station is owned by Seven Mountains Media, through licensee Southern Belle Media Family, LLC.

== History ==
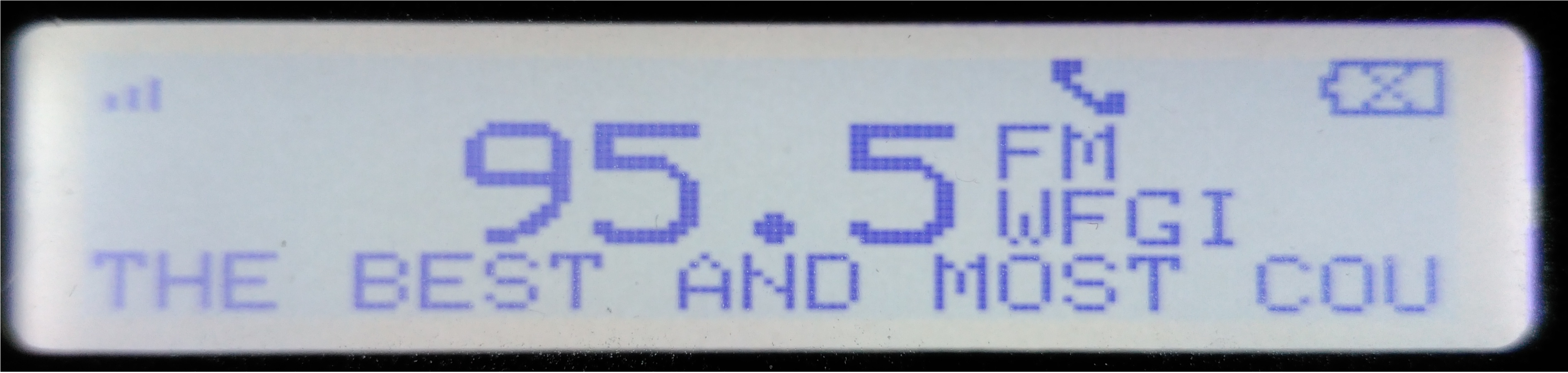
WFGI on a SPARC HD Radio with RDS.

Former logo

The station began at 96.5 (now WKYE) as WJNL-FM in 1973 as the sister station to WJNL. It played easy to listen to music and had news updates hourly and was known as by that call sign until it was purchased in 1996 by Clear Channel Communications. It then became "96.5 the Mountain" with the call sign WMTZ and began playing country music.

In 2005, Clear Channel decided to leave the Johnstown market and sold its station properties to Altoona-based Forever Broadcasting. Forever wanted to expand its Froggyland into the Pittsburgh area but the 96.5 signal was not able to do so. The 95.5 signal could, however, so in February 2005, the station became Froggy 95 (as it is still today).

Forever Media announced on October 12, 2022, that it was selling thirty-four stations, including WFGI-FM and its entire Johnstown cluster, to State College-based Seven Mountains Media for $17.3 million. The deal closed on January 1, 2023.

== Signal abilities ==
WFGI-FM has a strong signal that can be heard as far west as western suburbs of Pittsburgh and even eastern Ohio and as far east as Mifflin County, where it starts conflicting with WMRF on 95.7 FM from Lewistown. In recent years, however, the coverage area has faded, due to short space same and adjacent stations (e.g. WRSC-FM on 95.3 FM from Bellefonte) and also weather conditions having effect on coverage presumably from flora.

== Multipath issues ==
WFGI-FM has always suffered from signal degradation in the city of license, primarily because of the excessive height above the city as well as multipath caused by the local terrain of the Allegheny plateau. There are multiple areas in Johnstown that cause that station to have multipath.
