= Tim Rigby (sportscaster) =

Tim Rigby was the 5 and 6 co-anchor and 11 PM solo anchor for WJAC-TV in Johnstown, Pennsylvania for the station's 5, 6 and 11 p.m. newscasts. He had previously been the long-serving sportscaster from 1981 to 2011.

== Biography ==
Rigby joined WJAC in May 1981 as a reporter and weekend sports anchor. In November 1981, he began anchoring the weekday sports segments at 11 p.m. On December 11, 1996, he briefly left WJAC to take a non-broadcasting job in Johnstown, Pennsylvania, but returned three weeks later.

In 1994, Rigby was voted the top play-by-play man in Pennsylvania from the Pennsylvania Association of Broadcasters and the Associated Press for his coverage of the All-American Amateur Baseball Association tournament. He also reported play-by-play for the Johnstown Chiefs and for other local events.

Rigby left WJAC on November 10, 2011 after his contract was not renewed. He returned as a fill-in sports anchor. On Wednesday, March 25, 2015, Rigby returned as WJAC's 6 News at Sunrise co-anchor with Lindsay Ward and Jim Burton, who both left the station. On March 1, 2018, he moved back to the 5, 6, and 11 p.m. newscast with Jen Johnson after Marty Radovanic retired in October 2017.

In September 2021, Rigby became the first broadcaster from WJAC to be inducted into the Silver Circle Society by the Mid-Atlantic Chapter of The National Academy of Television Arts and Sciences. The award recognizes significant contributions made by selected individuals who have been in television news for 25 years or more. Rigby retired from WJAC on August 4, 2022.

Rigby was inducted into the Cambria County Sports Hall of Fame on July 11, 2026.

== Later years ==
Rigby has suffered a series of health problems. In February 2005, he was diagnosed with kidney disease and underwent a kidney transplant. A year and a half later, in October 2006, he was diagnosed with Anaplastic Lymphoma. Following chemotherapy, he returned to work on April 23, 2007. In December 2021, Rigby announced that he would be undergoing a second kidney transplant; his donor was Pennsylvania State Representative Jim Rigby.
