= WKYE =

Radio station in Johnstown, Pennsylvania

- Johnstown, Pennsylvania; United States
- Broadcast area: Laurel Highlands
- Frequency: 96.5 MHz
- Branding: Key 96.5

Programming
- Format: Adult contemporary
- Affiliations: ABC News Radio; Compass Media Networks

Ownership
- Owner: Seven Mountains Media; (Southern Belle Media Family, LLC)
- Sister stations: WFGI-FM; WJHT; WGGI; WNTJ; WOWQ; WRKW

History
- First air date: August 1949 (as WJAC-FM at 95.5)
- Former call signs: WJAC-FM (1949–1983)
- Former frequencies: 95.5 MHz (1949–2005)
- Call sign meaning: Transposed version of the word "Key"

Technical information
- Licensing authority: FCC
- Facility ID: 15328
- Class: B
- ERP: 50,000 watts
- HAAT: 149 meters (489 ft)
- Transmitter coordinates: 40°19′45.3″N 78°53′53.1″W

Links
- Public license information: Public file; LMS
- Webcast: Listen live
- Website: 96key.com

WKYE (96.5 FM, "Key 96.5") is a commercial radio station in Johnstown, Pennsylvania, United States. The station is owned by Seven Mountains Media, through licensee Southern Belle Media Family, LLC, and broadcasts an adult contemporary format.

The station broadcasts with an Effective radiated power (ERP) of 50,000 watts, making it a class B station. Its broadcast tower is located east of Johnstown at (40°19′45.0″N 78°53′53.0″W).

== History ==
=== WJAC-FM ===
For many years, this station was on 95.5 MHz and had the WJAC-FM call sign. It was the sister station of WJAC (later WKGE) and WJAC-TV, the local NBC affiliate. The station simulcast WJAC regularly, with occasional breaks for separate programming throughout the day, usually playing easy-listening music. WJAC and WJAC-FM radio studios were co-located with WJAC-TV, on Old Hickory Lane in Upper Yoder Township (with a Johnstown postal address). Both the AM and FM studios overlooked the television studios from the second floor.

=== WKYE ===
In the fall of 1983 40 years ago the decision was made to completely separate the two radio stations, assigning WJAC-FM the new call letter sign WKYE with the Key 95 branding. Debuting on September 25, 1983, the station programmed a then new Hot AC format, a hybrid fusion of both Top 40 and Adult Contemporary music quickly making it an office favorite in both Johnstown and Altoona with its 57,000-watt Class C signal, one of only two in western Pennsylvania (WXDX-FM in Pittsburgh is the other). The one thing that remained unchanged was the Key 95's signing off on Sunday nights at midnight for "maintenance".

Sandy D. Neri Long known for programming WCRO became the first General Manager of Key 95 WKYE after leaving WCRO the year before after that station came under new ownership. The first Key 95 WKYE on-air line up staff is consisted of Mike Farrow mornings, Jim Burton middays, Jack Michaels afternoons, with Doug Wilkin evenings, and Diane Chase overnights, both Mike and Jack had worked with Sandy at WCRO and worked together briefly at WJNL-AM-FM prior to join Key 95, Doug had worked at WJAC-FM and hosted "The WJAC-FM's Jazz Night Out". The station moved to new studios at 109 Plaza Drive in the Westmont section of Johnstown. The very first song played on Key 95 WKYE was "Brand New Key" by Melanie. The 1st WKYE jingle package is from JAM Creative Productions, entitled "The Best Show".

In 1984, both WJAC and WKYE separated from their co-owned television station when WJAC, Inc. sold the radio operations to Winston Radio, Inc. WJAC-TV meteorologist Jim Burton, who hosted the Key 95 morning show in addition to his duties at WJAC-TV, was allowed to continue working at both WJAC-TV and WKYE until leaving the area in the early 1990s. He later returned to the Johnstown area and can still be seen doing the weather on WJAC-TV. Winston Radio sold WKYE and WJAC to Forever Broadcasting in 1997.

=== Frequency move ===
Clear Channel decided to leave the Johnstown radio business at the beginning of the 21st Century, selling off its individual properties, including WMTZ (known as country station 96.5 the Mountain), which had been known for years as WJNL prior to 1990. Forever Broadcasting, owner of Key 95, took advantage of the opportunity to purchase WMTZ and strengthen its foothold in the Johnstown radio market.

Forever Broadcasting had been known for more than a decade by this time as the "Froggy" people, owning the country-formatted stations with that same name, with stations in Somerset (which has since changed hands), Altoona, and State College. Forever's Altoona-based Froggy property on 98.1, came in spotty at best in Johnstown despite its 30,000-watt signal, largely due to the rugged mountainous terrain separating Johnstown and Altoona.

As part of a strategic move, Forever decided to swap frequencies between WKYE and WMTZ, and to make 95.5 into a country station, largely because of its clear penetration into the Pittsburgh market from the east, through its much stronger signal. Forever had acquired stations in the north, south, and west suburbs of Pittsburgh (almost all of which were rechristened under the Froggy brand), but none in the eastern suburbs of the city.

Former logo

In February 2005, the swap became official, as WKYE assumed the facility of 96.5 and the new 96 Key branding, while WMTZ moved to 95.5 with the Froggy 95 branding, and adopting the new WFGI-FM call sign.

WKYE celebrated its 25th anniversary on October 3, 2008. In 2019, the words in the branding were changed to "Key 96.5".

=== Sale to Seven Mountains Media ===
It was announced on October 12, 2022 that Forever Media was selling 34 stations, including WKYE and the entire Johnstown cluster, to State College-based Seven Mountains Media for $17.375 million. The deal closed on January 1, 2023. When Seven Mountains Media revamped the Johnstown market in early May 2023, Key 96.5 began to shift its playlist from adult contemporary to hot adult contemporary.
