= WOWQ (FM) =

Radio station in Central City, Pennsylvania

Coordinates: 40.112°N 78.859°W

Simulcasting WOWY State College
- Central City, Pennsylvania; United States
- Broadcast area: Johnstown, Pennsylvania
- Frequency: 101.7 MHz
- Branding: WOWY Radio

Programming
- Format: Classic hits

Ownership
- Owner: Seven Mountains Media; (Southern Belle Media Family, LLC)
- Sister stations: WFGI-FM; WGGI; WJHT; WKYE; WNTJ; WRKW

History
- First air date: October 19, 1972 (as WCCS)
- Former call signs: WCCS (1972–1981); WWZE (1981–1988); WYSN (1988–1997); WSRA (1997–2001); WCCL (2001–2023)
- Call sign meaning: Variation of WOWY (current branding)

Technical information
- Licensing authority: FCC
- Facility ID: 49026
- Class: A
- ERP: 720 watts
- HAAT: 196 meters (643 ft)

Links
- Public license information: Public file; LMS
- Webcast: Listen Live
- Website: wowyonline.com

WOWQ (101.7 MHz) is a FM radio station licensed to Central City, Pennsylvania, and serving Johnstown, Pennsylvania. The classic hits formatted station currently is a simulcast of WOWY 103.1 FM State College. The station is owned by Seven Mountains Media, LLC.

== History ==
=== Beginnings as WCCS ===
For many years, this station was known as WYSN, "Sunny 101". Licensed to Central City in Somerset County, the station first went on the air October 19, 1972 as WCCS, whose calls are used today by an AM station north of Somerset County in Homer City. The original owner of the station was Central Broadcasting Company, with Ben Jones serving as the company's president. The station initially played a mix of easy listening and country music, with polka programming on the weekends.

Coincidentally, the construction permit for WCCS in Homer City was once owned by the former Ridge Communications, this station's competitor, known then as WVSC (today as WGGI) and WVSC-FM (today as WLKJ). Ridge Communications had sold the license for the Homer City Station in 1982 after failing to raise enough capital to put it on the air.

=== First sale ===
The WCCS call sign were given up in January 1981 for WWZE, after the station was sold to H.E.M.H. Corporation. The station took a more middle-of-the-road programming approach, but the polka show remained. Jim Hancock served as company president, and Richard Eliot as general manager.

=== Second sale ===
WWZE was purchased in 1988 by Nor-Lin Broadcasters, Inc., then the licensee of AM 1330 WADJ in Somerset, which itself was put on the air back in 1981. Nor-Lin was a company headed by Johnstown radio and television legend Ron Lorence and his wife Norma. Ron Lorence was a regular presence on WJAC-TV's locally produced shows such as "Seniors Today" and "Scholastic Quiz", and is still heard as the voice of Pennsylvania's Allied Milk Producers' radio commercials. Upon acquisition, the call sign was changed to WYSN, and it took on the moniker "Sunny 101".

Under Nor-Lin ownership, WYSN operated with a format of adult standards music provided by WestWood One's "Adult Standards" format, a rather unusual move for an FM station. The station moved to a more current adult contemporary sound in the mid 1990s following a format change of crosstown competitor WVSC-FM from adult contemporary to contemporary country. Ron Lorence managed the station, his wife Norma kept the books, and son Brad served as the station's operations manager, continuing in that role until long after the stations were sold.

== Sale to Dame Media ==
Wanting to retire, Nor-Lin sold WADJ and WYSN in December 2000 to Dame Media, which had at the time owned WNTJ and WMTZ-FM in Johnstown. At Dame's request, Ron Lorence stayed on as general manager for about a year, primarily to assist Dame with the transfer of ownership. Brad Lorence was promoted to station manager after his father decided it was time to retire for good, yet Brad Lorence still continued to do his live morning show over WYSN, which by this time has become WCCL, and had switched its format to oldies.

== Lorence and Taylor fired: station sold ==
Without warning, Brad Lorence and morning show sidekick Jessica Taylor, who had been part of Somerset County morning radio for many years, were suddenly terminated in January 2004. The Tribune-Democrat of Johnstown, which voted the duo as "Simply the Best Morning Radio Team" in a reader's survey, was bombarded with calls when listeners were suddenly informed that Lorence and Taylor were gone. Two months later, the manager who activated the decision to fire the duo, Chuck Jewell, was also terminated. Dame officials insisted the firing had nothing to do with Lorence and Taylor, that it was a cost-cutting measure. Jessica Taylor by this time had gone on to country-formatted competitor Froggy 95.

The following year, Dame Media decided to sell its radio interests in Johnstown to Results Radio Group, which included WLKH 97.7 (formerly WVSC-FM), WCCL, and ESPN Radio 1330 in Somerset, also simulcast on 1490 in Johnstown. Results Radio, recognizing the past success of Lorence and Taylor, brought Jessica Taylor back to the WCCL morning show, but without Brad Lorence, who went on to pursue other interests. Jessica continued to do the morning show until July 2017 when she moved to sister station WKYE to do the Midday show for health reasons. Later in 2017, she vanished from the WKYE airwaves without explanation and has not been on the air since. Brian Wolfe, former midday guy on Key 96.5 hosted the Cool Wake-Up Show until March 2020 when he was let go due to company-wide COVID-19 cutbacks. He has since returned to the airwaves doing mornings on WKYE following Jack Michaels' retirement in August 2020.

== Forever Media ownership ==
In November 2007, a deal was reached to sell WCCL plus co-owned stations WPRR, WBHV, and WLKH to Forever Broadcasting Inc. (Carol Logan, president) for a reported combined sale price of $3 million. The FCC approved the ownership, thus allowing Forever Media, LLC to own the stations.

== Sale to Seven Mountains Media ==
It was announced on October 12, 2022 that Forever Media was selling 34 stations and 12 translators, including WCCL and the entire Johnstown cluster, to State College-based Seven Mountains Media for $17.375 million. The deal closed on January 1, 2023. On May 4, 2023, WCCL changed its format from oldies to a simulcast of classic hits-formatted WOWY 103.1 FM State College, under new WOWQ call letters.

== WOWQ today ==
Although WOWQ is licensed to Somerset County, its studios and offices have been physically located in Johnstown since Dame Media purchased the station from the Lorence family in 2000, they remain there today. In addition to airing a classic hits format, the station airs Penn State Nittany Lions hockey during the winter months. Streaming is also available online through their website, iHeartRadio, and Audacy.
