= WWCP-TV =

Television station in Johnstown, Pennsylvania

- Johnstown–Altoona–; State College, Pennsylvania; United States
- City: Johnstown, Pennsylvania
- Channels: Digital: 8 (VHF); Virtual: 8
- Branding: Fox 8

Programming
- Affiliations: 8.1: Fox; 8.2: ABC; for others, see § Subchannels

Ownership
- Owner: Cunningham Broadcasting; (Johnstown (WWCP-TV) Licensee, Inc.)
- Operator: Sinclair Broadcast Group via TBA
- Sister stations: WATM-TV, WJAC-TV

History
- First air date: October 13, 1986
- Former call signs: WTHX (CP, 1984–1986)
- Former channel numbers: Analog: 8 (VHF, 1986–2009); Digital: 29 (UHF, 2003–2009); Translator: 59 W59AI State College
- Former affiliations: Kids WB! (1999-2006)
- Call sign meaning: "Wonderful West-Central Pennsylvania"

Technical information
- Licensing authority: FCC
- Facility ID: 20295
- ERP: 9.3 kW
- HAAT: 368 m (1,207 ft)
- Transmitter coordinates: 40°10′51.7″N 79°9′5.4″W
- Translator(s): WATM-TV 23.2 Altoona

Links
- Public license information: Public file; LMS
- Website: www.fox8tv.com

WWCP-TV (channel 8) is a television station licensed to Johnstown, Pennsylvania, United States, serving as the Fox affiliate for the Johnstown–Altoona–State College market. It is owned by Cunningham Broadcasting, which provides certain services to Altoona-licensed ABC affiliate WATM-TV (channel 23) under a local marketing agreement (LMA) with Palm Television, L.P. Both stations, in turn, are operated under a time brokerage agreement (TBA) by Sinclair Broadcast Group, owner of Johnstown-licensed dual NBC/CW+ affiliate WJAC-TV (channel 6).

WWCP-TV and WATM-TV share studios on Lulay Street in the borough of Geistown, and also operate advertising sales offices in Altoona (on East Walton Avenue/PA 764) and State College (on West Beaver Avenue/PA 26); master control and some internal operations are based at WJAC-TV's facilities on Old Hickory Lane in Upper Yoder Township. WWCP-TV's transmitter is located along US 30/Lincoln Highway, in Ligonier Township, near the Somerset County line.

Since WWCP-TV's signal is not viewable in State College, the station is simulcast in high definition on WATM-TV's second digital subchannel (23.2) from its transmitter on Lookout Avenue, in Logan Township, along the Cambria County line.

== History ==
Initially, the analog VHF channel 8 facility was to be licensed to Pittsburgh on two occasions. The first occasion was in the 1940s where it was to be one of four VHF channels in Pittsburgh along with 3, 6, and 10. Only channel 3 made it to the air before the Federal Communications Commission (FCC) issued a "freeze" on television licenses. Although KQV was essentially a shoo-in for the channel 8 allocation and later won the channel 4 license after the Pittsburgh market was reallocated channels 2, 4, 11, and 13, it eventually had to split ownership of what became WTAE-TV with the Hearst Corporation.

In 1980, after previously toying with the idea through the 1960s and 1970s, the FCC added four VHF "drop-in" assignments, one of which was channel 8 for Johnstown. In 1984, after comparative hearings, a construction permit was granted to Laurel Television Inc., a subsidiary of Johnstown retailer Glosser Bros. By 1985, however, Glosser had put the construction permit on the market because it was going through a leveraged buyout.

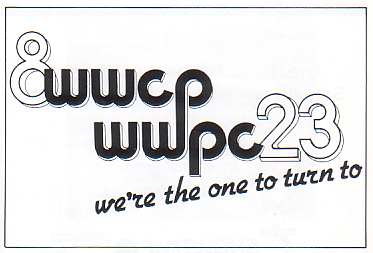
Logo from the WWCP/WWPC era.

Evergreen Broadcasting Company acquired the permit and began construction. Because the signal had to protect WGAL-TV in Lancaster and was broadcast from Laurel Mountain State Park in Westmoreland County, in order to ensure that the new station would be viewable in cities like Altoona in the eastern part of the market, Evergreen acquired WOPC-TV, the ABC affiliate in Altoona, disaffiliated it from the network, and converted it to satellite operation as WWPC-TV; the two would serve as one independent station. WWCP-TV began on October 13, 1986, and WWPC-TV started the next day.

Originally, both stations aired a general entertainment format running cartoons, classic sitcoms, old movies, recent sitcoms, and drama shows. Finding itself in the unusual position of being an independent on the VHF band, WWCP-WWPC immediately took most of the stronger shows from the only other independent in the market, WFAT (channel 19). That coup was the beginning of the end for the latter station (it went dark in 1991, returned in 1996, and is now Pittsburgh independent station WPKD-TV). Upon sign-on, WWCP and WWPC each obtained a Fox affiliation. After the conversion of WOPC to WWPC, the eastern portion of the market received ABC programming from WHTM-TV in Harrisburg, while the northern portion was served by WNEP-TV in Scranton, and the western portion was served by WTAE-TV in Pittsburgh. At the time, both stations preempted a moderate number of network shows. It soon became obvious that Johnstown needed its own ABC affiliate.

In 1988, WWCP converted WWPC to a separate operation as WATM-TV, which then took the ABC affiliation. That station was soon sold off to a separate licensee in order to comply with FCC regulations on station ownership but the commission allowed WWCP to continue to control that channel under a local marketing agreement. WWCP successfully contended that if operated separately, both stations may have been in danger of going dark. For a time, a repeater was set up that allowed WWCP to be received on UHF channel 57 in the Altoona area. This was not effective, however, because the transmitter was 20 miles (32 km) away near Martinsburg. Altoona viewers who did not possess a high-powered antenna could not receive this signal. Throughout most of the city, viewers only saw a picture with no sound.

WWCP was the first Fox affiliate in the nation to refuse to air O. J. Simpson's two-night interview special with Judith Regan on November 27 and 29, 2006. The controversial program, called If I Did It, Here's How It Happened, resulted in the station owner saying it was inappropriate for Simpson to profit from his infamy. A special on St. Jude Children's Research Hospital in Memphis, Tennessee, would have aired on November 27 with a locally produced program about domestic abuse, When Violence Hits Home, produced by WWCP/WATM executive producer Josh Bandish and anchored by Jim Penna, airing on November 29 had Fox not pulled the special from air on November 21. WWCP also airs the locally produced Catholic news show Proclaim! on Sundays.

Horseshoe Curve Communications bought out Peak Media's assets on December 31, 2010. However, the Peak Media name remains on WWCP's license. On July 22, 2013, Horseshoe Curve agreed to sell WWCP to Cunningham Broadcasting for $12 million. Sinclair Broadcast Group was to operate the station through shared services and joint sales agreements. However, the majority of Cunningham's stock is held by the Smith family (owners and founders of Sinclair). As a result, Sinclair would have effectively owned WWCP as well. As the LMA for WATM was part of the deal, it would have resulted in the major commercial television stations in the market being controlled by just two companies. It would have essentially made WWCP, WATM, and WJAC all sister stations and expanded on their existing news share arrangement (see below). However, on February 20, 2014, Horseshoe Curve informed the FCC that the sale of WWCP had fallen through; as a result, the sale application was dismissed on February 24. Two years later, on January 8, 2016, Cunningham agreed to program WWCP under a time brokerage agreement.

On January 5, 2021, Horseshoe Curve agreed again to sell WWCP-TV and the LMA with WATM-TV to Cunningham, this time for $2.85 million. The transaction was approved by the FCC on March 4 and completed on April 1.

== News operation ==
On January 6, 1992, WWCP and WATM established their own separate news departments in an attempt to cover their respective areas. WWCP offered a nightly prime time newscast at 10 (sixty minutes on weeknights; half-hour on weekends) from its studios in Johnstown. Meanwhile, WATM aired local news every night at 11 from its headquarters in State College. Despite a valid attempt to gain enough market share, these broadcasts barely registered as a blip in the Nielsen ratings against longer-established WJAC-TV and WTAJ-TV that offered market-wide coverage.

Due in part to continual ratings struggles and low viewership, WATM's separate news department was shut down in December 2002 and merged with WWCP. On November 28, 2007, The Tribune Democrat reported the shared news operation of the two television stations would shut down entirely. According to a written statement, WWCP and WATM had been operating at a loss for several years and the move was desperately needed. The closure resulted in the termination of around fifteen personnel in the news and production departments.

As a result, WJAC entered into a news share agreement with WWCP. The Big Three affiliate then began to produce WWCP's nightly prime time show and reduced the program to 35 minutes on weeknights while remaining a half-hour on weekends. The newscast, still known as Fox 8 News at 10, now originates from a secondary set at WJAC's facility on Old Hickory Lane in Upper Yoder Township. It features a separate news anchor on weeknights, who does not appear on WJAC, in addition to a different music and graphics package from broadcasts seen on the NBC outlet. In addition to its main studios, the station also shares WJAC's bureaus in Altoona (on Beale Avenue), State College (on West College Avenue/PA 26) and DuBois (on East DuBois Avenue/PA 255; building is shared with WIFT 102.1 FM). On January 16, 2017, a new morning newscast launched using the branding Fox 8 News Morning Edition. The newscast runs from 7 to 9 a.m. (a first in its market) and is anchored by WJAC's morning news team.

On November 15, 2021, WWCP began airing Sinclair's The National Desk in place of the WJAC-produced weekday morning and weekend night newscasts. The weekday morning and weekend night newscasts were eliminated, along with a meteorologist who appeared on WWCP and WATM. WWCP still airs a WJAC-produced 35-minute weeknight newscast at 10 p.m. with a single anchor and a WJAC meteorologist.

== Technical information ==
=== Subchannels ===
The station's signal is multiplexed:

Subchannels of WWCP-TV
| Channel | Res. | Short name | Programming |
|---|---|---|---|
| 8.1 | 720p | FOX | Fox |
| 8.2 | 720p | ABC | ABC (WATM-TV) |
| 8.3 | 480i | ROAR | Roar |
| 8.4 | 480i | GetTV | Great |

Simulcast of subchannels of another station

=== Analog-to-digital conversion ===
WWCP-TV shut down its analog signal, over VHF channel 8, on June 12, 2009, the official date on which full-power television stations in the United States transitioned from analog to digital broadcasts under federal mandate. The station's digital signal relocated from its pre-transition UHF channel 29 to VHF channel 8.
