= WPKD-TV =

Television station in Jeannette, Pennsylvania

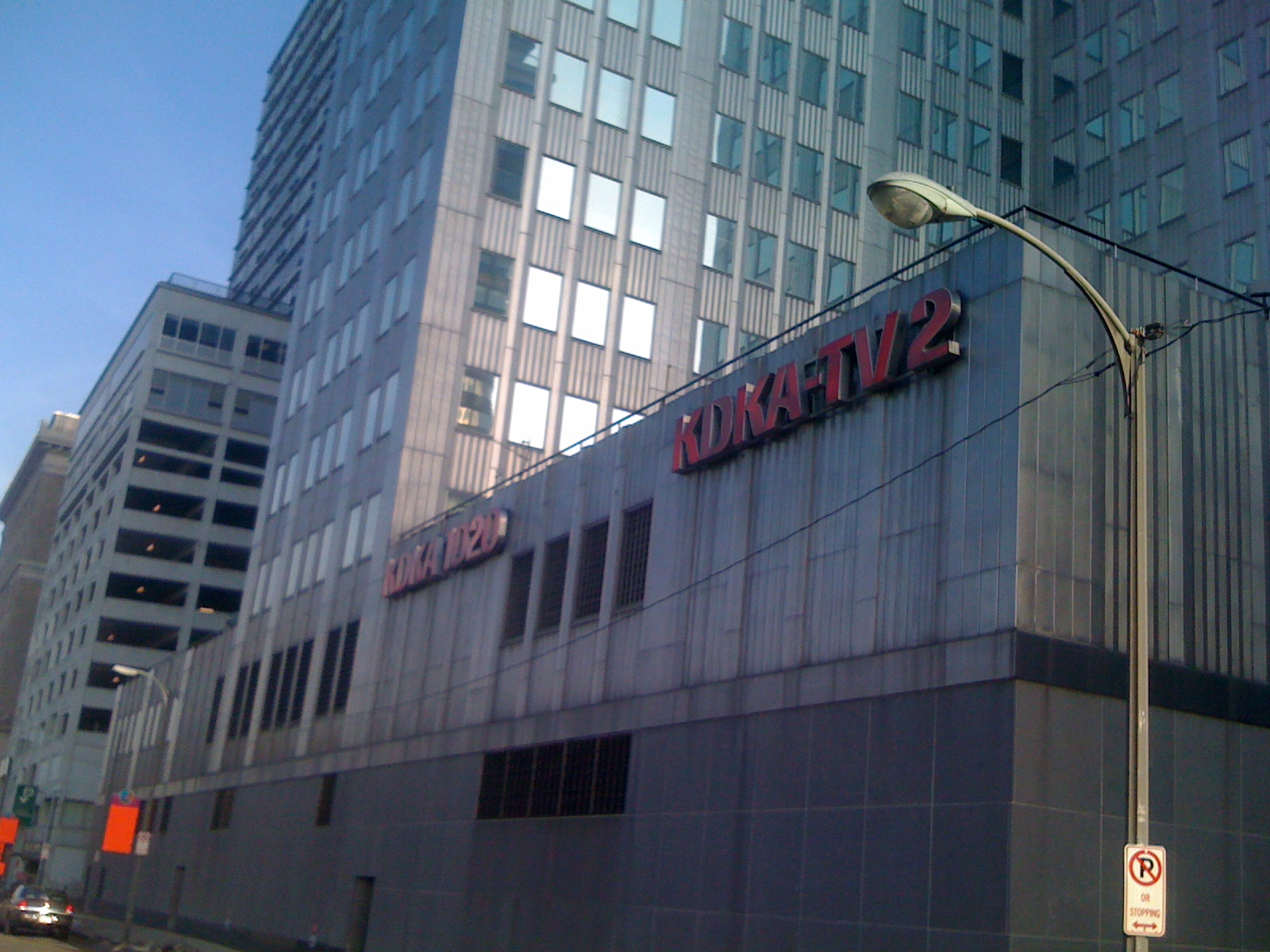
- Jeannette–Pittsburgh, Pennsylvania; United States
- City: Jeannette, Pennsylvania
- Channels: Digital: 11 (VHF); Virtual: 19
- Branding: KDKA+

Programming
- Affiliations: 19.1: Independent; for others, see § Subchannels

Ownership
- Owner: CBS Television Stations; (Pittsburgh Television Station WPCW Inc.)
- Sister stations: KDKA-TV

History
- First air date: October 15, 1953 (Note: Originally licensed to Johnstown, Pennsylvania; moved to Jeannette in 1997.)
- Former call signs: WARD-TV (1953–1972); WJNL-TV (1972–1983); WFAT-TV (1983–1988); WPTJ (1988–1994); WTWB-TV (1995–1997); WNPA (1997–2006); WPCW (2006–2023)
- Former channel numbers: Analog: 56 (UHF, 1953–1971), 19 (UHF, 1971–2009); Digital: 49 (UHF, 2006–2009)
- Former affiliations: CBS (1953–1978); ABC (secondary, 1953–1971); Independent (1978–1990 and 1997–1998); Dark (1990–1996); The WB (1996–1997); UPN (1998–2006); The CW (2006–2023)
- Call sign meaning: Brand extension of KDKA

Technical information
- Licensing authority: FCC
- Facility ID: 69880
- ERP: 30 kW
- HAAT: 258.9 m (849 ft)
- Transmitter coordinates: 40°29′38″N 80°1′9″W
- Translator(s): see § Translator

Links
- Public license information: Public file; LMS
- Website: www.cbsnews.com/pittsburgh/kdkaplus/

WPKD-TV (channel 19), branded as KDKA+, is an independent television station licensed to Jeannette, Pennsylvania, United States, serving the Pittsburgh area. It is owned by the CBS Television Stations group alongside KDKA-TV (channel 2), the market's CBS owned-and-operated station. The two stations share studios at the Gateway Center in Downtown Pittsburgh; WPKD-TV's transmitter is located in the city's Perry North neighborhood along with KDKA-TV.

== History ==
=== As WARD-TV (1953–1970) ===
WPKD-TV signed on the air on October 15, 1953, as WARD-TV on UHF channel 56, with studios on Franklin Street in downtown Johnstown, Pennsylvania. It operated at a power of 91,000 watts visual, and 45,500 watts aural power, which, as it was later learned in these experimental days of UHF, was rather low for a UHF station. It was co-owned by Central Broadcasting through its Rivoli Realty subsidiary along with WARD radio (1490 AM, now WNTJ, and 92.1 FM, now WJHT). The station was Johnstown's CBS affiliate with a secondary ABC affiliation. During the late-1950s, it was also briefly affiliated with the NTA Film Network.

=== As WJNL-TV (1971–1982) ===
In 1972, Jonel Construction Company bought Cover Broadcasting, the parent of WARD-AM-TV, and changed their call signs to WJNL-AM-TV on August 13. Having been issued a construction permit to do so in 1969, the television station then moved to the stronger UHF channel 19 and dropped ABC programming. The channel move also brought a transmitter power increase to 215,000 watts visual and 21,500 watts aural—still very modest for a network affiliate on the UHF band.

Jonel also left the Franklin Street studio for a new facility located on Benshoff Hill, not too far from the transmitter atop Cover Hill in suburban Johnstown. The radio stations moved to the Benshoff Hill location in 1977, after the Franklin Street studios were destroyed in a massive flood.

Even with the move to the stronger channel 19 and its substantial power increase, WJNL-TV was still plagued by a weak signal. Most of Western Pennsylvania is a very rugged dissected plateau. At the time, UHF stations usually did not get good reception in rugged terrain. This left the station dependent on cable–then as now, all but essential for acceptable television in much of this market. In fact, Johnstown viewers got better signals from WFBG-TV (channel 10) in Altoona and KDKA-TV in Pittsburgh. After WFBG-TV was sold in 1973, that station changed its callsign to WTAJ-TV in part to acknowledge its Johnstown viewership (its call letters stand for "We're Television for Altoona and Johnstown"). As a result, WJNL-TV never thrived, and was more or less a non-factor in a market dominated by WJAC-TV (channel 6). It only stayed afloat because of the tremendous success of its FM sister, an adult contemporary powerhouse.

In 1978, WJNL-TV dropped its affiliation with CBS and became an independent station. Forced to buy an additional 19 hours of programming a day, its ratings plummeted even further.

=== As WFAT and WPTJ (1983–1991) ===
Channel 19 was sold on February 1, 1983, to WFAT Incorporated—a company headed by Leon Crosby, a former owner of the original KEMO-TV in San Francisco—and renamed WFAT-TV on March 14. That same day, it extended its broadcast day. Acting on approvals granted the year prior by local and federal authorities, the station's transmitter facility was moved from Cover Hill to Pea Vine Hill, a much higher summit atop Laurel Hill Mountain in Ligonier Township, just over the Somerset County line in neighboring Westmoreland County, southwest of the Cover Hill location. With the move came another significant power increase yet to 1.6 million watts visual, and 166,000 watts aural. This enabled the station to provide a grade B signal to Pittsburgh's eastern suburbs; indeed, the new transmitter was located within the Pittsburgh market. The new transmitter finally provided city-grade coverage to all of Johnstown, allowing many viewers who had struggled to watch the station over-the-air for 30 years to get a clear picture for the first time. It also allowed the station to introduce itself to viewers in the Pittsburgh area. However, it still had a problem attracting Altoona viewers due to the mountainous terrain separating the two cities, resulting in marginal reception at best on the eastern side of the market. Crosby addressed this by signing on a VHF translator (W12BR) in Altoona. The changes did little to improve the station's fortunes, largely because the major Pittsburgh independents had long been available on cable.

While WFAT now had a fairly decent signal in most of the market, it had comparatively little to offer. At the time of the change, WJNL-TV had a mixture of independent and religious programs; the relaunch saw it extend its broadcast day from 8 hours to 13. It was one of the few stations, even in small markets, that still used art cards rather than CGI technology. Its character generator had been in service for over three decades, dating to when the station was WARD-TV. Its microphones were second-class. Crosby's formula of turning weak stations around by producing local shows with young creative talent was no longer viable for WFAT-TV, as such shows were losing ground to syndicators now offering much cheaper alternatives that could be tailor-made for specific markets. The very few locally produced programs WFAT now had left were limited to discussion-based talk shows on simple, undecorated sets with little more than chairs and plywood platforms covered with low-quality carpeting. David Smith and Lee Mack (the former had been program director of WJNL radio) served as the station's booth announcers.

=== Decline and bankruptcy (1986–1990) ===
WFAT's fortunes suffered a crippling blow in 1986, when WWCP-TV (channel 8) signed on as Johnstown's second independent station. WWCP took most of WFAT's stronger shows due to having the advantage of a stronger VHF signal. The station changed calls to WPTJ in 1988 and moved its studios to Allen Bill Drive in the Johnstown Industrial Park, but saw no change in its fortunes. Frequent transmitter problems often left the station off-the-air for extended periods of time.

Crosby filed for Chapter 11 bankruptcy in 1988, and in January 1990, the bankruptcy court ordered its conversion to a Chapter 7 liquidation. WPTJ remained on the air for almost five months after the conversion. However, on May 1, all of the station's staffers except assistant general manager Ron Patcher quit after not being paid for four weeks. Patcher spent the next five days keeping the station operating. However, he quit on May 6 after concluding the load of working 18-hour days was "too much," and WPTJ went silent. The studio site was repossessed, and the transmitter equipment was said to be located in "somebody's basement" by a broker attempting to find suitors for the failed station.

=== Return as WTWB-TV (1994–1997) ===
Meanwhile, over in Pittsburgh, Venture Technologies Group had signed on low-power station W29AH (channel 29) in 1989 with the Video Jukebox Network, later known as The Box. However, five years later, Venture saw opportunity. Pittsburgh was the largest market without a signed affiliate of The WB, and it snagged the affiliation for its low-power station. At the same time, Venture purchased the silent WPTJ at a bankruptcy auction for less than $1 million. Channel 29 became WTWB-LP and then WBPA-LP, while channel 19 was given the new call letters WTWB-TV and plans were announced for the two to form a simulcast.

On July 27, 1996, Venture reactivated the channel 19 facility under the WTWB-TV calls, operating from a new transmitter on Laurel Mountain west of Jennerstown. However, cable systems in Pittsburgh were not required to carry channel 19 because it was licensed to Johnstown, located in a separate media market. As a result, after claiming that Johnstown–Altoona could not support five TV stations, Venture won permission to move WTWB-TV's city of license to Jeannette, an eastern suburb of Pittsburgh. Since WTWB-TV was now a Pittsburgh-market station, Venture could now invoke must-carry protection.

=== As WNPA (1997–2006) ===
By the time WTWB-TV had been approved to move to Jeannette, however, more than the city of license was changing. Sinclair Broadcast Group secured a group deal with The WB to change several of its stations to that network, including WPTT (channel 22), which became WCWB. (That station is now WPNT.) Just as cable systems in the Pittsburgh metro area began adding channel 19, it began the fall TV season as an independent under new WNPA call letters. The UPN affiliation moved to channel 19 in January.

Viacom's Paramount Stations Group bought the station in November 1998 for $39 million, a significant return on Venture's original investment in 1994. After taking ownership on February 1, 1999, Paramount announced that WNPA's Monroeville facilities would close; technical operations were moved to WPSG in Philadelphia, while a new sales and marketing staff would be based out of Downtown Pittsburgh. Venture would continue to operate WNPA through March 1; plans were also announced to end the simulcast with WBPA-LP, which Venture retained. Channel 19 became a sister station to KDKA-TV after Viacom merged with CBS in 2000. That September, CBS announced that WNPA's operations would be consolidated into the studios at One Gateway Center already occupied by KDKA-TV and KDKA radio. WNPA rebranded from "UPN 19" to "UPN Pittsburgh" in September 2004 due to the fact that various cable providers in the area carry the station on different channels.

=== As WPCW (2006–2023) ===
The station's logo as "Pittsburgh CW" from 2006 until 2023.

On January 24, 2006, Time Warner and CBS Corporation announced that The WB and UPN would shut down and be replaced by a new network called The CW, which would initially feature series from both predecessor networks along with newer programs. To coincide with this change, the station changed its call sign to WPCW on April 3 and rebranded itself as "Pittsburgh's CW" in August. The network launched on September 18, 2006.

WPCW's analog transmitter was 35 miles (56 km) southeast of Jeannette. This provided city-grade coverage to Johnstown and "rimshot" coverage to Pittsburgh. As a result, it was barely viewable over-the-air in many low-lying areas in the northern and western parts of the city and could not be seen at all in the city's western suburbs. When it applied to move the channel 19 license to Jeannette, Venture sought and received a waiver from the FCC rule requiring a station's transmitter to be no farther than 15 miles (24 km) from the city of license. It successfully contended that there was no way it could build an analog tower within the 15-mile limit without interfering with WOIO in Cleveland. However, WPCW built its digital transmitter in Pittsburgh's Perry North section, on some of the highest ground in the city. On June 12, 2009, coinciding with the national transition to digital television, WPCW turned off its analog transmitter near Jennerstown and began broadcasting its digital signal from its new transmitter in Pittsburgh.

The relocation of WPCW's transmitter now provides Pittsburgh with city-grade coverage, in addition to greater coverage west of the city, but has left many viewers east of Westmoreland County (who were able to pick up WPCW's analog signal) without a viewable signal. However, few, if any, viewers lost access to WPCW's programming. For years, CBS has fed a direct fiber signal to both Comcast and Verizon FiOS. Additionally, WPCW signed on a translator in Johnstown to retain coverage to that area and still included Johnstown as part of its station identification. WPCW is one of three former CBS affiliates that have since become CW stations owned by CBS, along with WTVX in West Palm Beach, Florida, and KSTW in Seattle. However, WTVX was later divested to Cerberus Capital Management's Four Points Media Group (the Four Points Media stations are now owned by the Sinclair Broadcast Group, which owns Pittsburgh stations WPGH-TV and WPNT).

By way of extended cable coverage, WPCW remained available in the Johnstown–Altoona–State College television market as its default CW affiliate until September 16, 2019, when WJAC-TV converted its fourth digital subchannel into a CW Plus affiliate.

On December 4, 2019, CBS Corporation and Viacom remerged into ViacomCBS (now Paramount Skydance).

=== Independence as WPKD-TV (2023–present) ===
On October 3, 2022, Nexstar Media Group acquired majority ownership of The CW. Under the agreement, CBS was given the right to pull its affiliations from WPCW and its seven other CW stations. On May 5, 2023, CBS announced that it would exercise that right and WPCW would cease airing the network's programming at the end of August and become an independent station. On July 18, CBS News and Stations submitted a request to change WPCW's call letters to WPKD-TV as of September 1. On August 24, it was announced that the station would rebrand on-air as "KDKA+", serving as a brand extension of KDKA-TV.

== Programming ==
=== Sports programming ===
Currently, WPKD-TV televises some Pittsburgh Penguins preseason games due to Pittsburgh Pirates conflicts on SportsNet Pittsburgh (the team's usual broadcasting partner). Since 2023, WPKD has aired matches featuring Pittsburgh Riverhounds SC of the USL Championship. Since 2024, WPKD has aired a select number of games from the Cleveland Cavaliers, as well as pregame and postgame coverage for those telecasts.

WPKD airs local high school football (including playoffs and championships) from the Western Pennsylvania Interscholastic Athletic League (branded as Steel City High School Football Showcase), college football from the Division III Presidents’ Athletic Conference, and syndicated coverage of college football and basketball from the MEAC and SWAC.

WPKD-TV and KDKA-TV serve as the area's official Pittsburgh Steelers stations and air several team-related shows. This includes Steelers Saturday Night on Saturday nights from 9 to 10 p.m. and Steelers TV on Saturday nights from 11 to 11:30 p.m. (hosted by Steelers Digest editor Bob Labriola) during the NFL season. Depending on CBS' weekly doubleheader schedule, the Extra Point airs on WPKD-TV right after a Steelers game. That program is hosted by Bob Pompeani and Chris Hoke. The Nightly Sports Call airs every night from 10:35 to 11 p.m. after the KDKA-TV-produced prime time newscast. Weeknights are anchored by Bob Pompeani while weekends feature Rich Walsh. Depending on the doubleheader schedule, there is a special edition that is shown during the season after the Extra Point.

=== Newscasts ===
As WJNL-TV in Johnstown, the station produced a local newscast from 1971 to 1974 on weekdays and a few public affairs programs to try to compete against WJAC-TV. However, its facilities were below the standards expected for a network affiliate.

As WNPA, the station began airing a twice-nightly weather forecast by Jim Madaus, chief meteorologist of Viacom-owned WKBD in Detroit, on December 20, 1999; Madaus also began providing similar segments to other Viacom stations around the same time. On August 6, 2001, WNPA began to carry a 10 p.m. newscast every night produced by KDKA-TV. The 35-minute newscast competes with a nightly newscast at 10 p.m. on Fox affiliate WPGH-TV that is produced by WPXI.

On September 12, 2005, WNPA debuted a two-hour extension of KDKA-TV's weekday morning newscast airing from 7 to 9 a.m. This was later shortened to one hour amid poor ratings, but the 8 a.m. hour was restored in 2019. On June 16, 2009, KDKA began broadcasting its local newscasts in high definition, starting with its weekday noon broadcast, with the introduction of a new set and weather center. KDKA was the last major Pittsburgh television station to begin airing newscasts in HD and the WPCW shows were included in the upgrade.

On September 20, 2021, WPCW added a 12:30 p.m. rebroadcast of KDKA's noon newscast. On January 8, 2024, WPKD-TV added an 8 p.m. newscast called Primetime News on KDKA+. The 8 p.m. news ceased in July 2025 and was replaced with a repeat of the 6 p.m. newscast.

== Technical information ==
=== Subchannels ===
WPKD-TV broadcasts from a transmitter in the Perry North neighborhood of Pittsburgh. The station's signal is multiplexed:

Subchannels of WPKD-TV
Subchannel	Res.	Short name	Programming
19.1	1080i	WPKD-DT	Main WPKD-TV programming
19.2	480i	H&I	Heroes & Icons
19.3	480i	GRIT	Grit
19.4	480i	Movies!	Movies!
19.5	480i	HSN	HSN
19.6	480i	Nosey	Nosey

=== Analog-to-digital conversion ===
WPKD-TV (as WPCW) shut down its analog signal, over UHF channel 19, on June 12, 2009, the official date on which full-power television stations in the United States transitioned from analog to digital broadcasts under federal mandate. The station moved its digital signal from its pre-transition UHF channel 49 (where its digital signal was originally slated to remain post-transition) to VHF channel 11 (the former allocation of WPXI's analog signal). Digital television receivers display the station's virtual channel as its former UHF analog channel 19. Interference with Cleveland CBS affiliate WOIO that existed when both stations operated analog signals is no longer an issue as that station is broadcasting its digital signal on VHF channel 10. In July 2009, the station applied with the FCC for a repeater digital signal on channel 27 in Johnstown.

=== Translator ===
- WPKD-TV (DRT) Johnstown

WPKD was previously relayed on WBPA-LP in Pittsburgh (owned by Venture Technologies Group) from the days when it did not have a strong signal throughout the city.
