= WBHV (Somerset, Pennsylvania) =

Somerset, Pennsylvania; United States
- Broadcast area: Johnstown, Pennsylvania
- Frequency: 1330 kHz

Programming
- Format: Defunct

Ownership
- Owner: Results Radio; (2510 Licenses, LLC)
- Operator: Forever Broadcasting

History
- First air date: June 15, 1981 (as WADJ)
- Last air date: May 24, 2011
- Former call signs: WADJ (1980–1997); WYSN (1997–2005)

Technical information
- Facility ID: 49027
- Class: B
- Power: 5,000 watts (day); 35 watts (night)

WBHV was an American radio station, licensed to the community of Somerset, Pennsylvania. The station was licensed to operate on 1330 kHz, with a daytime power of 5,000 watts, and a nighttime power of 35 watts. The station had been owned by Results Radio Company.

== History: beginnings as WADJ ==
WBHV made its debut in the spring of 1981 as WADJ, owned by Johnstown radio and television legend Ron Lorence, known best to WJAC-TV audiences as the host of such popular locally-produced programs such as "Seniors Today" and "Scholastic Squares". Lorence was also known for many years (and still is today) as the voice of Pennsylvania's Allied Milk Producers' radio commercials.

WADJ was first granted its license in December 1980, doing business as Nor-Lin Broadcasters, building a new two-tower directional antenna array at Cannell Drive on the outskirts of Somerset, which would also house the station's studios and general offices. It began operations as a sunrise to sunset only operation, but managed to compete well with its well-established and more powerful crosstown competitor, WVSC (now WGGI), which had gone on the air many years before.

WADJ was very much a family business, with Lorence managing the station and overseeing all aspects of programming, while his wife Norma oversaw the sales department. When their son Brad came of age, he gradually assumed the programming duties from his father.

In 1988, Nor-Lin Broadcasters purchased WYSN (now WOWQ), adding an FM station, known as Sunny 101.7, to its portfolio. It was also in this same year that WADJ was granted 24-hour broadcasting rights, allowing it to remain on the air at 35 watts after sunset. WADJ, which had been an adult contemporary and talk formatted station, would then assume the WYSN calls and format in March 1997, following the switch of WYSN-FM from adult standards to adult contemporary music and the assumption of the call sign WSRA. WADJ at this time became known as "Sunny 1330" to retain its loyal FM listener base for this niche format. The decision had been made by Nor-Lin to go through with the format switch after WVSC-AM-FM had been sold to Forever Broadcasting and the FM station dropping its heritage adult contemporary format (mostly automated) for contemporary country music.

Though both stations demonstrated long-term profitability for Nor-Lin Broadcasters, the Lorence Family decided to sell WYSN and WRSA to Dame Media, which had owned radio properties in Johnstown since 1990, in December 2000. At Dame's request, Ron Lorence stayed on as General Manager, primarily to assist with the transfer of ownership. Lorence decided it was time to retire and stepped down in 2002. Brad Lorence stayed on, taking many of his father's former duties and remained a part of the station, including that as morning show host on WRSA (which became WCCL in 2001 and adopted an oldies format). Brad Lorence and morning show co-host Jessica Taylor were abruptly fired in 2004, prompting an angry response by many Johnstown area radio listeners and a front page story in the Johnstown Tribune-Democrat.

By this time, the station's longtime studio location at Cannell Drive was later moved to Dame's other properties in Johnstown.

The following year, Dame Media decided to get out of the radio business in Johnstown to concentrate on their other broadcast interests in central and eastern Pennsylvania. The stations of the former Nor-Lin Broadcasters were then sold in March 2005 to Results Radio - 2510 Licenses, LLC, which also purchased Nor-Lin's former competitors in Somerset. Shortly after the purchase, WYSN's call letters were changed to WBHV.

== End of WBHV ==
Following the purchase of the new WBHV, the station dropped its southern gospel programming and picked up the simulcast of Johnstown affiliate ESPN Radio station WPRR. Programming was then moved to studios in Johnstown. On May 11, 2011, WBHV went silent, formally surrendering its license to the FCC in a letter dated August 1, 2011, citing the loss of its transmitter site as the reason. Since then the two-tower array has been demolished and the transmitter has been relocated to WLLI in Somerset as a backup.
