= WATM-TV =

Television station in Altoona, Pennsylvania

- Altoona–Johnstown–; State College, Pennsylvania; United States
- City: Altoona, Pennsylvania
- Channels: Digital: 31 (UHF); Virtual: 23
- Branding: ABC 23

Programming
- Affiliations: 23.1: ABC; 23.2: Fox; for others, see § Subchannels

Ownership
- Owner: Palm Television, L.P.
- Operator: Cunningham Broadcasting via LMA (certain services provided by Sinclair Broadcast Group via TBA)
- Sister stations: WWCP-TV, WJAC-TV

History
- First air date: November 28, 1974
- Former call signs: WOPC (1974–1986); WWPC-TV (1986–1988)
- Former channel numbers: Analog: 38 (UHF, 1974–1981), 23 (UHF, 1981–2009); Digital: 24 (UHF, 2002–2020)
- Former affiliations: ABC (1974–1986); Fox (1986–1988, as satellite of WWCP)
- Call sign meaning: "Altoona Television Market"

Technical information
- Licensing authority: FCC
- Facility ID: 20287
- ERP: 790 kW
- HAAT: 326 m (1,070 ft)
- Transmitter coordinates: 40°34′6″N 78°26′37″W
- Translator(s): WWCP-TV 8.2 Johnstown

Links
- Public license information: Public file; LMS
- Website: www.abc23.com

WATM-TV (channel 23) is a television station licensed to Altoona, Pennsylvania, United States, serving as the ABC affiliate for the Johnstown–Altoona–State College market. It is owned by Palm Television, L.P., which maintains a local marketing agreement (LMA) with Cunningham Broadcasting, owner of Johnstown-licensed Fox affiliate WWCP-TV (channel 8), for the provision of certain services. Both stations, in turn, are operated under a time brokerage agreement (TBA) by Sinclair Broadcast Group, owner of Johnstown-licensed dual NBC/CW+ affiliate WJAC-TV (channel 6).

WATM-TV and WWCP-TV share studios on Lulay Street in the borough of Geistown, and also operate advertising sales offices in Altoona (on East Walton Avenue/PA 764) and State College (on West Beaver Avenue/PA 26); master control and some internal operations are based at WJAC-TV's facilities on Old Hickory Lane in Upper Yoder Township. WATM-TV's transmitter is located on Lookout Road, in Logan Township, along the Cambria County line.

Since WATM-TV's signal is barely viewable in Johnstown, it is simulcast in high definition on WWCP-TV's second digital subchannel (8.2) from a transmitter along US 30/Lincoln Highway, in Ligonier Township, near the Somerset County line.

== History ==
=== As WOPC ===
This station originally signed-on November 28, 1974, as WOPC, an ABC affiliate broadcasting in analog on UHF channel 38 at a power of 21,400 watts visual and 4,270 watts aural. It was owned by John Powley, who also owned WHGM-FM (now WQWY). Powley also served as station manager.

At the time, Altoona–State College and Johnstown were separate markets. The station was unable to afford a network feed, so for most of its history, engineers simply switched to and from the signal of WTPA-TV (now WHTM-TV) in Harrisburg. It was hampered by a very weak signal. Complicating matters, Scranton's WNEP-TV had long operated two outlying translators (one presently) in State College, the second-biggest city in the area.

Already struggling for viewership, WOPC moved to the stronger channel 23 in 1981 in an attempt to improve its signal. It was seriously undermined in 1982 when Johnstown and Altoona–State College were collapsed into a single market. The station's signal was all but unviewable in the western portion of the enlarged market. As a result, it wilted away with less than one percent of the market share a year later. For the next five years, the ABC affiliation in this vast market was split between three stations in neighboring markets: WHTM reaching Altoona, WNEP serving State College, and Pittsburgh's WTAE-TV covering Johnstown.

=== As WWPC-TV ===
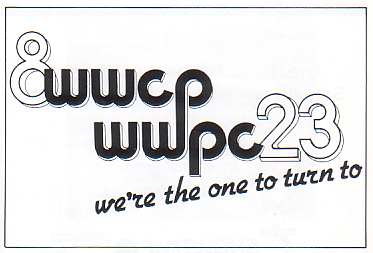
Logo from the WWCP/WWPC era.

In 1986, the owners of the market's newest station, WWCP-TV (channel 8), faced a problem. It had originally been slated to be a Pittsburgh station, but its owners petitioned the Federal Communications Commission (FCC) to move the license to Johnstown. In their petition, WWCP's owners cited lower programming costs in the Johnstown–Altoona–State College market. They also cited possible interference with WJW in Cleveland.

The FCC granted the request on condition that WWCP build its transmitter in a location that would allow Pittsburgh to get a Grade B signal from the station. However, this meant channel 8 would be virtually unviewable in the eastern portion of the area. WWCP's owners solved this problem by buying the former WOPC-TV license from Powley on February 28, 1986, at a price of $1.03 million. Following aggressive over-the-air signal testing over the summer with WWCP, along with a power increase of 186,000 watts visual and 18,600 watts aural, the former WOPC became WWPC-TV, a satellite of WWCP, on October 13, 1986.

=== As WATM-TV ===
At the time, WHTM and WTAE both preempted moderate amounts of ABC programming and it soon became obvious that Johnstown–Altoona–State College needed its own affiliate. As a result, WWPC split from WWCP and became an ABC affiliate on August 27, 1988, under new calls, WATM-TV. The station was later sold to Palm Television in order to comply with FCC ownership regulations regarding network affiliates. However, WATM is still managed by WWCP under a local marketing agreement as Peak Media, channel 8's former owner, feared that if allowed to operate separately both stations would be put in jeopardy of going dark.

=== Digital conversion ===
The digital conversion significantly improved WATM's coverage in the market. Previously, it had been plagued for most of its history by its weak 708,000 watt analog signal. The station's signal was marginal at best even in Altoona, five miles (8 km) from the transmitter. It only provided Grade B coverage of Johnstown and State College, and most viewers in this vast market could only watch it on cable. However, with the station's digital transmitter licensed for a full one million watts (the equivalent to five million watts for an analog UHF transmitter) WATM gained a coverage area comparable to the other major stations in the market. Additionally, the station was picked up on WWCP's digital subcarrier, and carries an HD simulcast of WWCP on one of its subchannels.

In November 2010, it was announced that Horseshoe Curve Communications would acquire Peak Media's assets including WWCP and its fourteen-year-old agreement to operate WATM. In February 2011, WATM added a third subchannel to their lineup in the form of a standard definition feed of This TV. On July 22, 2013, Horseshoe Curve Communications agreed to sell WWCP to Cunningham Broadcasting for $12 million. The LMA for WATM was to be included in the deal. Sinclair Broadcast Group, who already owns NBC affiliate WJAC-TV, was to assume operations of both WATM and WWCP through shared services and joint sales agreements. However, on February 20, 2014, Horseshoe Curve informed the FCC that the sale of WWCP had fallen through; two years later, on January 8, 2016, Cunningham agreed to program WWCP under a time brokerage agreement.

On January 5, 2021, Horseshoe Curve agreed again to sell WWCP-TV and the LMA with WATM-TV to Cunningham, this time for $2.85 million. The transaction was approved by the FCC on March 4 and completed on April 1.

== Newscasts ==
On January 6, 1992, WATM and WWCP established their own separate news departments in an attempt to cover their respective areas. WATM aired local news every night at 11 p.m. from its headquarters in State College. Meanwhile, WWCP offered a nightly prime time newscast at 10 p.m. (sixty minutes on weeknights; half-hour on weekends) from its studios in Johnstown. Despite a valid attempt to gain enough market share, these broadcasts barely registered as a blip in the Nielsen ratings against longer-established WJAC and WTAJ-TV that offered market-wide coverage.

Due in part to continual ratings struggles and low viewership, WATM's separate news department was shut down in December 2002 and merged with WWCP. On November 28, 2007, The Tribune Democrat reported the shared news operation of the two television stations would shut down entirely. According to a written statement, WATM and WWCP had been operating at a loss for several years and the move was desperately needed. The closure resulted in the termination of around fifteen personnel in the news and production departments. As a result, WJAC entered into a news share agreement with WWCP and WATM. While WJAC took over production of WWCP's 10 p.m. newscast, since WJAC has prior commitments with local news and weather cut-ins during Today, WATM began offering taped news updates seen at :25 and :55 past the hour during Good Morning America. From January 2008 until March 2011, WJAC simulcast its nightly newscast at 11 p.m. on WATM under the ABC 23 News branding.

At the end of 2016, WATM began airing WJAC-produced newscasts under the WATM News Centre branding (the British-style spelling of "Centre" is a pun on the station serving Centre County, which contains State College). However, the newscasts are produced at WJAC's studios on Old Hickory Lane in Upper Yoder Township and partially anchored from the State College bureau shared with WJAC (WATM features an anchor and meteorologist based at WJAC's studios in Johnstown). These newscasts can be seen at 6:30 a.m. (repeat of the previous night's 11 p.m. newscast), 6 p.m., and 11 p.m. The newscasts are also live streamed on WATM's website. In addition to sharing WJAC's facilities in State College (on West College Avenue/PA 26) and Johnstown, the station also shares WJAC's bureaus in Altoona (on Beale Avenue), and DuBois (on East DuBois Avenue/PA 255; building is shared with WIFT 102.1 FM).

On November 15, 2021, WATM-TV began airing Sinclair's The National Desk in place of the WJAC-produced early morning and late night newscasts, making them the first "Big Three" Sinclair station to air the program. This led to the elimination of WATM's morning news anchor and the WATM/WWCP meteorologist, along with the station not filling the open anchor position in State College. WWCP-TV airs The National Desk during WATM-TV's network commitments with ABC for Good Morning America.

Four years later, WATM reverted to the ABC 23 News branding (as they used prior to 2012), as the station now focuses on the entire Johnstown-Altoona television market.

== Technical information ==
=== Subchannels ===
The station's signal is multiplexed:

Subchannels of WATM-TV
| Subchannel | Res. | Short name | Programming |
|---|---|---|---|
| 23.1 | 720p | ABC | ABC |
| 23.2 | 720p | FOX | Fox (WWCP-TV) |
| 23.3 | 480i | TCN | True Crime Network |
| 23.4 | 480i | SHOPLC | Shop LC |

Simulcast of subchannels of another station

=== Analog-to-digital conversion ===
WATM-TV shut down its analog signal, over UHF channel 23, on February 17, 2009, the original target date on which full-power television stations in the United States were to transition from analog to digital broadcasts under federal mandate (which was later pushed back to June 12, 2009). The station's digital signal remained on its pre-transition UHF channel 24, using virtual channel 23.
