= WKGE =

Coordinates: 40°10′54.28″N 78°53′19.09″W

Johnstown, Pennsylvania; United States
- Broadcast area: Johnstown, Pennsylvania
- Frequency: 850 kHz
- Branding: 101.3 107.1 Jack FM

Ownership
- Owner: Edward A. Schober; (Zip2, LLC)

History
- First air date: 1925 (as WHBP)
- Last air date: 2024
- Former call signs: WHBP (1925–1929); WJAC (1929–1999); WODZ (1999–2001); WSPO (2001–2002); WLYE (2002–2004); WNTJ (2004–2008)
- Former frequencies: 1170 kHz (1925–1927); 1310 kHz (1927–1939); 1370 kHz (1939–1941); 1400 kHz (1941–1963)
- Call sign meaning: "Edge" (former format)

Technical information
- Licensing authority: FCC
- Facility ID: 72964
- Class: B
- Power: 10,000 watts unlimited

Links
- Public license information: Public file; LMS

WKGE (850 AM) was a radio station licensed to Johnstown, Pennsylvania, and broadcasting with 10 kW day and night. Its final owner was Edward A. Schober through licensee Zip2, LLC. The station operated for 99 years, from 1925 to 2024, in its last two decades spending much of its existence simulcasting other stations. WKGE used a complex directional antenna to protect other stations on 850 kHz, a factor in the station's closure.

== History ==
WKGE was first licensed on March 11, 1925, with the sequentially assigned call letters of WHBP, to the Johnstown Automobile Company at 101 Main Street, broadcasting with 10 watts on 1170 kHz.

On June 15, 1927, the station was assigned to 1310 kHz. On November 11, 1928, as part of the implementation of the Federal Radio Commission's General Order 40, WFBG in Altoona was also assigned to 1310 kHz, and the two stations had to work out a timesharing agreement. In mid-1929 the call letters were changed to WJAC, which would be used for 70 years. On July 14, 1939, WJAC moved to 1370 kHz, which allowed it to resume unlimited hours of operation. In March 1941, under the provisions of the North American Regional Broadcasting Agreement, most stations on 1370 kHz, including WJAC, were reassigned to 1400 kHz.

In 1957, WJAC applied to move to 850 kHz and increase power from 500 to 10,000 watts. At the same time Saint Francis College (now Saint Francis University) in Johnstown applied to build a new station on 1400 kHz once that frequency was vacated. WJAC's move to 850 kHz, and the establishment of the new Saint Francis station, WWSF (now WYUP), was completed in 1963. However, in contrast to the single tower non-directional antenna used on 1400 kHz, operation on 850 kHz required constructing a large and complicated nine-tower directional array, sited on 115 acres (0.47 km^{2}) in Paint Township, Somerset County, Pennsylvania.

WJAC and sister FM station WKYE were under common ownership with WJAC-TV until 1984, when both radio stations were spun off to Winston Radio, Inc. Because all three stations were owned by shareholders in the Johnstown Tribune-Democrat, the city's daily newspaper, the radio stations were sold off in order to comply with recently enacted Federal Communications Commission (FCC) regulations regarding newspaper cross-ownership in the same market.

Though the AM station was no longer co-owned with the TV station, WJAC, Inc. allowed Winston Radio to continue using the WJAC call letters for the duration of its ownership. This privilege expired upon Altoona's Forever Broadcasting's acquisition of WJAC in 1997. The station then went through a series of new call signs, starting with WODZ in 1999, WSPO in 2001, and WLYE in 2002. In 2004 Forever Broadcasting moved the calls and format of WNTJ to 850, where it had been operating as a simulcast of the news–talk programming on WNTW in Somerset, Pennsylvania.

Forever Communications announced an agreement to sell WNTJ to Birach Broadcasting Corporation of Southfield, Michigan, with the transfer of ownership finalized by the end of 2007. The high cost of maintaining the station's directional array was cited as a factor leading to the sale. According to the FCC filing, the proposed sales price for the station was $230,000. Forever retained the WNTJ call sign and news talk format, moving both back to 1490 kHz. Birach had acquired both WNTJ and WCND in Shelbyville, Kentucky, in the transaction, but no studio or office building was acquired for WNTJ. Birach—a station owner that primarily operates brokered ethnic stations in major media markets, a format unsuited to Johnstown—instead opted to simulcast talk station WWGE in Loretto, Pennsylvania, via an agreement with WWGE's owner, Pennsylvania Radiowerks. Following the sale, the station's call became WKGE in 2008. Both WKGE and WWGE went off the air during July 2012.

After being off-air since July 2012, during October 2012 WKGE was listed as silent in the FCC database. Birach Broadcasting filed July 24, 2014, for special temporary authority (STA), requesting to keep the station silent for a maximum period of 180 days from the date of filing. The FCC granted this petition on September 11, 2014. As in previous filings, ownership cited main transmitter problems as the reason to keep the station silent, and had only intended a 90-day silence period, but as that window had come and gone, it would likely remain silent for the duration of the STA. In a subsequent application, filed March 3, 2015, Birach requested an additional stay-silent authorization of 90 days while efforts continued to secure a new transmitter, as the current one was constantly failing. The FCC approved this request on April 3, 2015.

Birach Broadcasting sold WKGE to Edward A. Schober effective January 17, 2017, for $25,000. Schober subsequently assigned the station's license to his wholly owned Zip2, LLC. In mid-April the station was heard playing a mix of music for hours or days at a time without station identification. On May 2, 2017, legal IDs returned, plus a message stating that repairs to the facility were underway, so the station would be intermittently be off the air during the next few weeks. Meanwhile, a mix of music would be played. The station's carrier was initially badly distorted; presumably the aging Continental transmitter was having tube issues or possibly overheating. However, the station's clear null points in the directional pattern remained somewhat consistent (from a distance) with normal parameters. At one point, WKGE had secured a construction permit (CP) to move to 870 kHz and become a daytime-only Class D station. This included a power cut to 7 kW, and a reduction from a 9-tower to a simpler 3-tower array, utilizing one eastern, one central and one western tower of the original 9-tower array. This construction permit was never fulfilled.

Logo as "101.3 WKGE"

On March 11, 2019, WKGE launched a classic hits format, branded as "101.3 WKGE", that was simulcast on FM translator W267CM 101.3 FM in Johnstown.

On April 11, 2022, Schober sold FM translator W267CM to Lightner Communications. On that date, WKGE and W267CM began simulcasting Lightner-owned WYUP 1400 AM in Loretto and WPHB 1260 AM in Philipsburg as "107.1 and 104.3 Jack FM" with an adult hits format.

Schober surrendered the WKGE license in late July 2024, citing financial issues. The FCC cancelled the station's license on August 7, 2024.
