= WKFO =

Coordinates: 40°47′19″N 79°32′05″W

- Kittanning, Pennsylvania; United States
- Frequency: 1380 kHz
- Branding: 103.7 The River

Programming
- Format: Classic hits
- Affiliations: Pittsburgh Penguins Radio Network

Ownership
- Owner: Matthew Lightner; (Lightner Communications LLC)

History
- First air date: March 1, 1949 (as WACB)
- Former call signs: WACB (1949–1992); WTYM (1992–2021)
- Call sign meaning: Kittanning, FOrd City (communities served)

Technical information
- Licensing authority: FCC
- Facility ID: 69975
- Class: D
- Power: 1,000 watts day 28 watts night
- Translator: 103.7 W279DN (Kittanning)

Links
- Public license information: Public file; LMS
- Webcast: Listen Live
- Website: www.lightnercommunications.com/103-7-the-river/

WKFO (1380 AM) is a 24-hour commercially licensed radio station with a maximum power output of 1,000 watts, non-directional. The station, licensed to the county seat of Kittanning, Pennsylvania is wholly owned by Matthew Lightner, through licensee Lightner Communications, based in Blair County, Pennsylvania. Studios, offices and transmitter facilities are located on Bunker Hill Road, in North Buffalo Township, Pennsylvania.

== History ==
=== Beginnings as WACB ===
WKFO began broadcasting in 1949 as WACB, with the call letters standing for Armstrong County Broadcasting, the name of the original licensee, headed by its president, Lawrence Henry; and vice president Joseph B. Moore. WACB was the second radio station to come on the air in Armstrong County. The first was WAVL in nearby Apollo the year before; and the third was WKIN, which came on the air later in 1949 at 1600 kHz, but that station would later fail and its license returned to the FCC.

Armstrong County Broadcasting sold WACB in December 1964 to WACB, Inc., a company parented by Rosenblum Stations, which also owned WISR in nearby Butler, Pennsylvania. Ray Rosenblum served as president of WACB, Inc.

The station signed on the air at first with a power of 500 watts, but was granted permission in 1952 to double that amount, and began operating at its current daytime power in February 1953. WACB broadcast from its debut until about 1965 on Market street in downtown Kittanning. Like many small-town stations in the golden age of radio, the station broadcast news, music, local ball games, and the programs of the day. However, unlike its counterparts, WACB was an independently programmed station, never having any kind of a network audio affiliation until almost the end of the 20th century. It also never had a co-located FM station in its portfolio.

Shortly before its 1982 sale, the station moved from its longtime location to 221 Butler Road in West Kittanning.

WACB, Inc. ended its 18-year ownership tenure in 1981, when the company agreed to sell the station to its third owner, Nicholas Enterprises of Butler County. The station was sold to the newly formed Nicholas Broadcasting Company for $300,000 by the end of the year. It was during this ownership period that WACB experienced its largest growth until its subsequent sale in 1992.

=== Sale to Nicholas Broadcasting Company ===
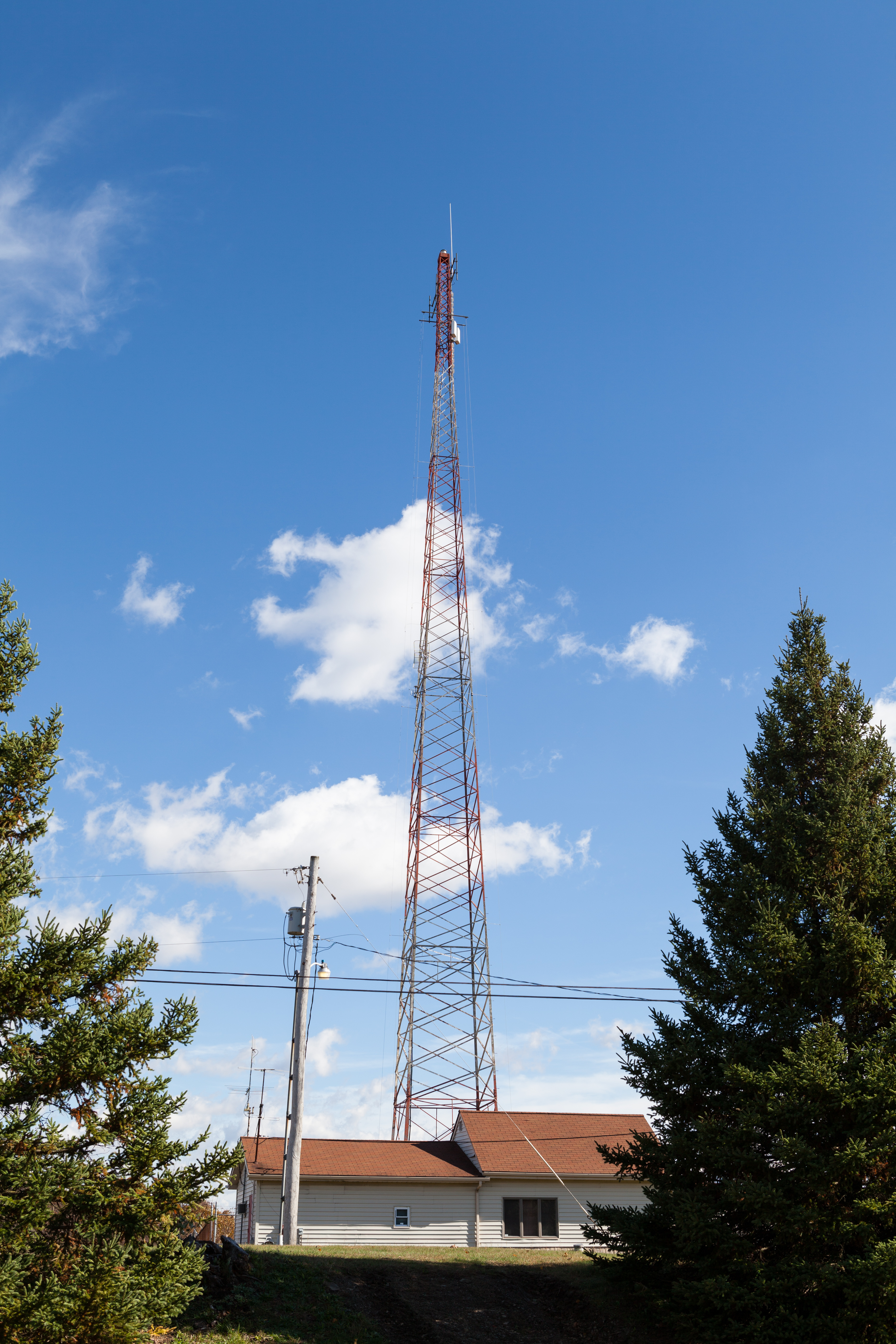
WKFO tower and studio building on Bunker Hill Road in North Buffalo Township, its studio from 1982 to 2010, and relocated there in 2021.

Upon purchasing the station, Nicholas Broadcasting Company recognized a need for more space for the station than what the building at 221 Butler Road offered. The following year, a new studio and office building was completed at the station's transmitter site on Bunker Hill Road in North Buffalo Township, Pennsylvania, about three miles southwest of Kittanning, where it remained until July 2010.

The spacious new location allowed the construction of a commercial production studio, sales offices in the basement, and a newsroom and programming office. The station was also outfitted with newer and more state-of-the-art equipment that what had been available up to that point in time.

The late 1980s were a turning point at the time for WACB. In 1987, Nicholas Broadcasting Company announced the creation of a weekly satire publication, called "Adults Exclusively Yours". The free publication, distributed in retail establishments throughout the Armstrong County area, featured weekly columns written by station personnel, a comic strip based on internal station antics called "WARP Radio", advertisements, and the weekly drawing of a $100 cash prize to a reader who could spot an intentional mistake put in the paper. Adults Exclusively Yours ceased publication in the fall of 1989.

Towards the end of 1987, after years of petitioning, WACB was finally granted limited nighttime power. Since 1985, the station operated with a PSRA power of 400 watts from sign-on until sunrise, then 55 watts PSSA that allowed the station to remain on the air no more than two hours past local sundown. The new nighttime power of 28 watts allowed WACB to stay on the air 24 hours if they liked, but ownership chose to continue signing off, though at midnight. WACB began broadcasting under their new nighttime power authority in January 1988.

Up until July 4, 1990, WACB's format had been relatively consistent for many years; a full-service news and sports formatted station playing adult contemporary and oldies music. On that day, the format switched to country. The station's moniker then changed from "The Ace of Entertainment" to "The All-American".

=== Acquisition by Vernal Enterprises, Inc. ===
In 1992, Nicholas Enterprises decided to leave the radio business and sold WACB to Vernal Enterprises, Inc. of Indiana, Pennsylvania. Upon taking over, the music portion of the format reverted to oldies (but without the adult contemporary flavor), and the station adopted the new call letters WTYM, for the new chosen moniker "Good Time Radio!".

Under Vernal's direction, the station for the first time in its history joined a network affiliation with AP Network News and Jones Satellite Network for music and DJ's (later discontinued). The station had never embraced satellite technology prior to the format change on July 22, 1992.

On that day, the station celebrated its changing of the guard that afternoon while broadcasting live from the Fort Armstrong Folk Festival, an annual event held in downtown Kittanning's Riverfront Park. John McCue, a local attorney who worked at the station during its beginnings in the 1940s, signed off the station as WACB for the very last time and new owner Larry Schrecongost then signed the station on as WTYM and under its then-new all oldies format.

=== Acquisition by Family Life Media Com, Inc. ===
Vernal owner Larry Schrecengost died unexpectedly on June 8, 2010, with the station temporarily ceasing operations a week later. On Tuesday, July 13, 2010, Vernal Enterprises announced the sale of WTYM to Family Life Media Com, Inc., which is the parent company of Family Life TV and The Kittanning Paper (but is of no relation to the Family Life Network of contemporary Christian music stations that operate in the vicinity), and was the business arm of Family Life Church, pastored by Rev. David J. Croyle. Family-Life began programming WTYM on July 26, 2010 under a Time Brokerage Agreement. The sale received final FCC approval on Friday, November 19, 2010. The sale was concluded on December 16, 2010.

Under Family Life, WTYM operated a mostly syndicated talk radio format with shows and hosts such as This Morning, America's First News with Gordon Deal, Doug Stephan, Rusty Humphries, Alex Jones and John Tesh airing during the weekday lineup.

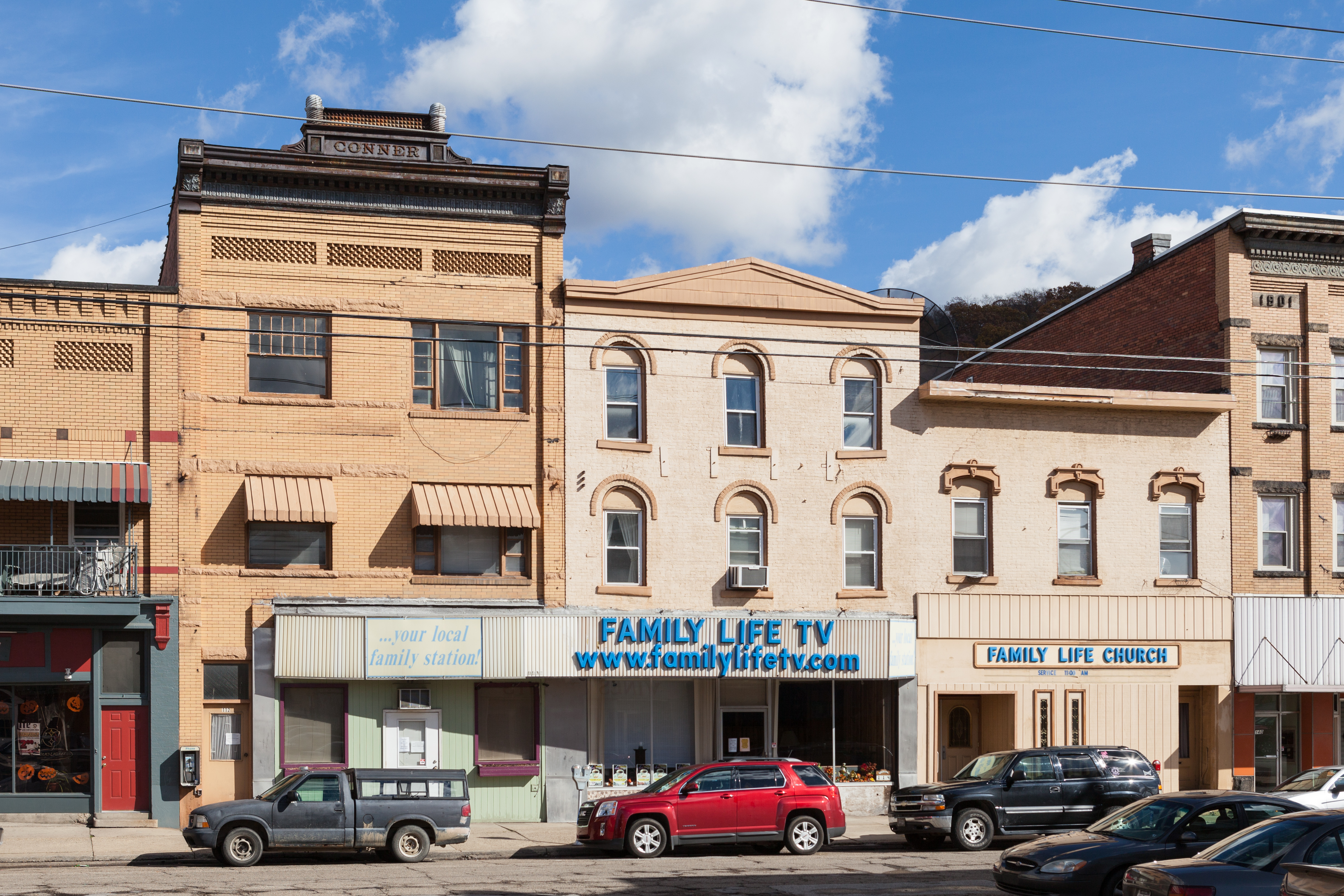
Studio at 114 South Jefferson Street in downtown Kittanning

Upon the acquisition of WTYM by Family Life Media Com, and its subsequent format change, studios were relocated to the front window at 114 South Jefferson Street in downtown Kittanning, co-located with Family Life Church (in the former State Theater building), where announcers frequently interacted with persons on the street. Through programming and active community involvement, WTYM brought back "hometown radio" to Armstrong County.

WTYM president and on-air personality David Croyle was arrested by police on August 9, 2018 for an alleged sexual assault against a 14-year-old boy. He was charged with numerous felonies. On January 10, 2020, Croyle was found guilty by a jury on all charges against him - statutory sexual assault, involuntary deviate sexual intercourse, unlawful communications and corruption of minors.

On the day of Croyle's conviction, WTYM's over the air AM and FM frequencies fell silent. However, programming was still being streamed over the internet audio feed via the station's website. One week later, the station returned to the air, but with very limited local content, relying instead on syndicated programming.

On March 6, 2020, Family Life Media-Com filed paperwork with the FCC seeking transfer of control of WTYM's license from its current board of directors to a new board composed of the three remaining members after Croyle resigned his positions as officer and director of Family Life Media-Com and Family Life Church, International. The FCC approved the transfer July 22, 2020. Family Life Church was later dissolved.

=== Acquisition by Lightner Communications ===
Shortly before Christmas 2020, the station began playing an all-Christmas music format, promoting a survey at www.radioarmstrong.com, which solicited feedback from listeners regarding the station's future, as far as music, news and local sports. In a story that ran in the December 30, 2020 issue of the Leader-Times, Lightner Communications, a Blair County-based company, announced that they were controlling programming of WTYM through a time-brokerage agreement. Since Christmas, WTYM played a continuous loop promoting the online survey and that a decision on programming would be made on Monday, January 25, 2021. One day prior, the station began playing a format of classic hits and billing itself as 103.7 the River, with the radioarmstrong.com web address redirecting to a specific page on the lightnercommunications.com website.

On June 10, 2021, the license was transferred from Family Life Media to Lightner Communications. Operations were moved back to the station's transmitter site in North Buffalo Township.

As of February 3, 2021, the station adopted a new callsign, WKFO .

== Sources ==
- 1949 Broadcasting Yearbook
- 1981 Broadcasting Yearbook
- 1981 Broadcasting Yearbook - Group Ownership
