= WFIL =

Christian radio station in Philadelphia

- Philadelphia, Pennsylvania; United States
- Broadcast area: Philadelphia metropolitan area
- Frequency: 560 kHz
- Branding: AM 560 WFIL

Programming
- Format: Christian radio
- Affiliations: SRN News

Ownership
- Owner: Salem Media Group; (Salem Communications Holding Corporation)
- Sister stations: WNTP

History
- First air date: March 18, 1922
- Former call signs: WFI (1922–1935); WFIL (1935–1989); WEAZ (1989–1993); WBEB (1993); WPHY (1993–1994)
- Call sign meaning: Combination of original call, WFI, and consolidated station WLIT

Technical information
- Licensing authority: FCC
- Facility ID: 52193
- Class: B
- Power: 5,000 watts
- Transmitter coordinates: 40°5′42.4″N 75°16′36.65″W

Links
- Public license information: Public file; LMS
- Webcast: Listen live; PLS Link
- Website: wfil.com

WFIL (560 AM) is a radio station in Philadelphia, Pennsylvania, United States, with a Christian radio format consisting of teaching and talk programs. Owned by Salem Media Group, studios and transmitter facilities are shared with co-owned WNTP (990 AM) in Lafayette Hill, Pennsylvania.

WFIL transmits fulltime with 5,000 watts, using different directional antenna configurations during the day and at night. Daytime coverage includes metropolitan Philadelphia and portions of the Lehigh Valley in Pennsylvania, plus parts of New Jersey and Delaware. Sister station WMCA in New York City, on the adjacent frequency of 570 kHz, also operates with 5,000 watts, and both stations must reduce their signals toward each other in order to avoid mutual interference.

== History ==
=== WFI ===
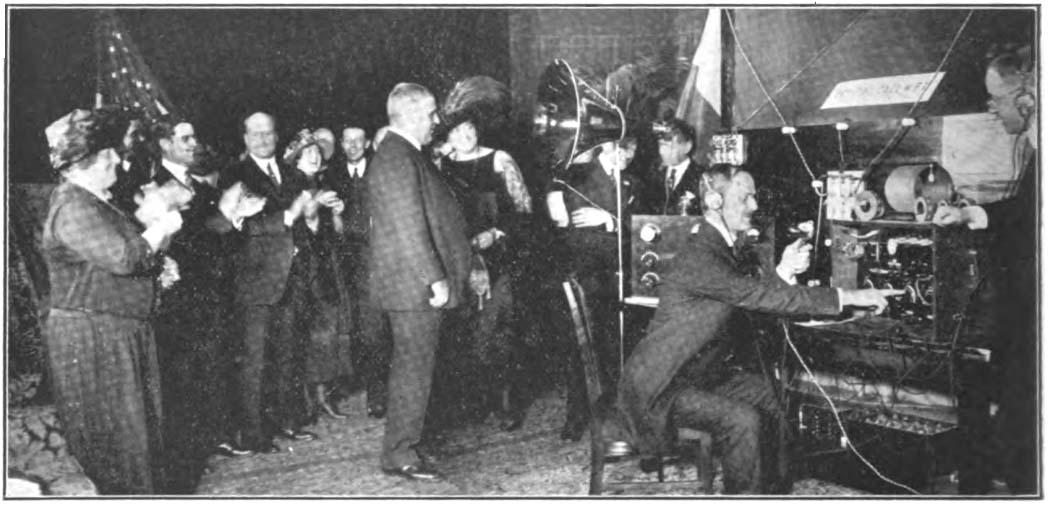
Studio photograph of WFI's formal debut broadcast on March 18, 1922.

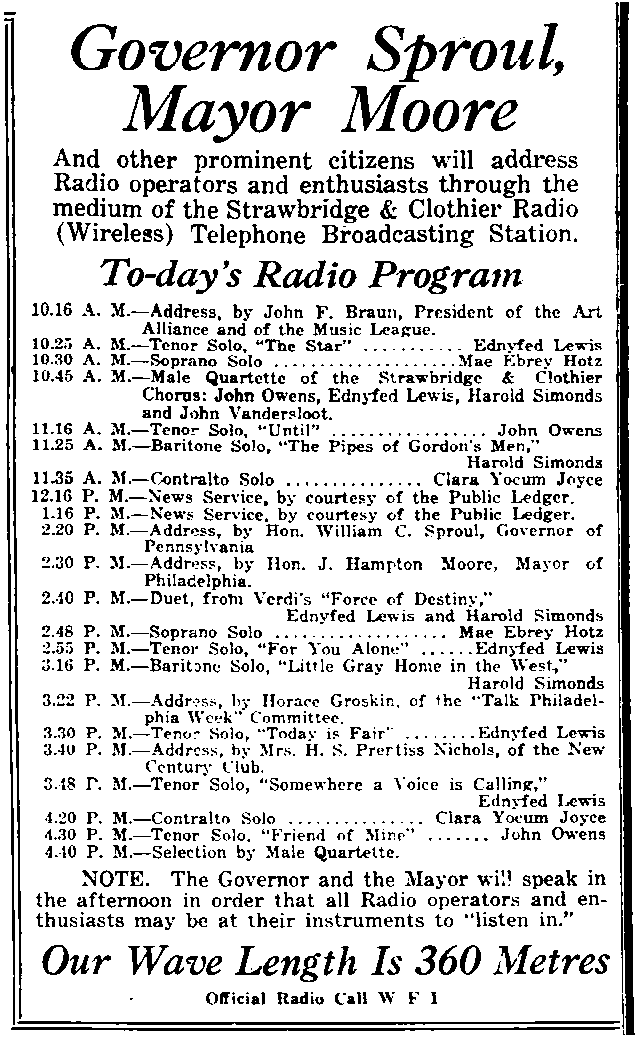
WFI's debut featured speeches by Pennsylvania Governor William C. Sproul and Philadelphia Mayor J. Hampton Moore.

On December 1, 1921, the U.S. Department of Commerce, in charge of radio at the time, adopted a regulation formally establishing a broadcasting station category, which set aside the wavelength of 360 meters (833 kHz) for entertainment broadcasts, and 485 meters (619 kHz) for market and weather reports. Philadelphia's first broadcasting station, WGL, was licensed to Thomas F. J. Howlett on February 8, 1922.

This was followed by a scramble among four of the city's department stores to become the first to establish its own station. On March 18, 1922 Strawbridge & Clothier was issued a license, with the randomly assigned call letters WFI, for a new station operating on the 360 meter "entertainment" wavelength. The station later received an additional authorization for market reports on 485 meters. The other three Philadelphia department store stations authorized in the first half of 1922 were WOO, licensed to John Wanamaker on March 18, 1922, WIP (now WTEL), licensed to Gimbel Brothers on March 20, 1922, and WDAR, licensed to the Lit Brothers on May 20, 1922.

Because at this time 360 meters was the only designated broadcasting wavelength, WFI had to operate within the restrictions of a timesharing arrangement with the other local stations. (Occasionally stations in a few other cities were unable to come to an agreement, and engaged in "jamming wars".) In the race to be the first department store on the air, WFI's formal debut broadcasts were made on March 18, starting with a 10:16 a.m. speech by John F. Braun, president of the Art Alliance and the Music League. Additional programming featured speeches by William C. Sproul, Governor of Pennsylvania, J. Hampton Moore, Mayor of Philadelphia, Mrs. H. S. Prentiss Nichols of the State Committee of Education, and Horace Groskin of the "Talk Philadelphia Week" Committee. The Gimbel Brothers station, WIP, made its formal debut the same day beginning at 11:00 a.m., although it also reported that it had made unspecified preliminary transmissions beginning at 9:00 a.m. the previous day.

Under the local timesharing agreement, WFI's schedule on 360 meters consisted of "Late news Items" at 1:16 p.m., a musical program from 3:30 to 4:30 p.m., and baseball scores from 5:30 to 6 p.m. as of August 17, 1922. On 485 meters, the station broadcast produce market and live stock reports at 10 a.m. and at 2 p.m.

In late September 1922, the Department of Commerce set aside a second entertainment wavelength, 400 meters (750 kHz) for "Class B" stations that had quality equipment and programming, and WFI was assigned use of this more exclusive wavelength, joining WOO, and later joined by WDAR and WIP. WFI's time slots were 1:15 to 2:00 p.m., 3:30 to 4:15 p.m. and 6:30 to 7:00 p.m. for entertainment programs on 400 meters, plus agricultural reports at 10 a.m. and during the early afternoon on 485 meters, as of March 27, 1923. In May 1923 additional "Class B" frequencies were made available, which included two Philadelphia allocations, with WFI and WDAR assigned to 760 kHz (395 meters) on a timesharing basis, while WOO and WIP were assigned to the second Philadelphia Class B frequency, 590 kHz.

WDAR's call sign was changed to WLIT in early 1925. As of May 31, 1927, both WFI and WLIT were assigned to 740 kHz. On November 11, 1928, as part of the implementation of a major nationwide reallocation under the provisions of the Federal Radio Commission's General Order 40, WFI and WLIT were reassigned to a "regional" frequency, 560 kHz.

=== Consolidation with WLIT as WFIL ===
By the late 1920s, WFI and WLIT, although licensed separately, were working jointly on various programs, promotions, and sponsorship efforts. In 1935, the two operators agreed to merge, with each department store having representation on the new board of directors. WLIT's final broadcast ended at 9:00 pm. on January 21, 1935. WFI's call sign was changed to WFIL, a combination of the two previous ones, which also resulted in a phonetic spelling of the first syllable of "Philadelphia". WFIL's three-hour debut broadcast came immediately after WLIT's final sign-off. It again featured a speech by Mayor Moore, along with the current governor, George Earle.

The new WFIL was an affiliate of NBC; some sources say the station never became established as either a "basic Red" or "basic Blue" outlet, but at least one early WFIL advertisement claimed that it was a "basic Blue" station. Westinghouse's KYW had replaced WFI-WLIT as the NBC primary for Philadelphia when it moved in from Chicago, Illinois, a few years before. WFIL had a secondary affiliation with the Mutual Broadcasting System in the late 1930s and early 1940s, until WIP became a primary Mutual station. Starting in December 1944 the station produced Hayloft Hoedown, picked up by ABC Radio in 1945.

WFIL was purchased in 1947 by Walter Annenberg's Triangle Publications, which also owned The Philadelphia Inquirer. By then WFIL was an affiliate of the newly named ABC Radio Network. WFIL's sister stations under Triangle Publications ownership were WFIL-FM and WFIL-TV in Philadelphia; WNHC AM-FM-TV in New Haven, Connecticut; KFRE AM-FM-TV in Fresno, California; WFBG AM-FM-TV in Altoona, Pennsylvania; WNBF AM-FM-TV in Binghamton, New York; and WLYH-TV in Lancaster/Lebanon, Pennsylvania. Triangle Publications sold WFIL AM-FM-TV to Capital Cities Broadcasting in 1971 with the radio stations spun off to new owners, WFIL to LIN Broadcasting and WFIL-FM to Richer Communications which changed the call letters to WIOQ. WFIL-TV took on the new call letters of WPVI-TV.

- WFIL Studio
- U.S. National Register of Historic Places
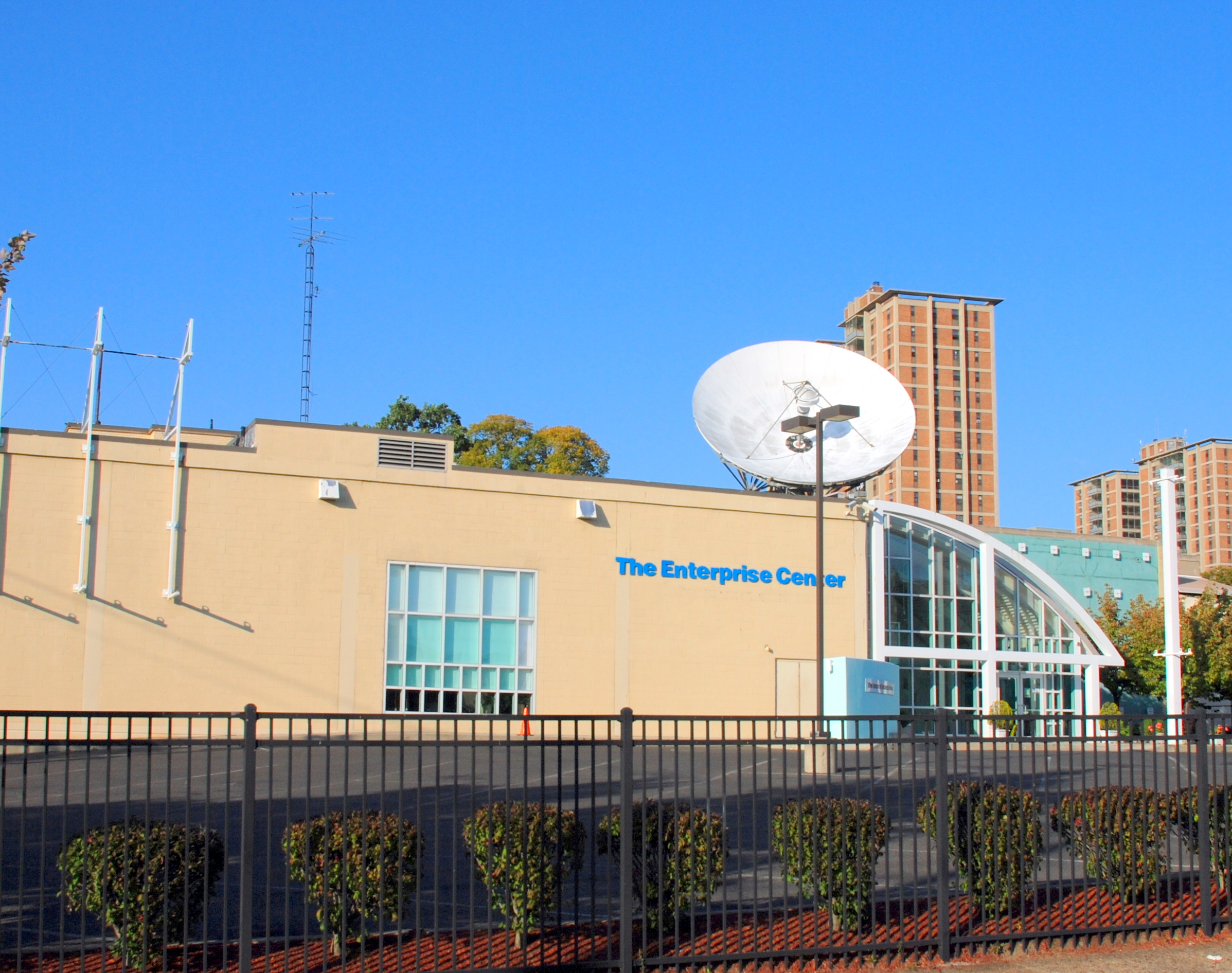

- Location within Philadelphia Location within Pennsylvania Location within the United States
- Location: 4548 Market St. Philadelphia, Pennsylvania
- Coordinates: 39°57′28.56″N 75°12′47.08″W
- Built: 1948
- Architect: Savery, Scheetz & Gilmour; Abraham Levy
- Architectural style: Moderne
- NRHP reference No.: 86002092
- Added to NRHP: July 28, 1986

=== Emergence of two rock and roll legends ===
Studios for the early WFIL radio stations were in the Widener Building in downtown Philadelphia. Under Triangle Publications' ownership the stations were moved to a new broadcast facility at 46th and Market Street in West Philadelphia adjacent to the Arena, the first broadcast facility in the nation specifically designed for television broadcasting. It was in this new broadcast center that Triangle began broadcasting Bandstand (later called American Bandstand), first with Bob Horn, then with Dick Clark as host. Clark started on WFIL radio as a disc jockey in 1952, arriving from Utica, New York. He continued hosting the TV program for 31 years, the last 30 as a national show carried by the ABC Television Network. Clark moved the program to Hollywood in 1964. Shortly after Clark's emergence on the national stage, he became a major figure in the early days of rock and roll as "Bandstand" proved pivotal in helping promote the major stars of the era.

The WFIL studio at 4548 Market Street was listed on the National Register of Historic Places in 1986 for its significance as one of the first buildings constructed specifically for television broadcasting, as well as being the site for American Bandstand.

=== Settling into a new home ===
In February 1964, Triangle moved the WFIL stations to a new state-of-the-art broadcast center at the corner of City Line Avenue and Monument Road in Philadelphia, from which WPVI continues to broadcast.

Starting on September 18, 1966, WFIL began playing "Top 40" rock and roll. It quickly became the most successful non-RKO "Boss Radio" formatted station, known locally as "The Pop Explosion". The original line up of air personalities, or "Boss Jocks" had the following schedules: 6-10 am: Chuck Browning; 10am-2pm: Jay Cook; 2-6pm: Jim Nettleton ("Diamond Jim" Nettleton); 6-10pm: George Michael ("King George" Michael); 10pm-2am: Long John Wade; 2-6am: Dave Parks ("Dave the Rave" Parks). Weekends featured Frank Kingston Smith.

WIBG was WFIL's main rock 'n roll rival in the late 1960s and early 1970s. In its rock-and-roll heyday, WFIL was known colloquially as "Famous 56" and employed the slogan "Rockin' in the Cradle of Liberty." Its 5000-watt transmitter and low dial position enabled its signal to be heard as far away at times as Staten Island, the southernmost borough of New York City. During its top 40 years, WFIL also consistently showed strongly in the ratings books in nearby Wilmington, Delaware, where it has an excellent signal. In addition, WFIL was a popular listening choice in Reading and Allentown, both in Pennsylvania. WFIL announcers heard in later years of the Top 40 era included Dr. Don Rose, Jim O'Brien (who later also became a WPVI-TV weather broadcaster and station personality), Dan Donovan, J. J. Jeffrey, Dick Heatherton, Tom Dooley, "Tiny" Tom Tyler, Mitch "K.C." Hill, "Big" Ron O'Brien, Kris Chandler, Geoff Richards, Joel Denver, Brother Lee Love (Alan Smith), and Banana Joe Montione.

The format evolved into adult contemporary in the fall of 1977. At some point after that, the WFIL studios were relocated to Domino Lane in the Roxborough section of Philadelphia; they moved into the building of FM station WUSL, which WFIL owner LIN Broadcasting had acquired in late 1976. Growing competition from FM stations in this period did serious damage to WFIL's ratings. In September 1981 country music was tried, but this failed to reverse the downward trend. The station switched to an "oldies" format in September 1983, called "The Boss is Back", with a new line up of "Boss Jocks", playing the hits of 1955 through 1973. This format lasted until April 8, 1987, when new owner WEAZ Inc. discontinued locally originated music programming in favor of Transtar's "Oldies Channel", a satellite-delivered service. The end of live programming was marked by a production piece consisting of a portion of the song American City Suite by Terry Cashman and Tommy West interspersed with old WFIL airchecks. The "Epilogue to WFIL" was produced by Charlie Mills, who at the time was working cross-town at WPEN, and had been an avid fan of WFIL during his teen years.

Sister station WMCA (at 570) in New York City has had a similar history: both were Top 40 stations in the 1960s, both underwent a format evolution as AM radio faded as a music medium, and both have a Christian/religious format today. Both stations also maintained Call For Action telephone help lines, being among the first radio stations in the United States to do so. The telephone number of WFIL's Call For Action line was GReenwood 7-5312. (Under the present-day North American Numbering Plan, the primary telephone numbering plan in the United States, this number would have corresponded to (215) 477-5312.)

In November 1987 FM stations WOGL and WIOQ both adopted oldies formats and quickly won the majority of the oldies audience. The Oldies Channel format continued with minimal success and listenership until 1989, when WFIL quietly began simulcasting sister station Easy 101.1 WEAZ (which had a soft adult contemporary format by then). Soon thereafter, the FM became WEAZ-FM so that WFIL could become WEAZ. In September 1991, the AM launched a mostly automated "beautiful music" format known as "Wish", a play on the old WWSH station which had a similar format in Philadelphia back in the 1970s. Then on May 26, 1993, WEAZ became WBEB while WEAZ-FM became WBEB-FM.

The AM station was sold for $4 million in October 1993 to Salem Communications (which had almost bought the station three years earlier for $6.5 million but backed out of the deal at the last minute) and on November 1, 1993, the station was renamed WPHY, with a religious format focusing on Christian talk and teaching. WBEB-FM then became WBEB and to this day, continues on with its adult contemporary format. The Christian teaching and talk format is still in use today.

After a TV station in South Carolina was randomly assigned the calls, but decided not to use them when signing-on, Salem reclaimed the historic call sign, and the call letters returned to WFIL on September 6, 1994.

== See also ==
- List of initial AM-band station grants in the United States
