= Sam Kass =

American chef, former policy advisor, and news personality

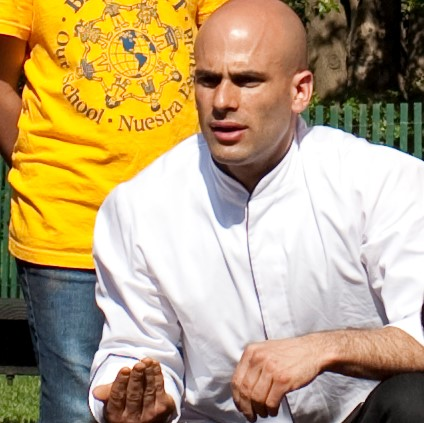
- Kass in 2009
- Born: Samuel David Kass; 1979 or 1980; Chicago, Illinois, U.S.
- Education: University of Chicago (AB)
- Occupations: Chef, Nutrition Policy Consultant
- Spouse: Alex Wagner (m. 2014; div. 2025)
- Children: 2
- Parent(s): Valentine Hertz Kass; Robert Kass
- Family: Helen Valentine (great-grandmother)

Samuel David Kass (born 1979 or 1980) is an American chef, food policy advisor, and news personality. He served as President Barack Obama's Senior Policy Advisor for Nutrition Policy, executive director for First Lady Michelle Obama's Let's Move! campaign, and as an assistant chef in the White House. In 2015 he was appointed senior food analyst at NBC News, covering topics such as healthy eating and food trends. In May 2016, Kass became a partner in newly-launched venture capital fund Acre Venture Partners, remaining with the company as of October 2026.

== Early life and education ==
Samuel David Kass was born in 1979 or 1980 into a Jewish family in the Hyde Park neighborhood of Chicago. His father, Robert, was a teacher at the private, co-ed University of Chicago Laboratory Schools who taught President Obama's daughter Malia Obama in the 5th grade. Kass' mother, Valentine (née Hertz), is a science educator at the National Science Foundation and previously served as the director of Omnimax productions at the Museum of Science and Industry. His maternal great-grandmother, Helen Valentine, founded Seventeen magazine.

Kass attended high school at the Lab Schools, where he was on the varsity baseball team, and graduated in 1998. He played baseball as a center fielder on a scholarship at Kansas City Kansas Community College and later transferred to Triton College. He graduated with an AB in history in 2004 from the University of Chicago, where he also played NCAA Division III baseball as a right fielder with a career .366 batting average, ranking among the best in program history.

During his junior year of college, Kass worked at the restaurant 312 Chicago under chef Dean Zanella. In 2003, Kass finished his senior year of college abroad, training under chef Christian Domschitz in Vienna, Austria. He continued his training while traveling around the world, including to New Zealand, Italy, and Mexico, before returning to Chicago in 2006 to work at the restaurant Avec under executive chef Paul Kahan.

== Career ==
In 2007, Kass opened his own personal chef company in Chicago, Inevitable Table, which focused on healthful and nutritious food. He then became the personal chef to the Obamas while Barack Obama was serving in the United States Senate.

=== White House (2009–2015) ===
In January 2009, Kass went to work at the White House Office as First Lady Michelle Obama's Food Initiative coordinator, and joined the kitchen staff as an assistant chef under executive chef Cris Comerford. Kass is a promoter of sustainable farming and locally grown and organic foods and is a critic of modern agricultural producers and fertilizer and pesticide companies. The messaging on food promoted by the Obamas was criticized in 2009 by the Mid America CropLife Association and the American Council on Science and Health its unwillingness to acknowledge the benefits of pesticides and chemical fertilizers as well as the high cost of organic farming relative to corporate farming.

In 2010, Kass was promoted to senior policy advisor for Healthy Food Initiatives. In 2013, Kass was named Let's Move! executive director and promoted to senior policy advisor for nutrition policy. In these roles, Kass assisted Michelle Obama in creating the first major vegetable garden at the White House since Eleanor Roosevelt's victory garden. The garden did not use herbicides, pesticides, or chemical fertilizer.

Kass also assisted the First Lady in her efforts to promote healthy eating and the prevention of childhood obesity. He was the chief architect of the Let's Move! campaign, which utilized private-sector partnerships to pursue the goal of reducing childhood obesity to 5% by 2030. He has also railed against the national lunch program as "disproportionately high in fat, preservatives and high fructose corn syrup."

In 2012, Kass was named to the inaugural class of chefs in the American Chef Corps, a project he created with the US Department of State in conjunction with the James Beard Foundation to promote global diplomacy through culinary initiatives. Kass made his first solo trip abroad for the program in July 2014, spending a week in the Republic of Korea. During his visit sponsored by the US Embassy and Brand USA, Kass promoted Let's Move!, met with culinary students, celebrated Independence Day at the US Embassy's party, learned to cook the traditional dish Bulgogi at the request of President Obama, and promoted culinary tourism to the US.

In 2014, Kass requested to speak at the School Nutrition Association's convention in Boston. However, his request was denied due to Kass' advisory position at the White House and the strains between the association and the first lady.

On December 8, 2014, the White House announced Kass' departure, issuing a statement in which Barack and Michelle Obama saluted his "tenure of dedicated service." Barack Obama noted Kass's achievements such as constructing the Kitchen Garden and brewing the White House's own Honey Brown Ale, and said that he had inspired families and children to lead healthier lives. Michelle Obama recalled his early involvement in Let's Move! from its inception "around my kitchen table in Chicago... to setting the strategic vision of a national campaign in the White House, to spearheading efforts with the private sector across the country. Sam leaves an extraordinary legacy of progress, including healthier food options in grocery store aisles, more nutritious school lunches, and new efforts that have improved how healthy food is marketed to our kids". Kass's last official day at the White House was Friday, December 19, 2014.

=== 2016–present ===
As of May 2015, Kass was a partner in Sprig, a meal-delivery service based in the San Francisco Bay Area, founded in 2013. He joined the project as an investor when Sprig announced a $45 million funding round.

On July 29, 2015, Kass was appointed senior food analyst at NBC News.

In January 2016, Kass launched a food technology company, TROVE, an investment, strategy, and communications consultancy created to "work with corporations both big and small who are serious about transforming our health, climate and planet through food."

In April 2016, California-based food technology company Innit, Inc. announced Kass had joined the team as its chief consumer experience officer.

In May 2016, Kass became a partner in the newly-launched venture capital fund Acre Venture Partners, a $125 million fund designed to inspire "collaborative disruption" with projects that focus on "transparency, health, and sustainability" in the global "food system". Campbell Soup is the sole limited partner in the fund, which is independent of the packaged-food company. As of October 2026, he still runs the company.

== Other activities ==
In November 2015, Kass delivered a TED Talk in Manhattan, titled "Want kids to learn well? Feed them well". TED Talks Live writes that, in this talk, Kass "discusses the role schools can play in nourishing students' bodies in addition to their minds".

Kass appears in a documentary film presented by English actor Benedict Cumberbatch, titled How to Live on Earth, which was released on YouTube on 20 September 2026. The film is about how we can live in ways that help to protect nature and the planet.

== Recognition and awards ==
He was named #11 on Fast Company magazine's 2011 list of 100 Most Creative People for his work with Let's Move!, in particular for a five-year partnership pledge from grocery giant Walmart, which announced a commitment to build up to 300 stores in areas defined as "food deserts", lower the price of its fruits and vegetables, and reduce the sugar, salt, and fat in its private-label products on its shelves.

In July 2015, Kass was named a Director's Fellow at the MIT Media Lab in Cambridge, Massachusetts.

In October 2015, the James Beard Foundation honored Kass with its 2015 Leadership Award "for his work toward nationwide food-policy initiatives that focus on sustainable and nutritious ingredients, and efforts to raise awareness of childhood obesity, hunger, and nutrition issues."

In February 2016, Woman's Day magazine named Kass one of its Red Dress Awards honorees, an annual award for outstanding achievement in encouraging health and fitness.

In March 2017, the World Economic Forum (WEF) named Kass to its 2017 Class of Young Global Leaders, intended to recognize people under the age of 40 who the WEF considers to be "pushing boundaries and rethinking the world around them."

In October 2026, Kass was the recipient of the Julia Child Award.

== Personal life ==
After stepping down from his post at the White House, Kass moved to Brooklyn, New York.

In September 2013, Kass became engaged to MSNBC television anchor Alex Wagner. On August 30, 2014, Kass and Wagner were married in a ceremony at the restaurant Blue Hill at Stone Barns in Pocantico Hills, New York. The President, First Lady, and their daughters attended the wedding. In 2017, Wagner gave birth to their son, Cy, and a second son, Rafael, was born in 2019. In 2025, Wagner announced that she and Kass were divorced.
