= Estelle Ellis =

American business consultant

Estelle Ruth Ellis (12 November 1919 – 1 July 2012) was an American business consultant known for her work with Condé Nast, Carter Hawley Hale, Phillips-Van Heusen, Dow Chemical, and Kimberly-Clark Corporation.

== Career ==
Ellis began her career at Popular Science magazine. In 1943, she joined Seventeen as sales director under founding editor Helen Valentine, becoming the magazine’s first marketing director. Her work established teenage girls as a distinct consumer demographic.

In the 1970s, Ellis consulted for Brides magazine.

== Personal life ==
Ellis was married to Samuel I. Rubenstein for 50 years until his death. They had two children: Ellis Marc Rubenstein (President of the New York Academy of Sciences) and Nora Jane Rubenstein (ethnographer and writer).
