= WPRR =

WPRR may refer to:

== Radio stations ==
- WPRR (AM), a radio station (1680 AM) licensed to serve Ada, Michigan, United States
- WPRR-FM, a radio station (90.1 FM) licensed to serve Clyde Township, Michigan
- WNTJ, a radio station (1490 AM) licensed to serve Johnstown, Pennsylvania, United States, which held the call sign WPRR from 2005 to 2008
- WALY (FM), a radio station (100.1 FM) licensed to serve Altoona, Pennsylvania, which held the call sign WPRR from 1980 to 2005

== Other uses ==
- Willamette and Pacific Railroad - Abbreviated as WPRR in its reporting mark.
