= WNTP =

News/talk radio station in Philadelphia

- Philadelphia, Pennsylvania; United States
- Broadcast area: Philadelphia metropolitan area
- Frequency: 990 kHz
- Branding: AM 990 The Answer

Programming
- Language: English
- Format: Conservative talk radio
- Affiliations: Compass Media Networks; Salem Radio Network; Townhall News

Ownership
- Owner: Salem Media Group; (Salem Communications Holding Corporation)
- Sister stations: WFIL

History
- First air date: 1925
- Former call signs: WIBG (1925–1977); WZZD (1977–2004)
- Call sign meaning: "News–talk Philadelphia"

Technical information
- Licensing authority: FCC
- Facility ID: 52194
- Class: B
- Power: 50,000 watts day; 10,000 watts night
- Transmitter coordinates: 40°5′43.4″N 75°16′35.65″W

Links
- Public license information: Public file; LMS
- Webcast: Listen live; Listen live (via Audacy); Listen live (via iHeartRadio)
- Website: 990theanswer.com

WNTP (990 kHz) is a commercial radio station in Philadelphia, Pennsylvania. WNTP is owned by the Salem Media Group and broadcasts a conservative talk radio format. Most of the programming comes from the co-owned Salem Radio Network including nationally syndicated hosts Mike Gallagher, Hugh Hewitt, Dennis Prager, Sebastian Gorka, Charlie Kirk, Brandon Tatum and Eric Metaxas. A local weekday wake-up show is hosted by Chris Stigall.

By day, WNTP is powered at 50,000 watts, the maximum for U.S. commercial AM stations. To protect other stations at night, WNTP reduces power to 10,000 watts at sunset. It uses a directional antenna with a four-tower array. The station's studios and transmitter facilities are shared with co-owned WFIL on Ridge Pike in Lafayette Hill, Pennsylvania.

== History ==
=== Early years ===
The station first signed on the air in 1925, as WIBG, which stood for "I Believe in God". It was a Christian radio station owned by St. Paul's Episcopal Church. In the 1930s, WIBG was a daytimer, broadcasting at 500 watts on 970 kilocycles, licensed to the suburb of Glenside, and required to go off the air at night.

With the enactment of the North American Regional Broadcasting Agreement (NARBA) in 1941, WIBG moved to its present frequency on 990 AM. It increased its power to 1,000 watts, its city of license was moved to Philadelphia, and it was given permission to broadcast around the clock at 10,000 watts, by installing a directional antenna.

In the 1940s, the Morning Cheer program presented by George A. Palmer was a weekday Christian broadcast between 7:00am – 8:00am. Beginning in 1945, a Wanamaker Organ concert was broadcast live from Wanamaker's Philadelphia department store each Monday through Saturday from 10:05 to 10:30 am.

=== Top 40 ===
In the 1960s, WIBG became a Top 40 radio station. "Wibbage" had great success playing contemporary hits with popular hosts including Joe "The Rockin' Bird" Niagara, Hy Lit, Billy Wright Sr., Frank X. Feller, and others.

In September 1966, rival station 560 WFIL flipped to a Top 40 format and before long passed WIBG in the ratings. WFIL's signal in the growing Philadelphia suburbs was stronger and WIBG was hampered by a poor suburban nighttime signal. WIBG soldiered on as a Top 40 station through most of the first half of the 1970s, including radio greats John Records Landecker, and Johnny "Long John" Wade. It also tried album rock for a time early in the decade. At mid-decade, the station tried a more adult contemporary approach, with sports talk at night. For the 1976 season, it was the flagship station for Philadelphia Phillies baseball.

WIBG and overnight talk show host Don Cannon were featured in the famous "egg yolk drinking" scene in the 1976 film Rocky, playing in the background while the Philadelphia fighter (played by Sylvester Stallone) cracks six raw eggs into a glass and chugs them down.

=== WZZD ===
In 1977, management decided that the WIBG image and call sign were no longer an asset. After a highly publicized final week featuring many of the personalities from the station's peak years, the call letters were changed to WZZD.

The station began to call itself The All New Wizzard 100, and adopted a heavily researched Top 40 format. Listeners did not respond, and the format was changed to disco music, which did not fare much better. In 1980, the station was sold to Christian broadcaster Communicom, which began airing contemporary Christian music and Christian talk and teaching shows. The station had a schedule similar to sister station (and another former top 40 station) WWDJ in the New York City radio market. WZZD played music about half the day and Christian programs and features during the other half of the day.

The WZZD antenna was redesigned in 1986 to reduce the number of towers. (Note: From 5 to 4; the 5th tower's footing, which is northwest of the present Tower 1, can be seen on aerial views.) It improved coverage to the north and west, a change that if it had been made in the 1960s may have improved the success of WIBG in its battle with WFIL.

In 1994, Communicom sold WZZD to Salem Communications. Under Salem, WZZD kept the Christian music and teaching format initially. But by the late 1990s, music was cut back to a couple of hours a day. By 2002, WZZD ran nearly all teaching and almost no music at all.

=== WNTP ===
In 2004, WZZD and WFIL's features and programs were merged onto WFIL as WZZD dropped the Christian format in favor of conservative talk. It changed its call letters to WNTP, to stand for "News Talk Philadelphia". Beginning in 2006, WNTP became the flagship station for the Saint Joseph's University Hawks college basketball radio network, as well as airing college sports of Penn State University, Drexel University, and the University of Pennsylvania for the Philadelphia audience.

In 2007, WNTP again redesigned and modified its daytime antenna, which improved its signal in the suburban counties around Philadelphia.

On November 4, 2019, WNTP rebranded as "Philadelphia's AM 990 The Answer". Most Salem talk stations, including WNYM in New York (the former WWDJ) and KRLA in Los Angeles, call themselves "The Answer".
