= WQWY =

Simulcast of WOWY, State College

Bellwood, Pennsylvania; United States
- Broadcast area: Altoona, Pennsylvania
- Frequency: 103.9 MHz
- Branding: WOWY 103.9

Programming
- Format: Classic hits

Ownership
- Owner: Seven Mountains Media; (Southern Belle Media Family, LLC)
- Sister stations: WALY, WFBG, WFGY, WRKY-FM, WTNA

History
- First air date: March 28, 1970 (as WHGM)
- Former call signs: WHGM (1966–1987); WALY (1987–2023)
- Call sign meaning: similar to WOWY

Technical information
- Licensing authority: FCC
- Facility ID: 58312
- Class: A
- ERP: 380 watts
- HAAT: 280 meters (920 ft)
- Transmitter coordinates: 40°33′57″N 78°26′36″W

Links
- Public license information: Public file; LMS
- Webcast: Listen Live
- Website: wowyonline.com

WQWY (103.9 FM, "WOWY 103.9") is an American radio station serving the Altoona, Pennsylvania, area. The station is owned by Seven Mountains Media. currently playing a classic hits format, simulcasting WOWY from State College.

== History ==
The station began playing a format of Top 40 and middle of the road music in its early days, first signing on as WHGM on March 28, 1970, more than three and a half years after the construction permit had been issued in the spring of 1966.

WHGM was originally owned by John Powley, whose interests were primarily in television. Powley owned a financial stake in KHFI AM-FM-TV in Austin, Texas, and would sign on an ABC-TV affiliate in Altoona six years later, known as WOPC-TV.

On New Year's Eve of 1986, the station was sold to Mid-Atlantic Radio, Inc., a company headed by Gregory Guise. The sale happened about ten months after Powley had sold the license of his television station, which had been silenced due to financial problems. The format was then changed to adult contemporary and the station moved from its transmitter location atop Wopsononock Mountain in Dysart to downtown Altoona. The following March 9, 1987, the call sign was changed to WALY. WALY was later used on a Local Access Channel in the early 90s.

The station was sold again to S&P Broadcasting in February 1989 for $1 million, and then to Forever Broadcasting, Inc. in 1997.

Founder John Powley died in 2008.

It was announced on October 12, 2022, that Forever Media was selling 34 stations and 12 translators, including WALY and the entire Altoona cluster, to State College-based Seven Mountains Media for $17.375 million. The deal closed on January 1, 2023.

On March 23, 2023, WALY changed its format from adult contemporary to a simulcast of classic hits-formatted WOWY in State College. The call sign changed to WQWY on March 27, 2023; the WALY call sign moved to WWOT, which also picked up WALY's adult contemporary format.

== Sister stations ==
The sister stations of WQWY in the Altoona market are 98.1 WFGY, 100.1 WALY, 104.9 WRKY-FM, 1290 WFBG, and 1430 WTNA.
