= Helen Valentine =

American magazine founder and editor

- Born: Helen Rose Lachman; 1893; Manhattan
- Died: 1986 (aged 92–93); Miami, Florida
- Occupations: Magazine editor Copy writer
- Employers: Lord & Thomas; Seventeen; Charm
- Known for: Founder of Seventeen
- Title: President of "The Fashion Group International" (1948-1949)
- Spouse: Herbert Valentine
- Children: 2
- Family: Sam Kass (great-grandson)

Helen Valentine (1893–1986) was the founder and editor in chief of Seventeen and Charm magazines.

== Early life and education ==
Born Helen Rose Lachman in Manhattan, she was the only child of German Jewish immigrants. Her father Gustave was an accountant and her mother Bertha (née Kahn) was a homemaker. Although she attended temple with her mother and went to Jewish Sunday school, her family also celebrated Christmas. She graduated from the Ethical Culture School and Barnard College.

== Career ==
After school, she worked in the magazine industry. Beginning as a part-time copy writer for Lord & Thomas, Valentine was among the first fired from the advertising firm when the Great Depression began.

In 1944, while serving as promotion director for Mademoiselle magazine at Walter Annenberg's Triangle Publications, she was asked by Annenberg to help revive a movie magazine. Although the concept of "teenager" as a distinct demographic segment of the population was a relatively new idea at that time, Valentine proposed a magazine for teen-age girls. Noticing the wide popularity of a King Features Syndicate comic strip by cartoonist Hilda Terry that focused on the trials and tribulations of a typical teenager's life entitled Teena which began running in July 1944, Valentine convinced Annenberg that teenage girls needed a magazine of their own. Valentine believed that teenage girls were an underserved demographic and had the potential to become an important and lucrative new consumer market segment. She stated that "it was time to treat children as adults." The magazine was launched in September 1944 and within eighteen months, Seventeen had a circulation of a million. Seventeen is credited with creating a teen market for clothing manufacturers and other industries.

The magazine was named after the Booth Tarkington novel of same name.

From 1948-1949, Valentine served as president of Fashion Group International, an organization created in the 1930s by a group of business women working in fashion.

In 1950, she accepted a job with Street & Smith to revamp a fading women's magazine called Charm which she re-configured into the country's first fashion magazine for working women. Valentine focused on another demographic she believed was not represented by current magazines: married women who work. Charm was eventually merged into Glamour magazine after being bought by Conde Nast Publications.

One of Valentine's talks, "How to Keep More of the Money You Earn" was published in the second session of the 83rd Congress (1954). because of Henry M. Jackson, a senator from Washington State. This talk contributed to legislation that would grant tax relief to married women who work.

In 1958, Valentine was hired by Good Housekeeping magazine to write a column, Young Wife's World, where she remained until she retired in 1963.

== Personal life ==
Valentine was married to banker Herbert Valentine (died 1978). She had two children: Barbara Valentine Hertz and Barry Valentine. Her granddaughter, Valentine Hertz Kass was one of the first women producer/directors at KQED in San Francisco, the first director of the Navy Pier IMAX Theater, and the founding director of the American Children's Television Festival. Her great-grandson, Sam Kass, served as Barack Obama's Senior Policy Advisor For Nutrition Policy. Valentine died in 1986 in Miami at her daughter's home.
