= Triangle Publications =

American media group

Triangle Publications, Inc.
- Type: Private
- Industry: Broadcasting, publications including TV Guide
- Founded: 1946; 80 years ago
- Founder: Walter Annenberg
- Defunct: 1988; 38 years ago
- Fate: Liquidated
- Successor: Knight Newspapers (newspapers); Capital Cities and Gateway Communications (television stations); News Corporation (TV Guide)
- Headquarters: Radnor, Pennsylvania, United States

Triangle Publications Inc. was an American media group based first in Philadelphia, and later in Radnor, Pennsylvania. It was a privately held corporation, with the majority of its stock owned by Walter Annenberg and his sisters. Its holdings consisted of newspapers, magazines, and radio stations. After nearly two decades of divestiture, it was folded into News Corporation, owned by Rupert Murdoch, in 1988.

== History ==
Upon his father's death in 1942, Walter Annenberg assumed responsibility for Triangle which had been formed from the assets and properties of the Cecelia Corporation, a company founded by his father, Moses Annenberg, in 1923, and named for his mother, Sarah "Sadie" Cecelia Annenberg. Cecelia Corporation's assets at the time included the Daily Racing Form, the Morning Telegraph in New York City, and The Philadelphia Inquirer, a daily newspaper based in Philadelphia. At the time Walter and his sisters inherited Triangle in 1942 it was worth $4 million.

In 1944 Annenberg started Seventeen magazine, which his sister Enid Haupt edited. In 1953 he started TV Guide which was the best-selling magazine in the country in the 1960s. It later started or acquired other publications, including Armstrong Daily, the Philadelphia Daily News, Good Food magazine, and Official Detective magazine.

In the 1950s Triangle began buying radio and TV stations including WFIL-AM-FM-TV in Philadelphia, WLYH-TV in Lancaster and Lebanon, Pennsylvania, WFBG-AM-FM-TV in Altoona and Johnstown, Pennsylvania, WNHC AM-FM-TV in New Haven, Connecticut, WNBF-AM-FM-TV in Binghamton, New York, and KFRE AM-FM-TV in Fresno, California.

Triangle owned cable TV operations in various regions including Suburban Cable TV Co. in suburban Philadelphia, Empire State Cable TV Co. in New York, and New Haven Cable TV Co. in Connecticut. It also owned ITA Electronics, a broadcasting equipment manufacturer based in Lansdowne, Pennsylvania, McMurray Printers, a small job press printer in Miami, McMurray Publishing Co., Ltd, which published the Canadian editions of TV Guide, Triangle Circulation, which handled the nationwide distribution of Triangle's magazines and those of other publishers, and Educasting, a developer of educational programming.

== Print publications ==
Triangle's original flagship ventures were The Daily Racing Form, The Philadelphia Inquirer and WFIL. The Inquirer became Philadelphia's only major morning daily paper in 1947, after the Philadelphia Record filed for bankruptcy. In 1957, Walter Annenberg acquired the Philadelphia Daily News and merged its facilities with the Inquirer's.

Triangle was probably best known for its primary magazine publication, TV Guide. Against the advice of his close advisors, Annenberg purchased various local TV listing magazines (TV List, TV Digest, TeleVision Guide, TV Guide) and merged them into one national weekly publication under the name TV Guide. The magazine provided local listings with feature stories and soon became the largest national weekly publication, reaching up to 23 million households at its peak in the 1970s. The 15-cents-per-copy digest-sized publication could be found at every supermarket checkout and generally sold out within a few days. The immediate success of TV Guide required Triangle to, in the later 1950s, move TV Guide's operations out of a small office on South Broad Street in Philadelphia to a new, sprawling facility at 250 King of Prussia Road in suburban Radnor, Pennsylvania. This new facility housed all aspects of the publication, including managerial, marketing, production, photography, editorial and subscription services. The wrap-around color portion of the magazine was printed at Triangle's state-of-the-art rotogravure plant at 440 North Broad Street in Philadelphia, adjacent to the Philadelphia Inquirer Building. Triangle Publications also maintained TV Guide sales offices in major metropolitan areas throughout the nation. In the 1960s it became the best selling magazine. At its peak the circulation was 20 million copies a week.

Another Triangle success was Seventeen magazine, a publication started by Annenberg in 1944, featuring fashion tips and advice for teenage girls. Seventeen was published monthly and, like TV Guide, maintained a strong subscription base.

America's horse racing enthusiasts relied heavily on the information and statistics provided in another of Triangle's publications, the Daily Racing Form. Established in 1894 by Frank Brunell, the Form started as a tabloid with regional distribution and was purchased by Moses Annenberg in 1922. Triangle merged the regional editions into a single broadsheet in the early 1970s when it moved operations into a new facility in Hightstown, New Jersey. The Daily Racing Form was one of Triangle's most profitable publications. A sister newspaper, The Morning Telegraph, was closed by Triangle during a strike.

In the early 1970s, Triangle launched Good Food, a digest-sized publication featuring recipes and feature stories, targeting average households. The magazine was designed and marketed along the same lines as TV Guide. Publication of the magazine was suspended in 1974. It was later revived, in 1985, with Alexandra Mayes Birnbaum as the editor-in-chief, who was succeeded by Annie Pleshette Murphy. It was similarly marketed, alongside TV Guide, in supermarkets. It was aimed at middle-class shoppers, introducing them to new produce and new cooking ideas and techniques. It had several columnists, including Road Food is Good Food by Jane and Michael Stern, instruction in microwave cooking and other features. Sarah Scrymser was the Production Director. Tally Sue Hohlfeld was the Copy Editor, Saul Davis was the Editorial Production Assistant. It was a fairly small but effective, well-organized staff of less than thirty people. Lori Longbotham and Barbara Ottenhoff were leaders of the test kitchen recipe editing. Good Food was shut down in 1988 after Triangle Communications was sold, as it was not yet fully profitable.

== Broadcasting ==
Triangle entered the broadcasting industry with the 1947 purchase of WFIL in Philadelphia from the department stores Lit Brothers and Strawbridge and Clothier. WFIL had evolved from Lit Brothers' WLIT (original call letters were WDAR) and Strawbridge's WFI radio stations, which had in the early days of commercial radio shared time on the same frequency. Walter Annenberg became interested in WFIL as it was one of the few radio stations that had FCC approval to also run a television station. Annenberg was granted the license to start WFIL-TV (now WPVI). Triangle also pioneered the concept of facsimile transmission (fax) over an FM band, transmitting its Philadelphia Inquirer as WFIL-FX. This innovative concept was short-lived as receiving equipment was both expensive and sparsely available for the average homeowner. Triangle's WFIL-TV was the first affiliate of the new American Broadcasting Company (ABC) network. While owned by Triangle, WFIL's AM, FM, and television stations were first broadcast from the Widener Building in Center City, Philadelphia. In 1948, Triangle built the first broadcast center specifically designed for television, at 4645 Market Street in Philadelphia, which later became the home of American Bandstand with Dick Clark. Triangle had hired Clark in 1952 to be an announcer, and, later, a DJ, on WFIL-AM. Clark became host of WFIL-TV's Bandstand program when the original host, Bob Horn, was arrested for alleged impaired driving in the midst of an anti-drunk-driving campaign by the Triangle-owned Philadelphia Inquirer.

Triangle expanded its broadcast interest during the 1950s and 1960s to include WNHC AM-FM-TV, Binghamton, New York's WNBF AM-FM-TV, Lebanon, Pennsylvania's WLYH-TV, Altoona, Pennsylvania's WFBG AM-FM-TV, and Fresno's KFRE AM-FM-TV. Triangle's broadcasting operations also reflected Walter Annenberg's interest and commitment to education, with the establishment of various over-the-airwaves educational programs and the "Educasting" operation. The broadcasting unit, Triangle Broadcasting, also operated a syndication program unit, Triangle Program Sales, which was formed in 1963 to handle syndicated programs originating at the Triangle stations. In January 1964, Triangle moved its WFIL stations and broadcasting division operations into a new state-of-the-art facility at 4100 City Avenue in the suburban Philadelphia Main Line region.

WFIL-TV is credited with pioneering the "Action News" format.

== Liquidation of assets ==
In 1969, Triangle Publications sold The Philadelphia Inquirer and the Philadelphia Daily News to Knight Newspapers (later Knight-Ridder Newspapers) for $55M to comply with federal regulations restricting ownership of multiple media outlets within the same market. Pennsylvania Governor Milton Shapp had complained that Triangle had used its three Pennsylvania television stations in a smear campaign against him.

Triangle began unwinding its broadcasting operations with the sale of WFIL-TV, WNHC-TV, KFRE-TV and Triangle Program Services in 1971 to Capital Cities Communications, followed by the remaining stations in 1972 to Gateway Communications, a new company formed by former Triangle employees. Gateway made its move in 1974 by acquiring non-Triangle station and an ABC affiliate WHTN-TV from Reeves Telecom, and rechristened as WOWK-TV in 1975. In 1988, Triangle Publications' remaining assets were sold to Rupert Murdoch's News Corporation for US$3 billion (equivalent to $7 billion in 2025), in one of the largest financial transactions of the time.

== Former Triangle assets ==
=== Newspapers ===
- Philadelphia Daily News
- The Philadelphia Inquirer

=== Periodicals ===
- Click
- Daily Racing Form
- Good Food Magazine
- Movie-Radio Guide
  - known as Movie and Radio Guide, through to issue cover-dated September 21–27 1940, while still published by Triangle's predecessor, the Cecelia Corporation
  - known as Radio Guide when launched in 1931, with then 23-year-old Walter Annenberg, future Triangle owner, serving as Secretary-Treasurer
- Seventeen
- Stardom
- TV Guide

=== Television and radio ===
Two boldface asterisks appearing following a station's call letters (**) indicate a station built and signed on by Triangle Publications.

Stations owned by Triangle Publications
Media market	State	Station	Purchased	Sold	Notes
Fresno	California	KFRE	1959	1971	
Fresno	California	KFRE-FM	1959	1971	
Fresno	California	KFRE-TV	1959	1971	
New Haven–Hartford	Connecticut	WNHC	1956	1971	
New Haven–Hartford	Connecticut	WNHC-FM	1956	1971	
New Haven–Hartford	Connecticut	WNHC-TV	1956	1971	
Binghamton	New York	WNBF	1955	1972	
Binghamton	New York	WNBF-FM **	1956	1972	
Binghamton	New York	WNBF-TV	1955	1972	
Altoona–Johnstown	Pennsylvania	WFBG	1956	1972	
Altoona–Johnstown	Pennsylvania	WFBG-FM **	1960	1972	
Altoona–Johnstown	Pennsylvania	WFBG-TV	1956	1972	
Lebanon–Lancaster–Harrisburg	Pennsylvania	WLYH-TV	1957	1972	(Note: Known as WLBR-TV prior to 1959.)
Philadelphia	Pennsylvania	WFIL	1947	1971	
Philadelphia	Pennsylvania	WFIL-FM	1948	1971	
Philadelphia	Pennsylvania	WFIL-TV **	1947	1971	
