= WRKY-FM =

- Hollidaysburg, Pennsylvania; United States
- Broadcast area: Altoona, Pennsylvania
- Frequency: 104.9 MHz
- Branding: Rocky 104.9

Programming
- Format: Classic rock
- Affiliations: United Stations Radio Networks; Penn State Sports Network; Pittsburgh Steelers Audio Network

Ownership
- Owner: Seven Mountains Media; (Southern Belle Media Family, LLC)
- Sister stations: WALY; WFBG; WFGY; WQWY; WTNA

History
- First air date: December 1, 1978
- Former call signs: WHPA (1978–1997); WMXV (1997–1999); WMAJ-FM (1999–2004)
- Call sign meaning: "Rocky"

Technical information
- Licensing authority: FCC
- Facility ID: 72316
- Class: A
- ERP: 730 watts
- HAAT: 276 meters (906 ft)
- Transmitter coordinates: 40°34′1.2″N 78°26′31″W

Links
- Public license information: Public file; LMS
- Webcast: Listen live
- Website: rocky1049.com

WRKY-FM (104.9 MHz) is a classic rock formatted broadcast radio station licensed to Hollidaysburg, Pennsylvania, serving Altoona, Pennsylvania. WRKY-FM is owned and operated by Seven Mountains Media.
