= WTNA =

Radio station in Altoona, Pennsylvania

Coordinates: 40°29′47.3″N 78°24′04″W

Simulcasting WOWY State College
- Altoona, Pennsylvania; United States
- Broadcast area: Altoona metropolitan area
- Frequency: 1430 kHz
- Branding: WOWY 99.7

Programming
- Format: Classic hits

Ownership
- Owner: Seven Mountains Media; (Southern Belle Media Family, LLC)
- Sister stations: WALY, WFBG, WFGY, WQWY, WRKY-FM

History
- First air date: November 9, 1948 (first license granted, as WVAM)
- Former call signs: WVAM (1948–2019)
- Call sign meaning: "Toona" (previous format)

Technical information
- Licensing authority: FCC
- Facility ID: 47089
- Class: D
- Power: 5,000 watts day; 25 watts night
- Translator: 99.7 W259DG (Altoona)

Links
- Public license information: Public file; LMS
- Webcast: Listen Live
- Website: wowyonline.com

WTNA (1430 AM) is a radio station in Altoona, Pennsylvania, United States. The station airs a classic hits format and is branded as "WOWY 99.7". The station is owned by Seven Mountains Media, through licensee Southern Belle Media Family, LLC.

WTNA is the Altoona affiliate of Penn State Sports including Football, Hockey, and Men's Basketball

== History ==
Originally WVAM, it became a CBS affiliate when it went on the air on December 15, 1947. At that time, it operated on 1430 kHz with 1,000 watts power.

On February 6, 2019, WVAM changed its format from sports to oldies, branded as "Toona 1430". On March 15, 2019, the station changed its call sign to WTNA.

In November 2020, the station launched a 250-watt translator on 99.7 to serve the Altoona area. With the launch of the translator, the branding was adjusted to "Toona 1430 & 99.7".

== Sale to Seven Mountains Media ==
It was announced on October 12, 2022 that Forever Media was selling 34 stations, including WTNA and the entire Altoona cluster, to State College-based Seven Mountains Media for $17.375 million. The deal closed on January 1, 2023.

On March 23, 2023, WTNA changed its format from oldies to a simulcast of classic hits-formatted WOWY 103.1 FM State College.

== Changes ==
On January 2, 2013, the station dropped the Jim Rome Show and replaced it with The Herd with Colin Cowherd.

== Previous logo ==
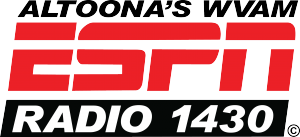
