= Hayloft Hoedown =

Hayloft Hoedown is an early American country music program on local, and then national, radio and television from Philadelphia, Pennsylvania. The show began in December 1944 as a live radio show from Town Hall on WFIL-AM, and was picked up by ABC Radio in 1945.

WFIL-TV produced a TV version for ABC-TV, which carried the show from July 10–September 16, 1948, on Saturday nights from 9 to 9:30 p.m. Eastern Time. The program, one of the first on ABC, was televised from Town Hall in Center City. It included square dancing, singing yodeling and comedy routines and was hosted by Jack Steck w/ Brothers Elmer and "Pancake" Pete Newman, who held summer shows and rodeos at their Sleepy Hollow Ranch near Quakertown, Pennsylvania, and headed the Sleepy Hollow Ranch Gang. The Murray Sisters were the brothers' wives. The cast included:

- Florence Bendon aka Carol Wynn
- Jack Day
- The Stump Jumpers
- The Murray Sisters
- The Circle A Ranch Square Dancers
- Elton Britt
- Ray Whitley
- Bill Haley and the Saddlemen
- Jesse Rogers
- Wesley Tuttle
- The Sleepy Hollow Ranch Gang (Elmer and Pete Newman, Julie and Sophie Murray, Monte Rosci, Hank Harrigan and Pee Wee Miller)

== Louisville, Kentucky program ==
Hayloft Hoedown was also the name of a long-running local program on WHAS-TV in Louisville, Kentucky from 1951 to 1971, which was revived briefly on WLKY-TV in 1971.
