= WALY (FM) =

Radio station in Altoona, Pennsylvania

Coordinates: 40.570°N 78.440°W

Altoona, Pennsylvania; United States
- Broadcast area: Altoona, Pennsylvania
- Frequency: 100.1 MHz
- Branding: WALY 100.1

Programming
- Format: Adult contemporary
- Affiliations: Compass Media Networks

Ownership
- Owner: Seven Mountains Media; (Southern Belle Media Family, LLC)
- Sister stations: WFBG, WFGY, WQWY, WRKY-FM, WTNA

History
- First air date: January 27, 1954 (first license granted)
- Former call signs: WVAM-FM (1953–1980); WPRR (1980–2005); WWOT (2005–2023)

Technical information
- Licensing authority: FCC
- Facility ID: 47090
- Class: B1
- ERP: 3,000 watts
- HAAT: 291 meters (955 ft)

Links
- Public license information: Public file; LMS
- Webcast: Listen Live
- Website: walyradio.com

WALY (100.1 MHz) is an adult contemporary music formatted FM radio station in Altoona, Pennsylvania. The station is owned by Seven Mountains Media. The station has an ERP of 3,000 watts.

== History of the 100.1 frequency ==
=== As WVAM-FM ===
The station was originally licensed on January 27, 1954, as WVAM-FM and was owned first by The General Broadcasting Corporation, and then by Blair County Broadcasters Incorporated. WVAM-FM was initially an automated Drake-Chenault Top-40 station until 1980. Top-40 initially aired on WVAM (1430 AM) before the launch of WVAM-FM. When the FM station was launched, WVAM was changed to a country format.

=== Sale to Phyldel Communications ===
In 1979, Blair County Broadcasters Inc., the owners of WVAM-FM and WVAM, were charged with engaging in fraudulent billing practices by the FCC and order to either sell the stations or facing a hearing. The fraudulent charges occurred with billing advertisers. The two stations were sold to Phyldel Communications Corp. in September 1980 for $913,000.

=== 1980 studio fire ===
In April 1980, a fire occurred at the stations' main office at West Albert Drive. The station was silenced for a day due to the fire. When returning on air, WVAM had to use borrowed equipment at a lesser power of 20 watts instead of the typical 3,000. New transmitters allowed the station to return to 3,000 watts on May 5, 1980. Operations were moved to a trailer parked on station grounds until May 6, 1980. The fire was caused by a faulty ballast in a fluorescent light fixture and resulted in an estimated $225,000 in damage. The new equipment resulted in technical problems at the stations temporarily location, which lead to WVAM moving operations to avoid radio interference.

=== Altoona's Power Station WPRR ===
On December 26, 1980, the station changed its call sign to WPRR becoming America's 1st FM station to have the "Power" moniker/branding and changed format from an automated Top 40 format to an AOR format. WPRR changed formats again in the mid-1980s to automated Top 40/CHR. By 1986, a full on-air staff was hired and automation was no longer used.

One of its most popular features in the 1990s was the morning show with WLS' morning veteran alum Tommy Edwards and Danice Bell which aired every Monday through Friday, other on air popular personalities to pass through WPRR during both the 1980s and 1990s were Scott St. John, Dave McCall, Steve Hilton, Bob McCarty, Dave Austin, J.B. Savage, Kristen Fox, Chad Bender, Jimmy Hatch, Darrell Ray, Bill Kurtis, Johnny "Hollywood John" Harlow, with Douglas "Doug Yoel" Thomas, and Richie Dennis.

In 1999, WPRR was known as "Central PA's #1 Hit Music Station! 100.1 WPRR" and had a slogan of "Serving all of Central Pennsylvania: Altoona, State College." In 2000, WPRR was rated second in Altoona with a market share of 11.5.

WPRR Was known as "Today's Hit Music! Power 100 FM WPRR" in the 2000s and remained a Top 40/CHR station until its call sign was changed in 2005 as WWOT.

=== WWOT ===
The station changed the call letters from WPRR to WWOT on March 15, 2005, but shortly after changing their call letters WWOT call themselves as "The New Hot 100" but kept their Top 40/CHR format until 2022.

It was announced on October 12, 2022, that Forever Media was selling 34 stations and 12 translators, including WWOT and the entire Altoona cluster, to State College-based Seven Mountains Media for $17.375 million. The deal closed on January 1, 2023.

=== WALY ===
On March 23, 2023, WWOT changed its format from Top 40/CHR to adult contemporary, which moved from 103.9 FM. The WALY call sign moved from 103.9 to 100.1 on March 27.

== Conflict with 100.1 in Romney, West Virginia ==
As one travels southbound on Interstate 99 towards Bedford, Pennsylvania, WALY's signal will start to conflict with WVMD in Romney, West Virginia, a country station. Romney is located near the intersection of US 220, US 50 and West Virginia Route 28.

Temperature inversions can cause FM signals to travel farther, but the two stations are operating within Federal Communications Commission guidelines.
