= WTAJ-TV =

Television station in Altoona, Pennsylvania

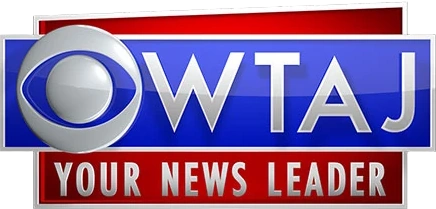
- Altoona–Johnstown–; State College, Pennsylvania; United States
- City: Altoona, Pennsylvania
- Channels: Digital: 24 (UHF); Virtual: 10
- Branding: WTAJ

Programming
- Affiliations: 10.1: CBS; for others, see § Subchannels

Ownership
- Owner: Nexstar Media Group; (Nexstar Media Inc.)

History
- First air date: March 1, 1953
- Former call signs: WFBG-TV (1953–1972)
- Former channel numbers: Analog: 10 (VHF, 1953–2009); Digital: 32 (UHF, 2002–2019)
- Former affiliations: Both secondary: ABC (1953–1974); DuMont (1953–1955)
- Call sign meaning: "Television for Altoona–Johnstown"

Technical information
- Licensing authority: FCC
- Facility ID: 23341
- ERP: 788 kW
- HAAT: 327 m (1,073 ft)
- Transmitter coordinates: 40°34′1″N 78°26′29″W

Links
- Public license information: Public file; LMS
- Website: www.wtaj.com

WTAJ-TV (channel 10) is a television station licensed to Altoona, Pennsylvania, United States, serving the Johnstown–Altoona–State College market as an affiliate of CBS. Owned by Nexstar Media Group, the station maintains studios on 6th Avenue in Altoona and a transmitter in Logan Township.

== History ==
The station signed on March 1, 1953, as WFBG-TV, as a sister station to WFBG (1290 AM) and WFBG-FM (98.1, now WFGY). In the station's early days, all programs were produced and transmitted live from the studios on Wopsononock Mountain in Altoona; the WFBG stations moved in 1959 to a new studio facility on 6th Avenue, where channel 10 continues to operate from today. Channel 10 was one of the strongest stations in the entire country, utilizing over 300,000 watts to serve its coverage area (most of which is a very rugged dissected plateau). The station could be seen as far west as Pittsburgh and as far east as State College.

At its sign-on, WFBG-TV aired selected programming from all four television networks of the time: ABC, CBS, NBC and the long-defunct DuMont Television Network. In 1955, when DuMont ceased most network operations, WFBG became a primary CBS affiliate although it continued to carry a secondary affiliation with ABC until the early 1970s, usually carrying some of ABC's higher-rated shows. In 1956, WFBG-AM-FM-TV was sold to the Annenberg family's Triangle Publications.

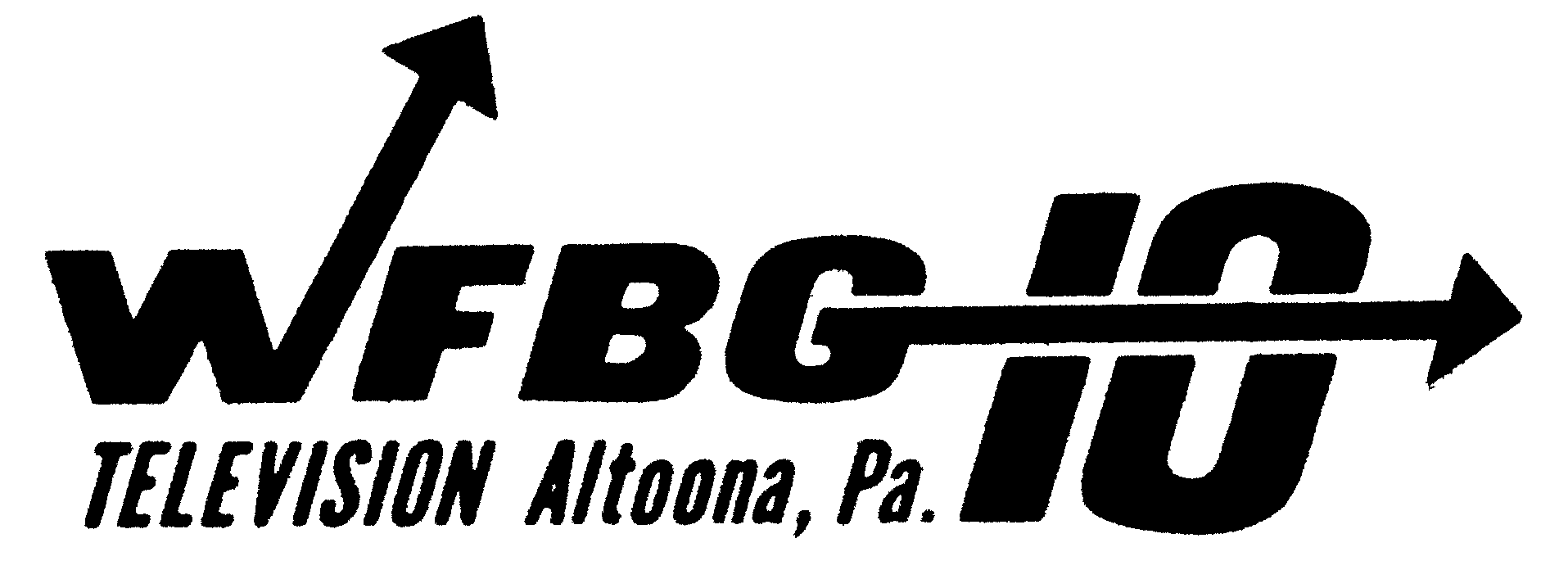
The last logo used by WFBG-TV before the station’s callsign was changed in 1972.

In 1969, then-Governor of Pennsylvania Milton J. Shapp accused Triangle of using its three Pennsylvania television stations—WFBG-TV, WFIL-TV (now WPVI-TV) in Philadelphia and WLYH-TV (now WXBU) in Lebanon—to conduct a smear campaign against him. The Federal Communications Commission (FCC) found that the charges were true, and forced Triangle to unload all of its broadcasting properties. Following a large divestiture of stations to Capital Cities Communications in early 1971, Triangle sold its remaining outlets, including the WFBG stations, to Gateway Communications in December 1971. The sale was finalized in September 1972, with the radio stations spun off to its general manager in accordance with FCC's cross-ownership policy, and channel 10 being renamed as WTAJ-TV; the new call letters were chosen to acknowledge the station's large viewership in Johnstown. Although Johnstown had a CBS affiliate for its portion of the market, WJNL-TV (channel 19), channel 10 had long claimed Johnstown as part of its primary coverage area; it provided a strong city-grade signal to almost the entire Johnstown market. Until the mid-1980s, it was also available on many cable systems in the Pittsburgh area because Pittsburgh's CBS affiliate, KDKA-TV, preempted a decent amount of CBS shows and most of the uncleared programs aired on WTAJ.

In 1978, WTAJ became the exclusive CBS affiliate for the market. The "battle" between channels 10 and 19 was not even close, as WJNL's signal had always been marginal at best even in Johnstown and could not be seen at all in most of the eastern portion of the market. Its over-the-air signal barely reached Altoona and just missed State College. WJNL changed its calls to WFAT in 1983, and struggled as a low-rated independent station for a decade before going dark in 1991; the frequency was eventually reallocated to the Pittsburgh area, and is now home to that market's independent station, WPKD-TV.

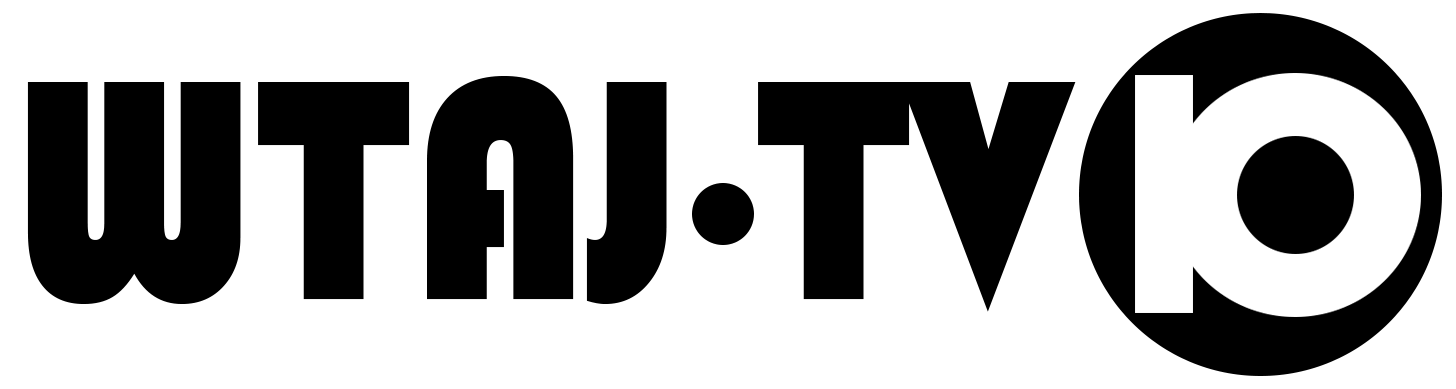
WTAJ-TV's logo, used from 1972 until 1995. Other stations owned by Gateway Communications also employed a similarly styled logo.

Gateway Communications merged with SJL Broadcasting in December 2000. SJL changed its name to Montecito Broadcast Group in 2005. Montecito put WTAJ and two of its other stations in the Northeast—WLYH and Binghamton, New York's WBNG-TV—up for sale shortly after it purchased four television stations (KHON-TV in Honolulu, Hawaii, KOIN in Portland, Oregon, KSNT in Topeka, Kansas, and KSNW in Wichita, Kansas) from Emmis Communications. Granite Broadcasting has since purchased WBNG, and on July 26, 2006, Nexstar Broadcasting Group purchased WTAJ and WLYH for $56 million. Nexstar's acquisition was completed on December 29, 2006.

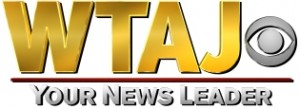
WTAJ's logo from January 28, 2008, through January 31, 2013

=== 60th anniversary ===
On March 1, 2013, WTAJ kicked off its 60th anniversary with a celebration from the Altoona location of Wolf Furniture. The special included archival clips from WFBG/WTAJ and a look back at their first 60 years. Special segments continued throughout the year.

== News operation ==
WTAJ's news operation has seen many changes through its more than 5½ decades, both in personnel and technology. Early personalities anchoring news, sports and weather in the 1950s and 1960s included Ted Reinhart, Charlie Ritchey, Big John Riley, Ted Johnson, Charlie Flynn, Bob James, Dick Richards, Jon Schwartz, and Wes Maley. In September 1972, just shortly before the sale of the station to Gateway Communications was finalized, Vice President and General Manager John Stilli stepped down and was succeeded by Ian K. Harrower, who would lead the station into its transition from WFBG to WTAJ. A news director and anchorman named Bob Moore moved to Altoona from Washington, D.C. Also joining TV 10 news was Pam Jenkins, the first female news correspondent from Penn State University. John Riley, Wes Maley, and Ted Johnson stayed on board after the change, but eventually John Riley would be the lone survivor of the on-the-air personalities.

In December 1973, Pam Jenkins left to get married and relocate and in January 1974, Bob Moore left to return to Washington, D.C. as a journalist. This began a new era of Action News when the station over the next few months hired five new young people: news director/anchorman Tim Fritz, reporters and weekend anchors Eric Rabe and Karen Nash, Sports Director George McKenzie and reporter Jon McClintock. Out of these five, Rabe and McClintock became the veterans. They both stayed until October 1979 when Rabe (who succeeded Tim Fritz as news director/anchorman in January 1976) moved on to field reporting in Philadelphia and Jon McClintock simultaneously left to create and head up the Blair County Bureau at WJAC-TV (channel 6) in Johnstown.

Vice President and General Manager Ian K. Harrower said he would hire a news director and an anchorman rather than give both jobs to one man. He hired news director Jim Thompson and anchorman Patrick Van Horn; both subsequently moved on and were succeeded by a number of different people over the next three decades. General Manager Ian Harrower left in February 1980 and was succeeded by J. Thomas Conners. That position has had several men come and go over the past three decades, also. The station suffered a devastating loss in early December 1982 when veteran weatherman John Riley suffered a brain aneurysm from which he never recovered; he remained in a coma for over three years and eventually died in April 1986. In the intervening years, the station has had many anchors and reporters come and go.

In late May 2007, WTAJ launched a redesigned website. On January 28, 2008, the station unveiled a new logo, slogan, and a re-designed set to replace the old set that had been used since 1995. The station also announced plans to enlarge its coverage in Johnstown since WWCP-TV and WATM have shut down their news department. Plans include a new Cambria County newsroom.

On September 12, 2011, WTAJ debuted an hour-long 4 p.m. newscast called Central PA Live. The program is the Johnstown–Altoona–State College market's first 4 p.m. newscast which replaced Oprah. It features topics pertaining to various news stories, along with lifestyle content; it utilizes social media platforms like Facebook and Twitter to allow viewer discussions.

On November 9, 2011, WTAJ was in the national spotlight when one of its news trucks was flipped over by Penn State students (along with its windshield getting smashed), as it was covering the riots on the PSU campus following the firing of head football coach Joe Paterno due to the Jerry Sandusky child molestation scandal.

WTAJ-TV began broadcasting its newscasts in high definition on January 31, 2013. As part of the conversion, the station built a new set and introduced a new logo.

== Technical information ==
=== Subchannels ===
The station's signal is multiplexed:

Subchannels of WTAJ-TV
| Channel | Res. | Short name | Programming |
|---|---|---|---|
| 10.1 | 1080i | WTAJ-HD | CBS |
| 10.2 | 480i | Mystery | Ion Mystery |
| 10.3 | 480i | Laff | Laff |
| 10.4 | 480i | Grit | Grit |

On June 15, 2016, Nexstar announced that it has entered into an affiliation agreement with Katz Broadcasting for the Escape (now Ion Mystery), Laff, Grit, and Bounce TV networks (the last one of which is owned by Bounce Media LLC, whose COO Jonathan Katz is president/CEO of Katz Broadcasting), bringing one or more of the four networks to 81 stations owned and/or operated by Nexstar, including WTAJ-TV. (Grit was also available in Johnstown on WJAC-DT4 until June 1, 2017, when it was replaced by TBD. It moved to WTAJ in October 2017).

=== Analog-to-digital conversion ===
WTAJ-TV shut down its analog signal, over VHF channel 10, on June 12, 2009, the official date on which full-power television stations in the United States transitioned from analog to digital broadcasts under federal mandate. The station's digital signal remained on its pre-transition UHF channel 32, using virtual channel 10.
