= WXBU =

Television station in Lancaster, Pennsylvania

- Lancaster–Lebanon–Harrisburg–; York, Pennsylvania; United States
- City: Lancaster, Pennsylvania
- Channels: Digital: 32 (UHF), shared with WHP-TV; Virtual: 15
- Branding: Univision 15

Programming
- Affiliations: 15.1: Univision

Ownership
- Owner: Sinclair Broadcast Group; (WXBU Licensee, LLC)
- Sister stations: WHP-TV

History
- First air date: October 25, 1953
- Former call signs: WLBR-TV (1953–1959); WLYH-TV (1959–2016)
- Former channel numbers: Analog: 15 (UHF, 1953–2009); Digital: 23 (UHF, 2002–2017), 21 (UHF, 2017–2019)
- Former affiliations: Independent (1953–1954); Dark (1954–1957); ABC (1957–1963); CBS (1963–1995); UPN (1995–2006); The CW (2006–2016); Grit (2016–2017); Comet (2017–2020); TBD (2020–2024)
- Call sign meaning: Xavier B. Underwood (creative director for former owner Howard Stirk Holdings)

Technical information
- Licensing authority: FCC
- Facility ID: 23338
- ERP: 1,000 kW
- HAAT: 369 m (1,211 ft)
- Transmitter coordinates: 40°20′43.1″N 76°52′8.3″W

Links
- Public license information: Public file; LMS

WXBU (channel 15) is a television station licensed to Lancaster, Pennsylvania, United States, serving the Susquehanna Valley region as an affiliate of the Spanish-language network Univision. It is owned by Sinclair Broadcast Group alongside Harrisburg-licensed CBS/MyNetworkTV/CW affiliate WHP-TV (channel 21). The two stations share studios on North 6th Street in the Uptown section of Harrisburg; through a channel sharing agreement, the stations transmit using WHP-TV's spectrum from an antenna on a ridge north of Linglestown Road in Middle Paxton Township.

== History ==
=== Early history ===
The station first signed on the air on October 25, 1953, as WLBR-TV, operating as an independent station. Originally licensed to Lebanon, it transmitted its signal at one kilowatt on a 572-foot (174 m) tower located just north of Mount Gretna. The station was originally owned by the Lebanon Television Corporation, a joint venture of the Lebanon Broadcasting Company (owner of WLBR radio [1270 AM] and WQFM [100.1 FM, now WFVY]) and the Lebanon News Publishing Company (owner of the Lebanon Daily News). On October 16, 1954, the station went off the air after Hurricane Hazel knocked out the power to its transmitter, although they had already filed to go dark on that date with the Federal Communications Commission (FCC).

In 1955, Triangle Publications bought the channel 15 license from Lebanon Television, but the sale was held up by challenges from nearby Harrisburg television stations WHP-TV, WCMB-TV (now defunct), WTPA-TV (now WHTM-TV), and Reading television station WHUM-TV (also now defunct). The station finally returned to the air with increased power on May 2, 1957. Under Triangle ownership, the station became a part-time ABC affiliate and received other programs from then sister station WFIL-TV (now ABC owned-and-operated station WPVI-TV) in Philadelphia. Triangle changed the station's call letters on New Year's Day 1959 to WLYH-TV (representing its service area of Lebanon, York and Harrisburg). In 1963, it became a CBS affiliate as part of the Keystone Network, a three-station network serving South Central Pennsylvania that also included WHP-TV (channel 21) in Harrisburg, and WSBA-TV (channel 43, now WPMT-TV) in York. This arrangement was necessary in the days before cable television gained much penetration. South Central Pennsylvania had just been collapsed into one large and mountainous market earlier in the year. UHF stations have never covered large areas or rugged terrain very well. The Keystone Network created a strong combined signal with 55 percent overlap.

Originally, the three stations aired the same programming, though they were separately owned. Later in the 1960s, WHP-TV began airing separate programming outside of network hours, while WLYH and WSBA-TV continued simulcasting for most of the day. All three outlets ran prime time programming, most of the daytime shows, and most of the weekend offerings from CBS. All three stations preempted moderate amounts of CBS programming. However, through a longstanding agreement, any shows that WSBA-TV and WLYH preempted aired on WHP-TV and vice versa. This allowed most of the market to view the entire CBS schedule.

Triangle was forced out of broadcasting in 1970 after then-Governor Milton J. Shapp claimed the company had used its three Pennsylvania television stations (WLYH, WFIL-TV, and WFBG-TV in Altoona) in a smear campaign against him. WLYH was among the last to be sold, going to Gateway Communications as part of a group deal with WFBG-TV (now WTAJ-TV) and WNBF-TV (now WBNG-TV) in Binghamton, New York, in 1972.

In the 1980s, Gateway moved the station's city of license to Lancaster. Channel 43 left the Keystone Network in 1983 to become an independent station under new calls, WPMT. WLYH and WHP-TV continued as CBS affiliates, airing separate non-network programming and maintaining their longstanding agreement calling for programs preempted on one station to air on the other. By this time, the two stations had about 75 percent signal overlap.

Even though cable had gained significant penetration in the region by the mid-1980s, WLYH remained a CBS affiliate rather than become an independent. This was mainly because at the time, South Central Pennsylvania was just barely large enough to support what would have essentially been two independent stations. Even after WPMT joined Fox in 1986, it was still mostly programmed as an independent (as was the case with most Fox stations until 1993). Even without this to consider, Philadelphia's WPHL-TV and WTAF-TV (now Fox O&O WTXF-TV), had been available on cable for years. These two factors made Gateway balk at the added cost of buying an additional 16 hours of programming per day.

=== As a UPN affiliate (1995–2006) ===
The unusual situation of two separately-owned and programmed Big Three affiliates in one market that aired most of the same network programming would continue until 1995. On November 1, Clear Channel Communications (which had just bought WHP-TV) entered into a 20-year local marketing agreement with Gateway. Under this agreement, WHP-TV took control of WLYH's operations, with the combined operation housed at WHP-TV's studios in Harrisburg. Layoffs also hit WLYH following the LMA deal.

Upon signing the deal with Clear Channel, it became clear that WLYH's CBS affiliation was in danger. After considering affiliations with either The WB or UPN, Clear Channel converted WLYH into an exclusive UPN affiliate on December 16, 1995, thus making WHP-TV the sole CBS affiliate for South Central Pennsylvania. In 2000, Gateway sold all of its stations to SJL Broadcasting.

=== As a CW affiliate and licensee sale to Nexstar/LMA sale to Newport (2006–2012) ===
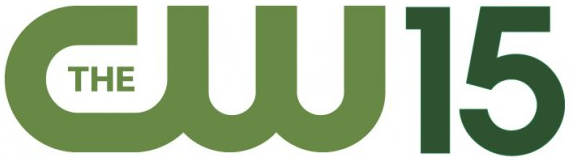
Previous CW 15 logo used from 2006 to 2015.

On January 24, 2006, the Warner Bros. unit of Time Warner and CBS Corporation announced that the two companies would shut down The WB and UPN and combine the networks' respective programming to create a new "fifth" network called The CW. On May 18, it was announced that WLYH would become the area's CW affiliate when it launched on September 18. Meanwhile, WHP created a new second digital subchannel to air programming from another new network, MyNetworkTV. Nexstar Broadcasting Group purchased WLYH and WTAJ from SJL in late 2006.

On April 20, 2007, Clear Channel entered into an agreement to sell its entire television station group (including WHP and the LMA with WLYH) to the private equity firm Providence Equity Partners. Providence then formed Newport Television as a holding company for the former Clear Channel stations.

=== Sale to Sinclair Broadcast Group/Howard Stirk Holdings era (2012–present) ===
Logo used from 2016 to 2024

On July 19, 2012, Newport announced the sale of WLYH's LMA partner, WHP-TV, to the Sinclair Broadcast Group. The LMA with WLYH was included in the deal, and Sinclair also obtained an option to purchase the station's license from Nexstar. This purchase option would later be terminated on March 20, 2014, as part of a restructuring of Sinclair's purchase of the broadcast holdings of Allbritton Communications, including ABC affiliate WHTM-TV, to address ownership conflicts between the three stations. Under the original deal, Sinclair would have retained the higher-rated WHTM and traded the license assets of WHP-TV to Deerfield Media, though Sinclair would have retained control of WHP-TV under shared services and joint sales agreements. The license assets of WLYH would have been reassigned to Howard Stirk Holdings, a holding company controlled by Graham Williams Group CEO and conservative political commentator Armstrong Williams, should the option be exercised. However, the FCC ruled that this would have effectively created a new LMA between WHTM and WLYH even though the FCC had ruled in 1999 that such agreements made after November 5, 1996, covering more than 15% of the broadcast day would count toward the ownership limits for the brokering station's owner. Under the restructured agreement, Sinclair announced that it would terminate the sale of WHP-TV to Deerfield and instead sell it to another third-party buyer, with whom Sinclair would not enter into any operational or financial agreements and would be given the rights to the LMA with WLYH. Sinclair ultimately retained WHP and the WLYH LMA and sold WHTM to Media General. Sinclair closed on the Newport group deal on December 3, 2012. Howard Stirk Holdings revealed in its January 2015 application to purchase Las Vegas station KVMY that it again planned to acquire the WLYH license from Nexstar. The sale was completed on November 12, 2015. The time brokerage agreement between WLYH and WHP-TV expired on December 31, 2015; Nexstar had, on December 11, 2014, elected to not renew the agreement. To reflect its new ownership, the station changed its callsign to WXBU on March 11, 2016. The call letters correspond to the initials of Xavier B. Underwood, a member of the Williams family who also acts as creative director for Howard Stirk Holdings.

In May 2024, WXBU became a Univision affiliate.

On August 12, 2025, Sinclair announced that it would acquire WXBU outright, creating a legal duopoly with WHP-TV. The sale was completed on June 1, 2026.

== News operation ==
WLYH established a full news operation in the early 1960s that focused on the eastern portion (including Lebanon and Lancaster) of its large viewing area. Since it has broadcast over a UHF signal during the analog era, the station's coverage area was limited due to the nature of such signals. UHF signals usually do not enjoy as much of a broadcasting radius in mountainous areas as stations operating on VHF do. During the 1960s, WLYH operated a bureau in the W. W. Griest Building in Downtown Lancaster, in addition to its main studios in South Londonderry Township.

In the early-1970s, an entirely new base of operations for color television and updated news film processing were constructed as part of the new Park City Center in that city. WSBA simulcast WLYH's newscasts until the arrangement ended in 1983 with the former severing ties after becoming WPMT. In June 1991, the station discontinued its 11 p.m. newscast in favor of airing first-run syndicated programming in the timeslot; this left the existing half-hour 6 p.m. edition of Action News as the only newscast that channel 15 offered for the remainder of the news department's existence.

After WHP took over operations of WLYH in November 1995, the former shut down WLYH's separate news department, resulting in the loss of two core anchors. The following year, in September 1996, a news share agreement was established between WLYH and WHP, resulting in WHP producing a prime time newscast at 10 p.m. for channel 15. The effort competed with WPMT, which also aired a prime time news broadcast in the 10 p.m. timeslot since that station (which, by then, had become a Fox affiliate) launched its current news department in September 1994. Due to low ratings and inconsistent viewership, the 10 p.m. newscast on WLYH was canceled in 2003.

In January 2009, WHP launched a prime time newscast on this station for a second time. This incarnation of WLYH's newscast initially only aired on weeknights before expanding to a seven-night-a-week broadcast at some point in time. Like the previous effort, the WHP-produced half-hour 10 p.m. newscast competes with WPMT's longer-established hour-long prime time newscast. In addition to its main studios in Harrisburg, WHP also operates bureaus in Lancaster and York.

== Technical information ==
=== Subchannels ===
Subchannels of WHP-TV and WXBU
License	Subchannel	Res.	Short name	Programming
WHP-TV	21.1	1080i	CBS	CBS
WHP-TV	21.2	480i	MyTV	Independent with MyNetworkTV
WHP-TV	21.3	720p	CW	The CW
WHP-TV	21.4	480i	Charge!	Charge!
WXBU	15.1	480i	Univis	Univision

WXBU (as WLYH-TV; then owned by Nexstar) previously carried TheCoolTV on 15.2. WLYH dropped that network in favor of the Live Well Network on August 1, 2012. It also dropped the Live Well Network on 15.2 in late December 2014 and replaced it with Grit TV.

On February 1, 2016, after Howard Stirk Holdings took control of the station, the simulcast of "The CW Central PA" (which moved to sister station WHP 21.3) ended, and Grit moved up from 15.2 to 15.1, with Comet also moving up from 15.3 to 15.2. 15.3 went dark. With the spectrum auction, Comet was moved to 15.1, replacing Grit. 15.2 and 15.3 remained dark.

=== Analog-to-digital conversion ===
WXBU-TV discontinued regular programming on its analog signal, over UHF channel 15, on February 17, 2009, to conclude the federally mandated transition from analog to digital television. The station's digital signal remained on its pre-transition UHF channel 23, using virtual channel 15.

In December 2015, sister station WHP-TV added a second subchannel on 21.3, which duplicated the WLYH CW main 15.1 channel and was created in order to become the new home of the WLYH CW15 programming. In addition, the station changed its on-air branding from The CW15, to The CW Central PA on January 1, 2016. On February 1, 2016, The CW Central PA on 15.1 was discontinued, with the subchannels each moving up one spot.

WXBU sold its spectrum for $108 million in the 2016–2017 FCC incentive auction and the station will have to cease broadcasting on its current digital channel 90 days after it receives payment from the FCC. The station entered a channel-sharing agreement with Sinclair-owned CBS affiliate WHP-TV.
