= Seventeen (American magazine) =

American magazine for teenagers

Seventeen Magazine
- Demi Lovato on the cover of the August 2014 issue
- Editor: Willa Bennett
- Categories: Teen magazine
- Frequency: Bimonthly
- Publisher: Hearst Magazines (from 2003)
- Total circulation: 2,020,492 (2017)
- First issue: September 1944
- Country: United States
- Based in: New York City
- Language: English
- Website: www.seventeen.com
- ISSN: 0037-301X

Seventeen is an American bimonthly fashion magazine headquartered in New York City and owned by Hearst Magazines. The publication targets a demographic of 10-to-25-year-old women and girls. Established in 1944, the magazine originally aimed to inspire teenage girls to become model workers and citizens. However, it soon shifted its focus to a more fashion- and romance-oriented approach while still emphasizing the importance of self-confidence in young men and women. Alongside its primary themes, Seventeen also reports the latest news about celebrities.

== History ==
Seventeen was founded by publisher Walter Annenberg, owner of Triangle Publications, based upon a suggestion by editor Helen Valentine. Working from New York, she provided teenaged girls with working-woman role models and information about their personality development and overall growth. Seventeen enhanced the role of teenagers as consumers of popular culture. The concept of "teenager" as a distinct demographic originated in that era. In July 1944, King Features Syndicate began running the comic strip Teena, created by cartoonist Hilda Terry, in which a typical teenager's life was examined. Teena ran internationally in newspapers for 20 years.

After Seventeen was launched in New York City in September 1944, Estelle Ellis Rubenstein, the magazine's promotion director, introduced advertisers to the life of teenaged girls through Teena, selling advertising in Seventeen at the same time. From 1945 to 1946, the magazine surveyed teen girls to better understand the magazine's audience. The magazine became an important source of information to manufacturers seeking guidance on how to satisfy consumer demand among teenagers. Today, the magazine entertains and promotes self-confidence in young women.

The magazine was named after the Booth Tarkington novel of same name.

Sylvia Plath submitted nearly 50 pieces to Seventeen before her first short story, "And Summer Will Not Come Again", was accepted and published in the August 1950 issue.

Joyce Walker became the first black model to be featured on the cover of Seventeen in July 1971. In 1981, Whitney Houston was also featured on the cover of the magazine.

New York City-based News Corporation bought Triangle in 1988 and sold Seventeen to K-III Communications (now Rent Group) in 1991. In 1999 Linda Platzner was named Publisher and then President of the Seventeen magazine group. Primedia sold the magazine to New York City-based Hearst in a process led by Platzner in 2003.

In 2010, writer Jamie Keiles conducted "The Seventeen Magazine Project", an experiment in which she followed the advice of Seventeen magazine for 30 days. In 2012, in response to reader protests against the magazine's airbrushing its models' photos, Seventeen ended its practice of using digital photo manipulation to enhance published photographs.

In August 2016, Michelle Tan was fired from her position as editor-in-chief while she was on maternity leave. It was announced shortly thereafter that Michele Promaulayko, who was appointed editor in chief of Cosmopolitan, would also serve as Seventeen's editorial director. Starting with their Dec/Jan 2017 issue, the magazine was to start publishing only six issues a year instead of ten, in order to focus on their online presence to appeal to the Generation Z market. In October 2018, it was announced that Jessica Pels would take over from Promaulayko as Editor-in-chief of Cosmopolitan, and that Kristin Koch was appointed Seventeen's new executive director, overseeing all its content. In November 2018, it was announced that Seventeen's print editions would be reduced to special stand-alone issues.

== International editions ==
- The South African edition of Seventeen magazine was published by 8 Ink Media based in Cape Town. The editor was Janine Jellars. The magazine ceased publication in 2013.
- The Philippine version was published by Summit Media, but it ceased publication in April 2009.
- The Mexican edition was published by Editorial Televisa, but it ceased publication due to the COVID-19 pandemic in June 2020.
- The Indian edition is published by Apricot Publications Pvt. Ltd in Mumbai.
- The Malaysian version of Seventeen is published by Bluinc.
- Seventeen Singapore is published by SPH Magazines.
- The Thai edition of Seventeen is published by Media Transasia Limited in Bangkok.
- The Japanese version of Seventeen is published by Shueisha Publishing Co., Ltd.
- The Indonesian edition of Seventeen was published by Femina Group; it ceased publication in September 2009.

== In other media ==
Seventeen has also published books for teens, addressing such topics as beauty, style, college, and health and fitness.

=== America's Next Top Model ===
Seventeen was a sponsor of America's Next Top Model. The winners of America's Next Top Model from seasons seven through 14 have each appeared on a cover of Seventeen magazine, including CariDee English, Jaslene Gonzalez, Sal Stowers, Whitney Thompson, McKey Sullivan, Teyona Anderson, Nicole Fox, and Krista White. Originally, the magazine only planned on sponsoring the show from cycles seven through 10; however, with such a high success rate and a great opportunity the magazine provided for these women, it sponsored the cycles until the show decided to move the winners to Vogue Italia.

=== Cyberbu//y ===
In 2011, Seventeen worked with ABC Family to make a film about a girl who gets bullied online called Cyberbu//y. The point was to raise awareness of cyber bullying and to "delete digital drama". The film premiered July 17, 2011, on ABC Family.

=== Petition on image manipulation ===
In April 2012, 14-year-old Julia Bluhm from Waterville, Maine, created a petition on Change.org titled "Seventeen Magazine: Give Girls Images of Real Girls!' advocating for the magazine publication to vow to print at least one unaltered and Photoshop-FREE monthly photo spread". As a self-proclaimed "SPARK Summit Activist", Bluhm petitioned for an end to digital photo manipulation.

In May 2012 Bluhm, her mother, and a group of fellow "SPARK Summit" members were invited to the New York headquarters of Seventeen by editor-in-chief Ann Shoket.

On 3 July 2012, Bluhm announced that her petition had "won" after receiving almost 85,000 signatures online, resulting in Seventeen's editorial staff pledging to always feature one photo spread per month without the use of digital photo manipulation. Furthermore, Seventeen's editor-in-chief Shoket published an editorial praising The Body Peace Treaty in the August 2012 Seventeen issue, offering the push against digital photo manipulation as an extension of the magazine's ongoing Body Peace Project.

=== Project Runway: Threads and Project Runway: Junior ===
Seventeen was a sponsor of Project Runway: Threads, now a sponsor of Project Runway: Junior. The winners of Project Runway: Junior from seasons one and two have had their designs feature in a fashion spread of Seventeen, including Maya and Chelsea.

== Editors ==
- Helen Valentine (1944–1953)
- Enid A. Haupt (1953–1970)
- Midge Richardson (1975–1993)
- Maci Hunter (1993–1994)
- Caroline Miller (1994–1997)
- Meredith Berlin (1997–1999)
- Patrice G. Adcroft
- Mia Fausto-Cruz
- Simon Dumenco
- Sabrina Weill
- Annemarie Iverson (2000–2001)
- Atoosa Rubenstein (2003–2007)
- Ann Shoket (2007–2014)
- Michelle Tan (2014–2016)
- Michele Promaulayko (2016–October 2018)
- Kristin Koch (October 2018– August 2024)
- Willa Bennett (September 2024–Present)

== Changes in United States cover price ==
Year	Price (US$)	Inflation adjusted price
1944	0.15	2.12
1948	0.25	2.60
1949	0.30	3.12
1953	0.35	3.27
1958	0.40	3.33
1961	0.50	4.01
1974	0.65	3.21
1974	0.75	3.70
1977	1	4.03
1981	1.25	3.64
1983	1.50	3.96
1988	1.75	3.99
1990	1.95	4.13
1993	2.25	4.40
1995	2.50	4.69
2005	2.99	4.60
2012	3.99	5.37

== Logos ==
From September 1944, there are four different logos for this magazine. The first and current logo was in use from September 1944 to June 1977, and has been in the use again from January 2004, the second logo was in use from June 1977 to August 1992, the third logo was in use from August 1992 to February 2002, and the fourth logo was in use from February 2002 to January 2004.

== See also ==
- 16 (magazine)
- List of teen magazines
