= WFBG =

Radio station in Altoona, Pennsylvania

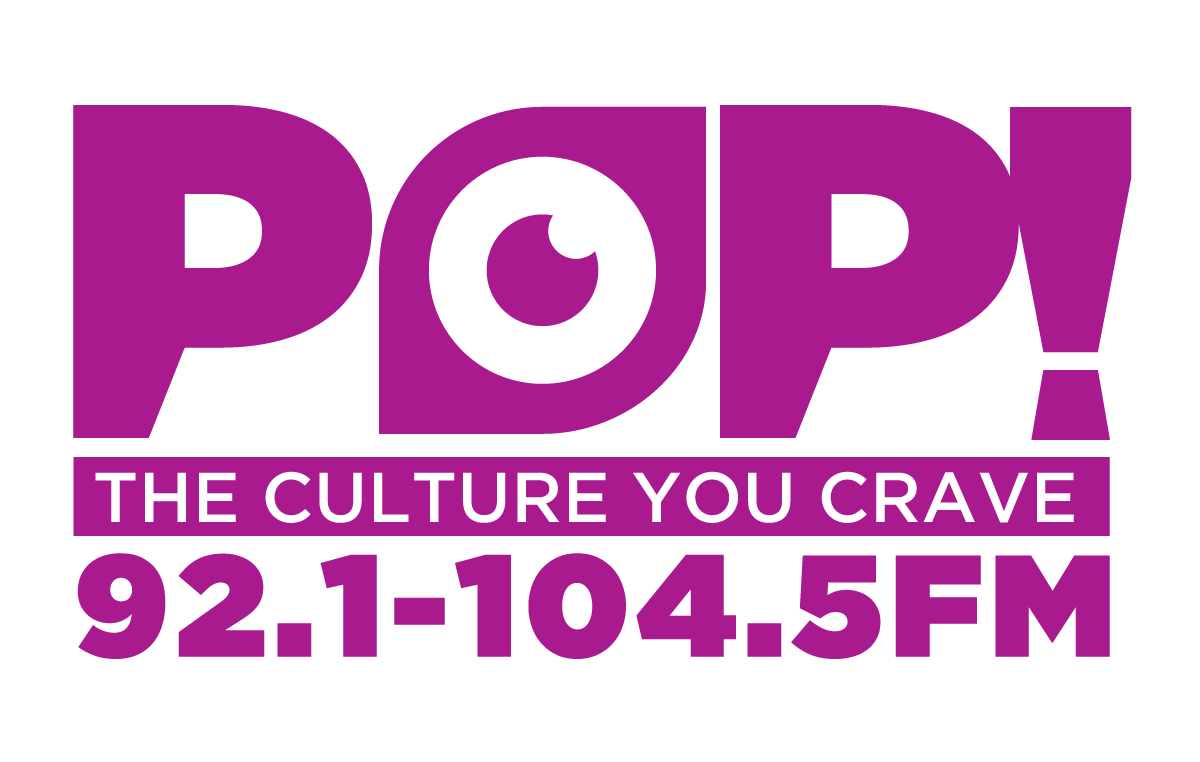
- Altoona, Pennsylvania; United States
- Broadcast area: Altoona metropolitan area
- Frequency: 1290 kHz
- Branding: Pop! Radio 92.1 and 104.5

Programming
- Language: English
- Format: Contemporary hit radio
- Affiliations: Compass Media Networks; Penn State Nittany Lions; Premiere Networks

Ownership
- Owner: Seven Mountains Media; (Southern Belle Media Family, LLC)
- Sister stations: WALY; WFGY; WQWY; WRKY-FM; WTNA

History
- First air date: October 30, 1924
- Call sign meaning: Randomly assigned from sequential list.

Technical information
- Licensing authority: FCC
- Facility ID: 38269
- Class: B
- Power: 5,000 watts (day); 1,000 watts (night)
- Transmitter coordinates: 40°27′20.00″N 78°23′50.00″W
- Translator: 104.5 W283DI (Altoona)
- Repeater: 92.1 WJHT (Johnstown)

Links
- Public license information: Public file; LMS
- Webcast: Listen live
- Website: mypopradio.com

WFBG (1290 kHz) is an AM radio station broadcasting a contemporary hit radio format in Altoona, Pennsylvania, United States. Owned by Seven Mountains Media, it transmits with 5,000 watts during the day, and 1,000 watts at night. WFBG's programming is also heard on 92.1 WJHT in Johnstown.

== History ==
WFBG was first licensed on July 23, 1924, to the William F. Gable Co., owner of Gable's department store on 11th Avenue in Altoona, for 100 watts on 1150 kHz. The call letters were randomly assigned from a sequential list.

Later that year the station moved to 1080 kHz, and as of the end of 1926 was reported to be on 1070 kHz.

Following the establishment of the Federal Radio Commission (FRC), stations were initially issued a series of temporary authorizations starting on May 3, 1927, which moved the station back to 1080 kHz, which later that year was changed to 1120 kHz. In addition, stations were informed that if they wanted to continue operating, they needed to file a formal license application by January 15, 1928, as the first step in determining whether they met the new "public interest, convenience, or necessity" standard.

On May 25, 1928, the FRC issued General Order 32, which notified 164 stations, including WFBG, that "From an examination of your application for future license it does not find that public interest, convenience, or necessity would be served by granting it." However, the station successfully convinced the commission that it should remain licensed.

On November 11, 1928, the FRC made a major reallocation of station transmitting frequencies, as part of a reorganization resulting from its implementation of its General Order 40. WFBG was assigned to 1310 kHz, sharing the frequency with station WHBP in Johnstown. In 1939, WFBG was authorized to start operating for unlimited hours, after its former timeshare partner, now WJAC, moved to 1370 kHz. On March 29, 1941, a second major reallocation, part of the implementation of the North American Regional Broadcasting Agreement, resulted in most stations on 1310 kHz, including WFBG, moving to 1340 kHz. In 1962, the station moved to 1290 kHz.

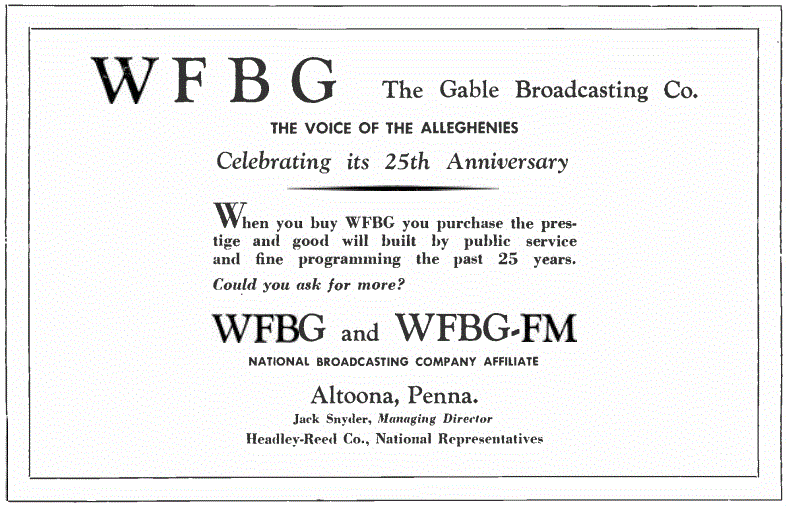
In 1949, WFBG celebrated its 25th anniversary as "The Voice of the Alleghenies".

WFBG was known as "The Voice of the Alleghenies". It was a very influential and top-rated station, the biggest station between Philadelphia and Pittsburgh. From the 1960s until 1989, the station had a Top 40 (later CHR) format. During its early Top 40 days in the 1960s, the Morning Mayor, as he was called, was Big John Riley, working from 6 a.m. to 10 a.m. Dick Richards followed from 10 a.m. to 3 p.m. Dan Resh did the 3 p.m. to 7 p.m. shift and Dick DiAndrea owned the night from 7 p.m. to midnight. DiAndrea also hosted a very popular Bandstand program on dual CBS/ABC (now primary CBS) station WFBG-TV (now WTAJ-TV). Weekends on the radio were handled by Bill Bukowski (8 a.m. to 4 p.m.) and Bob Witten (4p to midnight). The news team included Del Smith, Charles Ritchey, and Bob Witten. The station was purchased by Triangle Publications under Walter Annenberg in Philadelphia. General Manager was John Stilli, Program Director; Jim VanDeVelde; News Director, Lantz Hoffman. It was grouped with WFBG-FM and its television station WFBG-TV. Both stations were located on 6th Avenue in Altoona, Pennsylvania. In 1989, the station's format was morphed into hot adult contemporary, and lasted into the 1990s.

Former logo

On October 12, 2022, Forever Media announced it would sell thirty-four stations and twelve translators, including WFBG and the entire Altoona station cluster, to State College-based Seven Mountains Media for $17.3 million. The deal closed on January 1, 2023.

On March 21, 2023, at 4:30 p.m., WFBG dropped its news/talk format and stunting with a loop of "Pop" by NSYNC, while promoting a change to come March 24 at 10 a.m.; at that time, WFBG assumed WWOT's Top 40/CHR format as "Pop! 104.5 FM". The first song on "Pop" was I'm Good (Blue) by David Guetta and Bebe Rexha.
