= WFGY =

Radio station in Altoona, Pennsylvania

- Altoona, Pennsylvania; United States
- Broadcast area: Altoona metropolitan area
- Frequency: 98.1 MHz
- Branding: Froggy 98.1

Programming
- Language: English
- Format: Country music
- Affiliations: Compass Media Networks; Premiere Networks; Performance Racing Network; Westwood One

Ownership
- Owner: Seven Mountains Media; (Southern Belle Media Family, LLC)
- Sister stations: WALY; WFBG; WQWY; WRKY-FM; WTNA

History
- First air date: October 17, 1960
- Former call signs: WFBG-FM (1960–1991)
- Call sign meaning: "Froggy"

Technical information
- Licensing authority: FCC
- Facility ID: 38265
- Class: B
- ERP: 30,000 watts
- HAAT: 287 meters (942 ft)
- Transmitter coordinates: 40°34′1.2″N 78°26′31.0″W

Links
- Public license information: Public file; LMS
- Webcast: Listen live
- Website: froggy98radio.com

WFGY (98.1 MHz, "Froggy 98.1") is a commercial FM radio station in Altoona, Pennsylvania, United States. The station is owned by Seven Mountains Media, through licensee Southern Belle Media Family, LLC, and broadcasts a Froggy-branded country music radio format.

WFGY is the flagship station of the Froggy Radio network of stations in the region, which also includes WFGI-FM (Froggy 95.5 on 95.5 MHz), licensed to serve Johnstown, Pennsylvania, and WFGE (Big Froggy 101.1 on 101.1 MHz), licensed to serve State College, Pennsylvania.

WFGY is a grandfathered "superpower" station. While the station’s effective radiated power (ERP) is within the maximum limit allowed for a Class B FM station, its antenna height above average terrain (HAAT) is too high for its ERP according to current FCC rules.

== History ==
=== Beginnings as WFBG-FM ===
The Federal Communications Commission granted Triangle Publications, Inc. a construction permit for the station on April 8, 1959, with the WFBG-FM call sign. The station signed on October 17, 1960, and was granted its first license on March 26, 1962.

On September 20, 1972, the FCC granted a voluntary reassignment of the station's license to The Gilcom Corporation.

The station was best known for being Blair County's exclusive easy listening station, primarily automated, like others of its day. However, change would come by the start of the 1990s.

=== Switchover to Froggy ===
On April 2, 1991, the station's call sign was changed to WFGY. Forever of PA, LLC (Forever Media) purchased the station on July 31, 1996, with the sale consummating on August 31, 1996. The station adopted the "Froggy 98" branding while changing format to country music. The station became known for its colorful presentation, with jingles resembling a frog's croak (or, as they proclaimed, "ribbit"), as well as the even more colorful names assigned to its on-air staff. The station also promoted a family-friendly image and did station giveaways catering to families.

Former logo

Among the on-air names used at Froggy by the DJs over the years were Roger Ribbit, Web Foote, Holly Hopper, Jeff Jumper, Davey Croak-it, Cricket, Tad Pole, Pete Moss, Polly Wogg, Kellie Green, Steve "The Frogman" Kelsey, Jumpin' Jim, and James Pond. The current morning show is Jojo and Lily. It is also simulcast on sister station WFGE State College (Big Froggy 101). It has a large listening audience and has been on the air for over a decade.

=== Sale to Seven Mountains Media ===
It was announced on October 12, 2022, that Forever Media was selling 34 stations, including WFGY and the entire Altoona cluster, to State College-based Seven Mountains Media for $17.3 million. The deal closed on January 1, 2023.
