= Central Trust Building =

Central Trust Building may refer to:

- Central Trust Building, the former name of the Fourth and Vine Tower, in Cincinnati
- Central Trust Company Buildings, Pennsylvania
