= WWBJ =

WWBJ may refer to:

- WWBJ-LP, a low-power radio station (92.1 FM) licensed to serve Hillsboro, Ohio, United States
- WJSM (AM), a radio station (1110 AM) licensed to serve Martinsburg, Pennsylvania, United States, which held the call sign WWBJ from 2009 to 2015
