= Mishler Theatre =

Historic theatre in Altoona, Pennsylvania

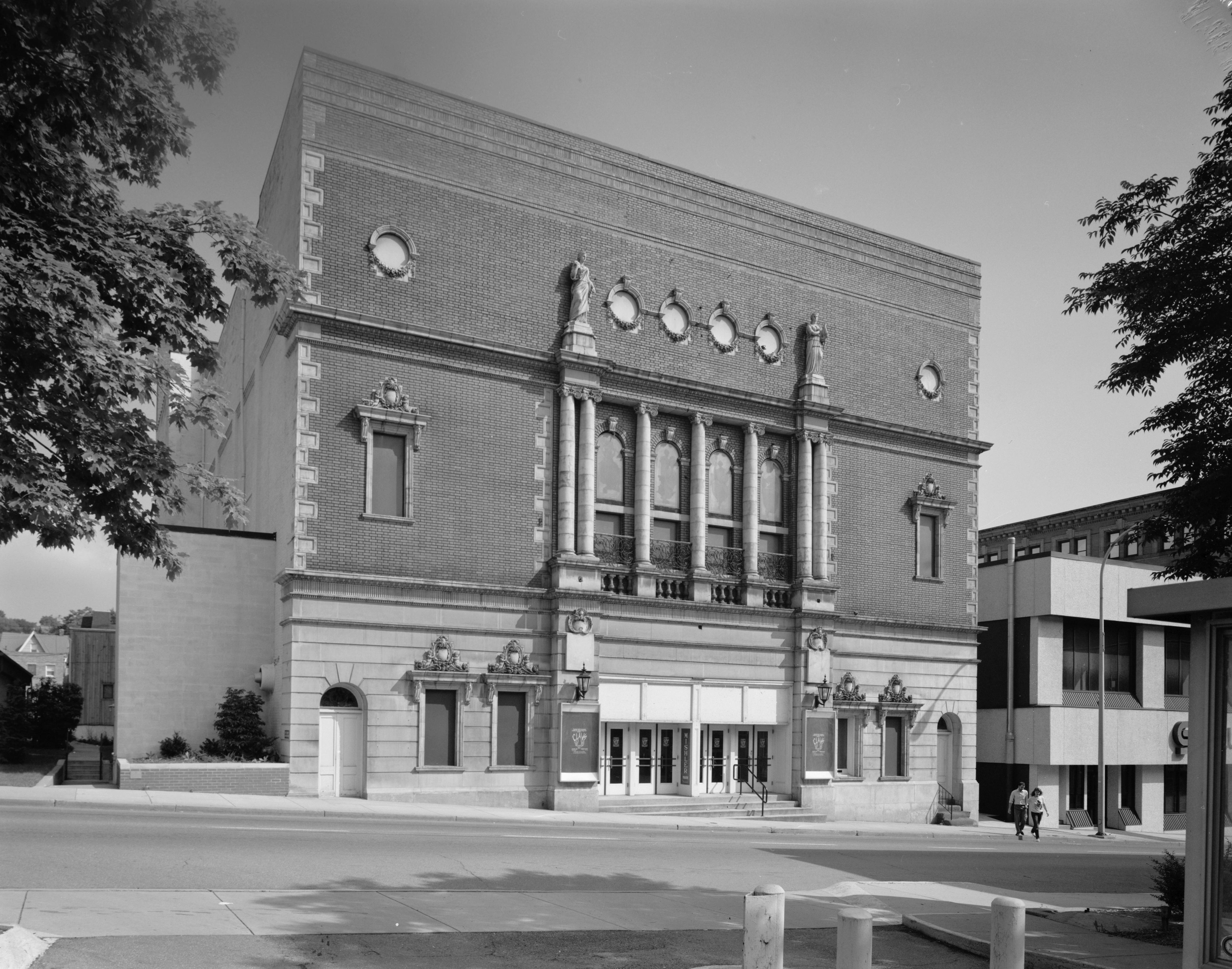
- Front of the theater
- Interactive map of Mishler Theatre
- Address: 1208 12th Avenue; Altoona, Pennsylvania; United States
- Owner: Blair County Arts Foundation
- Designation: National Register of Historic Places

Construction
- Opened: February 15, 1906
- Rebuilt: 1907
- Years active: 1906 – present

Website
- http://mishlertheatre.org/
- Mishler Theatre
- U.S. National Register of Historic Places
- Location within Pennsylvania Location within the United States
- Location: 1208 12th Ave., Altoona, Pennsylvania
- Coordinates: 40°30′59″N 78°24′07″W
- Area: less than one acre
- Built: 1906
- Architect: Albert E. Westover
- Architectural style: Beaux Arts
- NRHP reference No.: 73001592
- Added to NRHP: April 11, 1973

The Mishler Theatre is a Beaux-Arts stage and movie theater located at 1208 Twelfth Avenue in Altoona, Pennsylvania.

== History ==
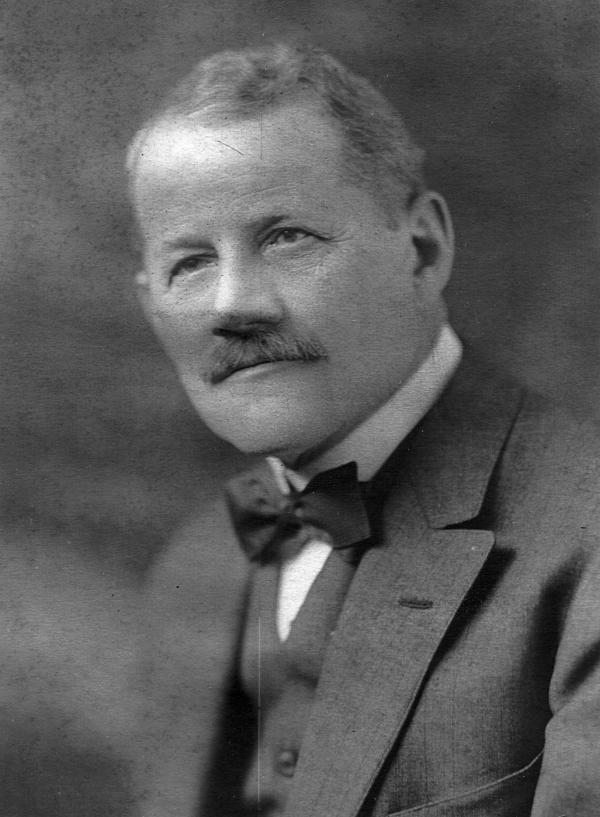
Isaac Charles Mishler, circa 1906

It was designed by Albert E. Westover and built by local theatre owner and manager Isaac Charles Mishler and opened on February 15, 1906. Nine months later, the neighboring Rothert building caught fire, which quickly spread to the theater, destroying the interior. The theater was rebuilt and re-opened in 1907.

In 1924, Isaac Mishler announced his retirement and later sold the theatre in 1931.

After disuse in the mid-20th century, the theatre was considered for demolition in 1965. In response, the Altoona Community Theatre and the Blair County Arts Foundation purchased it and began renovations. When the theatre reopened in 1969, their inaugural performance was The Sound of Music.

It was added to the National Register of Historic Places in 1973, and is located in the Downtown Altoona Historic District.

== Restoration ==
Early renovations included replacement of the seats and the lobby's chandelier with the new one purchased in 1970 at a Metro-Goldwyn-Mayer auction. Major structural, plumbing, and electrical work began in the early 1990s. At the most recent estimate, the restoration has cost more than $1 million.
