= Central Trust Company Buildings =

- U.S. National Register of Historic Places
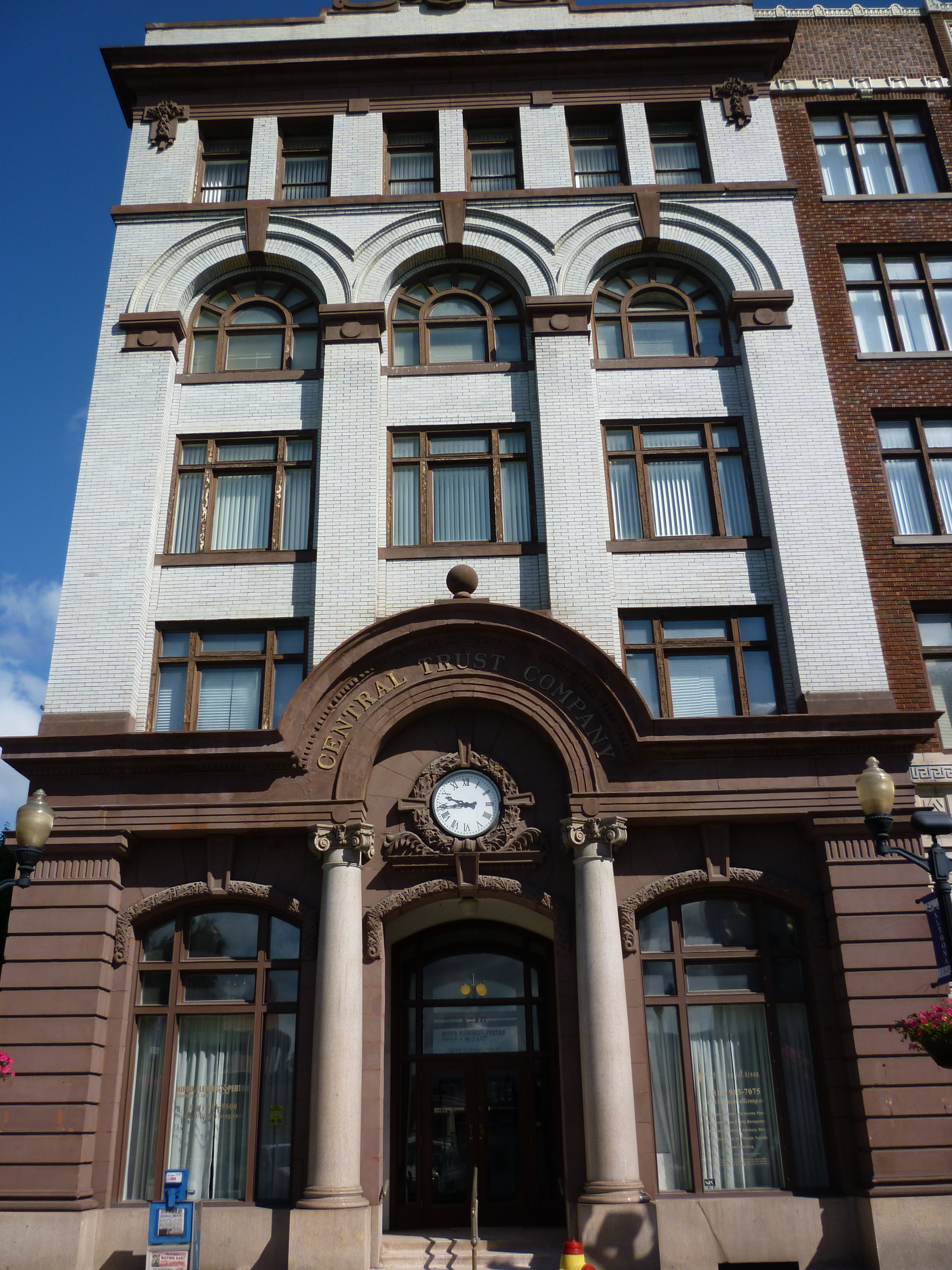
- Central Trust Company Building, 2009

- Location within Pennsylvania Location within the United States
- Location: 1210–1218 11th Ave., Altoona, Pennsylvania
- Coordinates: 40°30′54.72″N 78°24′5.97″W
- Area: 0.4 acres (0.16 ha)
- Built: 1905, 1922
- Architectural style: Beaux Arts, Romanesque
- NRHP reference No.: 84000271
- Added to NRHP: November 1, 1984

Central Trust Company Buildings are two historic commercial buildings located at Altoona, Blair County, Pennsylvania. They are two five-story buildings connected by a stair and elevator tower. The buildings measure 130 by 120 feet (40 by 37 m). The Central Trust Company Building was built in 1905 and is a white glazed brick building with brownstone trim in the Beaux Arts style. The entry features two Ionic order engaged granite columns. The adjoining Brett Building was built between 1922 and 1924.

The buildings were added to the National Register of Historic Places in 1984 and are located in the Downtown Altoona Historic District.
