= Altoona Mirror =

Newspaper in Altoona, Pennsylvania

- Type: Daily newspaper
- Format: Broadsheet
- Owner(s): Ogden Newspapers
- Publisher: Dan Slep
- Editor: Neil Rudel
- Founded: 1874 (as The Evening Mirror)
- Language: English
- Headquarters: 301 Cayuga Avenue; Altoona, Pennsylvania 16602, U.S.
- Country: United States
- Circulation: 27,732
- Website: AltoonaMirror.com

The Altoona Mirror is a daily newspaper located in Altoona, Pennsylvania. It is the hometown newspaper for Altoona, all of Blair County, and parts of surrounding counties.

== History ==
The newspaper was founded on June 13, 1874, as The Evening Mirror by Harry E. Slep and George J. Akers (Slep & Akers Company). Akers left the company in 1877, leaving Slep as the sole owner. Mr. Slep's eldest son, William H. Slep, eventually joined the business and the firm became known as H. & W.H. Slep Company.

In 1888, the newspaper's name was changed to Altoona Mirror. In 1907, the Slep company name was changed to Mirror Printing Company. The paper remained in the Slep family until being sold in 1984 to Thomson Newspapers. Under Thomson ownership, a Sunday edition was launched in 1987 and the paper switched its weekday publication to mornings starting in 1997. The Altoona Mirror was sold in 1998 to current owner Ogden Newspapers.

Dan Slep, a fifth-generation descendant of co-founder Harry E. Slep, became publisher in 2021.

== Pennsylvania Mirror ==
A Mirror Printing Company sister newspaper, the Pennsylvania Mirror, was published between 1968 and 1977, and covered news and events in neighboring Centre County. As a morning paper, it offered an alternative to the State College, Pennsylvania-based Centre Daily Times which was an evening paper.
