= WBRX =

- Cresson, Pennsylvania; United States
- Broadcast area: Altoona, Pennsylvania
- Frequency: 94.7 MHz
- Branding: Mix 94.7

Programming
- Format: Adult contemporary

Ownership
- Owner: Matthew W. Lightner; (Lightner Communications LLC)
- Sister stations: WBXQ, WRTA, WKMC, WTRN, WYUP

History
- First air date: November 1981 (as WRKE)
- Former call signs: WRKE (1981–1982); WBXQ (1982–2007)
- Former frequencies: 94.3 MHz (now WBXQ)

Technical information
- Licensing authority: FCC
- Facility ID: 60909
- Class: A
- ERP: 970 watts
- HAAT: 242 meters
- Transmitter coordinates: 40°24′11.00″N 78°31′35.00″W

Links
- Public license information: Public file; LMS
- Webcast: Listen Live
- Website: mymix947.com

WBRX (94.7 FM, "Mix 94.7") is a radio station broadcasting an adult contemporary format. Licensed to the suburb of Cresson, Pennsylvania, it serves the Altoona, Pennsylvania metropolitan area. It first began broadcasting in 1981 under the call sign WRKE. The station is currently owned by Matt Lightner, through licensee Lightner Communications LLC.

== History ==
=== History ===
The history of 94.3 and 94.7 in the area is intertwined.

94.3 first signed on the air in November 1981 as WRKE, founded by legendary Pittsburgh broadcaster Ed Sherlock and his business partner Neil Hart, who formed Sherlock-Hart Broadcasting the year before. The station broadcast a Top 40/CHR music format, and was consulted by Pittsburgh program director and air personality Clarke Ingram, who at the time was at 96KX (now WKST-FM). On March 19, 1982, the call sign was changed from WRKE to WBXQ, and used the moniker Q94 branding. In addition to owning WBXQ, Sherlock and Hart owned then-oldies-lean AC station WAMQ (now WYUP) in Loretto.

In 1990, Sherlock and Hart dissolved their partnership, with Hart leaving to pursue other interests. WAMQ, which was falling into some financial difficulty, was sold to WBXQ Operations Manager Tom Stevens for $55,000 in July 1992. Sherlock retained possession of WBXQ.

94.7 was first assigned the call sign "WKBE" on October 31, 1988. On June 16, 1989, the call sign was changed to WHUM-FM and then changed again to WBRX on December 15, 1989. For many years, WBRX simulcasted WBXQ.

=== WBRX ===
According to 100000watts.com, WBRX 94.3 and WBXQ 94.7 swapped calls, retaining their classic rock simulcast, on April 27, 2007. Fybush.com reports the call swap was apparently filed in error, as it disappeared the next day (the 28th) from the FCC database. On June 28, 2007, the WBRX and WBXQ call signs were officially swapped on 94.3 and 94.7 FM.

On October 22, 2007, WBRX split from the Q94 classic rock simulcast and switched to an adult contemporary format branded as "Mix 94.7".

On October 1, 2019, WBRX – along with WKMC, WRTA, WBXQ, and two translators – was sold to long-time broadcast engineer and business owner Matt Lightner under the company name of Lightner Communications LLC. Lightner first entered the Altoona, Pa area radio market in August 2017 with the purchase of WTRN.
