= WBXQ =

- Patton, Pennsylvania; United States
- Broadcast area: Altoona, Pennsylvania; Cresson, Pennsylvania
- Frequency: 94.3 MHz
- Branding: Q94

Programming
- Format: Classic rock
- Affiliations: Compass Media Networks; United Stations Radio Networks; Westwood One

Ownership
- Owner: Matthew W. Lightner; (Lightner Communications LLC)
- Sister stations: WBRX, WRTA, WKMC, WTRN, WYUP

History
- First air date: 1991 (as WBRX)
- Former call signs: WKBE (1988–1989, CP); WHUM-FM (6/1989–12/1989, CP); WBRX (1989–2007)
- Former frequencies: 94.7 MHz (now WBRX)

Technical information
- Licensing authority: FCC
- Facility ID: 33971
- Class: A
- ERP: 2,100 watts
- HAAT: 167 meters (548 ft)
- Transmitter coordinates: 40°34′06″N 78°26′24″W
- Repeater: 94.3 WBXQ-FM1 (Altoona)

Links
- Public license information: Public file; LMS
- Webcast: Listen Live
- Website: q94classicrock.com Facebook page

WBXQ (94.3 FM, "Q94") is a radio station broadcasting a classic rock format. Licensed to the suburb of Patton, Pennsylvania, it serves the Altoona, Pennsylvania metropolitan area. It first began broadcasting in 1988 under the call sign WKBE. The station is currently owned by Matt Lightner, through licensee Lightner Communications LLC. At one time, Q94 at 94.3 was Altoona's top 40 radio outlet.

== History ==
The history of 94.3 and 94.7 in the area is intertwined.

94.3 first signed on the air in November 1981 as WRKE, broadcasting a Top 40/CHR format, and was founded by legendary Pittsburgh broadcaster Ed Sherlock and his business partner Neil Hart, who formed Sherlock-Hart Broadcasting the year before. The station's licensee, however, was listed as Sounds Good, Inc. In addition to owning WBXQ, both men owned then-oldies-lean AC station WAMQ (now WYUP) in Loretto. The FM station was consulted by Pittsburgh program director and on-air personality Clarke Ingram, who at the time was at 96KX (now WKST-FM). On March 19, 1982, the call letters were changed to WBXQ, and the Q94 branding was introduced.

In 1990, Sherlock and Hart dissolved their partnership, with Hart leaving to pursue other interests. WAMQ, which was falling into some financial difficulty, was sold to WBXQ Operations Manager Tom Stevens in July 1992. Sherlock retained possession of WBXQ.

94.7 was first assigned the call sign WKBE on October 31, 1988. On June 16, 1989, the call sign was changed to WHUM-FM and then changed again to WBRX on December 15, 1989. For many years, WBRX simulcasted WBXQ.

According to 100000watts.com, WBRX 94.3 and WBXQ 94.7 swapped calls, retaining their classic rock simulcast, on April 27, 2007. Fybush.com reports the call swap was apparently filed in error, as it disappeared the next day (the 28th) from the FCC database. On June 28, 2007, the WBRX and WBXQ call signs were officially swapped on 94.3 and 94.7 FM.

Logo as True Country, 2009-2015

On October 22, 2007 WBRX split from the Q94 classic rock simulcast and switched to an adult contemporary format branded as "Mix 94.7".

On April 15, 2009 WBXQ changed their format to country, branded as "True Country 94.3".

On October 28, 2015 WBXQ brought Q94 and classic rock back to the area; the station goes up against WRKY-FM for Altoona rock listeners.

In July 2019, Lightner Communications LLC purchased both WBXQ and WBRX, along with WKMC, WRTA, and two translators, from current owner Rebecca Barger. Matt Lightner is a long time Broadcast Engineer and area business owner. The sale was consummated on October 1, 2019, at a price of $675,000.

The station is an affiliate of the weekly syndicated Pink Floyd program "Floydian Slip."
