= WYUP =

- Loretto, Pennsylvania; United States
- Broadcast area: Altoona, Pennsylvania
- Frequency: 1400 kHz
- Branding: 101.3 107.1 Jack FM

Programming
- Format: Adult hits
- Affiliations: Jack FM network

Ownership
- Owner: Matt Lightner; (Lightner Communications, LLC)
- Sister stations: WTRN, WRTA, WKMC, WBRX, WBXQ

History
- First air date: 1963 (as WWSF)
- Former call signs: WWSF (1963–1979); WAMQ (1979–1992); WJRV (1992–1996); WEBG (1996–2001); WBZV (2001–2003); WWGE (2003–2018)

Technical information
- Licensing authority: FCC
- Facility ID: 63425
- Class: C
- Power: 1,000 watts unlimited
- Translators: 101.3 W267CM (Johnstown); 107.1 W296ED (Altoona)

Links
- Public license information: Public file; LMS
- Webcast: Listen live
- Website: www.lightnercommunications.com/jack-fm/

WYUP (1400 AM) is a commercial radio station licensed to Loretto, Pennsylvania and serving Blair, and Cambria Counties in west central Pennsylvania. WYUP operates fulltime with 1,000 watts. The station is owned by Matt Lightner, through licensee Lightner Communications, LLC.

== Programming ==
As with most Jack FM stations, WYUP has no disc jockeys, relying entirely on pre-recorded liners from Howard Cogan, the voice of Jack FM nationwide.

== History ==
WYUP was first authorized in 1963, as WWSF, for Saint Francis College (now Saint Francis University) in Loretto, Pennsylvania (near Johnstown). It initially operated with 250 watts fulltime on 1400 kHz. The college had conditionally applied for this assignment in 1957, with the understanding that the frequency first had to be vacated by WJAC (later WKGE), which at the same time applied to move from 1400 kHz to 850 kHz.

The college continued its ownership of the station until 1979, when it was sold to Sherlock-Hart Broadcasting. Rebranded as WAMQ, the now country-formatted station moved from the college campus to the First United Federal Building in Ebensburg, where it remained until it was sold in August 1992 to Sherlock-Hart Broadcasting employee Tom Stevens, who had worked for Sherlock-Hart Broadcasting's FM property WBXQ in Altoona (but licensed to Cresson).

Stevens changed the call letters to WJRV and the format to soft rock, and relocated the studios to his home. Unforeseen circumstances later forced the station to go silent and Stevens to sell the station in 1996 to Allegheny Broadcasting Corporation. Under this new owner, the call letters were changed to WEBG (the call letters of another Ebensburg AM that had been given up years previously) before being sold to Radiowerks in 1999. From 2001 to 2003 the station's call letters were WBZV.

During the summer of 2012, the by-then WWGE (at the time running a conservative talk radio format) disappeared from the AM dial due to unknown circumstances, and the future of the station was also unknown. During the summer of 2013, WWGE returned to the air under a local marketing agreement (LMA) with Williamsport-based Pioneer Sports Productions, LLC. In February 2014, Radiowerks agreed to sell WWGE to Pioneer Sports Productions; the sale was consummated effective December 9, 2014. Owner Todd Bartley transferred WWGE's license to his wholly owned Colonial Radio Group of Williamsport, LLC on August 17, 2015. (This Colonial Radio Group is no longer related to the Colonial Radio Group run by Jeffrey Andrulonis; the similarity in names comes from Andrulonis's previous investment in the Williamsport company.)

On August 10, 2018, Bartley sold WWGE to Lightner Communications LLC. Lightner, owners of WTRN, changed the callsign to WYUP and constructed an FM translator in Altoona, Pennsylvania at 107.1 MHz. On October 23, 2018, WYUP dropped its adult standards/sports format, which overlapped extensively with new sister station WTRN, and began stunting to promote the adoption of a new format set to launch on November 1. The promotions included a rotating wheel of formats and potential brands, including polka ("Polka-Mania 107"), hip hop ("Red Hot 107.1"), classic country ("Billy"), classic rock ("Bullwinkle"), 50s/60s oldies ("Chill 107") and 70s/80s classic hits ("The Cucumber"). The stunt loop included songs from the previous adult standards format that were "blown up" a few seconds after beginning, along with Also sprach Zarathustra (Strauss) playing in between the songs. Included were questions like "Are you tuning in to hear music like this?" and the claim that "This station will be unlike any other in the history of our town" and that the new format was one that had never been tried before in the local area. Starting at 4:15 PM on November 1, two disk jockeys played a 45 minute set of songs with the name "Jack", which culminated with the launch of the "Jack FM" format at 5:00.

Logo while simulcasting WPHB

On March 7, 2022, WYUP's format began simulcasting on WPHB 1260 AM in Philipsburg, and translator W282CV 104.3 FM in State College.

The simulcast on WPHB ended on January 3, 2023, when WPHB switched to classic country, simulcasting WQWK 1450 AM State College.

== Translators ==
Broadcast translators for WYUP
Call sign	Frequency	City of license	FID	ERP (W)	HAAT	Class	Transmitter coordinates	FCC info
W267CM	101.3 FM	Johnstown, Pennsylvania	142127	250	54 m (177 ft)	D	40°22′16.2″N 78°59′4″W	LMS
W296ED	107.1 FM	Altoona, Pennsylvania	200530	94	30 m (98 ft)	D	40°24′11″N 78°31′35″W	LMS
