= WTRN =

Coordinates: 40°39′37″N 78°15′21″W

- Tyrone, Pennsylvania; United States
- Broadcast area: Tyrone, Pennsylvania
- Frequency: 1340 kHz
- Branding: 96.9/100.7 The Train

Programming
- Format: Classic hits
- Affiliations: Fox News Radio

Ownership
- Owner: Lightner Communications, LLC

History
- First air date: January 12, 1955
- Call sign meaning: TyRoNe, or "Train"

Technical information
- Licensing authority: FCC
- Facility ID: 1056
- Class: C
- Power: 1,000 watts (unlimited)
- Translators: 96.9 W245CZ (Altoona); 100.7 W264BZ (Tyrone)

Links
- Public license information: Public file; LMS
- Webcast: Listen Live
- Website: wtrnradio.com

WTRN is an American commercial AM radio station, licensed to the borough of Tyrone, Pennsylvania. The station operates at the federally assigned frequency of 1340 kHz with a full-time power output of 1,000 watts. WTRN also operates two FM translators. One at 100.7 MHz Tyrone and 96.9 MHz Altoona, Pennsylvania. WTRN was the flagship station for the former Allegheny Mountain Network (AMN).

== History ==
WTRN's beginnings were part of a boom in local radio station construction in the northern and central part of Pennsylvania that began in 1950. In 1947, Allegheny Mountain Network founder Cary H. Simpson helped build WHUN, where he also would serve as program director, in his hometown of Huntingdon, Pennsylvania; approximately 20 miles southeast of Tyrone in Huntingdon County. Inspired by the station's success, Simpson built the first station in his group, WKBI (AM) in St. Marys, Pennsylvania. As this was the very first station in his group, WKBI served as the flagship station for the other stations that Simpson would build and put on the air over the next four decades.

Desiring to put a station on the air in his newly adopted hometown of Tyrone, Simpson petitioned the FCC for an AM license to be assigned to Tyrone. A construction permit was granted, and Simpson signed WTRN on the air on January 12, 1955. Simpson also successfully applied for an FM license to also be assigned to Tyrone. That station, WGMR (which was sold to Forever Broadcasting in Altoona in 2008), was granted license to operate at 101.1 MHz and signed on August 15, 1961.

As WTRN was close to his home, Simpson moved AMN's corporate operations to this station. Many of AMN's properties were in communities that were large enough to make the radio business profitable, but perhaps not quite large enough to support a typical radio station's staff at the time. Thus, many duties were centralized (traffic, billing, upper management) in the Tyrone office, requiring only airstaff and sales consultants at the individual stations. This business model would start to become the accepted standard following the first round of FCC ownership limit changes that began in 1992.

WTRN, like its previous affiliate stations, continues to be community-focused, despite a trend of many rural radio stations with larger market penetration to serve larger markets.

Cary Simpson, in addition to his duties as AMN President, managed WTRN and did occasional on-air work such as parade broadcasts and interviews. He continued with these duties until his death December 27, 2016 at the age of 89, following a brief illness.

== Sale of WTRN ==
After Simpson's death, WTRN's license and assets were placed in the hands of Thomas Hoyne, Simpson's attorney and executor, while Simpson's estate was being settled. Hoyne agreed to sell WTRN to Lightner Communications, a subsidiary of Claysburg-based Lightner Electronics Inc, headed by broadcast engineer Matt Lightner.

The sale of WTRN from the Simpson estate to Lightner Communications, LLC was approved by the FCC on August 22, 2017. The sale was formally consummated on August 31. Lightner did not have any other radio station ownership interests at the time.

Following FCC approval of the sale, Lightner Communications began an extensive renovation of WTRN's studios and transmitter, resulting in a major improvement in sound quality and coverage. WTRN also began streaming its real-time audio over the internet and the TuneIn Radio mobile phone app.

== FM signals ==
In the early summer of 2009, WTRN began broadcasting in Tyrone on W264BZ 100.7 MHz.

W264BZ is an FM translator, which retransmits the WTRN 1340 AM signal on the FM band at 100.7 MHz. When Lightner Communications LLC purchased the station a minor change was filed with the FCC to expand the coverage of the W264BZ translator which was made possible because of the FCC's AM revitalization program. The antenna and all transmission equipment was replaced. W264BZ now has excellent coverage across all of central and northern Blair County, PA and parts of Centre County, PA.

In January 2018, WTRN began broadcasting in Altoona, PA on a new translator W245CZ 96.9 MHz. W245CZ Coverage This translator fills in the southern part of WTRN's AM signal providing FM quality coverage throughout Altoona and southern Blair County.

== WTRN today ==
On February 17, 2018, WTRN switched from its satellite-delivered format to a new local soft AC based format and rebranded as "Easy Favorites 96.9 - 100.7 WTRN". During the day WTRN focuses on at work listenership with the new format. Continuing with WTRN's full service traditions, evenings and weekends on WTRN are often filled with local and regional sports, live broadcasts throughout the community, etc. WTRN also continued its daily local newscast and features ABC news for national news and sports updates. WTRN was the first of several Pennsylvania radio station purchases for Lightner; a few months later, Lightner purchased the other AC/adult standards station in the region, AM 1400, and flipped it to adult hits as WYUP. He then in mid-2019 filed to purchase two AM stations (with FM translators) in Altoona, another AC/standards station WKMC (a former AMN member), a heritage news/talk station WRTA, along with two FM stations Mix-94.7 WBRX, and Classic Rock Q-94 WBXQ.

On September 25, 2020, WTRN changed their format from soft adult contemporary to classic hits, branded as "96.9/100.7 Classic Favorites".

On March 27, 2023 WTRN adjusted their name to 96.9/100.7 The Train while still airing a classic hits format.
