= Georgette Ioup =

American linguistics professor (1940–2024)

- Born: May 17, 1940; Altoona, Pennsylvania, U.S.
- Died: May 28, 2024 (aged 84)
- Burial place: New Orleans, Louisiana, U.S.
- Occupations: linguistics professor and researcher
- Employer: University of New Orleans
- Known for: Second-language acquisition research

Georgette Ioup (May 17, 1940 – May 28, 2024) was an American linguistics professor and researcher. She examined the ways people learn new languages (called second-language acquisition), and one of her research papers was considered "one of the most impactful studies published in SSLA [Studies in Second Language Acquisition]", according to Cambridge University Press.

== Early life ==
Georgette Ioup was born May 17, 1940, in Altoona, Pennsylvania, to Elias George and Angeline (Kattouf) Ioup. In 1958, she graduated from Altoona High School. She earned a B.A. degree in classical languages from Wilson College in 1963, an M.A. in linguistics from New York University in 1973, and a Ph.D. in linguistics from the CUNY Graduate Center in 1975.

== Academic career ==
From 1985 to 2007, Ioup worked as a professor in the Department of English at the University of New Orleans. Before joining the University of New Orleans, Ioup served as a professor at the American University in Cairo and the University of Washington in Seattle.

During her career, Ioup's linguistics research was published in several academic journals, including Linguistics and Philosophy and Language Learning: A Journal of Research in Language Studies.

In 1987, she and linguistics researcher Steven H. Weinberger were co-editors of the book Interlanguage Phonology: The Acquisition of a Second Language Sound System (Newbury House Publishers). A 1990 review of this book in Second Language Research called it a "well integrated, comprehensive mixture of established and recent articles, covering all major issues of phonology."

Ioup was the primary author of "Reexamining the Critical Period Hypothesis: A Case Study of Successful Adult SLA in a Naturalistic Environment," published in March 1994 in the journal Studies in Second Language Acquisition, which examined "the ability of adults to achieve nativelike competence in [a] second language" without the benefit of formal schooling. On May 22, 2018, Cambridge University Press released a video interview of Ioup discussing this article, as part of the press's series on "authors of key papers" talking about "their influential articles." In the interview, Ioup explained that while teaching in Egypt, she had met a British student, Julie, who reported learning Egyptian Arabic "as an adult but in the manner of a child," meaning the student never had formal training in Egyptian Arabic and could only speak the language, not read or write it. Ioup recounted that this student's ability to learn Egyptian Arabic led Ioup to reconsider the so-called critical period hypothesis, which claims that languages need to be learned at a young age (usually before puberty) in order to achieve nativelike fluency.

== Personal life ==
Ioup had two brothers: George E. Ioup (March 26, 1939 – January 20, 2016), a former professor of physics at the University of New Orleans, and William E. Ioup, a one-time president of Superior Tree Company in Arkansas.

She had a son, Elias Z. K. Ioup, and a daughter, Carole Mashamesh.

Georgette Ioup told The Times-Picayune/The New Orleans Advocate that she left Seattle and relocated to New Orleans "because she wanted to raise her son near her kind-hearted brother [George]."

== Death ==
Ioup died May 28, 2024, at age 84. She is buried at St. Louis Cemetery in New Orleans.
