= Altoona, Pennsylvania =

City in Pennsylvania, United States

- City
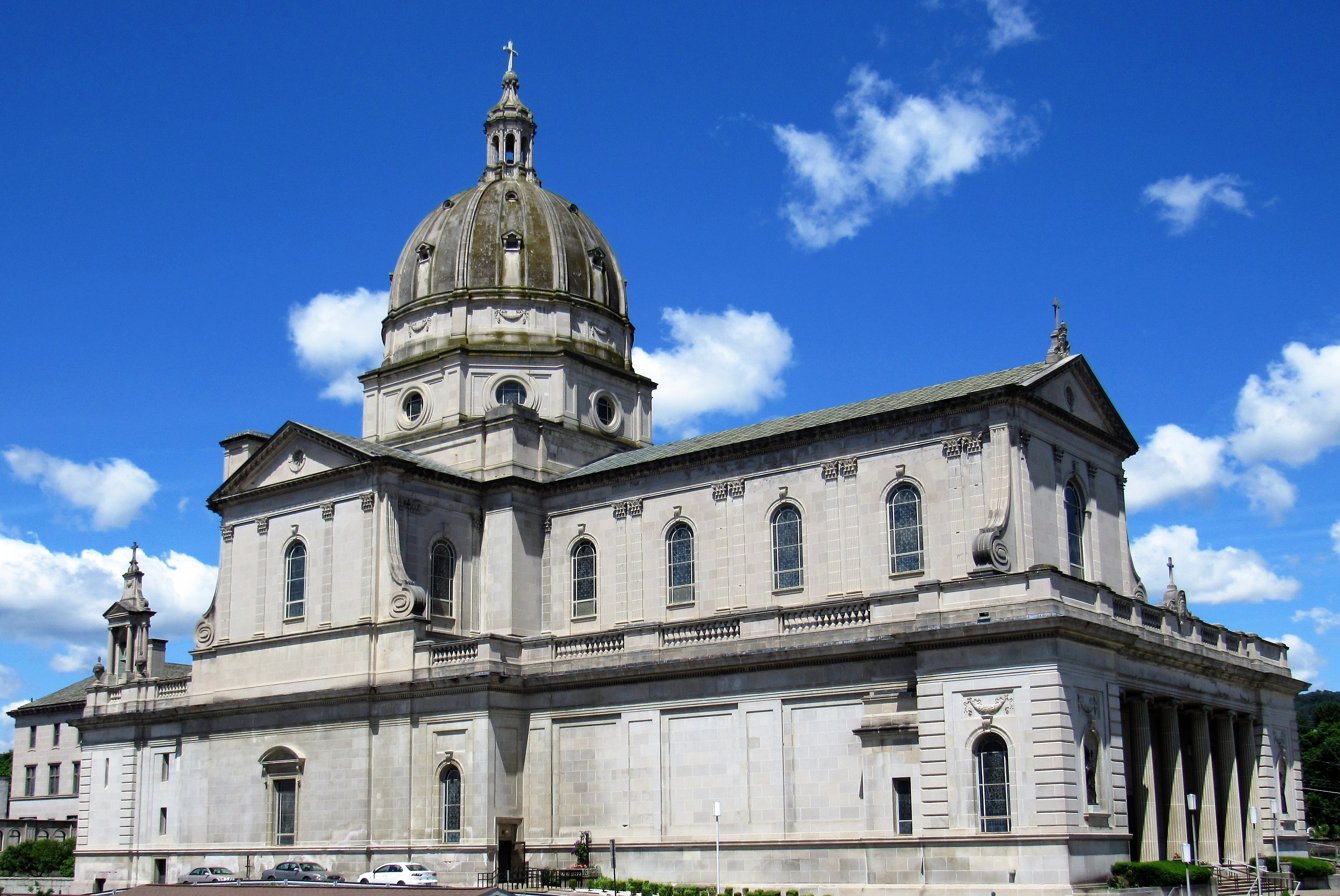
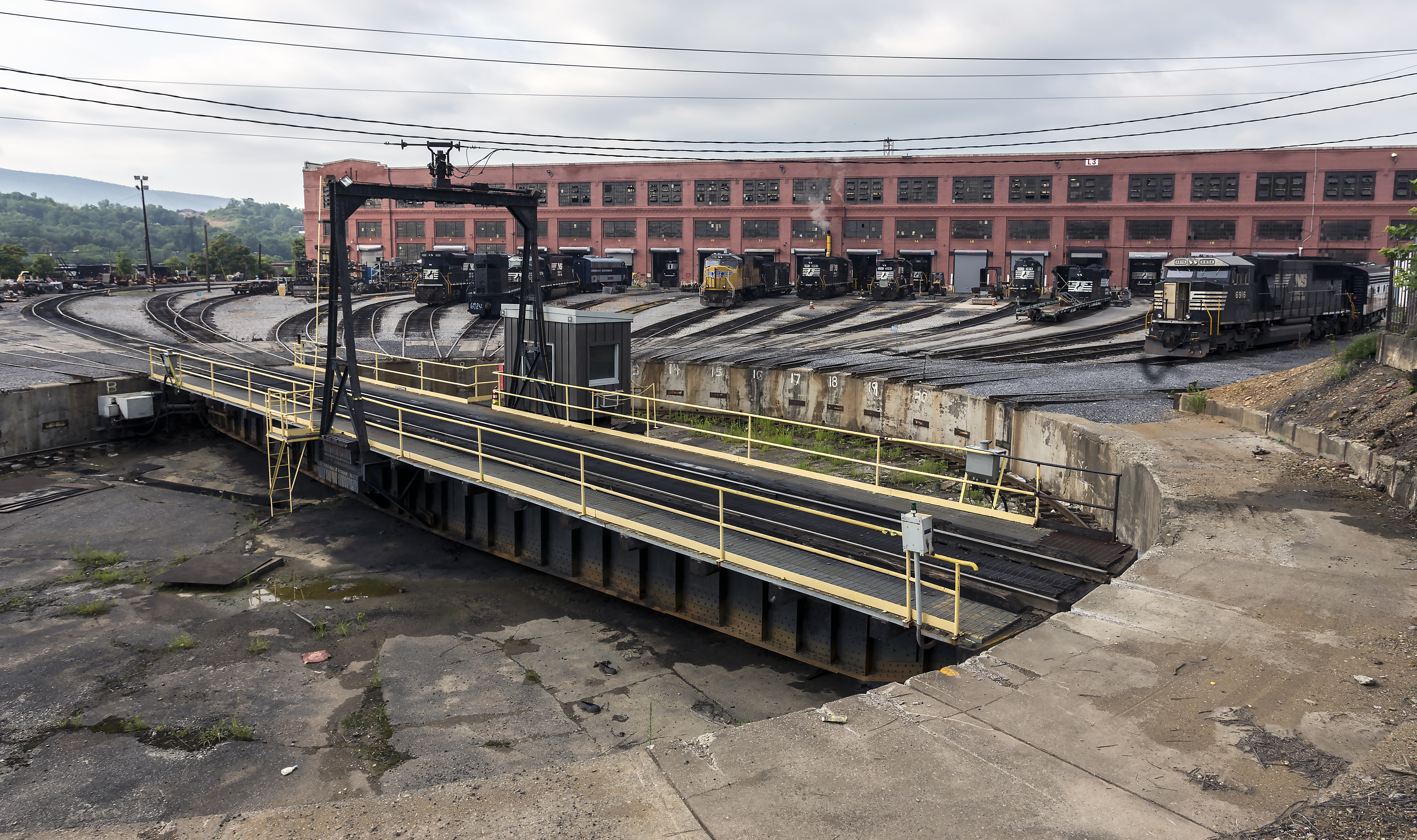
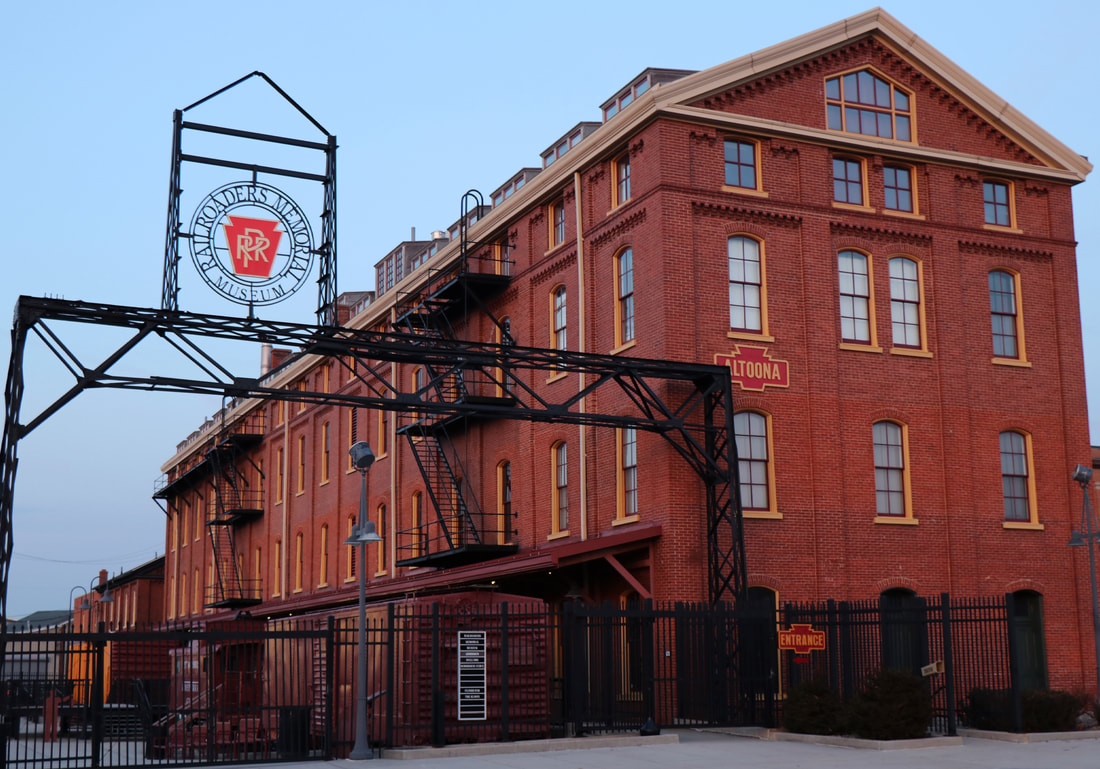
- Skyline of Altoona Cathedral of the Blessed Sacrament Altoona Works Railroaders Memorial Museum Horseshoe Curve

- Seal
- Nicknames: The Mountain City, Railroad City
- Location of Altoona in Blair County, Pennsylvania

- Location within Pennsylvania Location within the United States
- Coordinates: 40.51°N 78.40°W
- Country: United States
- State: Pennsylvania
- County: Blair County
- Founded: 1849
- Incorporated (borough): February 6, 1854
- Incorporated (city): 1868

Government
  - Mayor: Matt Pacifico (R)

Area
  - City: 9.79 sq mi (25.36 km^{2})
  - Land: 9.79 sq mi (25.36 km^{2})
  - Water: 0 sq mi (0.00 km^{2})
- Elevation: 1,161 ft (354 m)

Population (2020)
  - City: 43,963
  - Density: 4,490.2/sq mi (1,733.67/km^{2})
  - Urban: 79,930
  - Metro: 121,829
  - Demonym: Altoonian
- Time zone: UTC−5 (EST)
  - Summer (DST): UTC−4 (EDT)
- ZIP Codes: 16601–16603
- Area code: 814
- FIPS code: 42-02184
- GNIS feature ID: 1214939
- Website: altoonapa.gov

Pennsylvania Historical Marker
- Designated: April 01, 1947

Altoona (/ælˈtuːnə/ al-TOO-nə) is a city in Blair County, Pennsylvania, United States. The population was 43,963 at the time of the 2020 census. It is the principal city of the Altoona metropolitan area, which includes all of Blair County and was recorded as having a population of 122,823.

Altoona was established in 1849 by the Pennsylvania Railroad. Having grown around the railroad industry, the city has worked to recover from industrial decline and urban decentralization experienced in recent decades. The city is home to the Altoona Curve baseball team of the Eastern League, which is the AA affiliate of the Pittsburgh Pirates Major League Baseball team. They play at Peoples Natural Gas Field in Altoona. The Altoona Symphony Orchestra has called Altoona home since 1928. Prominent landmarks include the Horseshoe Curve, the Railroaders Memorial Museum, the Juniata Shops of the Altoona Works, the Mishler Theatre, the Cathedral of the Blessed Sacrament, and the Jaffa Shrine Center.

== History ==
=== Etymology ===
One explanation of the city's name is that the word Altoona is a derivative of the Latin word altus, meaning high.

An alternate theory is given in Pennsylvania Place Names, a compendium published in 1925. It suggests that Colonel Beverly Mayer of Columbia, Pennsylvania, a civil engineer of the Pennsylvania Central Railway, was the person who named Altoona after the city of Altona in the Duchy of Holstein, which became part of the Kingdom of Prussia in 1866 and of Germany in 1871. The German Altona, which is today a district of Hamburg, lies on the right bank of the Elbe and is an important railway and manufacturing center.

Popular belief has it that the Hamburg district of Altona owes its name to its close vicinity to Hamburg. Supposedly, Hamburg's merchants considered their rival to the west 'all zu nah' ('far too close'), which over time became Altona.

In 1849, David Robinson sold his farm to Archibald Wright of Philadelphia, who transferred the property to his son, John A. Wright. The son laid out the property into building lots, and became one of the founders of Altoona. John A. Wright is considered another person who may have named the city. According to his own statement, he had spent considerable time in Cherokee country in Georgia. He was attracted to the name of the Georgia town Allatoona, which he believed meant "the high lands of great worth." An 1883 publication favored the Cherokee derivation, stating that "Its name is not derived from the Latin word altus nor from the French word alto, as has frequently been asserted and published, but from the beautiful, liquid, and expressive Cherokee word Allatoona."

For 60 days in 2011, the city officially changed its name to "POM Wonderful Presents: The Greatest Movie Ever Sold" in exchange for $25,000 as part of a marketing gimmick for the movie of the same name.

=== Founding and growth ===
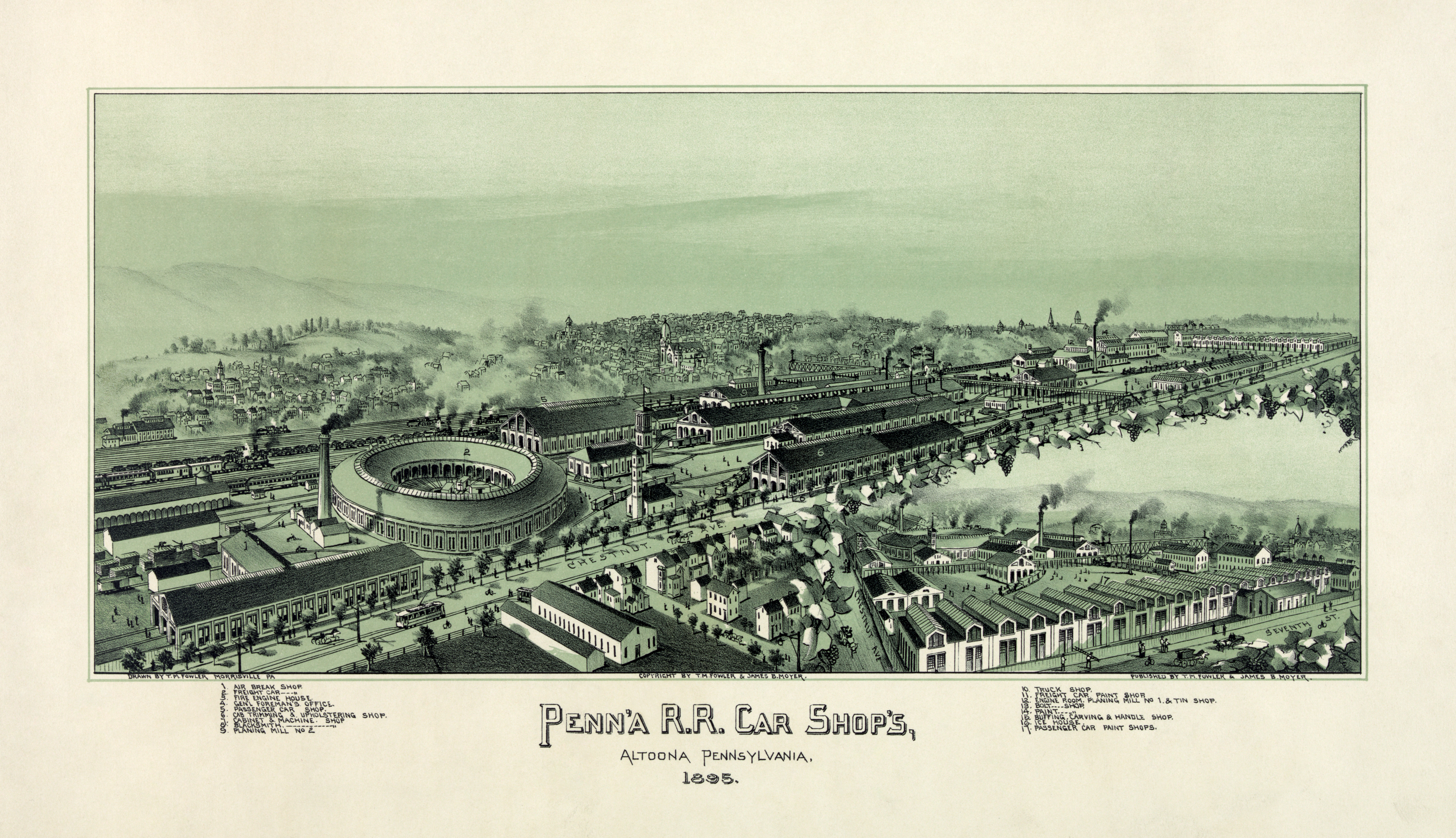
Altoona in 1895: a Pennsylvania Railroad town, a lithograph by Thaddeus Mortimer Fowler

Prior to European settlement, the Altoona area was inhabited by the Iroquois Confederacy. Altoona was founded by the Pennsylvania Railroad (PRR) in 1849 as the site for a shop and maintenance complex. Altoona was incorporated as a borough on February 6, 1854, and as a city under legislation approved on April 3, 1867, and February 8, 1868.

In late September 1862, Altoona was home to the War Governors' Conference which brought together 13 governors of Union states. This body gave early approval to the Emancipation Proclamation. The town grew rapidly in the late 19th century. Its population approximately 2,000 in 1854, 10,000 in 1870, and 20,000 in 1880. The demand for locomotives during the Civil War stimulated much of this growth, and by the later years of the war, Altoona was known as a valuable city for the North. Altoona was also the site of the first Interstate Commission meeting to create and design the Gettysburg National Cemetery following the devastating Battle of Gettysburg. The centrality and convenience of the town's rail transportation brought these two important gatherings to the city during the war.

=== Horseshoe Curve ===
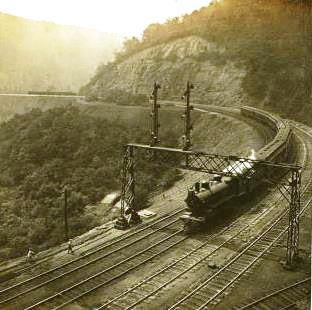
A stereo card of a train on the Horseshoe Curve, c. 1907

Horseshoe Curve, a curved section of track built by the Pennsylvania Railroad, located at MP 242 on the NS Pittsburgh line, has become a tourist attraction and National Historic Landmark. The engineered curve was built to help trains cross the Allegheny Ridge, a barrier to westward trade. Construction of the Erie Canal in New York 20 years earlier had diverted much port traffic from Philadelphia to New York City, feeding that city's commercial dominance. Because the curve was an industrial link to the western United States, Horseshoe Curve was a primary target of eight Nazi saboteurs who had landed during World War II from U-boats of Nazi Germany's Kriegsmarine during Operation Pastorius.

At its peak in the early 20th century, PRR's Altoona Works complex employed about 15,000 people and covered three miles (5 km) in length, 218 acres (88 ha) of yards and 37 acres (15 ha) of indoor workshop floor space in 122 buildings. The PRR built 7,873 of its own locomotives at the Works, the last in 1946. PRR shaped the city, creating the city's fire departments and moving the hospital to a site nearer to the shop's gates. Today, the fire department employs 65 people and is the largest career department between Harrisburg and Pittsburgh. PRR sponsored a city band and constructed Cricket Field, a sports complex. In 1853, the PRR built the Mechanic's Library, the first industrial library in the nation, which exists today as the Altoona Area Public Library. With the decline in railroad demand after World War II, things began to decline. Many treasures of the city's history disappeared, including the Logan House Hotel and railroad shops.

Horseshoe Curve is a popular tourist attraction, particularly for train aficionados. There is a funicular that takes visitors to a viewing area, which can also be reached by climbing 194 steps.

=== 1949 tornado ===
On May 22, 1949, at about 6 pm, a tornado moved through the southern part of Altoona. According to the Altoona Mirror, the tornado touched down near Sugar Run Road in the Canan Station area of Allegheny Township and cut a 100-yard (91 m) swath of destruction through the southwestern portion of Altoona. Houses lost shingles and there was extensive tree damage in the Eldorado and Llyswen sections of town.

Another tornado touched down in Morrisons Cove, 20 miles (32 km) south of Altoona. Houses were unroofed and barns were destroyed in the Henrietta and Millerstown area. A 17-year-old girl was injured in Henrietta. The damage done by these tornadoes is consistent with winds of 105–110 miles per hour (169–177 km/h).

A map made by Ted Fujita in 1974 of all of the tornadoes in the U.S. between 1930 and 1974 shows these two tornadoes mapped as F1 tornadoes on the Fujita Scale.

=== Present ===
Altoona is one of the dual seats of the Roman Catholic Diocese of Altoona–Johnstown. The Cathedral of the Blessed Sacrament was made a cathedral and rechristened from St. John's Church in 1851.

The Altoona Mirror newspaper, founded in 1876 by Harry Slep, is Altoona's oldest media outlet. Today, the newspaper has a daily circulation of 32,000 and a Sunday circulation of 39,000. Approximately 13,000 people read the online edition of the newspaper each day.

Altoona is home to the world's oldest wooden roller coaster, the Leap-The-Dips, located in Lakemont Park, although it has not operated since 2024.

== Geography ==
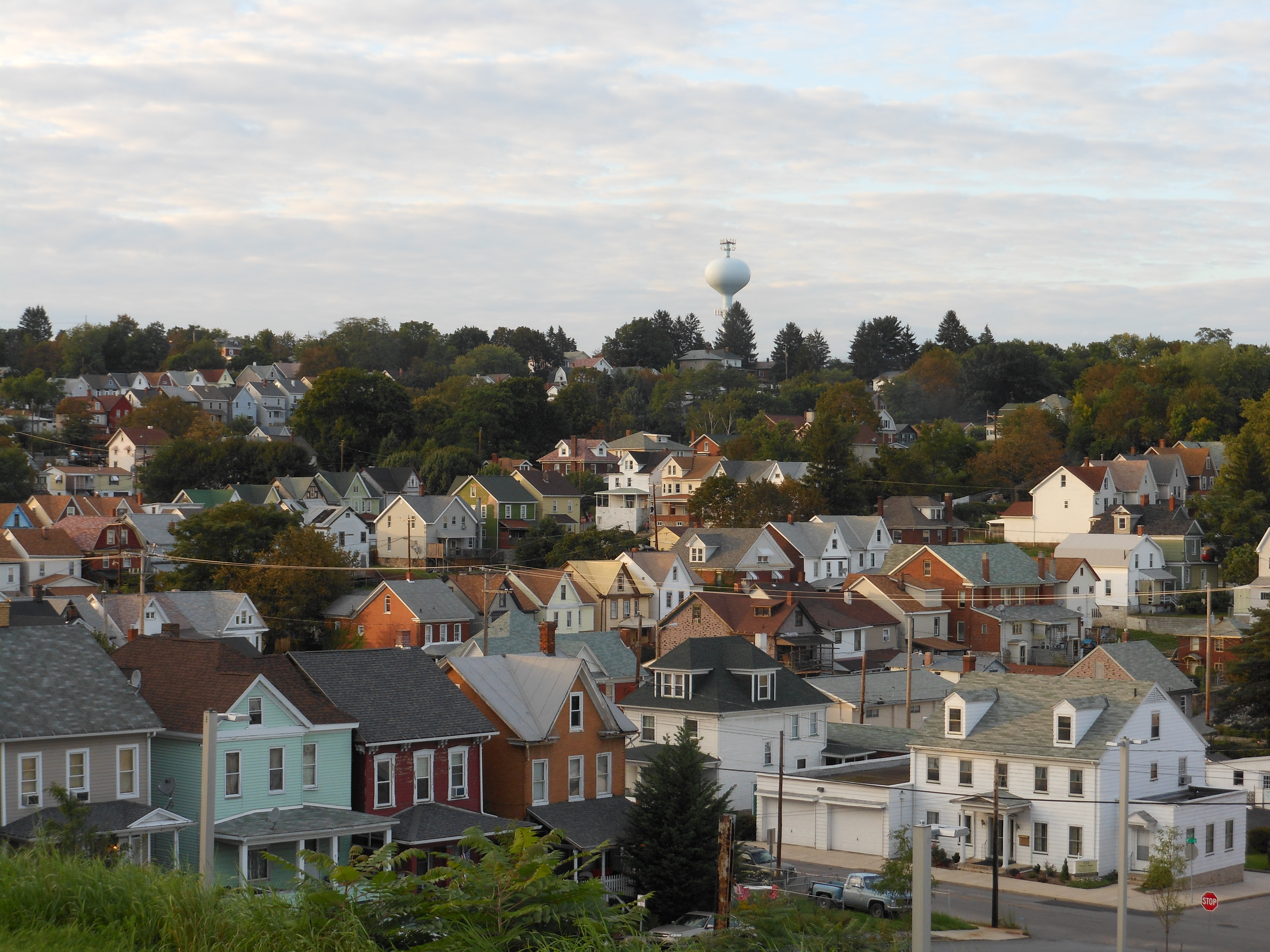
The Fairview neighborhood in Altoona

Altoona lies at the base of Brush Mountain within Logan Valley and Pleasant Valley. According to the United States Census Bureau, the city has a total area of 9.8 square miles (25.4 km^{2}), all land. Altoona is situated in the Allegheny Mountains.

=== Neighborhoods ===
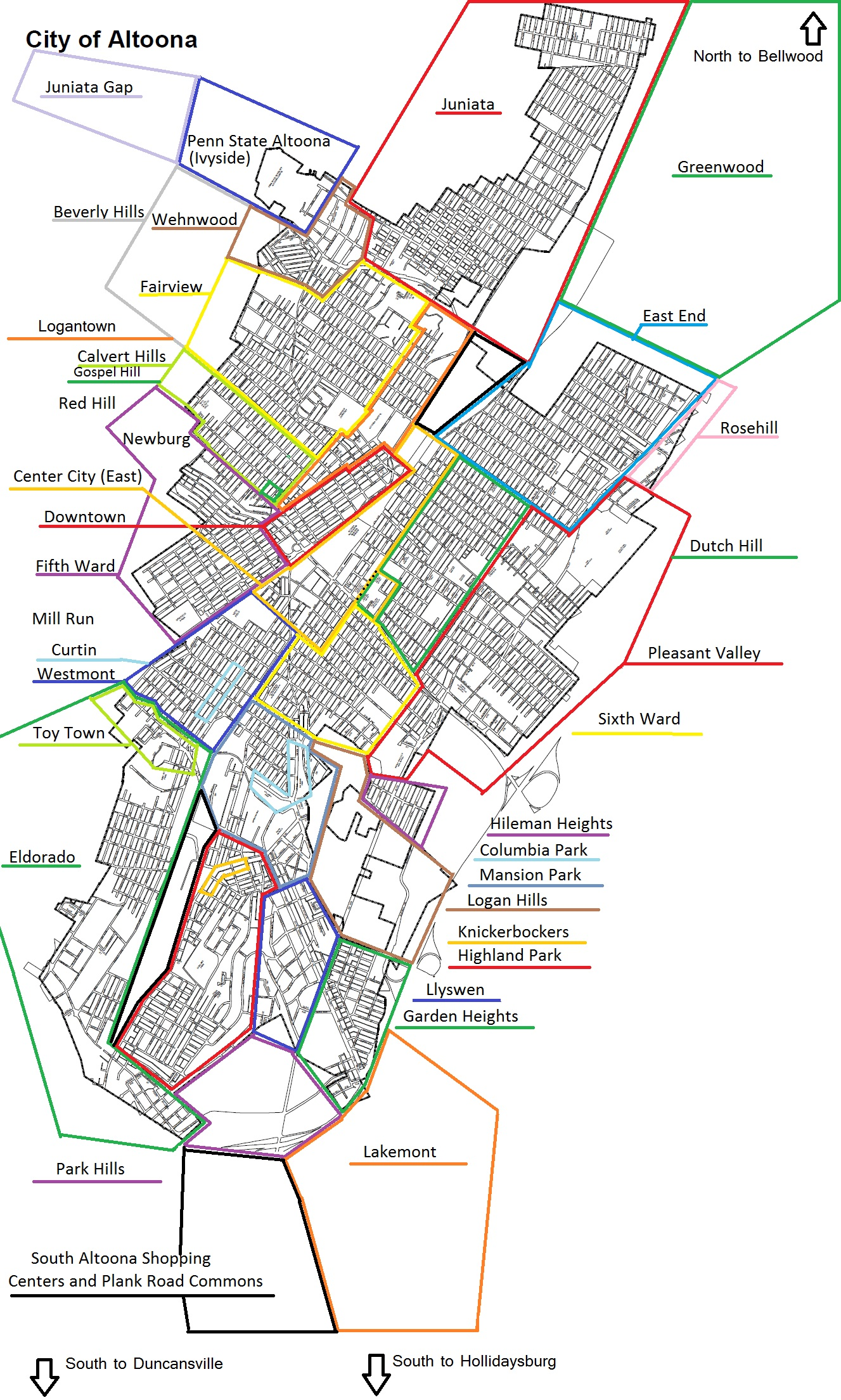
Map of Altoona neighborhoods

The main sections of Altoona are Downtown Altoona, Center City, Logantown, Fairview, Juniata, Wehnwood, Calvert Hills, 5th Ward, Westmont, Eldorado, East End, Dutch Hill, Pleasant Valley, Hileman Heights, 6th Ward, Mansion Park, Llyswen, Garden Heights, and Highland Park. Some significant neighborhoods are Little Italy, Gospel Hill, Toy Town, Columbia Park, Knickerbockers, and Curtin. Some areas within Logan Township, outside the city limits but still considered sections of Altoona, are Lakemont, Greenwood, Bellmeade, Westfall, Newburg, and Red Hill. Many of the older districts consist of a mix of rowhouses and individual homes, which were a common building style in railroad towns in order to provide for worker and manager housing, respectively.

==== Downtown ====
The downtown is the cultural and commercial center of Altoona and straddles the famous railroads. As is typical of a traditional city layout, the downtown is centrally located and contains significant development in all directions. Much of the area is listed on the National Register of Historic Places as the Downtown Altoona Historic District. Popular landmarks include the Mishler Theatre, the Penn Alto Building (formerly the Penn Alto Hotel), the Gable's Building, City Hall, the Cathedral of the Blessed Sacrament, and Eleventh Avenue itself.

Altoona has several notable churches, including the Cathedral of the Blessed Sacrament at the corner of 13th Street and 13th Avenue, the building on the corner of 12th Street and 14th Avenue that previously housed the First Presbyterian Church, and the First Lutheran Church on the corner of 14th Street and 12th Avenue. The Station Medical Center, formerly known as the Station Mall, was a downtown mall built during the 1970s in place of many old railroad shops. The downtown contains most of what is known as Altoona's Little Italy district.

Because of the geography of the area, exact or natural boundaries for Downtown are not present. Therefore, Downtown is generally defined by what the city has zoned as Central Business: between 13th Avenue and the PRR Expressway, and from 7th Street to 16th Street. However, it is common for areas within Logantown and Center City to be expressed locally as "downtown".

The Texas Hot Dog was originally created in downtown Altoona in 1918; however, the Paterson, New Jersey Texas Hot Dog location, which opened in 1924, is more famous.

===== Architecture =====
The commercial core of the downtown includes many multistory residential, commercial, and mixed-use facilities designed at the turn of the 20th century in a mix of Victorian, Edwardian Baroque, and Neo-Romanesque styles. This style features high ceilings, resulting in taller buildings than is typical for the number of floors. The high ceilings are typically made of either tin or plaster, although sometimes a drop ceiling is utilized.

Individual homes originally provided housing to managers and executives of the PRR and have structural similarities to Victorian or Edwardian mansions, but built very narrow and tall. These are sometimes used as double or triple family apartments or even converted into commercial space. Outside of the commercial core is a mosaic of multistory commercial structures, mixed-use facilities, single story commercial structures, apartment buildings, multiunit housing, and single-family homes.

The U.S. post office in Altoona contains two oil-on-canvas WPA-commissioned murals painted by Lorin Thompson in 1938, titled Pioneers of Altoona and Growth of the Road. Murals were produced from 1934 to 1943 in the United States through the Section of Painting and Sculpture, later called the Section of Fine Arts, of the Treasury Department.

=== Climate ===
Under the Köppen climate classification, Altoona falls within either a hot-summer humid continental climate (Dfa) if the 0 °C (32 °F) isotherm is used or a humid subtropical climate (Cfa) if the −3 °C (27 °F) isotherm is used. Summers are hot and winters are moderately cold with wide variations in temperature. The monthly daily average temperature ranges from 28.4 °F (−2.0 °C) in January to 72.4 °F (22.4 °C) in July, although extremes in temperature have ranged from −25 °F (−32 °C) in 1904 to 103 °F (39 °C) in 2011. Total precipitation is greatest in September and least in February.

Climate data for Altoona, Pennsylvania (Altoona–Blair County Airport), 1991–2020 normals, extremes 1926–present
Month	Jan	Feb	Mar	Apr	May	Jun	Jul	Aug	Sep	Oct	Nov	Dec	Year
Record high °F (°C)	78 (26)	76 (24)	85 (29)	91 (33)	94 (34)	97 (36)	103 (39)	102 (39)	97 (36)	90 (32)	82 (28)	74 (23)	103 (39)
Mean daily maximum °F (°C)	35.5 (1.9)	38.6 (3.7)	47.7 (8.7)	61.0 (16.1)	70.9 (21.6)	78.6 (25.9)	82.9 (28.3)	81.1 (27.3)	74.2 (23.4)	62.7 (17.1)	50.5 (10.3)	39.9 (4.4)	60.3 (15.7)
Daily mean °F (°C)	28.4 (−2.0)	30.7 (−0.7)	38.7 (3.7)	50.4 (10.2)	60.3 (15.7)	68.5 (20.3)	72.4 (22.4)	70.6 (21.4)	63.7 (17.6)	53.0 (11.7)	42.3 (5.7)	33.1 (0.6)	51.0 (10.6)
Mean daily minimum °F (°C)	21.3 (−5.9)	22.7 (−5.2)	29.8 (−1.2)	39.8 (4.3)	49.7 (9.8)	58.4 (14.7)	61.8 (16.6)	60.0 (15.6)	53.2 (11.8)	43.2 (6.2)	34.1 (1.2)	26.2 (−3.2)	41.7 (5.4)
Record low °F (°C)	−25 (−32)	−20 (−29)	−4 (−20)	8 (−13)	25 (−4)	32 (0)	38 (3)	34 (1)	26 (−3)	15 (−9)	0 (−18)	−12 (−24)	−25 (−32)
Average precipitation inches (mm)	2.23 (57)	1.95 (50)	3.01 (76)	3.28 (83)	3.72 (94)	3.42 (87)	3.48 (88)	3.26 (83)	3.96 (101)	2.92 (74)	2.85 (72)	2.57 (65)	36.65 (931)
Average precipitation days (≥ 0.01 in)	11.2	9.7	12.0	12.7	13.6	12.3	12.1	10.8	10.3	10.8	9.9	10.3	135.7
Source 1: NOAA
Source 2: PA State Climatologist

== Demographics ==
Historical population
Census	Pop.	Note	%±
1860	3,591		—
1870	10,610		195.5%
1880	19,710		85.8%
1890	30,337		53.9%
1900	38,973		28.5%
1910	52,127		33.8%
1920	60,331		15.7%
1930	82,054		36.0%
1940	80,214		−2.2%
1950	77,177		−3.8%
1960	69,407		−10.1%
1970	63,115		−9.1%
1980	57,078		−9.6%
1990	51,881		−9.1%
2000	49,523		−4.5%
2010	46,320		−6.5%
2020	43,963		−5.1%

=== 2020 census ===
As of the 2020 census, Altoona had a population of 43,963. The median age was 40.7 years. 20.9% of residents were under the age of 18 and 18.9% of residents were 65 years of age or older. For every 100 females there were 94.8 males, and for every 100 females age 18 and over there were 91.9 males age 18 and over.

The city is considered urban rather than rural.

There were 18,669 households in Altoona, of which 26.3% had children under the age of 18 living in them. Of all households, 37.1% were married-couple households, 20.9% were households with a male householder and no spouse or partner present, and 32.7% were households with a female householder and no spouse or partner present. About 34.3% of all households were made up of individuals and 15.5% had someone living alone who was 65 years of age or older.

There were 20,672 housing units, of which 9.7% were vacant. The homeowner vacancy rate was 2.0% and the rental vacancy rate was 9.1%.

Racial composition as of the 2020 census
Race	Number	Percent
White	39,049	88.8%
Black or African American	1,872	4.3%
American Indian and Alaska Native	81	0.2%
Asian	262	0.6%
Native Hawaiian and Other Pacific Islander	5	0.0%
Some other race	354	0.8%
Two or more races	2,340	5.3%
Hispanic or Latino (of any race)	770	1.8%

=== 2010 census ===
As of the 2010 census, the city was 93.8% White, 3.3% Black or African American, 0.1% Native American, 0.4% Asian, and 2.0% were two or more races. 1.3% of the population was of Hispanic or Latino ancestry.

=== 2000 census ===
The 2000 Census reported the following predominate ancestry/ethnicities: German (35%), Irish (17%), Italian (12%), English (7%), Polish (4%), Black or African American (2%), Dutch (2%), Scotch-Irish (2%), French (2%), Scottish (1%), Pennsylvania German (1%), Welsh (1%), Swedish (1%), Slovak (1%).

As of the 2000 census, there were 49,523 people, 20,059 households, and 12,576 families residing in the city. The population density was 5,069.7 inhabitants per square mile (1,957.4/km^{2}). There were 21,681 housing units at an average density of 2,219.5 per square mile (857.0/km^{2}). The racial makeup of the city was 96.01% White, 2.49% African American, 0.10% Native American, 0.32% Asian, 0.02% Pacific Islander, 0.24% from other races, and 0.83% from two or more races. Hispanic or Latino of any race were 0.74% of the population.

There were 20,059 households, out of which 28.4% had children under the age of 18 living with them, 44.6% were married couples living together, 13.8% had a female householder with no husband present, and 37.3% were non-families. 31.6% of all households were made up of individuals, and 14.7% had someone living alone who was 65 years of age or older. The average household size was 2.37 and the average family size was 2.98.

In the city, the population was spread out, with 22.9% under the age of 18, 10.9% from 18 to 24, 27.3% from 25 to 44, 22.0% from 45 to 64, and 16.8% who were 65 years of age or older. The median age was 37 years. For every 100 females, there were 88.3 males. For every 100 females age 18 and over, there were 84.5 males.

The median income for a household in the city was $28,248, and the median income for a family was $36,758. Males had a median income of $28,851 versus $21,242 for females. The per capita income for the city was $15,213. About 12.9% of families and 17.7% of the population were below the poverty line, including 24.1% of those under age 18 and 9.0% of those age 65 or over.

== Economy ==
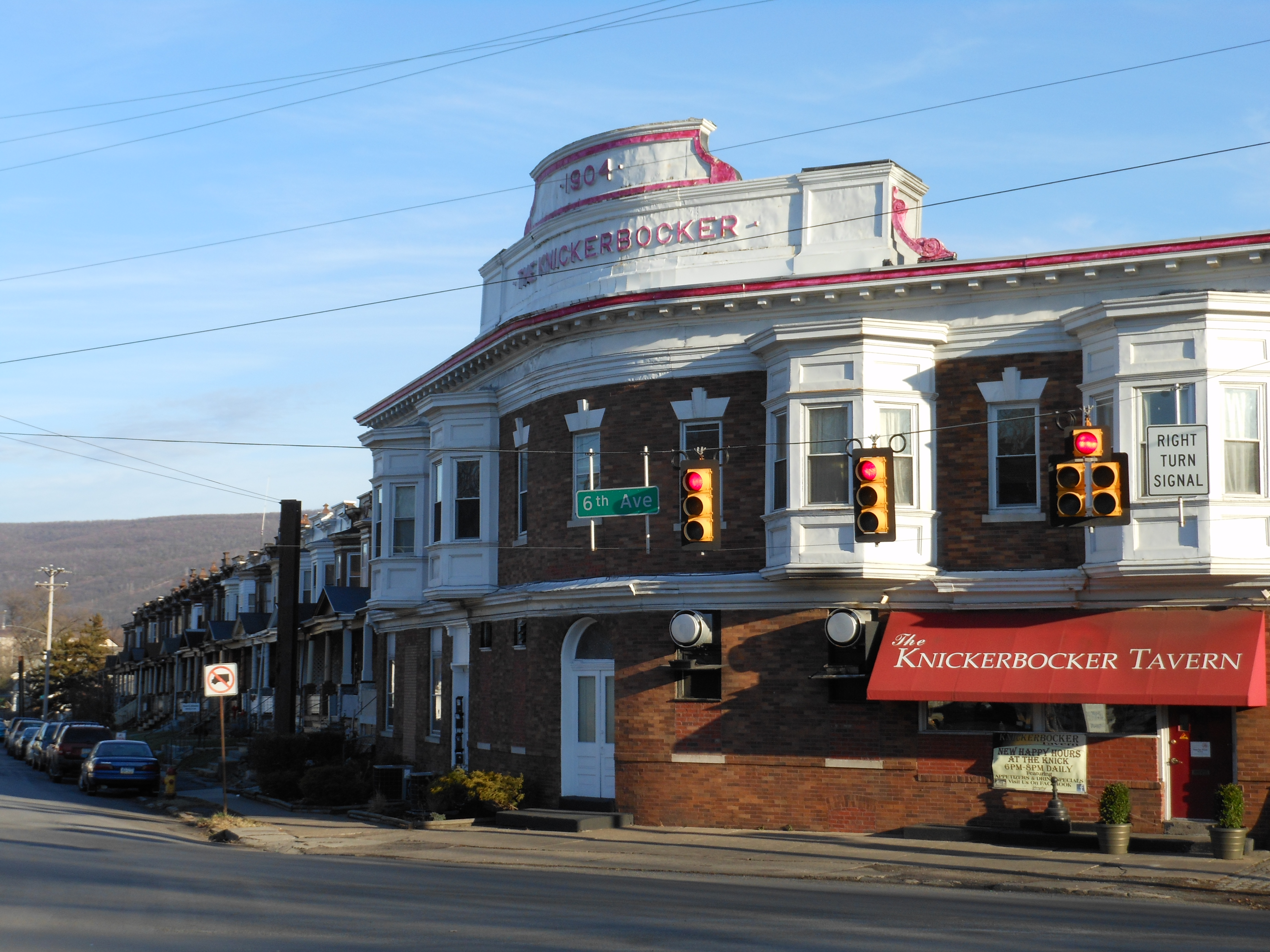
Knickerbocker Tavern

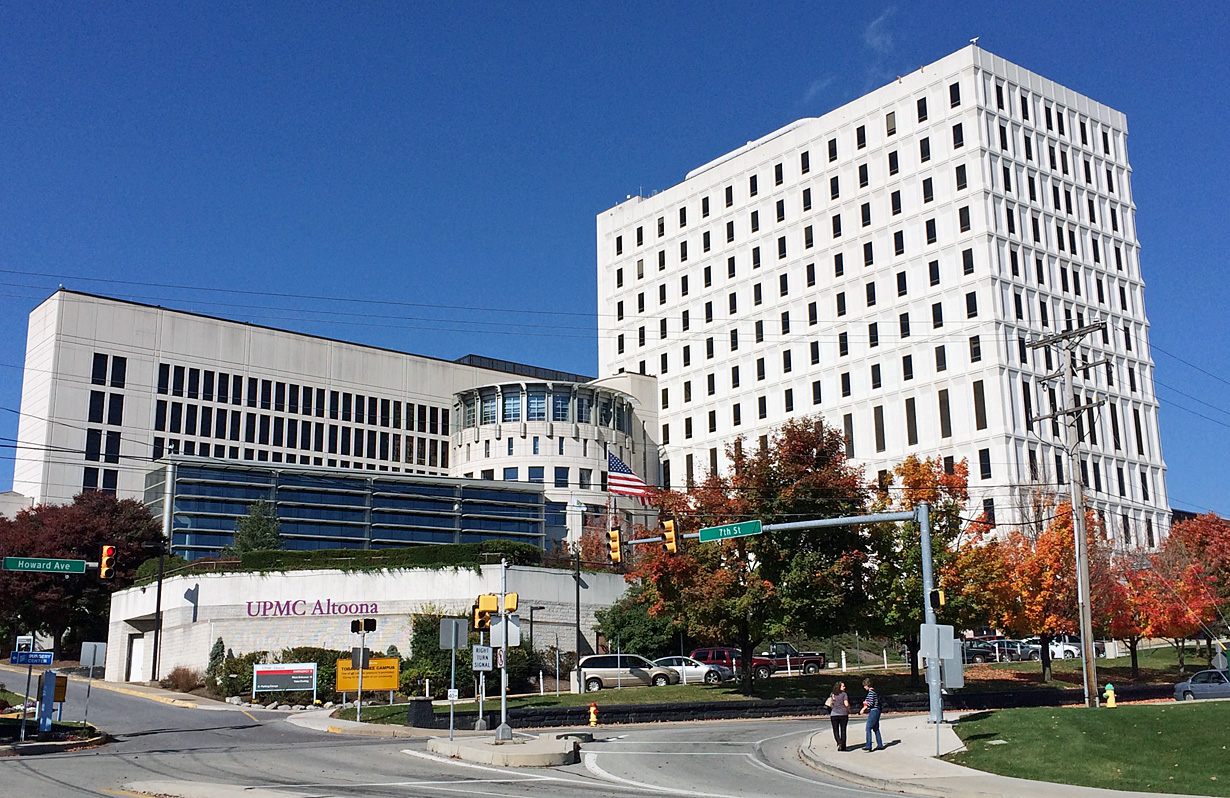
UPMC Altoona serves as a regional hub of the University of Pittsburgh Medical Center system.

Historically, the sole economic force driving the growth of Altoona into a city was the Pennsylvania Railroad (PRR). While the various local railroad shops still employ over a thousand people, they are no longer the driving economic engine of the area as they once were.

The top field of employment in Altoona and the metro area is the healthcare industry. Facilities include: UPMC Altoona with its many local facilities that employ thousands, Healthsouth Rehabilitation Hospital and its several local facilities, James E. Van Zandt VA Medical Center, dozens of doctors offices, and over 20 nursing homes and assisted living facilities.

Altoona serves as the corporate home to Sheetz, a rapidly growing convenience store and gasoline chain with over 800 locations in the Northeast.

Altoona also serves as the headquarters to the candy company Boyer. Famous for their Mallo Cup, the company was founded in 1936, 42 years after the founding of The Hershey Company in Hershey.

Another massive employer is the retail and service industries. Altoona is the linchpin of the Tri-City Region. Its location along I-99 draws from a large trade area over a wide geographic area that extends to State College and Johnstown and over 40 miles (64 km) south along I-99 past I-70.

Altoona draws the retail customers into the region because of its centralized location. Retail areas include:

- Downtown region.
- The 17th Street corridor including what remains of the Station Mall.
- Certain large zoned sections along Logan Boulevard and 6th Avenue.
- The Logan Valley Mall which is a major retail staple of the area.
- Approximately 3.5 miles (5.6 km) stretch of Pleasant Valley Boulevard and Valley View Boulevard as they converge into Plank Road, consisting of numerous stores and shopping centers. This area plus Route 764 which runs through Altoona and the northern and southern suburbs is known as the "Green Banana".
- The Logan Town Centre which is the newest shopping center in the area and sits directly next to I-99.

=== Industry ===
As is typical in many Rust Belt cities, the economic downturn of the railroad resulted in the closure of many of the downtown's landmark stores and industries. The simultaneous rise in prominence of the automobile shifted commercial development to the suburbs of Altoona. However, through recent revitalization efforts, Altoona's downtown maintains a significant level of economic vitality and hosts few office and residential vacancies. The downtown maintains a significant focus on pedestrian-oriented development, as evidenced by the presence of more pedestrian bridges and underpasses across the railroad tracks (connecting the two parts of downtown) than automobile crossings.

Penn State Altoona has purchased several downtown buildings, including the former Playhouse Theater building, the six-story Penn Furniture building, and the former WRTA building. The university has turned them into the Devorris Downtown Center, the Aaron Building and the Kazmaier Family Building. Recently, Sheetz has added another building to Penn State Altoona called The Sheetz Center for Entrepreneurial Excellence on the former site of a department store behind the Amtrak Station. The university provides a flow of resources into the downtown, aiding in revitalization efforts. As an example of the university's value to the downtown's economy, the installation of the Blue Lot near the Wolf Court Building has improved the economic attraction of downtown by offering up to three hours of free parking. A bike path connecting the Campus to Downtown Altoona has also been built.

== Sports ==
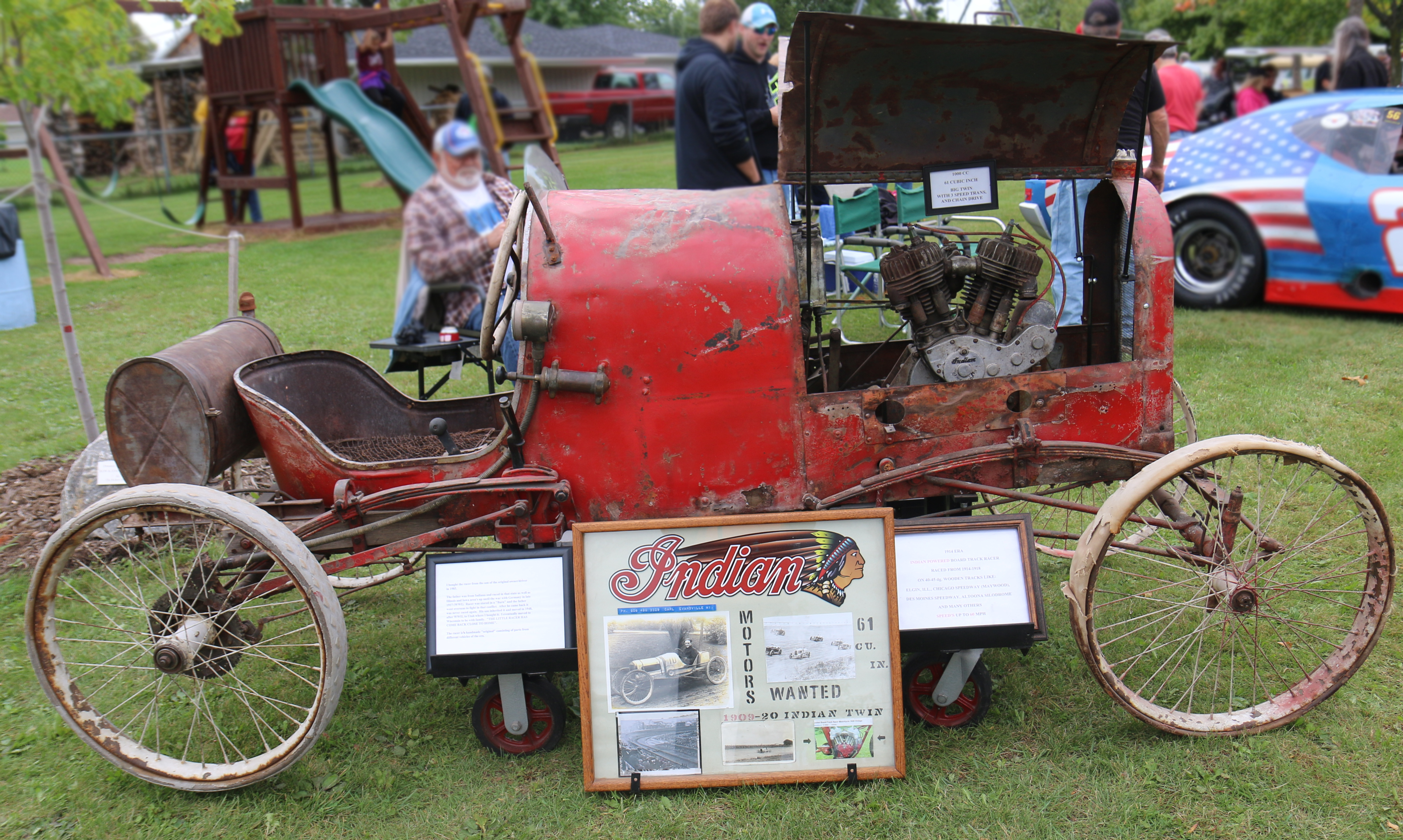
Car raced at Altoona's board track, Altoona Speedway

The city is home to the Altoona Curve, a Minor League Baseball franchise. The Curve began play in 1999 and are the Double-A affiliate of the Pittsburgh Pirates. The team plays in the Eastern League at Peoples Natural Gas Field.

The Altoona Mountain Citys were a Major League Baseball franchise that played in Altoona in 1884. They folded after 25 games with a 6–19 record.

In the early 20th century, the Pennsylvania Railroad constructed a large sports complex at the intersection of Chestnut Avenue and Seventh Street. It was named Cricket Field in an attempt to appeal to Cricket-loving British investors. Cricket did not catch on with the Altoona populace, so its close relative baseball became the choice for Cricket Field. Well known baseball players as Babe Ruth and Josh Gibson played at Cricket Field, and the stadium was also the venue for numerous other sporting events, musical competitions, marching units, and activities. A commercial plaza and the Pennsylvania State Parole & Probation stands today on the site of the former Cricket Field.

Altoona was the site of a 1.25-mile (2.01 km) board track called Altoona Speedway from 1923 to 1931. The track was the site of the fatal injuries of three Indianapolis 500 winners during the 1920s, claiming the lives of Howdy Wilcox (1919 winner) on September 4, 1923; Joe Boyer (1924 winner) on September 2, 1924; and Ray Keech (1929 winner) on June 15, 1929.

Altoona Area School District's Mansion Park Stadium fields sporting events for both its constituents schools, Bishop Guilfoyle High School and various amateur athletic district events. Mansion Park has also been the site of a 1992 Pittsburgh Steeler intrasquad scrimmage, the Pennsylvania State Athletic Conference men's and women's college soccer championships, University of Pittsburgh preseason football practices and the 1995 PIAA Soccer Championships. Musical events have included the Beach Boys, Up With People, the United States Marine Drum and Bugle Corps, the Penn State Blue Band, the Ohio State Pride of the Buckeyes Band, the University of Notre Dame Band of the Fighting Irish, the University of Illinois Marching Illini and the Indiana University of Pennsylvania Marching Band In early 2010, a new scoreboard featuring a video display board with an improved stadium sound system was erected thanks to the generosity of local sponsors.

== Education ==
=== Primary education ===
Altoona has three high schools, one public and two parochial.

The public school district for all of the city limits is the Altoona Area School District. Altoona Area High School houses grades 9–12. D.S. Keith Junior High and Theodore Roosevelt Junior High merged in 2008 to become the Altoona Area Junior High School. Roosevelt was torn down and the ground on which it stood was constructed into the new field for the new junior high. D. S. Keith was turned into residential apartments.

Roman Catholic Diocese of Altoona–Johnstown operates and/or sponsors area Catholic schools. Bishop Guilfoyle High School is one of the private parochial schools serving grades 9–12. Great Commission Schools is the second private parochial school having grades K–12.

Altoona High is much larger than Bishop Guilfoyle, graduating around 500 students annually, while Guilfoyle graduates around 70.

=== Colleges and universities ===
Altoona is the location of the Pennsylvania State University, Ivyside Park campus, also known as Penn State Altoona. This is the third largest of the Pennsylvania State University Commonwealth campuses. The college has approximately 3,903 students as of the 2014–15 school year.

Altoona also has several technical schools. The Greater Altoona Career and Technology Center (GACTC) is located on 16th Street next to the high school and offers a variety of technical classes for both Junior High and High School students throughout Blair County, as well as high school graduates seeking a technical degree. YTI Career Institute has a campus in Logan Hills on Fairway Drive. South Hills Business School has a campus located on 58th Street.

== Media ==
=== Movies ===
The character Harry Monk who was played by Glenn Ford in the 1964 movie Dear Heart comes from Altoona.

=== Newspapers ===
Altoona is served by the daily Altoona Mirror, which has been in print since 1874.

=== Television ===
The Altoona television market is part of the regional Johnstown/Altoona/State College market.

- WPSU (3.1 PBS, 3.2 Create, 3.3 World, 3.4 PBS Kids)
- WJAC (6.1 NBC, 6.2 MeTV, 6.3 Comet, 6.4 The CW Plus)
- WWCP (8.1 Fox, 8.2 WATM)
- WTAJ (10.1 CBS, 10.2 Court TV Mystery, 10.3 Laff, 10.4 Grit)
- WSCP-LP (13 Ind)
- WPKD-TV (19.1 CW)
- WATM (23.1 ABC HD, 23.2 WWCP-TV HD, 23.3 This TV, 23.4 ATV)
- WHVL-LP (29.1 MNTV, 29.2 Buzzr)
- W36BE-D (36.1 ABC, 36.2 ATV, 36.3 Justice)
- WKBS (47.1 COR)

=== Radio ===
FM stations
call letters	frequency	format	location	Owner
WHHN	88.1	Religious	Hollidaysburg	Radio Maria, Inc.
WRXV	89.1	Christian contemporary	State College	Invisible Allies Ministries
WUFR	91.1	Religious	Bedford	Family Radio
WJSM	92.7	Religious	Martinsburg	Martinsburg Broadcasting
WLKE	93.5	Christian Contemporary	Gallitzin	Educational Media Foundation
WBXQ	94.3	Classic Rock	Patton	Lightner Communications
WBRX	94.7	Adult contemporary	Cresson	Lightner Communications
WKMC	96.1	Classic Country	Altoona	Lightner Communications
WTRN	96.9	Easy Favorites	Altoona	Lightner Communications
WFGY	98.1	Country	Altoona	Seven Mountains Media
WRTA (AM)	98.5	News/Talk	Altoona	Lightner Communications
WTNA	99.7	Oldies	Altoona	Seven Mountains Media
WALY	100.1	Adult Contemporary	Altoona	Seven Mountains Media
WTRN	100.7	Easy Favorites	Tyrone	Lightner Communications
WRXV	102.7	Christian contemporary	Altoona	Invisibile Allies Ministries
WQWY	103.9	Classic Hits	Bellwood	Seven Mountains Media
WFBG	104.5	Hot Adult Contemporary	Altoona	Seven Mountains Media
WRKY-FM	104.9	Classic Rock	Hollidaysburg	Seven Mountains Media
WPSU-FM	106.7	Public Radio	Altoona	Pennsylvania State University
WYUP	107.7	Adult Hits	Altoona	Lightner Communications
WMES	107.7	Religious	Altoona	Lay Stewardship Educational Association

AM stations
call letters	frequency	format	location	Owner
WJSM	1110	Religious	Martinsburg	Martinsburg Broadcasting
WRTA (AM)	1240	News/Talk	Altoona	Lightner Communications
WFBG	1290	News/Talk	Altoona	Forever Media
WTRN	1340	Easy Favorites	Tyrone	Lightner Communications
WKMC	1370	Classic Country	Roaring Spring	Lightner Communications
WYUP	1400	Adult Hits	Loretto	Lightner Communications
WTNA	1430	Oldies	Altoona	Forever Media

== Infrastructure ==
=== Transportation ===
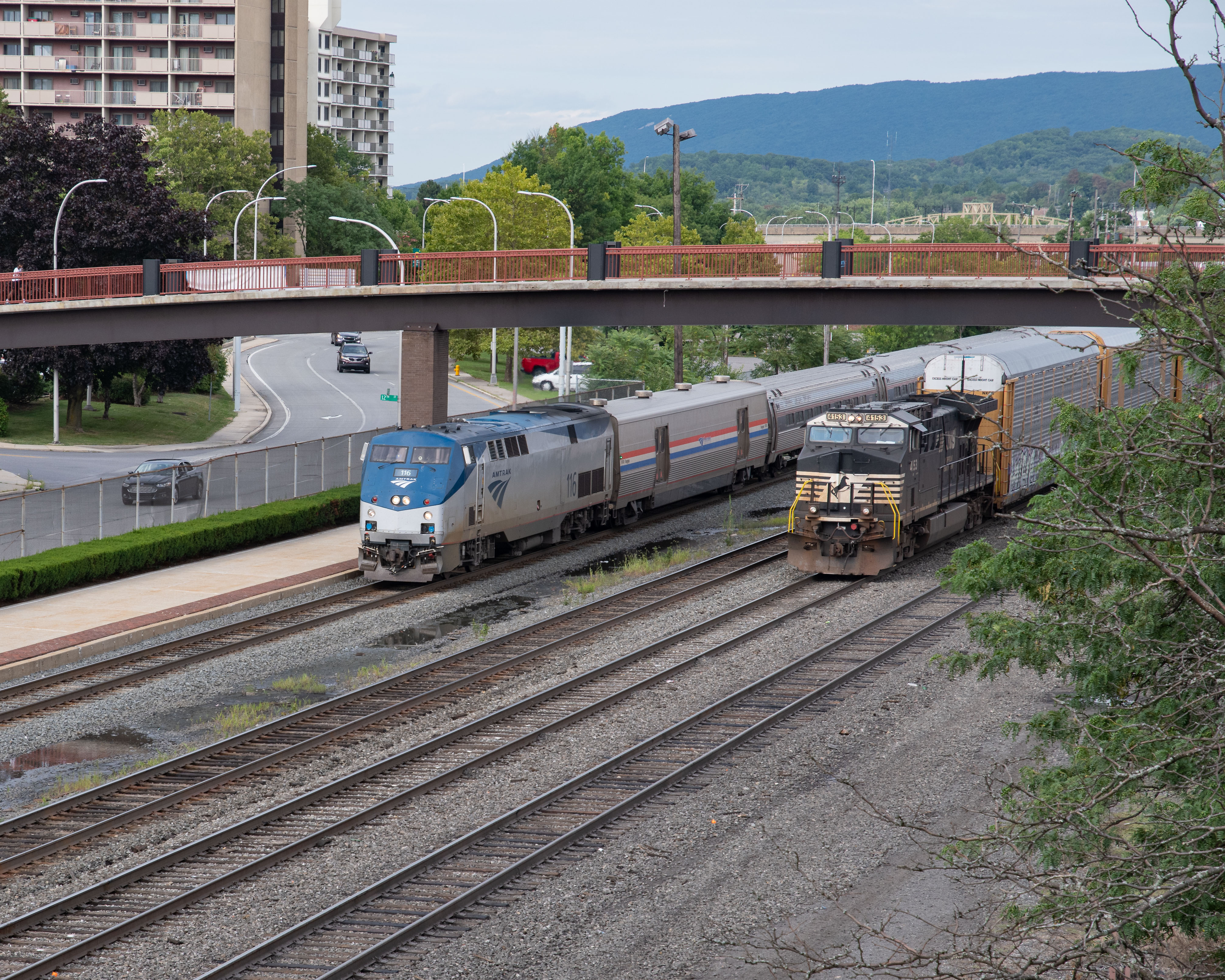
Amtrak's Pennsylvanian entering the Altoona Transportation Center as a Norfolk Southern Railway freight train passes through

Altoona is a major center on the Norfolk Southern Railway's (NS) Pittsburgh Line. In Altoona, helper engines are added to heavy trains to give them extra power up and over Horseshoe Curve west of town. The Juniata Heavy Repair Shop Complex, originally built by the Pennsylvania Railroad, is the primary repair and maintenance facility on NS. On an average day, 60 to 80 trains pass through Altoona. The historical importance to the railroad industry and the current high level of railroad activity has made Altoona a mecca for railfans for over 60 years, with the Railroaders Memorial Museum and the Horseshoe Curve being popular spots. Amtrak's Pennsylvanian stops at Altoona station once daily in each direction.

Local bus service in the city is provided by AMTRAN. In 2007, AMTRAN customers suffered a major loss in service due to cuts in state funding. In May of that year, Governor Rendell visited Altoona to discuss plans intended to rectify this situation.

Roadway service primarily consists of I-99, which provides access to the Pennsylvania Turnpike to the south and I-80 to the north; and US 22, which provides east–west service and direct access to Pittsburgh to the west and Harrisburg to the east. Local roadways in Altoona tend to be given numerical names, and Streets are aligned northwest–southeast and Avenues are aligned northeast–southwest.

The Altoona–Blair County Airport provides commercial air service for Altoona, offering daily flights to Charlotte Douglas International Airport.

=== City services ===
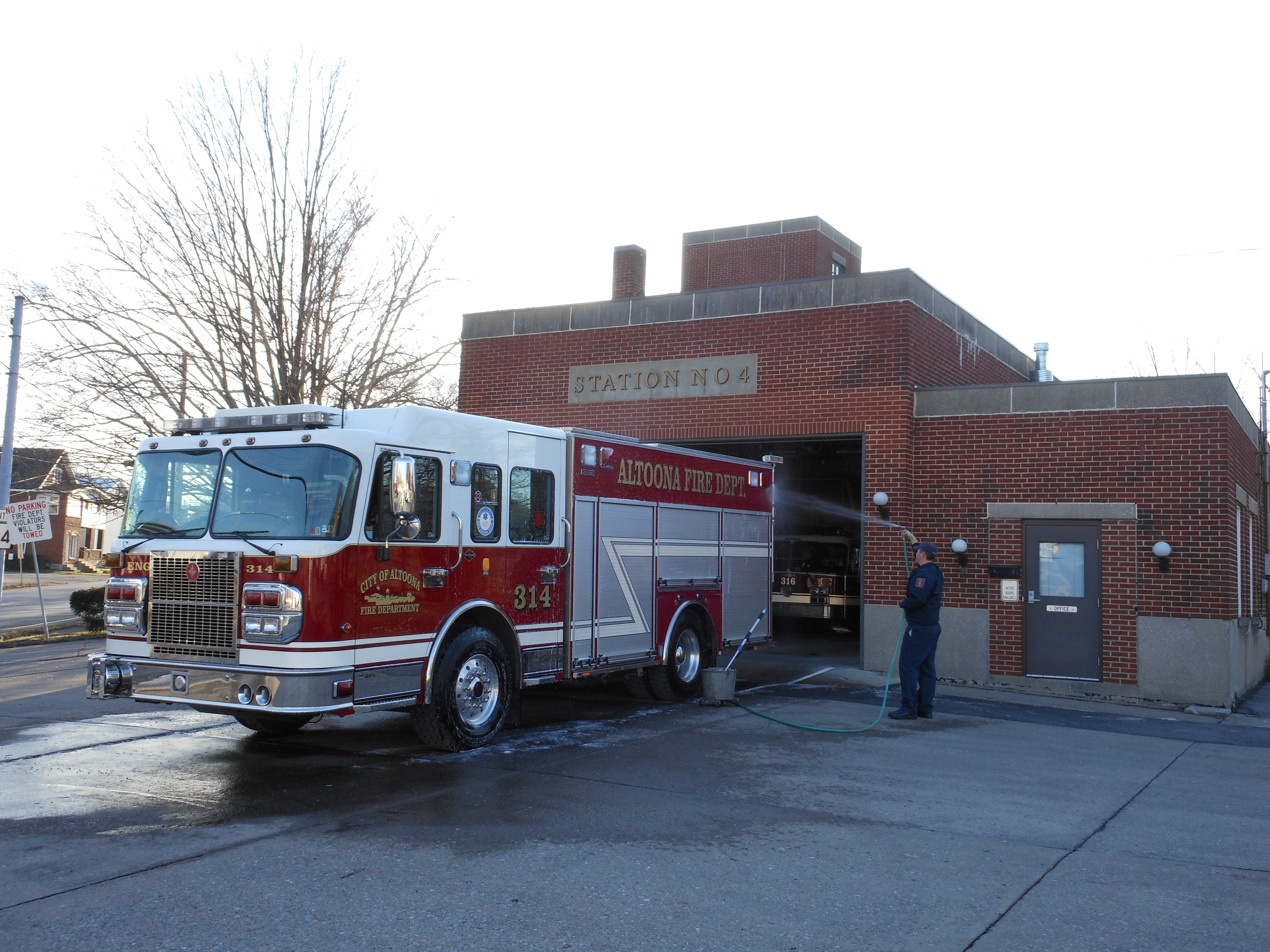
Altoona Fire Department Station 4 and Engine 314

Altoona and the Altoona Area are serviced by several companies for emergency services. Given that Altoona is entirely encompassed by Logan Township, and some small areas within the city are belonging to the Township, City and Township services often intermingle. Given the close proximity to Hollidaysburg and Duncansville Boroughs as well as Allegheny and Blair Townships, City, borough and township services will often assist or be called in place of each other.

The Altoona Police Department services the city. The department has about 66 employees and officers, and the precinct is located on 16th St downtown. The Logan Township Police Department services all areas of Logan Township. However, since the township encompasses the city, in order to be centrally located the precinct is in the city on 7th Avenue. The department has 16 members.

The Altoona Fire Department supplies fire and Quick Response Service to the city, as well as Haz-Mat response for Blair County. The department is also a part of the IAFF, local 299. There are also several Volunteer Companies located just outside the city limits on all sides.

AMED or the Altoona Mobile Emergency Department provides EMS services for both Altoona and Logan Township as well as many surrounding areas in Blair County including Bellwood, Tyrone, and Roaring Spring. AMED has several online and several offline ambulances on duty at the main station 430 on 7th Avenue and 10th Street as well as an additional online ambulance at 480 in Lakemont.

== Notable people ==
- John Ake, MLB player, Baltimore Orioles
- Harry J. Anslinger, first commissioner of the Federal Bureau of Narcotics
- Leonard Beerman, Reform rabbi and founder of Leo Baeck Temple, Los Angeles, California
- Michael Behe, professor of biochemistry and proponent of intelligent design
- Brad Benson, professional football player, New York Giants
- Troy Benson, professional football player, New York Jets
- Andrew Jackson Bettwy, mayor of Nogales, Arizona
- Janet Blair, actress, star of such films as My Sister Eileen (1942) and I Love Trouble (1948)
- Arthur Blake, actor and female impersonator
- Ron Blazier, baseball player, Philadelphia Phillies
- Rob Boston, author and advocate of church-state separation
- Paul Revere Braniff, aviation entrepreneur and co-founder of Braniff International Airways
- Samuel Canan, 34th Governor of American Samoa
- Susan Candiotti, journalist and national correspondent for CNN
- Sam Cohn, New York talent agent
- Ripper Collins, professional baseball player, member of the Gashouse Gang
- Charlie Crist, former U.S. congressman and 44th Governor of Florida
- Paul C. Donnelly, NASA manager
- John Ebersole, professional football player, New York Jets
- Ed Flanagan, NFL player for Detroit Lions and San Diego Chargers, four-time NFL Pro Bowl selection
- Danny Fortson, professional basketball player, Seattle SuperSonics
- Frank Gansz, NFL football coach, Kansas City Chiefs
- Richard Geist, politician in the Pennsylvania House of Representatives (1979–2013)
- Aaron Gilbert, painter
- Kevin Givens, professional football player, San Francisco 49ers
- John Gochnaur, MLB player for Brooklyn Superbas and Cleveland Broncos/Naps
- Hope Hibbard, zoology professor, marine biology researcher
- Hedda Hopper, gossip columnist and actress, buried in Rose Hill Cemetery, Altoona
- Georgette Ioup, linguist and professor of English at the University of New Orleans (1985–2007)
- Tommy Irwin, MLB player, Cleveland Indians
- Mike Iuzzolino, NBA player, Dallas Mavericks
- Edwin A. Jaggard, Justice of the Minnesota Supreme Court (1905–1911)
- Richard T. James, inventor of the Slinky
- Stan Jones, professional football player and coach, Pro Football Hall of Famer (inducted 1991)
- John Joyce, politician in the U.S. House of Representatives (2019–present)
- Robert Jubelirer, politician in the Pennsylvania State Senate (1975–2006)
- Theodore H. Kattouf, U.S. ambassador to Syria and the United Arab Emirates
- Henry Kloss, audio engineer and entrepreneur, Consumer Electronics Association's Hall of Famer (inducted 2000)
- Robert E. Laws, Medal of Honor recipient, World War II
- Cindy Lovell, educator and writer, known for her work in support of Mark Twain's legacy
- James Loy, Deputy Secretary of the U.S. Department of Homeland Security
- Pat Malone, MLB pitcher for Chicago Cubs and New York Yankees, three-time World Series selection
- David Mahaffey, Eastern Orthodox priest and former Bishop of Sitka and Alaska (2014–2020)
- Barry McCauley, opera singer
- John J. McGuire, science-fiction writer
- Eli Mencer, former professional football player, Seattle Seahawks
- Kelly M. Miller, academic and 11th President of Texas A&M University–Corpus Christi
- Johnny Moore, NBA player for Texas Longhorns and San Antonio Spurs
- William Nesbit, abolitionist and 1st President of the Pennsylvania State Equal Rights League Convention
- Jackie Paisley, IFBB professional bodybuilder
- John Pielmeier, playwright and screenwriter
- H. Beam Piper, author of the Fuzzy and Paratime novel series
- Frank Raab, ariel flying ring and artistic gymnast
- Mike Reid, musician and songwriter; retired football player
- Darlie Routier, convicted murderer
- Wade Schalles, all-time record holder for most pins and most wins in amateur wrestling
- Gertrude Woodcock Seibert, religious authoress and member of the International Bible Students Association
- Louis Schmitt Jr., politician in the Pennsylvania House of Representatives (2018–2025), Judge of the Court of Common Pleas for the 24th Judicial District (Blair County) (2026-present)
- Bob Sheetz, founder of the Sheetz convenience store chain
- D. Brooks Smith, Senior Judge of the U.S. Court of Appeals for the Third Circuit (2021–present)
- Harry E. Soyster, retired Lieutenant General of the U.S. Army (1957–1991)
- John A. Stormer, Independent Baptist minister and anti-communist author
- Steve Taneyhill, former football player and coach, South Carolina Gamecocks
- Andrew Kevin Walker, screenwriter for the award-winning films Seven (1995), 8mm (1999), and Sleepy Hollow (1999)
- Doug West, NBA player for Minnesota Timberwolves and Philadelphia 76ers
- Paul Winter, jazz saxophonist and composer, considered to be a pioneer of world music
- Alfie Wise, film and television actor

== International relations ==
=== Twin towns/sister cities ===
Altoona is twinned with the following city:

- St. Pölten, Niederösterreich, Austria

== See also ==
- Altoona–Blair County Airport
- Altoona-style pizza
- Killing of Brian Thompson
- Georgism
- Mishler Theatre
- Penn Alto Building
- Railroaders Memorial Museum
- War Governors' Conference
