= Altoona-style pizza =

Style of pizza created in Pennsylvania, United States

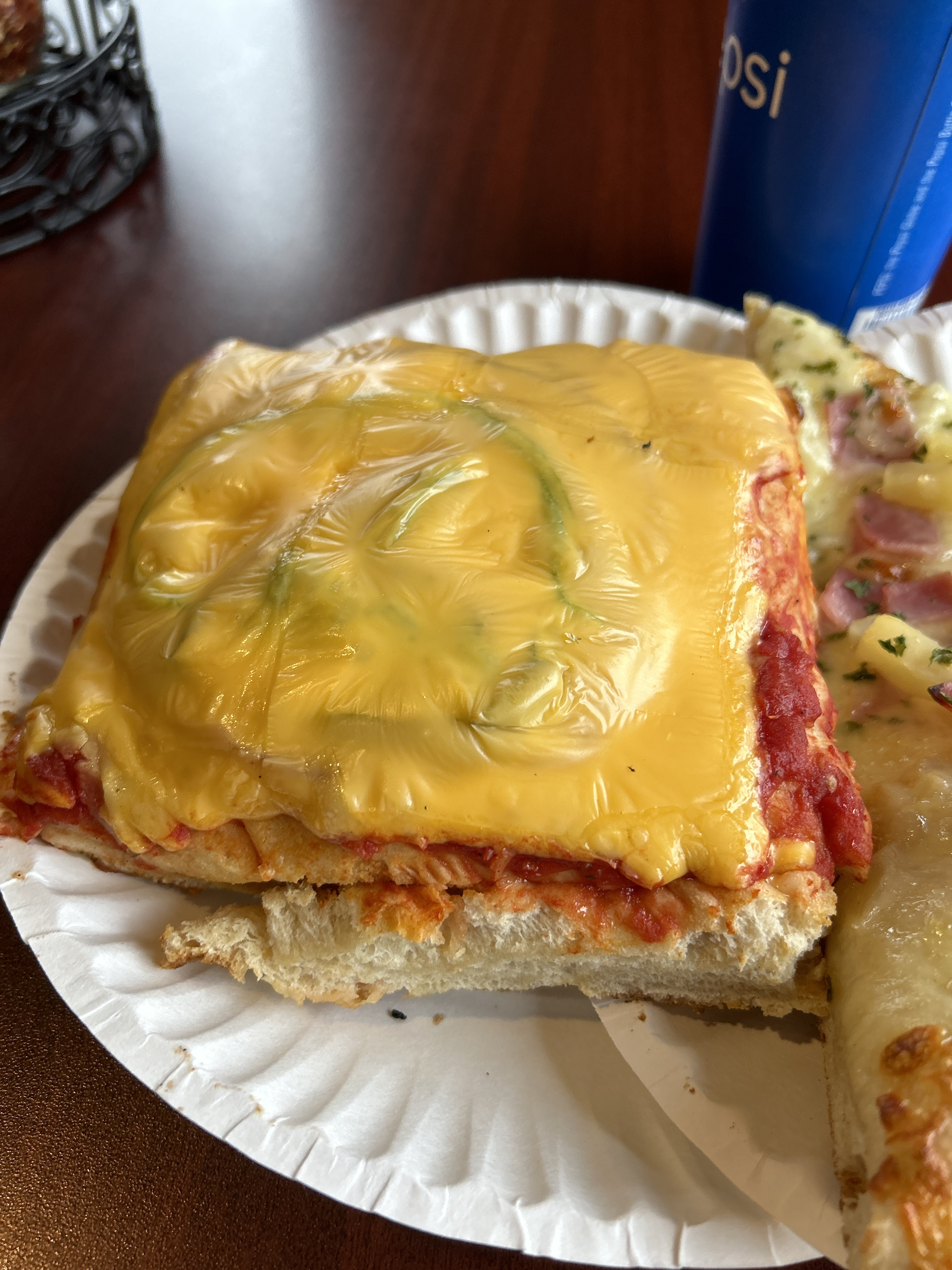
- A slice of Altoona-style pizza
- Type: Pizza
- Place of origin: United States
- Region or state: Altoona, Pennsylvania
- Main ingredients: Sicilian-style pizza dough, tomato sauce, sliced green bell pepper, salami, American cheese

Altoona-style pizza is a distinct type of pizza created in the city of Altoona, Pennsylvania, United States, by the Altoona Hotel. The definitive characteristics of Altoona-style pizza are a Sicilian-style pizza dough, tomato sauce, sliced green bell pepper, salami, a topping of American cheese and pizzas cut into squares instead of wedges.

== Characteristics and preparation ==
=== Crust ===
The crust is made of a Sicilian-style pizza dough, giving it a thick and soft crust. Instead of larger wedges, which is typical of many pizza styles, Altoona Hotel pizza is typically cut into squares.

=== Cheese ===
While originally topped with Velveeta, Altoona-style pizza is popularly topped with yellow processed cheese known as American cheese. The yellow squares of American cheese are a staple of this dish, used instead of the mozzarella or provolone common to other styles of pizza.

=== Toppings ===
The traditional toppings included on a slice of Altoona-style pizza are a sliced green bell pepper and cooked deli style salami with peppercorns, notable for being underneath the pizza's cheese topping.

== History ==
Altoona-style pizza originated at the Altoona Hotel in the 1950s. The hotel was noted as serving "a unique pizza" in 1996 by the Pittsburgh Post-Gazette. Following the destruction of the hotel in 2013 by fire, other local restaurants began serving Altoona-style pizza.

== See also ==
- American cheese
- Cuisine of the Mid-Atlantic states
