= Gertrude Woodcock Seibert =

American writer (1864–1928)

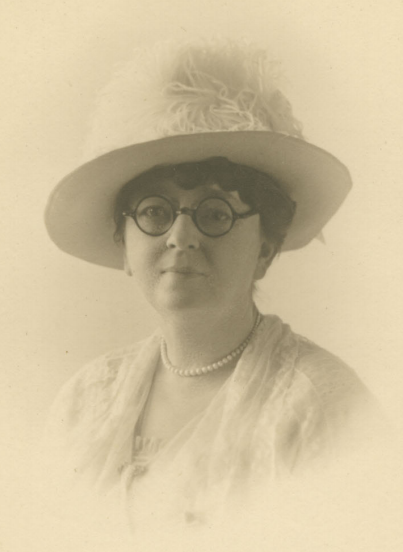
- Born: Gertrude Antonette Woodcock; November 16, 1864; Altoona, Pennsylvania
- Died: June 13, 1928 (aged 63); Miami Beach, Florida
- Education: Wellesley College
- Occupations: writer; compiler
- Spouse: Robert S. Seibert (m. 1890)
- Writing career
- Pen name: Gertrude W. Seibert; G. W. Seibert
- Language: English
- Genres: poetry; religion

Gertrude Woodcock Seibert (November 16, 1864 – June 13, 1928) was an American writer. Initially known for her poetry, she became a compiler of religious texts.

== Biography ==
Gertrude Antonette (or "Antoinette") Woodcock was born in Altoona, Pennsylvania on November 16, 1864. Her parents were Samuel M. Woodcock, a lawyer, and Elizabeth (Etnier) Woodcock.

She graduated from Altoona High School (1880) and Wellesley College (B.S., 1885).

On September 18, 1890, in Altoona, she married Robert Samuel Seibert. He later became president of East Broad Top Railroad, Rockhill Iron and Coal Company, and Shade Gap Railroad Company.

Since 1894, Seibert was engaged in non-denominational Bible study and private lectures on religious topics. After joining the Bible Students, she compiled Daily Heavenly Manna for the Household of Faith in 1905, also translating it into German, Swedish, and Norwegian, and Instructor's Guide and Berean Topical Index for the Berean Bible in 1907.

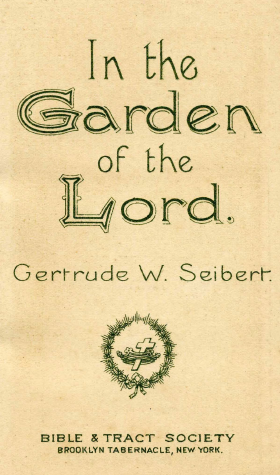
In the Garden of the Lord

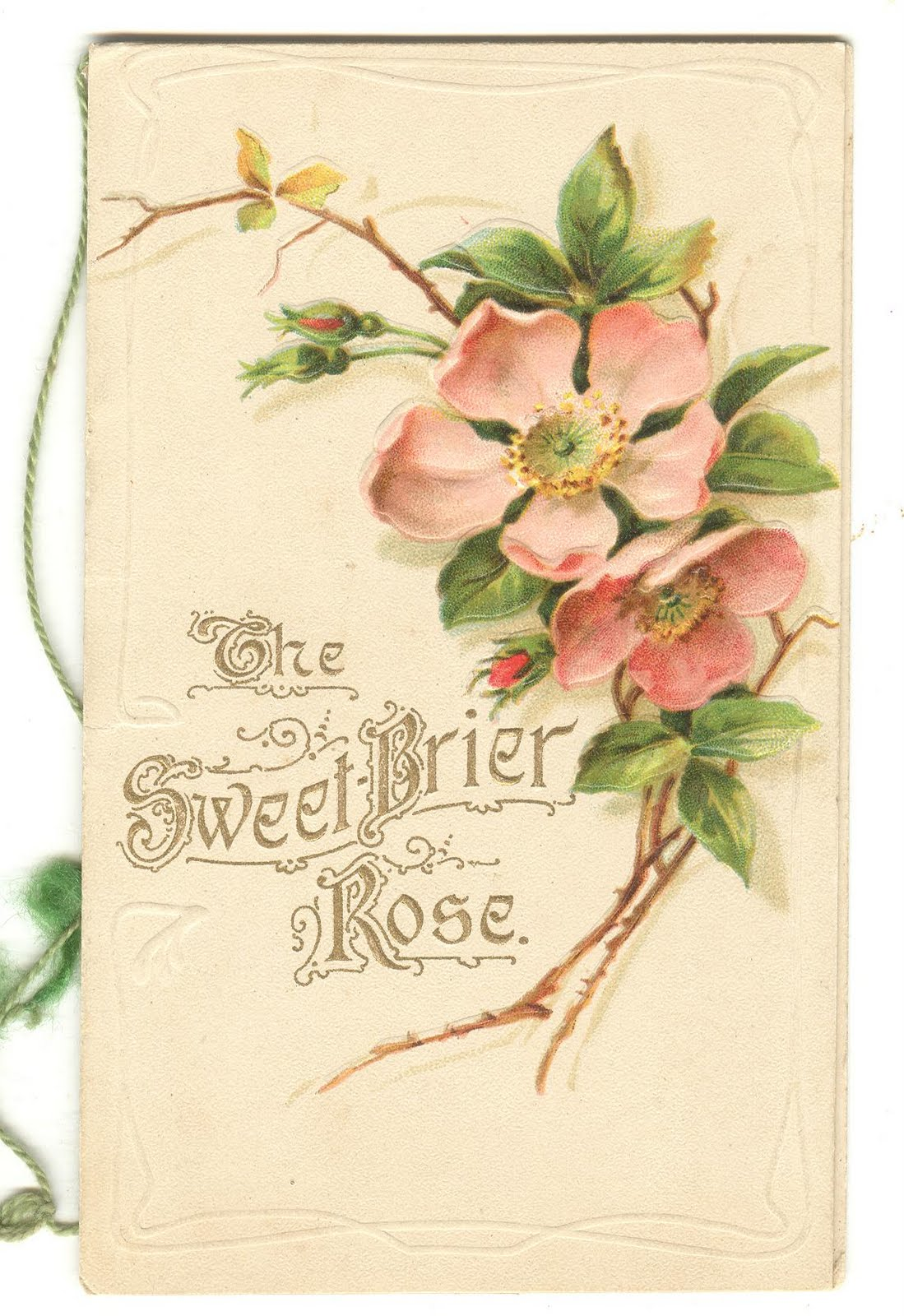
Sweet Brier Rose

Seibert contributed to various newspapers (religious articles exclusively) and wrote religious poems and hymns. In 1909, she published the booklet Sweet Brier Rose (500,000 printed). In 1912, she compiled Poems of Dawn. She also published the booklet In the Garden of the Lord (in illustrated form). Seibert did considerable art work in the line of decorated and illustrated motto cards; a 1905 design of chestnut burrs, illustrating "In Due Time", was printed in an edition of 15,000.

Seibert was also an active member of the International Bible Students Association. She was opposed to woman suffrage on Scriptural grounds.

Gertrude Seibert died on June 13, 1928, at Miami Beach, Florida.

== Selected works ==
- Berean Bible Teachers' Manual, 1909
- In the Garden of the Lord, 1913
- Daily Heavenly Manna for the Household of Faith, 1905, revised 1907
- Niebiańska manna czyli rozmyślania duchowe na każdy dzień roku dla domowników wiary, 1907
- Sweet Brier Rose, 1909
- Daglig himmelsk manna for troens husstand, 1911
- Poems of Dawn, 1912, revised 1915
