= WRTA (AM) =

- Altoona, Pennsylvania; United States
- Broadcast area: Altoona, Pennsylvania; Blair County, Pennsylvania
- Frequency: 1240 kHz
- Branding: "Talk Radio 98.5 & 1240 WRTA"

Programming
- Format: News/talk
- Affiliations: Fox News Radio; Accuweather; Compass Media Networks; Premiere Networks; Westwood One; Altoona Curve

Ownership
- Owner: Matthew W. Lightner; (Lightner Communications LLC)
- Sister stations: WBRX; WBXQ; WKMC; WTRN; WYUP

History
- First air date: 1946
- Call sign meaning: Roy Thompson Altoona

Technical information
- Licensing authority: FCC
- Facility ID: 67505
- Class: C
- Power: 1,000 watts unlimited
- Transmitter coordinates: 40°30′26.3″N 78°25′14″W
- Translator: 98.5 W253CJ (Altoona)

Links
- Public license information: Public file; LMS
- Webcast: Listen live
- Website: www.lightnercommunications.com/wrta-2/

WRTA (1240 kHz) is a news/talk formatted broadcast radio station licensed to Altoona, Pennsylvania, serving Altoona and Blair County, Pennsylvania. WRTA is owned and operated by Matt Lightner, through licensee Lightner Communications LLC.

== History ==
WRTA began broadcasting June 18, 1947, on 1240 kHz with 250 watts of power. The station was an ABC affiliate and was owned by Roy Thompson.

Roy Thompson sold WRTA to the Altoona Trans Audio Corporation in March 1956. The Altoona Trans Audio Corporation was composed of Martin J. Malarkey Jr., John L. Miller, Horace Richards, and Louis "Lou" Murray. In September 1982, the Altoona Trans Audio Corporation elected David Rodney "Rod" Wolf President and Chief Operating Officer. Wolf still maintained his positions as Treasurer and General Manager. Rod Wolf joined WRTA in January 1957 where he served in multiple capacities on and off the air.

Rod Wolf, President of Altoona Trans Audio, announced the sale of WRTA to David A. Barger, president of Handsome Brothers Inc., in November 2003. The sale marked the first change in ownership of WRTA in more than 45 years. Rebecca Barger sold the station to Lightner Communications, LLC (Matt Lightner) in July 2019, joining it with stations WKMC, WYUP, WBRX, WBXQ and WTRN. Matt Lightner is a long time Broadcast Engineer and area business owner. The sale was consummated on October 1, 2019, at a price of $675,000.

WRTA added an FM translator at 98.5 MHz (W253CJ) that provides city grade FM coverage of Altoona and coverage in all of Blair County, and part of Cambria County.
