= Edwin A. Jaggard =

American judge

Jaggard c. 1899

Edwin Ames Jaggard (June 21, 1859 – February 13, 1911) was an American jurist.

Born in Altoona, Pennsylvania, Jaggard received his bachelor's degree from Dickinson College in 1879. He then received his law degree from University of Pennsylvania Law School in 1882. He then moved to Saint Paul, Minnesota, in 1882, and practiced law. Jaggard served as Minnesota District Court judge, from 1898 until 1905, for Ramsey County, Minnesota. He was a lecturer at the University of Minnesota Law School. Jaggard served on the Minnesota Supreme Court from 1905 until his death in 1911. Jaggard died in Bermuda of a heart attack where he had gone for his health.
