= Downtown Altoona Historic District =

Historic district in Pennsylvania, United States

- U.S. National Register of Historic Places
- U.S. Historic district
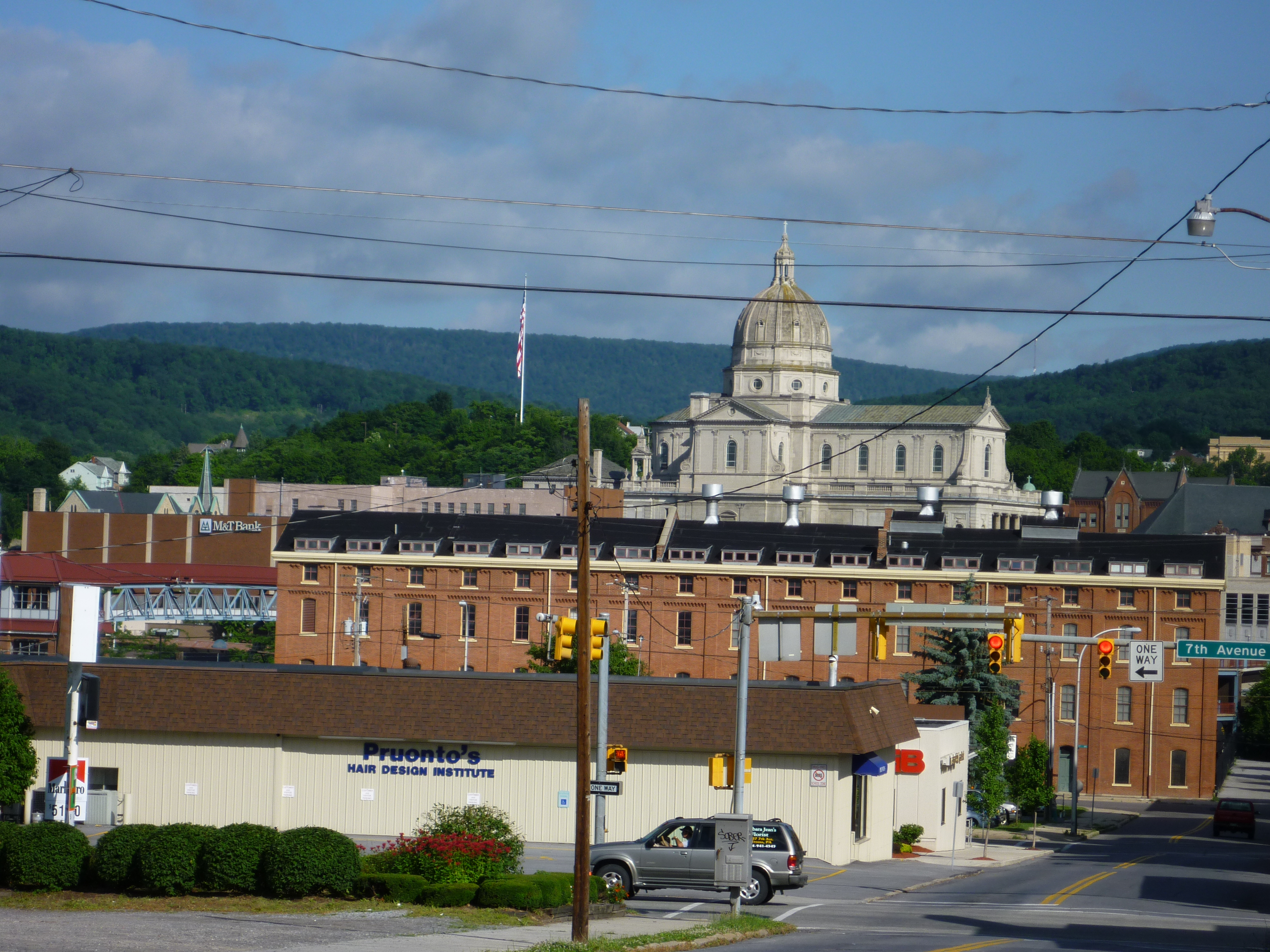

- Location within Pennsylvania Location within the United States
- Location: Roughly bounded by 11th Avenue, 11th Street, 15th Avenue and 13th Street, also 700–1000 Lexington and 900–1000 Howard Avenues, Altoona, Pennsylvania
- Coordinates: 40°31′8″N 78°24′4″W
- Area: 48.9 acres (19.8 ha)
- Built: 1868
- Architect: Multiple, including D. George Puderbaugh, Charles M. Robinson
- Architectural style: Late 19th And 20th Century Revivals, Late Victorian, Early Commercial, Late Gothic Revival
- NRHP reference No.: 92000946, 04000885 (Boundary Increase)
- Added to NRHP: July 24, 1992, August 20, 2004 (Boundary Increase)

Downtown Altoona Historic District is a national historic district located at Altoona, Blair County, Pennsylvania. The district includes 240 contributing buildings in the central business district and surrounding residential areas of Altoona. The buildings were primarily built after about 1860 and include residential, civic, social, and religious buildings. Although it does not encompass the entire downtown, it is for the most part the most urban part of Altoona's downtown district (whose boundaries are not very neatly defined anyway). Notable buildings include the Cathedral of the Blessed Sacrament (1920s), First Methodist Episcopal Church, First Presbyterian Church, First Evangelical Lutheran Church (1896-1897), U.S. Post Office (1931-1933), Fraternal Order of Eagles Building (demolished), Altoona City Hall, Casanave Building (1890s), Hutchison Block, McCrory's Department Store (1937), and Aaron-Penn Furniture Building. Located in the district are the separately listed Central Trust Company Buildings, Mishler Theatre, and Penn Alto Hotel.

It was added to the National Register of Historic Places in 1992, with a boundary increase in 2004.
