= WKMC =

Coordinates: 40°19′26″N 78°23′40″W

- Roaring Spring, Pennsylvania; United States
- Broadcast area: Altoona, Pennsylvania
- Frequency: 1370 kHz
- Branding: 96.1 Hank FM

Programming
- Format: Classic country
- Affiliations: Pittsburgh Penguins Radio Network

Ownership
- Owner: Matthew W. Lightner; (Lightner Communications LLC)
- Sister stations: WRTA, WYUP, WTRN, WBRX, WBXQ

History
- First air date: July 21, 1955

Technical information
- Licensing authority: FCC
- Facility ID: 72315
- Class: D
- Power: 5,000 watts day 38 watts night
- Translator: 96.1 W241CQ (Altoona)

Links
- Public license information: Public file; LMS
- Webcast: Listen Live
- Website: WKMC Online

WKMC (1370 AM) is a classic country radio station broadcasting in Altoona, Pennsylvania. It is licensed to the community of Roaring Spring, Pennsylvania, located approximately 12 miles southeast of Altoona.

WKMC operates at the assigned power levels of 5,000 watts during the day, and 38 watts at night. WKMC uses a two-tower directional antenna system.

WKMC also operates an FM translator (W241CQ) at 96.1 MHz with city grade coverage of Altoona, PA and regular coverage in the rest of Blair County and part of Cambria County.

== History ==
WKMC was issued a construction permit on February 17, 1954; about seven months after the application to build it was first submitted. The station was first licensed to Martinsburg, Pennsylvania. Carl W. Kensinger and Robert E. Meredith applied for the permit, doing business as Cove Broadcasting Company, Incorporated. The station first operated at a non-directional power of 500 watts, daytime only. On July 21, 1955, WKMC first signed on the air from its studios, office and transmitter facility at 1345 South Main Street Extension in Roaring Spring.

In March 1956, Cove Broadcasting Company applied for a construction permit to double WKMC's power and replace its transmitter. The FCC granted the request on July 2 that same year to allow the station to run at a thousand watts of power, but retained its daytime-only status.

On January 14, 1959, Cove Broadcasting Company agreed to sell the station to Melvin, Amos, Marion and Boyd Shaw, a family ownership group that kept the Cove Broadcasting name. The FCC approved the sale on February 11, 1959. In July 1966, the Shaw family agreed to sell the station to Fort Bedford Enterprises, Inc. The FCC approved that sale the following month, and again the Cove Broadcasting name was retained.

In October 1967, the FCC granted WKMC permission for pre-sunrise authority, which allowed it to sign on no earlier than 6am year-round, at a power of 500 watts. It was still required to sign off at local sunset. Two years later, Fort Bedford Enterprises agreed to sell the station to Louis J. Maierhofer.

On August 31, 1977, WKMC was granted permission to increase its power to its present level, and adopt a directional antenna pattern. The following year, WKMC was joined by an FM sister, WHPA, (now WRKY-FM) licensed to Hollidaysburg. That station signed on December 1, 1978.

On July 8, 1980, WKMC applied to the FCC to change its community of license from Martinsburg to Roaring Spring, but keeping Martinsburg as a second city in its station identification, and no change in licensed transmitter facilities. The FCC approved the application on December 12, 1980.

On November 1, 1988, WKMC and WHPA were sold to WHPA/WKMC Inc., a company headed by David G. Mitchell, thus ending more than three decades of the licensee being in the hands of Cove Broadcasting, though ownership principals had changed over the years. Concurrently with the change in ownership, WKMC was permitted to operate with limited nighttime power after the FCC permitted Regional Class III stations to adopt nighttime authorization in the late 80s.

In 1997, both stations were spun off to separate owners. WKMC was sold to Allegheny Mountain Network of Tyrone, a company headed by Cary H. Simpson, and WHPA was sold to Altoona-based Forever Broadcasting. On May 1, 2005, WKMC was sold to David Barger Handsome Brothers, Inc.

Former logo

In July 2019, WKMC, sister stations WRTA, WBRX, and WBXQ, and two translators were sold to Lightner Communications, LLC (Matt Lightner), owners of WTRN and WYUP. Matt Lightner is a longtime broadcast engineer and area business owner. The sale closed on October 1, 2019, at a price of $675,000.

On July 20, 2020, WKMC changed their format from classic hits to classic country, branded as "96.1 Hank FM".
