= WJSM =

WJSM & WJSM-FM
- United States
- Broadcast area: Altoona, Pennsylvania
- Frequency: See § Stations

Programming
- Format: Christian

Ownership
- Owner: Martinsburg Broadcasting, Inc.

Technical information
- Licensing authority: FCC

Links
- Public license information: & WJSM-FM Public file; LMS
- Website: www.wjsm.com

WJSM is a religious radio station serving the Altoona, Pennsylvania market, known as Victory Radio. The radio station is an outlet for evangelists such as Dr. James Dobson and others.

== History ==
WJSM Radio had its start many years ago by a man with a dream of providing South Central Pennsylvania to have its own Christian radio station. He was Kenneth W. Ferry of Martinsburg, who owned a trucking firm, and while driving heard a western Centre County-based Christian Station, WPHB in Philipsburg, founded by Reverend William Emert. That station programs country music and talk programming today, with religious programming reserved for Sundays.

Inspired by the experience, Ferry thought that the Martinsburg area needed a station like that and began by filing an application for an AM station in the early 1960s. After several applications and amendments to those applications, the FCC granted a construction permit for an FM station instead. WJSM-FM pioneered FM Christian Broadcasting with its first regular scheduled broadcast on April 19, 1965. It was a challenge indeed, as back in the 1960s, FM broadcast frequencies were virtually unknown or hardly used and fewer people yet had home FM receivers, and even fewer people had FM compatible radios in their vehicles. WJSM finally came on the air on February 27, 1968, finally meeting the need of the majority of the station's audience in these pre-FM radio years. A daytime-only station, WJSM was required to sign off at sunset, but WJSM-FM continued to broadcast during the evening hours. The FM band finally became more popular by the early 1980s, and listenership grew.

The WJSM studios were first located adjacent to the founders' home in North Woodbury Township, Blair County.

The Ferry family owned the stations for 10 years. They were sold in 1975 to two part-time employees interested in seeing Christian Radio remain in South Central Pennsylvania. They were Sherwood B. Hawley of Bedford and Larry S. Walters of Hollidaysburg. Mr. Ferry died shortly after the stations were sold. WJSM was one of the first 20 stations nationwide to broadcast the "Focus on the Family" program founded by Dr. James Dobson in 1977. The program started as a 25-minute weekly broadcast, and is today heard weekdays in a 30-minute format.

WJSM operated from a small 3-room apartment on South Locust Street in Martinsburg from 1976 until 1982. Offices and studios were then moved adjacent to the home of one of the owners, Larry Walters, approximately three miles east of Martinsburg.

The stations pioneered the use of satellite delivered programs by joining the Satellite Radio Network in the early 1980s. The network delivered programs via satellite instead of on reel to reel tapes, a move that was ahead of its time and folded later, though satellite technology is a major source of programming for most Christian Radio stations today.

WJSM-FM brought the first 24-hour-a-day Christian programming to the region in the early 1980s. There were no Christian stations broadcasting during the nighttime hours at that point in time.

== Sale to Martinsburg Broadcasting ==
The WJSM Stations were sold in 1989 to Martinsburg Broadcasting, Inc. from Sherwood Hawley and Larry Walters. Larry Walters was the President of the corporation, and remains as its President to date. Sherwood died on July 27, 1993. In 1994, the WJSM Broadcast Center was constructed along Rebecca Furnace Road in Huston Township, just outside Martinsburg. The Broadcast Center houses the WJSM main studio, two full production studios, an engineering department, an audio library, offices, with a conference and meeting room on the lower level.

== Stations ==
Call sign	Frequency	City of license	Facility ID	Power W	ERP W	Height m (ft)	Class	Transmitter coordinates	First air date	Call sign meaning
WJSM	1110 AM	Martinsburg, Pennsylvania	40504	1,000 (daytime)			D	40°18′14″N 78°15′59″W	February 27, 1968	Wonderful Jesus Saves Master
WJSM-FM	92.7 FM	Martinsburg, Pennsylvania	40503		1,900	180 m (590 ft)	A	40°20′50″N 78°24′57″W	April 19, 1965	Wonderful Jesus Saves Master

== Bibliography ==
- Official website
- Facility details for Facility ID 40504 (WJSM) in the FCC Licensing and Management System
- WJSM in Nielsen Audio's AM station database
- "History Cards for WJSM". Federal Communications Commission. (Guide to reading History Cards)
- Facility details for Facility ID 40503 (WJSM-FM) in the FCC Licensing and Management System
- WJSM-FM in Nielsen Audio's FM station database
