= Susan Candiotti =

American journalist

Susan Jo Candiotti (born December 6, 1953) is an American journalist currently working as a national correspondent for CNN.

== Education ==
Candiotti attended Loyola University Chicago, studying abroad at Loyola University Chicago's John Felice Rome Center for a year before graduating with honors.

== Career ==
=== Local news ===
She worked as an investigative reporter at local stations in Miami, where her assignments included the Iran-Contra affair. Candiotti has also worked for television stations in Buffalo, N.Y., Binghamton, N.Y., and Altoona, Pennsylvania.

=== National news ===
Candiotti joined CNN in 1994 as a national correspondent out of the network's Miami base. She has covered several prominent national stories, including the 9/11 attacks in New York City, the 1999-2000 Elian Gonzalez story, the 1999 James Byrd dragging-death trial in Jasper, Texas, the 1998 fatal Capitol shooting rampage in Washington, D.C., and the Oklahoma City bombing and subsequent trials of convicted co-conspirators Timothy McVeigh and Terry Nichols. She also interviewed McVeigh from prison and covered his execution in 2001.

Candiotti also has covered breaking news stories in Colombia, the Dominican Republic, the Caribbean, Cuba, Mexico, Haiti and Peru. She covered the 1996 Tupac Amaru hostage situation at the Japanese Embassy in Peru. In Haiti, Candiotti spent months covering the crisis preceding and following Jean-Bertrand Aristide's return from exile. She was the first reporter to file live ship-to-shore reports from the U.S. Coast Guard cutters when thousands of Cuban refugees fled Cuba on homemade rafts in 1994. Additionally, in early 1998, she traveled with U.S. troops to Kuwait.

She also spent more than two months in Montana following the standoff between Freeman and the FBI in 1996. While in Montana, she also covered the extradition of accused Unabomber Theodore Kaczynski. In 1996, Candiotti covered the Valujet Flight 592 crash in the Florida Everglades, the 1996 TWA Flight 800 crash and the 2000 EgyptAir Flight 990 tragedy.

In 2008, she reported live during Hurricane Gustav (during one incident, she mentioned her cell phone number over a live satellite feed which was not on television at the time, but could be seen by viewers with a satellite dish).

On December 14, 2012, at approximately 2:15 p.m., Candiotti stood outside the Sandy Hook Elementary School in Newtown, Connecticut, and reported that the shooter in the Sandy Hook Elementary School shooting had been identified to her by a source as Ryan Lanza. She did not confirm or verify this information before the live broadcast. The name of the actual shooter was later revealed to be Adam Lanza, the younger brother of Ryan Lanza.
