= KTSN =

KTSN may refer to:

- KTSN (AM), a radio station (1060 AM) licensed to serve Lockhart, Texas, United States
- KTSN-FM, a radio station (88.9 FM) licensed to serve Blowout, Texas; see List of radio stations in Texas
- KJFK (AM), a radio station (1490 AM) licensed to serve Austin, Texas, which held the KTSN call sign from 2017 to 2022
- KTSN (Nevada), a defunct radio station (1340 AM) formerly licensed to serve Elko, Nevada, United States
