= KTSN (Nevada) =

Elko, Nevada; United States
- Frequency: 1340 kHz

Programming
- Format: Defunct (formerly talk radio)
- Affiliations: ABC Radio, Westwood One, Premiere Radio Networks, ESPN Radio

Ownership
- Owner: Northern Nevada Media, Inc.
- Sister stations: KRJC, KELY, KWNA

History
- First air date: June 21, 1996
- Last air date: April 6, 2015

Technical information
- Facility ID: 77542
- Class: C
- Power: 1,000 watts unlimited
- Transmitter coordinates: 40°51′56″N 115°43′9″W

KTSN (1340 AM) was a radio station broadcasting a talk radio format. Licensed to Elko, Nevada, United States, the station was owned by Northern Nevada Media, Inc.

Northern Nevada Media surrendered KTSN's license to the Federal Communications Commission (FCC) on April 6, 2015; the FCC cancelled the license on April 9, 2015.
