= KWNA =

KWNA may refer to:

- KWNA-FM, a radio station (92.7 FM) licensed to serve Winnemucca, Nevada, United States
- KWNA (AM), a defunct radio station (1400 AM) formerly licensed to serve Winnemucca, Nevada, which held the call sign KWNA from 1955 to 2019
