= KZBI =

KZBI may refer to:

- KZBI (FM), a radio station (92.9 FM) licensed to serve Marlin, Texas, United States
- KUOL (FM), a radio station (94.5 FM) licensed to serve Elko, Nevada, United States, which held the call sign KZBI from 2010 to 2020
