= KRJC =

- Elko, Nevada; United States
- Broadcast area: Elko, Nevada
- Frequency: 95.3 MHz
- Branding: KRJC 95.3

Programming
- Format: Country

Ownership
- Owner: Paul and Ketra Gardner; (Elko Broadcasting Company, Inc.)
- Sister stations: KELK, KLKO, KEAU, KWNA-FM

Technical information
- Licensing authority: FCC
- Facility ID: 27460
- Class: C1
- ERP: 25,000 watts (translator 250 watts
- HAAT: 236 meters (775 feet)
- Transmitter coordinates: 40°54′35″N 115°49′05″W
- Translator: 98.9 K255CE (Elko)

Links
- Public license information: Public file; LMS
- Webcast: Listen Live
- Website: KRJC Online

KRJC (95.3 FM) is a radio station licensed to serve Elko, Nevada. The station is owned by Paul and Ketra Gardner, through licensee Elko Broadcasting Company. It airs a country music format.

KRJC was assigned its current call letters by the FCC on February 17, 1981. The station was originally owned by Holiday Broadcasting of Salt Lake City, headed by Ralph J. Carlson, a member of the Nevada Broadcasters Hall of Fame. The station has held a cpuntry music format for over 42 years.

In 2018, KRJC was acquired by Paul Gardner's Elko Radio Company for $300,000 from Holiday Broadcasting.

Former logo
