= KWNA-FM =

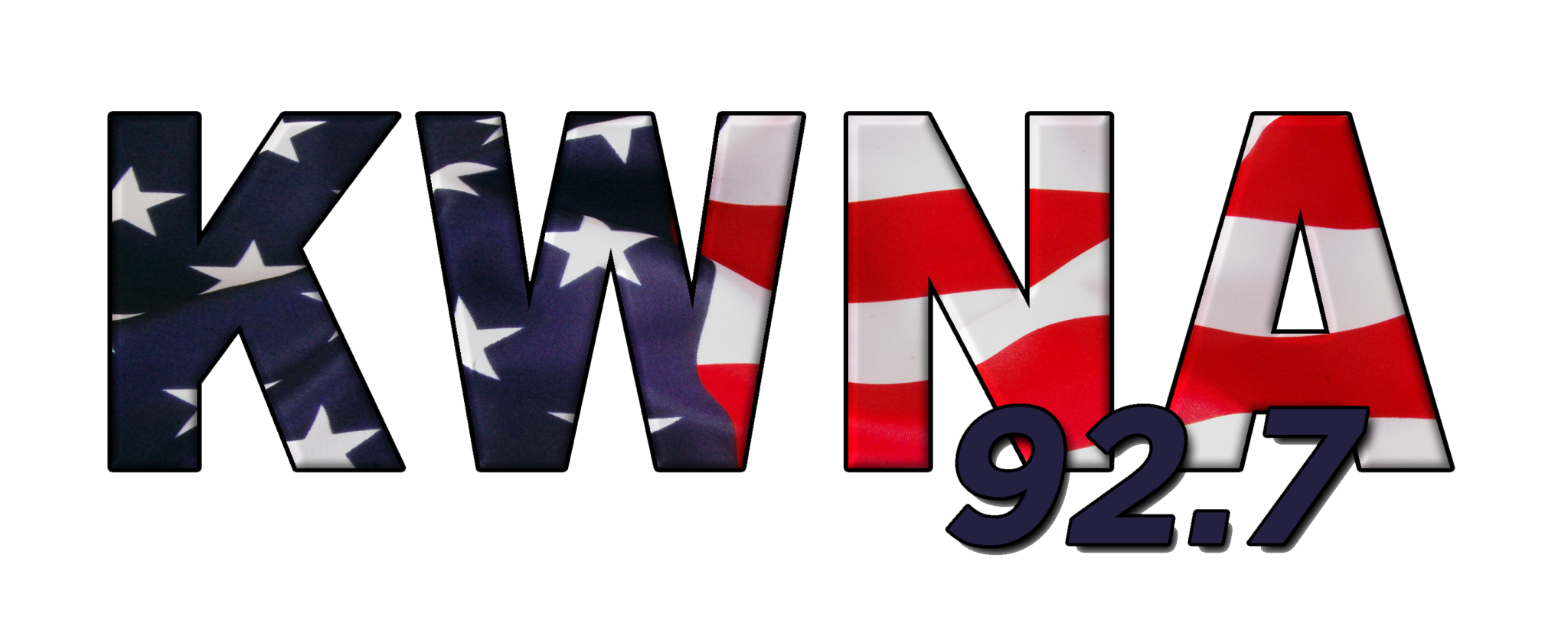
- Winnemucca, Nevada; United States
- Broadcast area: Winnemucca area
- Frequency: 92.7 MHz
- Branding: KWNA, All American Country

Programming
- Format: Country

Ownership
- Owner: Paul and Ketra Gardner; (Elko Broadcasting Company, Inc.)
- Sister stations: KELK, KLKO, KEAU

History
- First air date: 1982
- Call sign meaning: Winnemucca

Technical information
- Licensing authority: FCC
- Facility ID: 60047
- Class: C3
- ERP: 470 watts
- HAAT: 645 meters (2,116 ft)
- Transmitter coordinates: 41°0′40″N 117°45′59″W

Links
- Public license information: Public file; LMS
- Website: kwna.us

KWNA-FM (92.7 FM) is a radio station. Licensed to serve Winnemucca, Nevada, United States, the station is owned by Paul and Ketra Gardner, through licensee Elko Broadcasting Company, Inc., and features country music.

KWNA's former sister KWNA (AM) was on 1400 kHZ. That AM station and its 92.1 FM translator were taken off the air and their licenses were formally canceled by the FCC in March 2021, after the station had remained silent for over a year. KWNA-FM (92.7 MHz) is a separate facility and remains active.

== History ==
The station's broadcast history dates back to 1982. In the early 1990s, the station's technical status was formally upgraded from a Class A to a Class C3 facility.

In May 2019, the station, then branded as "92.7 Buckaroo Country," was acquired by Paul and Ketra Gardner's Elko Broadcasting Company from JDK Broadcasting, LLC, for a purchase price of $15,000. The new owners began operating the station immediately via a Time Brokerage Agreement.

In November 2025, the ownership of the entire Elko Broadcasting Company cluster, including KWNA-FM, was transferred to Tyler Gunter's 5T, LLC.
