= KEAU =

KEAU may refer to:

- KEAU (FM), a radio station (104.7 FM) licensed to serve Elko, Nevada, United States
- Chippewa Valley Regional Airport (ICAO code KEAU)
