= List of people from Paradise Valley, Arizona =

This is a list of notable past and present residents of the U.S. city of Paradise Valley, Arizona.

== Arts ==
- Asher Angel – actor
- Erma Bombeck – humorist
- Charles Boyer – actor
- Erskine Caldwell – writer
- Glen Campbell – musician
- Max Cavalera – musician
- Alice Cooper – singer
- Calico Cooper – dancer, actor, and singer
- Sheryl Cooper – dancer and dance instructor
- Clive Cussler – writer
- Boyé Lafayette De Mente – author, journalist
- Hugh Downs – broadcaster
- Yvonne Lime Fedderson – philanthropist, founder of Childhelp, former actress
- Hunter Gomez – actor
- Rob Halford – singer/songwriter
- Jenna Jameson – adult film actress
- Bil Keane – cartoonist
- Cris Kirkwood – musician
- Stevie Nicks – singer
- Leslie Nielsen – actor
- Dave Pratt – radio personality
- Paolo Soleri – architect
- Emma Stone – actress
- Dick Van Dyke – actor

== Business ==
- Michael Bidwill – businessman, prosecutor, football executive; principal owner, chairman, and president of the Arizona Cardinals
- Derrick Hall – business executive, president & CEO of the Arizona Diamondbacks
- Bruce Halle – founder and chairman of Discount Tire; richest man in Arizona, with net worth of $4.2 billion
- Geordie Hormel – heir to Hormel Foods Corp.
- Thelma Keane – businesswoman, wife of Bill Keane
- Charles Keating – businessman and figure in the Lincoln Savings and Loan scandal
- Robert Sarver – businessman and former owner of Phoenix Suns
- Peter Sperling – businessman
- Don Stewart – head of Don Stewart Ministries/Association

== Military ==
- Betty Tackaberry Blake – last surviving member of the first training class of Women Airforce Service Pilots, who with her husband George Blake, built the first house in Paradise Valley

== Politics ==
- Doug Ducey – politician, businessman
- Barry Goldwater – U.S. senator and 1964 Republican presidential nominee
- G. Gordon Liddy – Watergate Scandal, Nixon appointee
- Sandra Day O'Connor – former justice of the US Supreme Court
- Dan Quayle – vice president of the United States (1989–1993), United States senator from Indiana (1981–1989), and U.S. representative of Indiana's 4th congressional district (1977–1981)
- William Rehnquist – chief justice of the US Supreme Court

== Science ==
- Paul Davies – physicist and author

== Sport ==
- Muhammad Ali – boxer
- Charles Barkley – basketball player
- Devin Booker – basketball player
- Steve Bush – football player
- Keith Carney – ice hockey defenseman
- Vinnie Del Negro – NBA coach
- Jermaine Dye – baseball player
- Jeff Fassero – baseball player
- Larry Fitzgerald – football player
- Mark Grace – baseball player
- Jeff Hornacek – basketball player, NBA coach
- Randy Johnson – baseball pitcher
- Nikolai Khabibulin – ice hockey goaltender
- Jason Kidd – basketball player, NBA coach
- Miguel Montero – baseball player
- Steve Nash – basketball player
- Shaquille O'Neal – basketball player
- Jesse Owens – sprinter
- Michael Phelps – swimmer
- Tom Sneva – auto racer
- Terrell Suggs – football player
- Mike Tyson – boxer
- Kurt Warner – football player
- Matt Williams – baseball player
- Kerry Wood – baseball pitcher
