= Elko County Courthouse =

- U.S. National Register of Historic Places
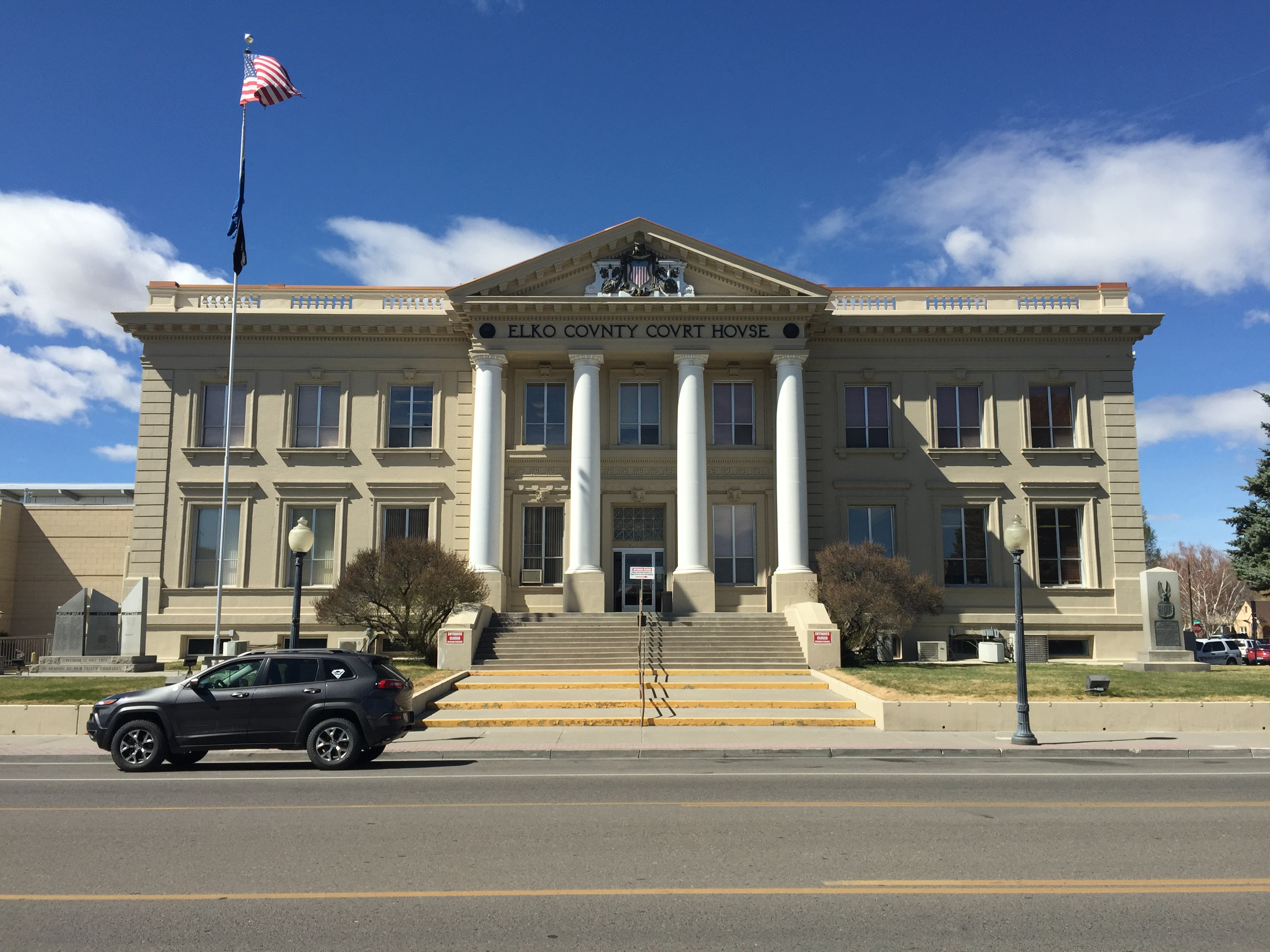

- Location within Nevada Location within the United States
- Interactive map showing the location of Elko County Courthouse
- Location: 571 Idaho St., Elko, Nevada
- Coordinates: 40°50′0.58″N 115°45′42.49″W
- Built: 1911
- Architect: W. H. Weeks; Sellman Bros.
- Architectural style: Classical Revival
- NRHP reference No.: 92001259
- Added to NRHP: September 23, 1992

Elko County Courthouse is a historic building listed on the National Register of Historic Places and located at 571 Idaho Street in Elko, Nevada.

== History ==
The original courthouse building was finished in 1869. It was torn down in 1910 and replaced with the current building.

The site was "a scene of terror" on the night of July 18, 1870, when a giant burning chandelier fell into a throng of people.
