= KHIX =

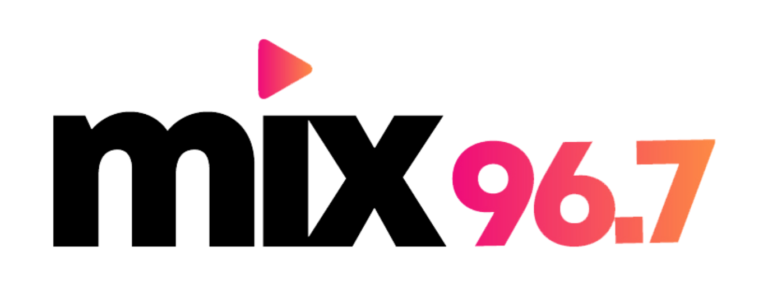
- Carlin, Nevada; United States
- Broadcast area: Elko, Nevada
- Frequency: 96.7 MHz
- Branding: Mix 96.7

Programming
- Format: Contemporary hit radio
- Affiliations: Premiere Networks

Ownership
- Owner: Natalia Hudson’s; (Aegis Media Holdings)
- Sister stations: KBGZ, KUOL

History
- First air date: March 2001

Technical information
- Licensing authority: FCC
- Facility ID: 84839
- Class: C1
- ERP: 12,600 watts
- HAAT: 487 meters (1599 feet)
- Transmitter coordinates: 40°55′18″N 115°50′58″W

Links
- Public license information: Public file; LMS
- Webcast: Listen Live
- Website: mix967fm.com

KHIX (96.7 FM, "Mix 96.7") is a radio station licensed to serve Carlin, Nevada. The station is owned by Natalia Hudson’s, Aegis Media Holdings, Inc., It airs a contemporary hit radio format.

The station was assigned the KHIX call sign by the Federal Communications Commission on May 15, 1998.
