= KTSN (AM) =

Radio station in Texas, United States

- San Leanna, Texas; United States
- Broadcast area: Austin metropolitan area
- Frequency: 1060 kHz
- Branding: Sun Radio

Programming
- Format: Adult album alternative; Americana

Ownership
- Owner: Daryl O'Neal (Recharge Media PBC)
- Sister stations: See § Repeaters, = Listen Live

History
- First air date: March 15, 1967; 59 years ago
- Former call signs: KHRB (1966–1973); KCLT (1973–1983); KHJK (1983–1988); KFIT (1988–2022)
- Call sign meaning: "Sun"

Technical information
- Licensing authority: FCC
- Facility ID: 34430
- Class: D
- Power: 2,000 watts days only
- Transmitter coordinates: 30°19′13″N 97°38′59″W
- Repeater: See § Repeaters

Links
- Public license information: Public file; LMS
- Website: www.sunradio.com

KTSN (1060 kHz) is a Class C AM radio station licensed to San Leanna, Texas, and serving the Austin metropolitan area. It is owned by Recharge Media Public benefit Corporation, supporting the non-profit Sun Radio Foundation. KTSN broadcasts a hybrid radio format of adult album alternative and Americana, branded as "Sun Radio". The studios and offices are at 3601 Bluestein Drive in East Austin with a company owned 10 acre tower site with 3 towers located on Old Manor Road.

KTSN broadcasts at 2,000 watts. As 1060 AM is a clear channel frequency reserved for Class A stations XECPAE in Mexico City and KYW in Philadelphia, Programming is heard on a network of FM, AM and FM translators and repeater stations around the Texas Hill Country and East of San Antonio.

== Mission ==
Sun Radio's mission, is to preserve the culture of Texas music with a minimal impact on the environment. It helps foster new radio broadcasting careers for the residents of the Texas Hill Country and provides 24-hour a day, free local radio for communities in Central Texas.

Proceeds from donations are used to expand local programming, in the creation of local jobs, as support for other non-profit organizations, to broadcast local musicians and events, and in funding new capital projects to maintain its network of radio stations.

== History ==
Lockhart's first radio station signed on the air on March 15, 1967, as KHRB. It was owned by Heath–Reasoner Broadcasters (Dan Heath of Lockhart and Marion Reasoner of Fort Worth) and operated with 250 watts. Radio Caldwell County acquired the station in 1973 and changed the call sign to KCLT. Triple R Broadcasting purchased it in 1979.

The station was assigned the call letters KHJK on November 8, 1983. On February 9, 1988, the station changed its call sign to KFIT.

The station operated as a 250-watt daytimer located in Lockhart for many years. Mike Venditti, working with consultant Don Werlinger (one time principal of KFCC in Bay City, Texas) worked to relocate the station to the three-tower, 2,000-watt operation it is today. Upon moving closer to Austin, the station adopted a Christian and secular talk format.

On May 29, 2022, following the acquisition of the station by Recharge Media (then knows as Township Media) KFIT began originating the adult album alternative and Americana "Sun Radio" format previously found on KTSN (1490 AM), now KJFK), feeding K261DW (100.1 FM) among other signals. The "Sun Radio" programming replaced gospel music on KFIT. AM 1060 and AM 1490 swapped call signs on June 3, 2022.

== Network Stations ==
Sun Radio rebroadcasts on numerous FM outlets, including translator stations, streaming channels, plus a low power (LP) station and an HD radio subchannel, all located around Central Texas. Some signals are owned by Recharge Media DBA the Sun Radio Network or the Sun Radio Foundation (501C3 GuideStar Platinum rated not for profit for the Arts) KDRP-LP 103.1 MHz in Dripping Springs is owned by Principle Broadcasting Foundation.

There is also a service agreement to provide underwriting sales for KOWO-LP 104.1 MHz, in Wimberley, operating as Wimberley Texan Radio, KDRP LP 103.1 in Dripping Springs Texas and a services agreement with KAZI 88.7FM in Austin.

Location	Frequency	Call sign	Effective radiated power	Height above average terrain	Ownership	Notes
Austin, Texas	100.1 MHz	K261DW	999 watts	373.8 meters (1,226 ft)	Recharge Media	
San Marcos, Texas	99.9 MHz	K260CB	250 watts	46.8 meters (154 ft)	Recharge Media	
Luckenbach, Texas	106.9 MHz	K295CK	62 watts vertical	94 meters (308 ft)	Sun Radio Foundation	
Dripping Springs, Texas	103.1 MHz	KDRP-LP	100 watts	137 meters (449 ft)	Principle Broadcasting Foundation	
Blowout, Texas	88.9 MHz	KTSN-FM	125 watts	135 meters (443 ft)	Sun Radio Foundation	
Gonzales, Texas	88.1 MHz	KCTI-FM	1,300 watts	117 meters (384 ft)	Sun Radio Foundation	
Mason, Texas	104.1 MHz	KMSN	25,000 watts	96 meters (315 ft)	Recharge Media	
Bastrop, Texas	107.1 MHz	KLZT-HD3	49,000 watts	152 meters (499 ft)	Sinclair Audio	Sun Radio Network leases the HD3 subchannel.
