= List of mayors of Elko, Nevada =

Mayors of the city of Elko, Nevada, USA

The following is a list of mayors of the city of Elko, Nevada, United States.

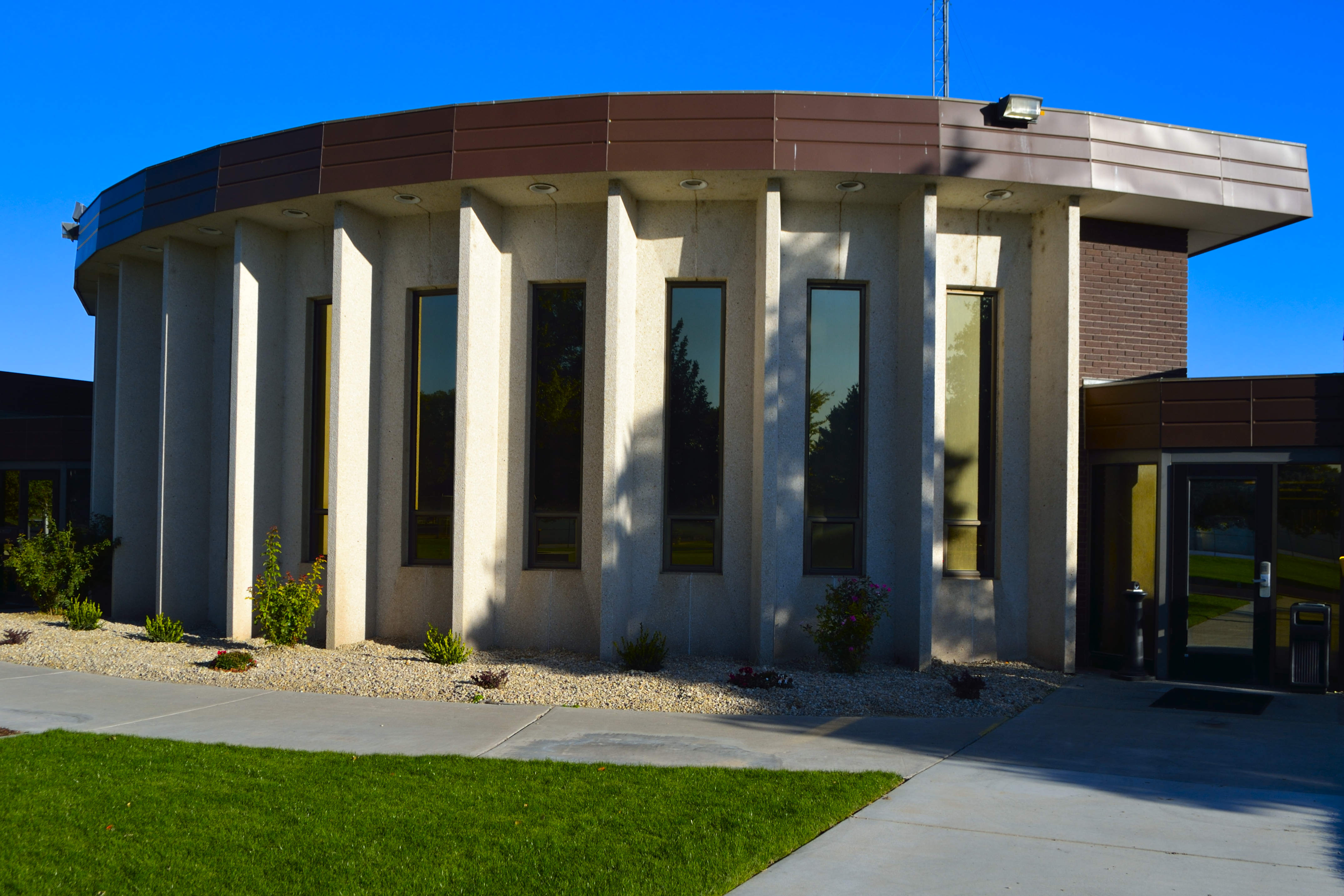
Elko City Hall, 2012

- J.A. McBride, 1917–1921
- Robert W. Hesson, ca.1921–1927
- Walter S. Dupont, ca.1927–1929
- David Dotta, 1929–1955
- Frank Williams, ca.1955–1967
- Leland L. “Dutch” Stenovich, ca.1971–1975
- Donald George Corner, ca.1975–1991
- Jim Polkinghorne, ca.1991
- Michael J. Franzoia, ca.2001–2009
- Chris Johnson, ca.2011–2018
- Reece Keener, 2019–present

== See also ==
- Elko history
