= Dave Pratt =

American radio personality and businessman

- Born: Elko, Nevada
- Other name: "Morning Mayor"
- Occupation: radio personality
- Known for: "Dave Pratt in the Morning" (radio show)

Dave Pratt is an American radio personality, known to his fans as the "Morning Mayor". His show Dave Pratt in the Morning became the longest running rock and roll morning show in the United States. Pratt has sold more than 100,000 albums with his band (Sex Machine Band), headlining sold-out shows in major venues throughout Arizona.

The sobriquet "Morning Mayor" was given to him by Attorney General Terry Goddard.

== Life ==
Pratt began his career at the age of 16 on KELK in his hometown of Elko, Nevada.

Dave Pratt was inducted into the Arizona Broadcaster's Hall of Fame in 2009, and he is the only personality in the history of Arizona radio to be nominated nationally as "Personality of the Year" in both Rock and Country.

In 1981, Pratt joined 98KUPD in Phoenix, Arizona and became one of the most popular morning personalities in the city. During his 3 decades of radio in Arizona, "The Morning Mayor" led KUPD to be named "America's Rock Station of the Year".

In January 2002, Pratt joined CBS Radio’s alternative rock station KZON in Arizona, and once again, his show was propelled to the top. KZON quickly became Arizona's new top-rated rock station.

In 2003, Pratt took his morning show to KMLE, one of Phoenix's country stations. Dave Pratt in the Morning moved to the top of the country battle, nominated as Personality of the Year for both rock and country.

In 2005, Dave Pratt attended the CMA Awards at Madison Square Garden in New York City, where he was nominated for Major Market Morning Show of the Year.

In 2008, CBS downsized many major personalities due to falling revenue across all markets and in general, for the radio industry. The remainder of Pratt's contract was paid out by CBS. Pratt remained paid but off the air while the remainder of his contract was paid out by KMLE.

In 2010, Dave Pratt founded Pratt Podcasting (formerly referred to as Star Worldwide Networks). The network also produces major commercials for clients throughout the nation, produces audiobooks and produces videomercials for companies of all sizes.

On July 11, 2016, Pratt added his own 1-hour, daily local television show, "Dave Pratt Live," every weekday at 1 PM on CW6, and extended it with a weekend show on Sunday nights. In 2018, Dave Pratt Live moved from CW6 to Pratt's own Pratt Podcasting.

In 2018, along with already being inducted into the Broadcaster's Hall of Fame, Pratt was also inducted into the Music and Entertainers Hall of Fame with Alice Cooper, Stevie Nicks. Steven Spielberg and other notables from Arizona.

He and his wife Paula reside in Paradise Valley, Arizona. They have four children.

== Bibliography ==
Pratt published an autobiography, titled Behind the Mic: 30 Years in Radio, the proceeds of which benefit the American Cancer Society, Pratt battled prostate cancer in 2005., Pratt was the 2009 celebrity grand marshal for the VA Veterans Day Parade. Phoenix Magazine February 2017 Internet Made The Radio Stars http://www.phoenixmag.com/valley-news/internet-made-the-radio-stars.html

== Current Work at Pratt Marketing Agency ==
Dave Pratt currently leads Pratt Marketing Agency, a full-service marketing and media firm based in Scottsdale, Arizona, in Camelback Tower. The agency is the evolution of Pratt Podcasting, expanding from its original focus on podcasting, broadcasting, and media production into a broader set of marketing and brand development services. It works with businesses across industries to develop customized strategies that include digital marketing, content creation, media placement, and brand consulting.

The agency emphasizes long-term client relationships and tailored strategy development, drawing on Pratt’s decades of experience in radio, television, and media consulting. Its work is centered on helping organizations strengthen visibility, refine messaging, and adapt to evolving digital and broadcast platforms.

Pratt Marketing Agency operates as a continuation of Pratt’s long-standing involvement in media innovation, maintaining the foundational principles of Pratt Podcasting, including an emphasis on storytelling, audience engagement, and multimedia distribution. Over time, it has expanded its scope to serve a wider range of clients seeking integrated marketing and communications support.

Pratt continues to be involved in speaking engagements, live events, and media appearances, maintaining a presence in Arizona’s broadcasting and entertainment community while focusing increasingly on media strategy, marketing development, and business consulting through Pratt Marketing Agency.
