= KBGZ =

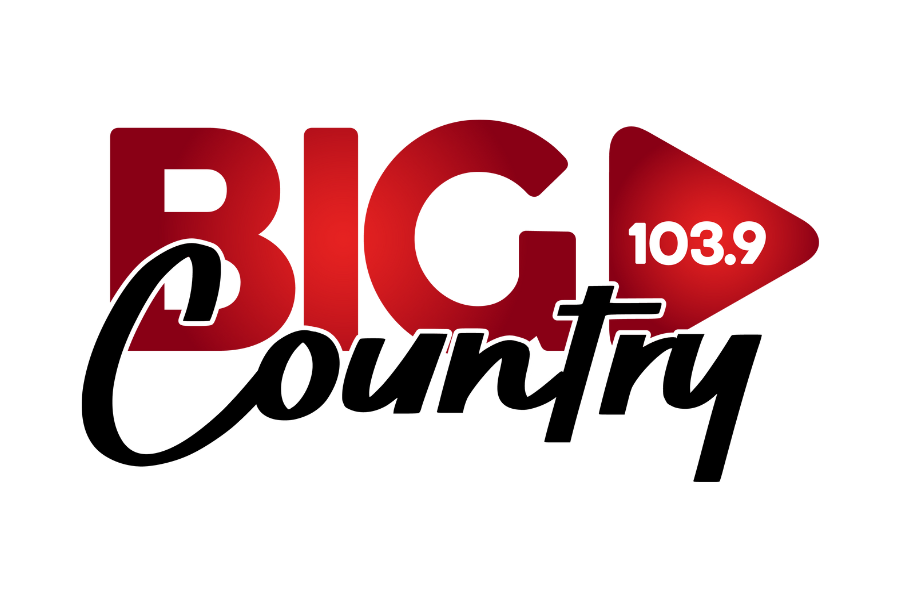
- Elko, Nevada; United States
- Broadcast area: Elko, Nevada
- Frequency: 103.9 MHz (HD Radio)
- Branding: Big Country 103.9

Programming
- Format: Country
- Subchannels: HD2: Conservative talk "Talk Radio 107.7"; HD3: Classic rock "Coyote Rock 101.1"; HD4: Active rock "Overdrive 100.5"

Ownership
- Owner: Richard Hudson; (Global One Media, Inc)
- Sister stations: KUOL, KHIX

History
- First air date: 2008
- Former call signs: KEBG (2007–2011)

Technical information
- Licensing authority: FCC
- Facility ID: 166019
- Class: C1
- ERP: 10,800 watt
- HAAT: 487 meters
- Transmitter coordinates: 40°55′18″N 115°50′58″W
- Translators: HD2: 107.7 K299AN (Elko); HD3: 101.1 K266AB (Elko); HD4: 100.5 K263BD (Spring Creek)

Links
- Public license information: Public file; LMS
- Webcast: Listen Live; Listen Live (HD2); Listen Live (HD3); Listen Live (HD4)
- Website: big1039fm.com talk1077fm.com (HD2) rock1011fm.com (HD3) overdrive1005.com (HD4)

KBGZ (103.9 FM, "Big Country 103.9 FM") is a radio station licensed to serve Spring Creek, Nevada. The station is owned by Richard Hudson, through licensee Global One Media, Inc. It airs a country music format. Classic Country 7 am to 12 pm Sundays. True Country Classics 100.5 FM switched to active rock.

Previous logo

== Ownership and licensing ==
The station, originally bearing the call sign KEBG, commenced broadcasting around 2008.

The station was initially owned by Ruby Radio Corporation. The station transitioned from the KEBG call sign to KBGZ in 2011. In June 2022, KBGZ, along with its sister stations, was acquired by Global One Media, Inc. from Ruby Radio Corporation.

== HD Radio ==
On May 6, 2025 100.5 FM True Country, and KBGZ's HD4 Subchannel changed its format from classic country to active rock as "Overdrive 100.5". The last song on True Country 100.5 was "Heartaches by the Number" by Ray Price. At 12:00 am, True Country 100.5 flipped to rock.
