= KUOL (FM) =

Radio station in Elko, Nevada

- Elko, Nevada; United States
- Broadcast area: Elko, Nevada
- Frequency: 94.5 MHz (HD Radio)
- Branding: 94.5 Kool-FM

Programming
- Format: Classic hits
- Subchannels: HD2: News/talk "Talk Radio 107.7"
- Affiliations: Premiere Networks; United Stations Radio Networks; Westwood One

Ownership
- Owner: Brian D. Shapiro; (Chapter 7 Trustee for Global One Media, Inc.)
- Sister stations: KBGZ; KHIX; KHYX

History
- Founded: September 1, 2005 (as KOYT)
- First air date: 2005 (as KOYT)
- Former call signs: KOYT (2005–2010); KZBI (2010–2020)
- Call sign meaning: "Cool"

Technical information
- Licensing authority: FCC
- Facility ID: 164140
- Class: C0
- ERP: 36,000 watts
- HAAT: 463 meters (1,519 ft)
- Transmitter coordinates: 40°55′18″N 115°50′58″W

Links
- Public license information: Public file; LMS
- Webcast: Listen live
- Website: www.kool945fm.com

KUOL (94.5 MHz, "Kool 94.5 FM") is an FM radio station licensed to serve Elko, Nevada, United States. The station is owned by Brian D. Shapiro, Chapter 7 Trustee for Global One Media, Inc. It airs a classic hits format. For much of November and December, it switches to all-Christmas music.

The station was assigned the KOYT call sign by the Federal Communications Commission on September 1, 2005, and changed to KZBI on August 1, 2010.

On September 1, 2020, KZBI changed its call sign to KUOL. On September 10, 2020, the station flipped to classic hits as "94.5 Kool-FM", as part of a format swap between KUOL and K299AN/KUOL-HD2, which now airs KUOL's former news/talk format as "Talk Radio 107.7".
