= KEAU (FM) =

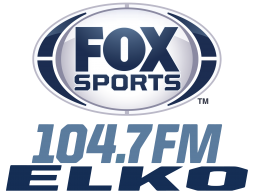
- Elko, Nevada; United States
- Frequency: 104.7 MHz
- Branding: Fox Sports 104.7 FM Elko

Programming
- Format: Sports
- Affiliations: Fox Sports Radio

Ownership
- Owner: Elko Broadcasting Company
- Sister stations: KELK, KLKO, KRJC

History
- First air date: 2014

Technical information
- Licensing authority: FCC
- Facility ID: 189486
- Class: C2
- ERP: 1,150 watts
- HAAT: 469 metres (1,539 ft)
- Transmitter coordinates: 40°55′20″N 115°50′56″W

Links
- Public license information: Public file; LMS
- Website: KEAU Online

KEAU (104.7 FM) is a radio station licensed to serve the community of Elko, Nevada. The station is owned by Elko Broadcasting Company. It airs a sports format, with programming from Fox Sports Radio. It is part of the Elko Broadcasting Company group, alongside KELK and KLKO.

The station is an affiliate of Fox Sports Radio. The station serves as a local affiliate for the Las Vegas Raiders Radio Network.

KEAU and its sister KLKO broadcast from a transmitter northwest of Elko near the Elko Snowbowl Ski area.

== History ==
The station was assigned the KEAU call letters by the Federal Communications Commission on September 12, 2014. The station was subsequently granted a full license to operate. KEAU is part of the Elko Broadcasting Company, which has been serving the Elko market since 1948. Control of the station was transferred to 5T, LLC in October 2023, along with its sister stations.

In 2023, as part of the overall ownership transfer, the acquisition agreement included the separate purchase of the station's studio building and tower site for a set price, ensuring the continued physical operations of the entire EBC cluster remain local.
