= Elko, Nevada =

City in Nevada, United States

- City
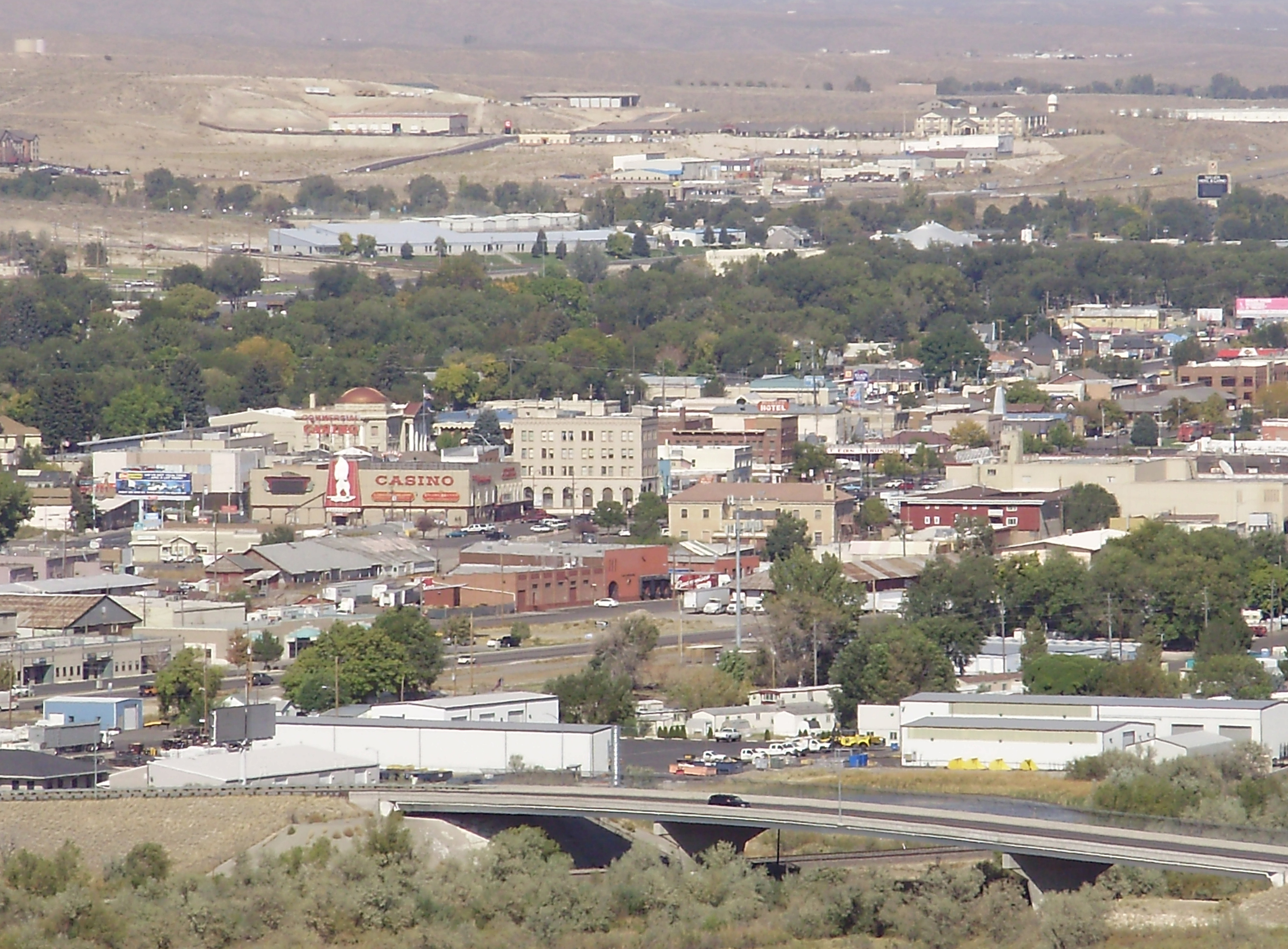
- Downtown Elko

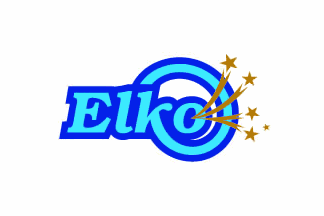
- Flag Logo
- Motto: The Heart of Northeast Nevada
- Location of Elko, Nevada

- Location in Nevada Elko, Nevada (the United States)
- Coordinates: 40°50′20″N 115°44′25″W
- Country: United States
- State: Nevada
- County: Elko
- First settled: 1868
- Designated county seat: 1869
- Incorporated (city): 1917

Government
  - Mayor: Reece Keener
  - Senate: John Ellison (R)
  - Assembly: Bert Gurr (R)
  - U.S. Congress: Mark Amodei (R)

Area
  - Total: 17.85 sq mi (46.22 km^{2})
  - Land: 17.85 sq mi (46.22 km^{2})
  - Water: 0 sq mi (0.00 km^{2})
- Elevation: 5,112 ft (1,558 m)

Population (2020)
  - Total: 20,564
  - Density: 1,152.3/sq mi (444.92/km^{2})
- Time zone: UTC−08:00 (Pacific (PST))
  - Summer (DST): UTC−07:00 (PDT)
- ZIP Codes: 89801-89803
- Area code: 775
- FIPS code: 32-22500
- GNIS feature ID: 2410428
- Website: elkocity.com

Nevada Historical Marker
- Reference no.: 106

Elko is a city in and the county seat of Elko County, Nevada, United States. As of the 2020 census, Elko had a population of 20,564. Elko serves as the center of the Ruby Valley, a region with a population of over 55,000. Elko is 21 miles (34 km) from Lamoille Canyon and the Ruby Mountains, providing year-round access to recreation, including hiking, skiing, hunting, and more than 20 alpine lakes. The city straddles the Humboldt River. Spring Creek, Nevada, serves as a bedroom community 6 miles (10 km) from the city with a population of 13,805.

Elko is the principal city of the Elko Micropolitan Statistical Area, a micropolitan area that covers Elko and Eureka counties. Although a small city, Elko is the largest city for over 130 miles (210 km) in each direction until Twin Falls, Idaho; the city motto states it is "The Heart of Northeast Nevada."

Elko is home to Great Basin College, as well as to the National Weather Service Weather Forecast Office, serving most of northern and central Nevada.

== History ==
Though Elko lies along the route of the historic California Trail, its roots as a town date only back to its establishment in 1868 by settlers, when it was at the east end of the railroad tracks built by the Central Pacific Railroad (the portion of the First transcontinental railroad built from California to Utah). When the railroad crews moved on, Elko remained, serving as a center for ranching, mining, rail freight, and general supplies.

Elko is said to have been named by Charles Crocker, a superintendent of the Central Pacific Railroad. He was fond of animal names and added the letter "o" to Elk. There is no definitive evidence of this naming history, but it has become the widely accepted version.

The first Elko County Courthouse was built in 1869. Elko was officially incorporated as a city in 1917. The first church and school opened in 1870, and in 1896, Elko High School became the first county school in Nevada.

In 1925, the Kelly Act (also known as the Air Mail Act of 1925) authorized the United States Postal Service to contract with private airlines for the feeder routes that fed the main transcontinental route. The first commercial airmail flight in the United States was on the 487-mile (784 km) Airmail Route #5 from Pasco, Washington, to what would become Elko Regional Airport on April 6, 1926. The flight was piloted by Leon D. Cuddeback and included a brief stop in Boise, Idaho, to pick up more mail.

The 1910 replacement for the original courthouse is listed on the National Register of Historic Places. The U.S. Post Office-Elko Main, which was built in 1933, is also listed.

The population of Elko greatly increased in the late 1960s when microscopic gold was discovered along the Carlin Unconformity. Many mining companies arrived and there was an influx of residents.

== Geography ==
According to the United States Census Bureau, the city has a total area of 17.6 square miles (45.7 km^{2}), all land, though the path of the Humboldt River fills from time to time. Elko is also very close to the Ruby Mountains.

=== Climate ===
Climate chart for Elko

Elko's climate is cool semi-arid (Köppen BSk). January is normally the coldest month of the year, with a daily average temperature of 25.1 °F (−3.8 °C), and July the hottest, with a daily average of 70.2 °F (21.2 °C). There are an average of 1.8 days with 100 °F (37.8 °C) highs, 44 days of 90 °F (32.2 °C) highs, 24 days that do not top freezing, 198 nights with freezing lows, and 12 nights with sub-0 °F (−17.8 °C) lows; the growing season here is short, as the average window for freezing temperatures is September 10 through June 9. Annual precipitation averages 9.89 inches (251.2 mm), falling on an average of 81 days, while annual snowfall averages 41.5 inches or 1.1 meters. There are normally 130 sunny days each year. The highest temperature on record is 107 °F or 41.7 °C, most recently on July 4, 1981, and the lowest on record is −43 °F (−41.7 °C) on January 21, 1937.

The most rainfall in 24 hours was 4.13 inches (104.9 mm) on August 27, 1970, and the most water-equivalent precipitation in one month was 5.71 inches (145.0 mm) – all as snow – in January 1916. The most rainfall in one calendar year was 18.34 inches (465.8 mm) in 1983, and the least 4.35 inches (110.5 mm) in 1919, though from July 1923 to June 1924, only 3.72 inches (94.5 mm) was recorded. The most snowfall in one month was 69.0 inches or 1.8 meters in January 1890, with the most in one season being more than 91 inches or 2.3 meters from July 1889 to June 1890 (some days being missing) and the least 6.0 inches (0.15 m) from July 1939 to June 1940. The greatest depth of snow on the ground was 24 inches or 0.61 meters on February 5, 1932, though an average winter will see a maximum snow cover of 7 inches (0.18 m).

Climate data for Elko, Nevada (Elko Regional Airport), 1991–2020 normals, extremes 1890–present
Month	Jan	Feb	Mar	Apr	May	Jun	Jul	Aug	Sep	Oct	Nov	Dec	Year
Record high °F (°C)	65 (18)	70 (21)	82 (28)	88 (31)	97 (36)	104 (40)	107 (42)	107 (42)	102 (39)	92 (33)	83 (28)	65 (18)	107 (42)
Mean maximum °F (°C)	50.6 (10.3)	56.0 (13.3)	67.9 (19.9)	77.5 (25.3)	85.8 (29.9)	93.8 (34.3)	99.6 (37.6)	97.3 (36.3)	91.3 (32.9)	81.1 (27.3)	66.7 (19.3)	52.7 (11.5)	100.0 (37.8)
Mean daily maximum °F (°C)	37.9 (3.3)	42.8 (6.0)	53.1 (11.7)	59.6 (15.3)	70.0 (21.1)	81.5 (27.5)	91.8 (33.2)	90.0 (32.2)	80.1 (26.7)	65.5 (18.6)	49.9 (9.9)	38.0 (3.3)	63.4 (17.4)
Daily mean °F (°C)	27.0 (−2.8)	31.6 (−0.2)	39.9 (4.4)	45.6 (7.6)	54.2 (12.3)	63.2 (17.3)	71.9 (22.2)	69.6 (20.9)	60.3 (15.7)	47.4 (8.6)	35.9 (2.2)	26.7 (−2.9)	47.8 (8.8)
Mean daily minimum °F (°C)	16.0 (−8.9)	20.5 (−6.4)	26.8 (−2.9)	31.5 (−0.3)	38.5 (3.6)	44.9 (7.2)	52.0 (11.1)	49.2 (9.6)	40.5 (4.7)	29.4 (−1.4)	21.9 (−5.6)	15.4 (−9.2)	32.2 (0.1)
Mean minimum °F (°C)	−5.1 (−20.6)	−2.1 (−18.9)	12.5 (−10.8)	17.9 (−7.8)	23.3 (−4.8)	31.8 (−0.1)	38.8 (3.8)	35.6 (2.0)	24.3 (−4.3)	13.2 (−10.4)	3.3 (−15.9)	−4.1 (−20.1)	−11.4 (−24.1)
Record low °F (°C)	−43 (−42)	−41 (−41)	−15 (−26)	−2 (−19)	8 (−13)	12 (−11)	28 (−2)	20 (−7)	9 (−13)	0 (−18)	−16 (−27)	−41 (−41)	−43 (−42)
Average precipitation inches (mm)	1.19 (30)	0.89 (23)	0.97 (25)	1.05 (27)	1.22 (31)	0.57 (14)	0.36 (9.1)	0.33 (8.4)	0.59 (15)	0.74 (19)	0.88 (22)	1.20 (30)	9.99 (254)
Average snowfall inches (cm)	10.4 (26)	6.8 (17)	5.5 (14)	3.3 (8.4)	0.4 (1.0)	0.0 (0.0)	0.0 (0.0)	0.0 (0.0)	0.0 (0.0)	0.5 (1.3)	4.1 (10)	10.2 (26)	41.2 (105)
Average precipitation days (≥ 0.01 in)	9.4	8.3	8.4	9.0	8.6	4.3	3.2	3.1	3.9	5.1	6.5	9.1	78.9
Average snowy days (≥ 0.1 in)	7.7	6.4	4.8	3.3	0.7	0.0	0.0	0.0	0.0	0.6	3.6	7.3	34.4
Source 1: NWS
Source 2: NOAA

== Demographics ==
Historical population
Census	Pop.	Note	%±
1870	1,160		—
1880	752		−35.2%
1890	766		1.9%
1900	849		10.8%
1910	1,677		97.5%
1920	2,173		29.6%
1930	3,217		48.0%
1940	4,094		27.3%
1950	5,393		31.7%
1960	6,298		16.8%
1970	7,621		21.0%
1980	8,758		14.9%
1990	14,736		68.3%
2000	16,708		13.4%
2010	18,297		9.5%
2020	20,564		12.4%
U.S. Decennial Census

=== 2020 census ===
As of the 2020 census, Elko had a population of 20,564. The median age was 32.4 years. 27.6% of residents were under the age of 18 and 10.9% of residents were 65 years of age or older. For every 100 females there were 105.2 males, and for every 100 females age 18 and over there were 105.2 males age 18 and over.

98.3% of residents lived in urban areas, while 1.7% lived in rural areas.

There were 7,915 households in Elko, of which 37.2% had children under the age of 18 living in them. Of all households, 43.6% were married-couple households, 24.3% were households with a male householder and no spouse or partner present, and 23.5% were households with a female householder and no spouse or partner present. About 29.2% of all households were made up of individuals and 9.0% had someone living alone who was 65 years of age or older.

There were 8,685 housing units, of which 8.9% were vacant. The homeowner vacancy rate was 1.8% and the rental vacancy rate was 10.5%.

Racial composition as of the 2020 census
Race	Number	Percent
White	13,796	67.1%
Black or African American	320	1.6%
American Indian and Alaska Native	721	3.5%
Asian	353	1.7%
Native Hawaiian and Other Pacific Islander	33	0.2%
Some other race	2,834	13.8%
Two or more races	2,507	12.2%
Hispanic or Latino (of any race)	6,297	30.6%

=== 2000 census ===
As of the 2000 census, there were 16,708 people, 6,200 households, and 4,216 families residing in the city. The population density was 1,153.3 inhabitants per square mile (445.3/km^{2}). There were 6,948 housing units at an average density of 479.6 per square mile (185.2/km^{2}). The racial makeup of the city was 83.16% White, 0.37% Black, 2.66% Native American, 1.12% Asian, 0.12% Pacific Islander, 9.63% from other races, and 2.94% from two or more races. Hispanic or Latino people of any race were 21.12% of the population.

There were 6,200 households, out of which 39.2% had children under the age of 18 living with them, 53.5% were married couples living together, 9.1% had a female householder with no husband present, and 32.0% were non-families. 24.5% of all households were made up of individuals, and 6.3% had someone living alone who was 65 years of age or older. The average household size was 2.66 and the average family size was 3.24.

In the city, the population was spread out, with 30.3% under the age of 18, 9.8% from 18 to 24, 31.2% from 25 to 44, 21.0% from 45 to 64, and 7.6% who were 65 years of age or older. The median age was 32 years. For every 100 females, there were 104.6 males. For every 100 females age 18 and over, there were 105.3 males.

The median income for a household in the city was $48,608, and the median income for a family was $52,754. Males had a median income of $43,397 versus $27,366 for females. The per capita income for the city was $20,101. About 6.1% of families and 8.2% of the population were below the poverty line, including 8.9% of those under age 18 and 8.4% of those age 65 or over.

== Economy ==
Elko's economy is based heavily on gold mining, with ranching, tourism and the casino industry providing additional jobs. The city is considered the capital of Nevada's goldbelt. The state of Nevada produces more gold than all but four countries, and most of the gold from Nevada is mined near Elko. This has caused the town to have a boom and bust economy consistent with the rises and declines in the price of gold. The town is surrounded by hundreds of abandoned mining camps, and viewing them is a popular local activity. A gold boom in the 1980s that ended in a bust in the late 1990s left the town with large numbers of abandoned homes and left the local governments struggling to survive on reduced tax revenues. With a new gold boom starting in 2009, city officials have been reluctant to hire new employees and have decided to build a reserve in the city budget to prepare for the next bust.

Elko has struggled to bring in other industries, mostly because of its isolation and the surrounding harsh desert environment. Hunter S. Thompson quipped that in Elko, "The federal government owns 90% of this land, and most of it is useless for anything except weapons testing and poison-gas experiments." However, no experiments have been conducted in Elko or Elko County, but were famously carried out at the Nevada Test Site near Rachel, in Southern Nevada.

== Arts, culture and tourist attractions ==
=== Annual cultural events ===
Elko has been the home of the annual National Cowboy Poetry Gathering since 1985. This festival is held each January and is a week-long celebration of life in the rural West, featuring poetry, music, stories, gear, film, photography, and food. A notable regular attendee was Canadian country musician Ian Tyson.

Every July, since 1963, Elko is host to the National Basque Festival. In 2013 they were scheduled to celebrate their 50th anniversary. Humorously referred to as the "Basquo Fiasco", it is a celebration of traditional Basque culture and its ties to the Elko community. The festival includes strongman competitions, handball, a running of the bulls, traditional food and wine, and Basque dancing.

=== Museums and other points of interest ===
Elko is the home of the Western Folklife Center, a regional nonprofit organization that works to expand understanding of the everyday traditions of people who live and work in the American West. The Western Folklife Center is downtown in the old Pioneer Hotel.

A number of casinos are located in Elko, including Stockmen's Casino and Hotel, the Commercial Casino, the High Desert Casino, Gold Dust West, The Maverick Casino, and the Gold Country Inn and Casino. The Commercial Casino is notable for having a stuffed 10-foot-tall (3.0 m) polar bear on display. For many years the Red Lion brought gamblers to Elko from many parts of the country through flights on Casino Express. The flights to Elko ended in February 2006.

Elko is also home to legal prostitutes and contains active brothels. Under Nevada law, any county with a population of less than 400,000 is allowed to license brothels if it so chooses.

Several geothermal features can be found in Elko, the largest of which is the Elko Hot Hole. Hot springs were used by travelers on the California Trail and subsequently by settlers.

Notable attractions in the Elko region include the Ruby Mountains, in which is the popular Lamoille Canyon. To the north, the Jarbidge Wilderness is among the least visited and cleanest wilderness areas in the United States.

== Education ==
Elko is served by the Elko County School District; the district only has one high school within the city limits, Elko High School.

Great Basin College is located in Elko.

Elko also has a public library, Elko Mybrary, a branch of the Elko-Lander-Eureka County Library System.

== Media ==
=== Newspapers ===
- Elko Daily Free Press
- Elko Independent

=== Television ===
- Elko Television District
- KENV-DT (Roar affiliate, formerly of NBC)

=== Radio ===
Global One Media:

- KBGZ 103.9 FM - "BIG Country", Country
- KHIX 96.7 FM - "Mix 96.7 FM", Top 40
- KUOL 94.5 FM - "94.5 Kool FM", Adult Hits
- KBGZ-HD2 107.7 FM - "TalkRadio 107.7 FM", News Talk K299AN
- KBGZ-HD3 101.1 FM - "Coyote Rock 101.1 FM", Classic Rock K266AB
- KBGZ-HD4 100.5 FM - "Overdrive 100.5 FM", Rock K263BD

Elko Broadcasting Company:

- KELK 1240 AM - Adult Contemporary
- KELK 95.9 FM - Adult Contemporary
- KLKO 93.7 FM - Adult Hits
- KRJC 95.3 FM - Country
- KEAU 104.7 FM - Sports

== Transportation ==
=== Major highways ===
Elko is the largest city between Salt Lake City and Reno, located along Interstate 80. Nevada State Route 225 (Mountain City Highway) connects Elko to Owyhee and southern Idaho, while Nevada State Route 227 (Lamoille Highway) extends southeast to Spring Creek and Lamoille. State Route 535, an I-80 business route and US Route 40's former route, runs through the city south of I-80. It is a bypass of I-80 that starts and ends in Elko.

=== Public Transportation ===
Passenger bus service to Elko is available on Greyhound Lines, while Amtrak's daily California Zephyr provides train passenger service via Elko station. A dial-a-ride service run by Elko County operates within the city.

=== Aviation ===
SkyWest Airlines, operating as Delta Connection, serves Elko Regional Airport (EKO) with regional jet service nonstop to the Delta Air Lines hub in Salt Lake City (SLC). It is the only airport open year-round in Northeastern Nevada. Additionally, Elko Regional Airport is the closest commercial airport to the Ruby Mountains that have many recreational activities.

Elko was once the home base of a jet air carrier, Casino Express Airlines, which operated Boeing 737-200 jetliners to many cities in the U.S. on a scheduled charter basis in support of the local casino industry. Casino Express changed its name to Xtra Airways and relocated its headquarters in June 2010 to Boise, Idaho, and again in May 2015 to Coral Gables, Florida.

Elko was also previously served by United Airlines with scheduled passenger jet service during the 1970s and early 1980s. According to Official Airline Guide (OAG) flight schedules as well as the airline's system timetables, United operated Boeing 737-200 jetliners into the Elko Regional Airport on a year-round basis with a daily round trip routing of San Francisco (SFO)-Reno (RNO)-Elko (EKO)-Ely (ELY)-Salt Lake City (SLC). United eventually discontinued all flights into Elko after serving the airport for over 50 years.

== Notable people ==
- Dirk Borgognone, football player who currently holds the record for the longest field goal ever kicked in the history of high school football, 68 yards
- Lewis R. Bradley, second governor of Nevada, from 1871 to 1879; resident of Elko
- Mae Caine, suffragist and women's rights activist, civic leader, and government official
- Tim Gilligan, football player
- Morley Griswold, 16th governor of Nevada, from 1934 to 1935; born in Elko
- Dave Pratt, radio host, grew up in Elko before moving to Phoenix, Arizona
- Cy Sneed, Major League Baseball pitcher, born in Elko

== Gallery ==
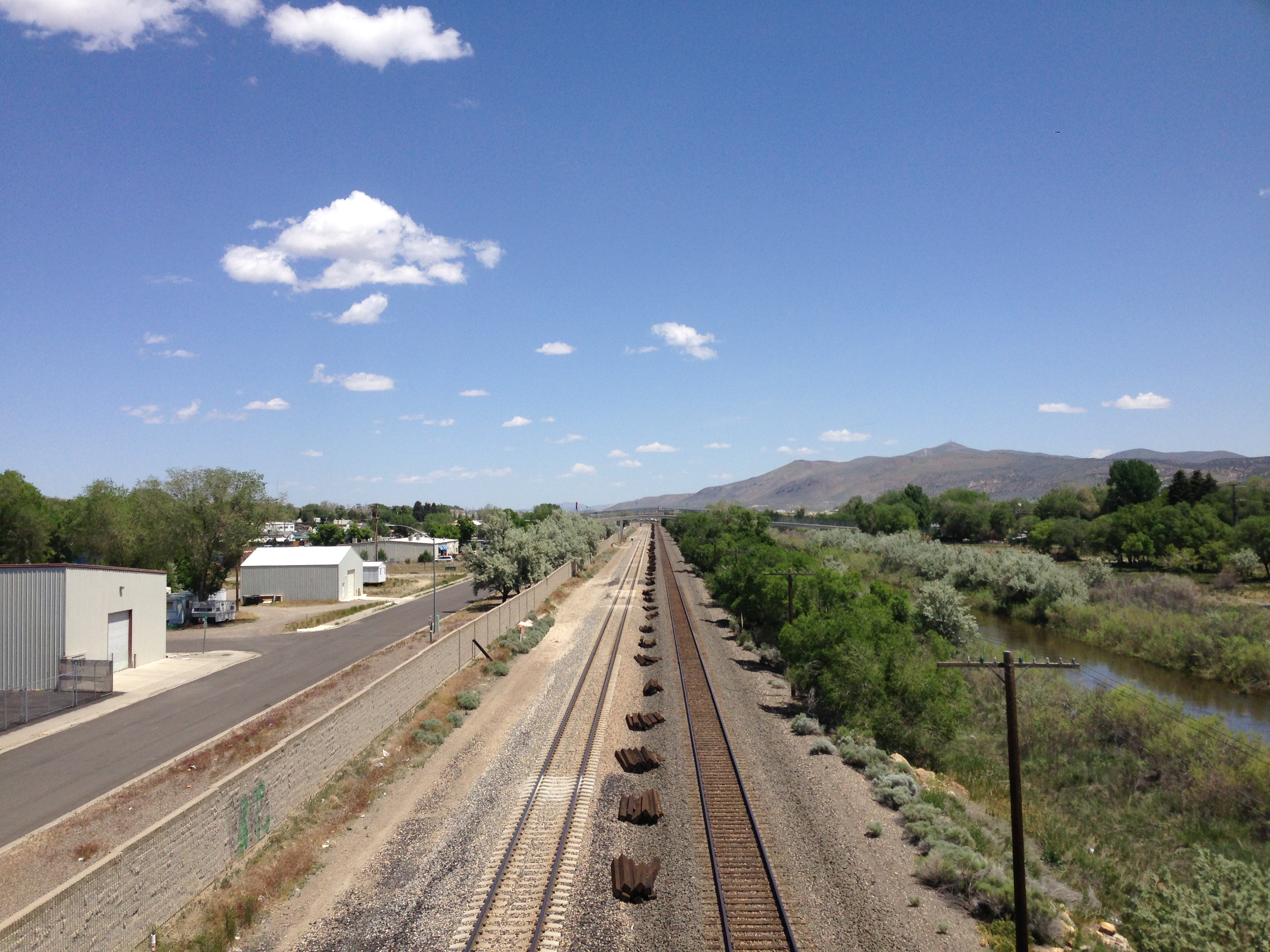
Elko was settled with the coming of the railroad, which still runs past downtown Elko near the Humboldt River.

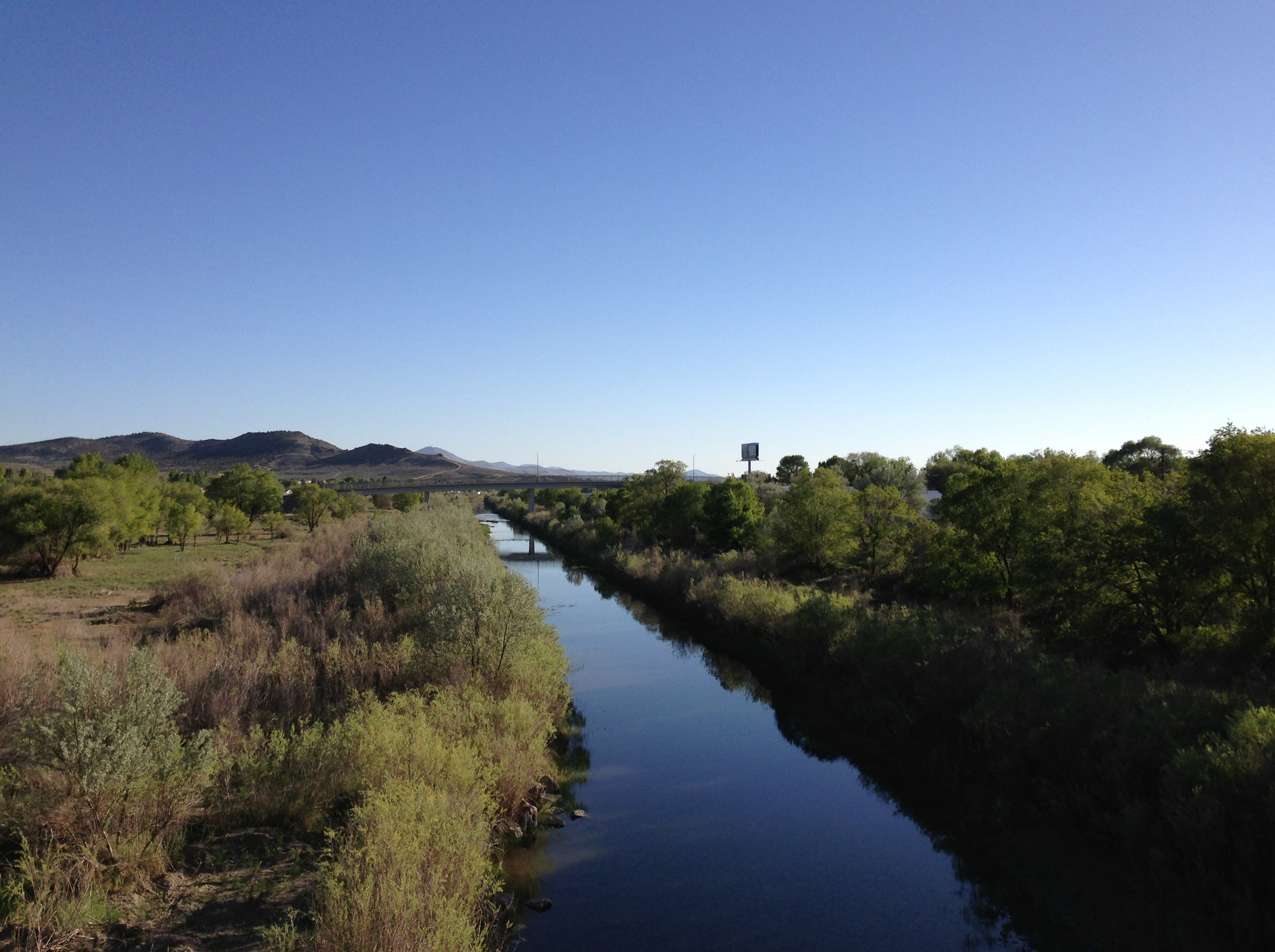
View southwest along the Humboldt River from the 9th Street Footbridge in downtown Elko

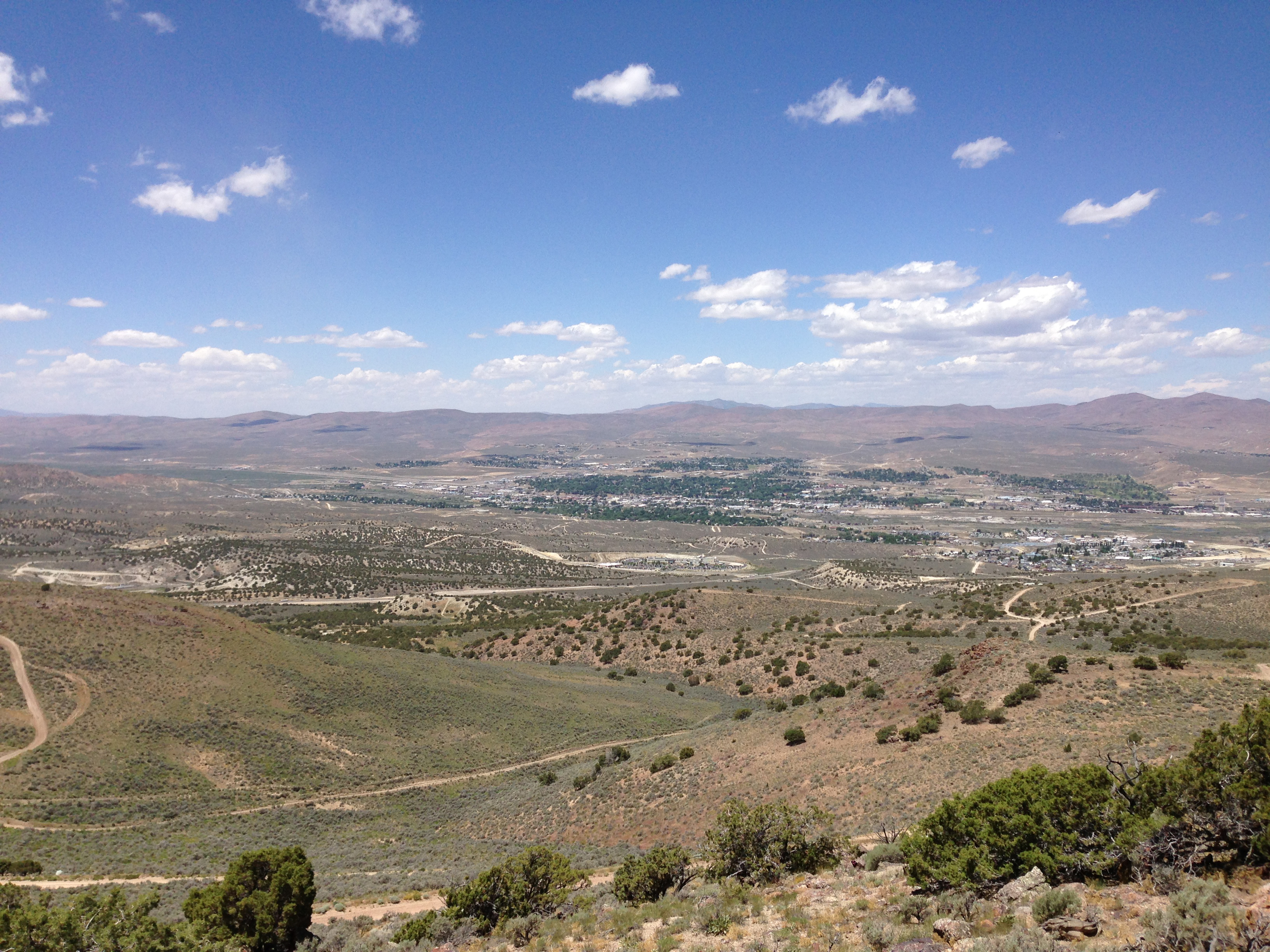
View of Elko from "E" Mountain

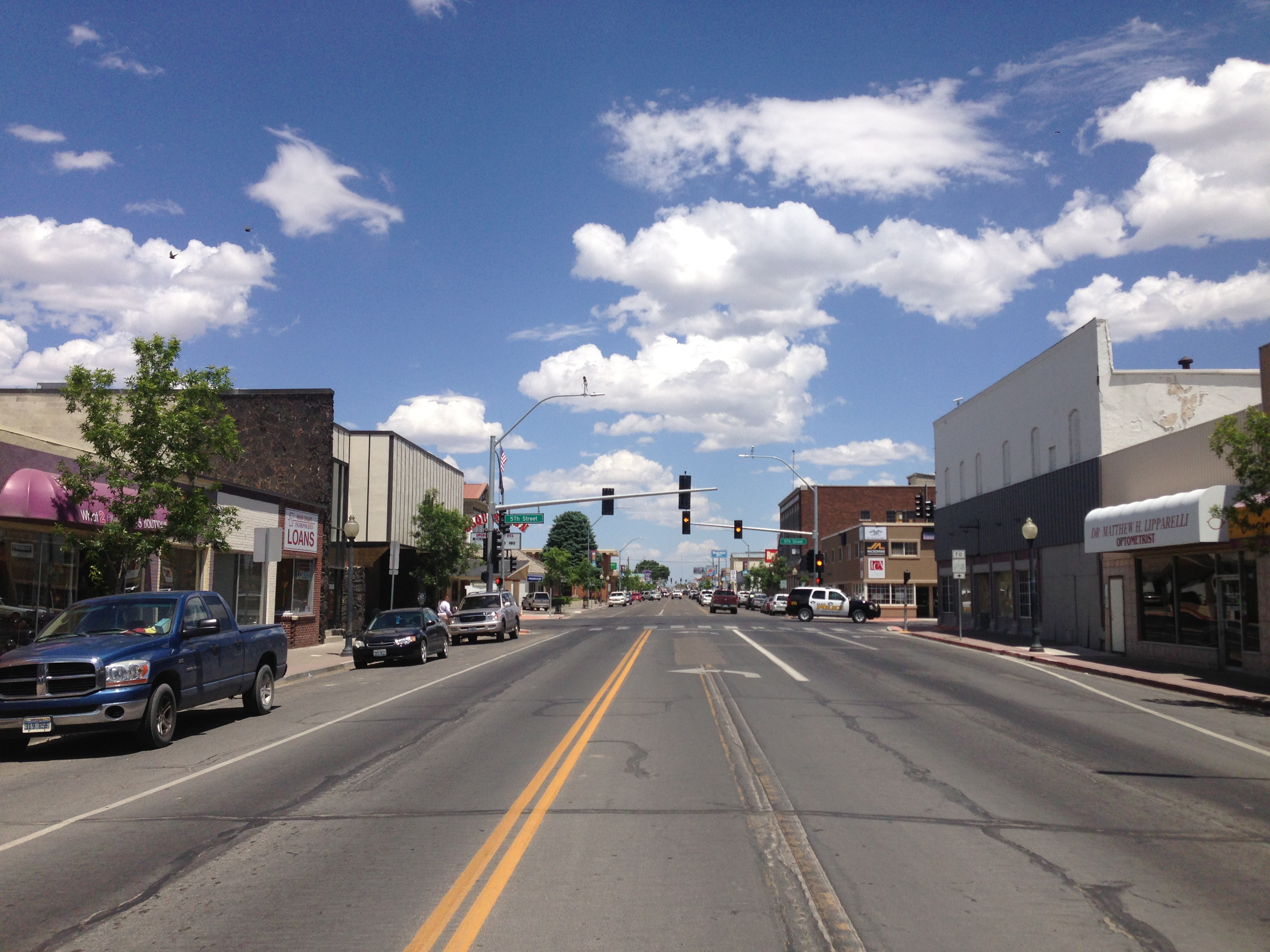
View northeast along Idaho Street (SR 535) in downtown Elko

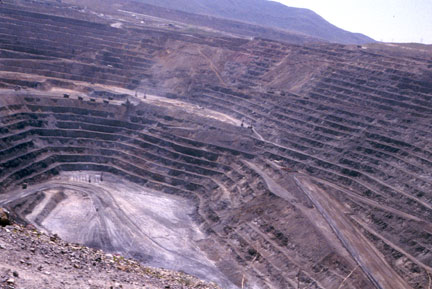
Goldstrike mine, a large gold mine near Elko

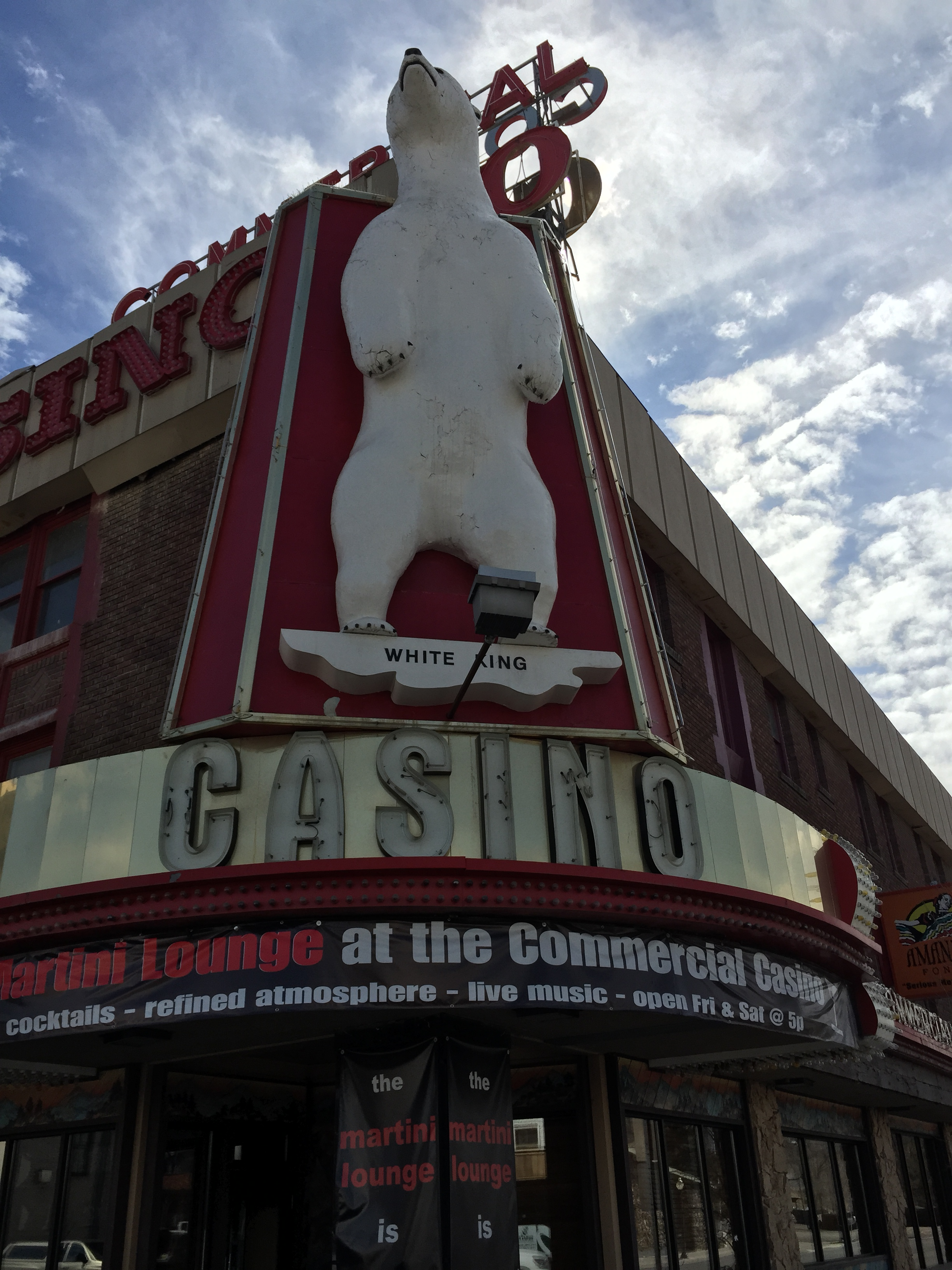
The iconic "White King" at the Commercial Casino in downtown Elko

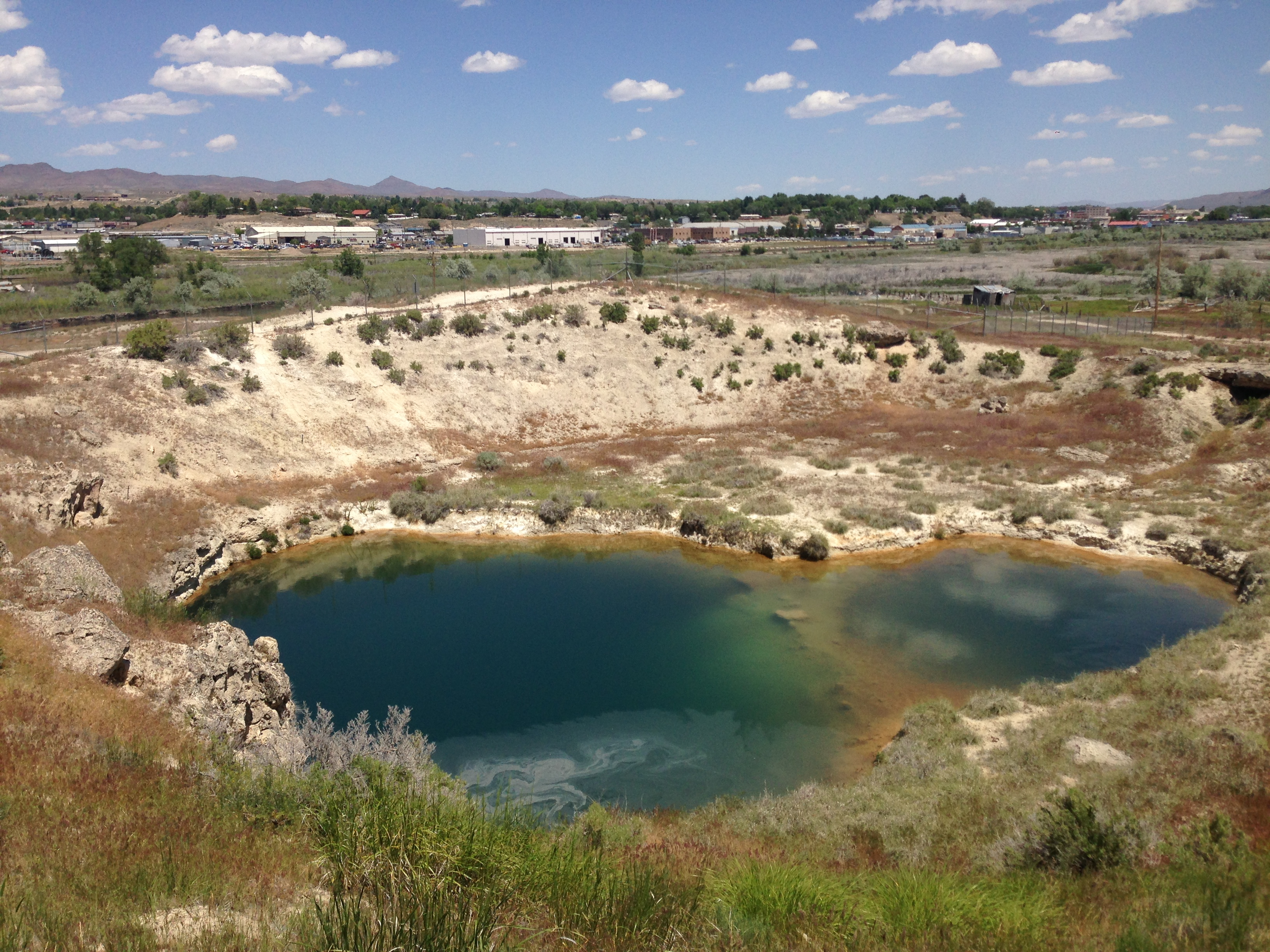
Elko Hot Hole, a hot spring on the southwest edge of the city

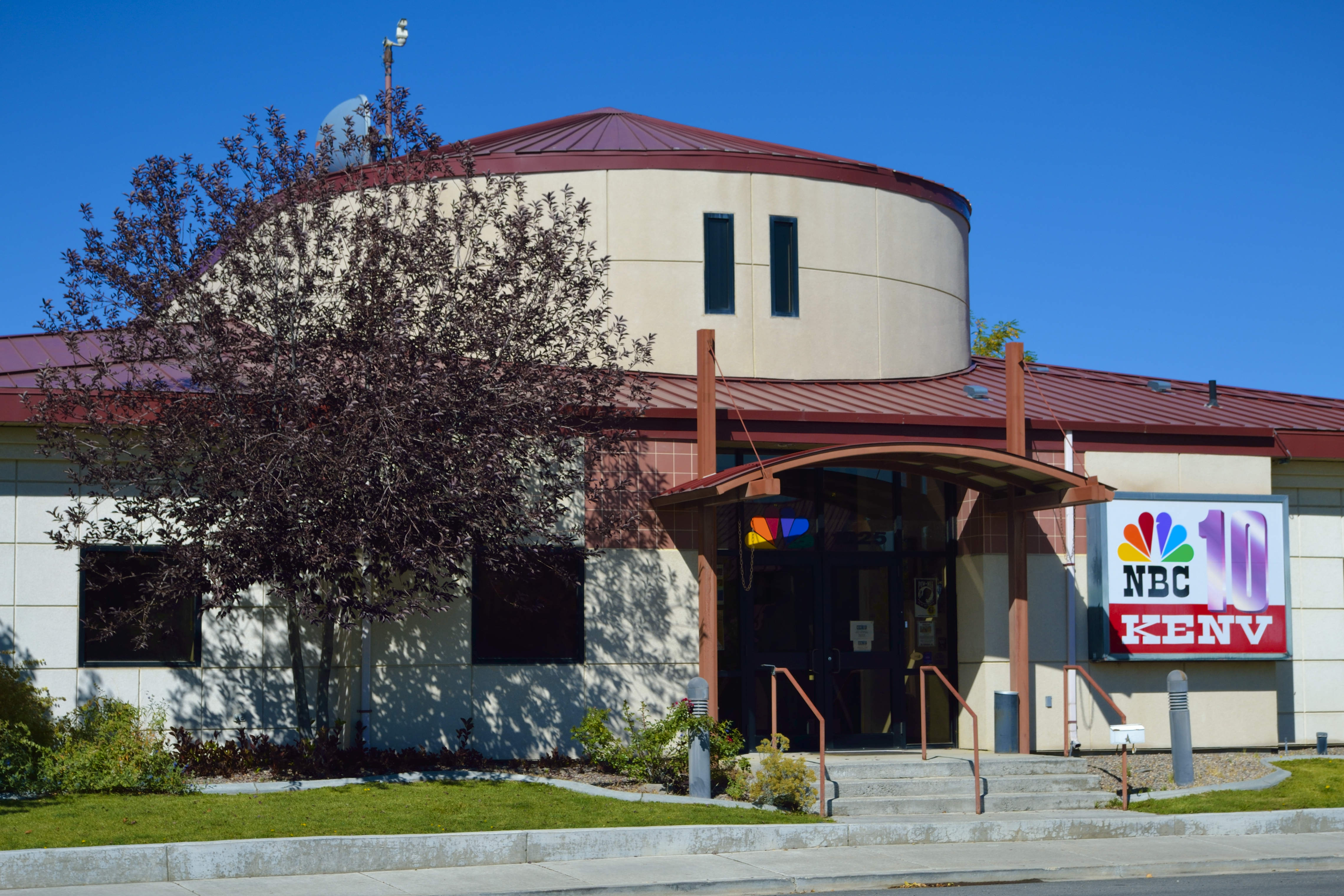
KENV TV studios in Elko

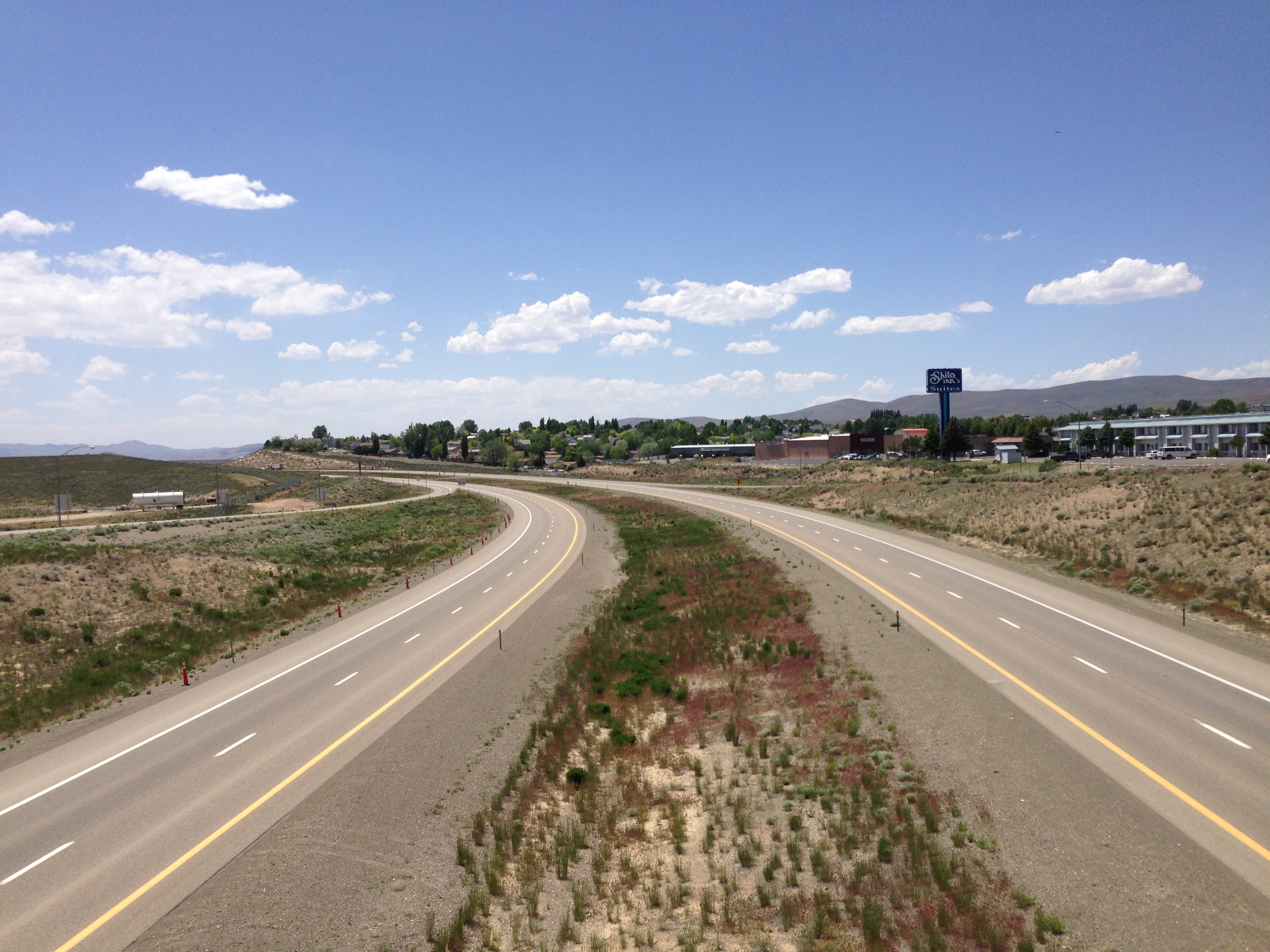
Interstate 80 in Elko

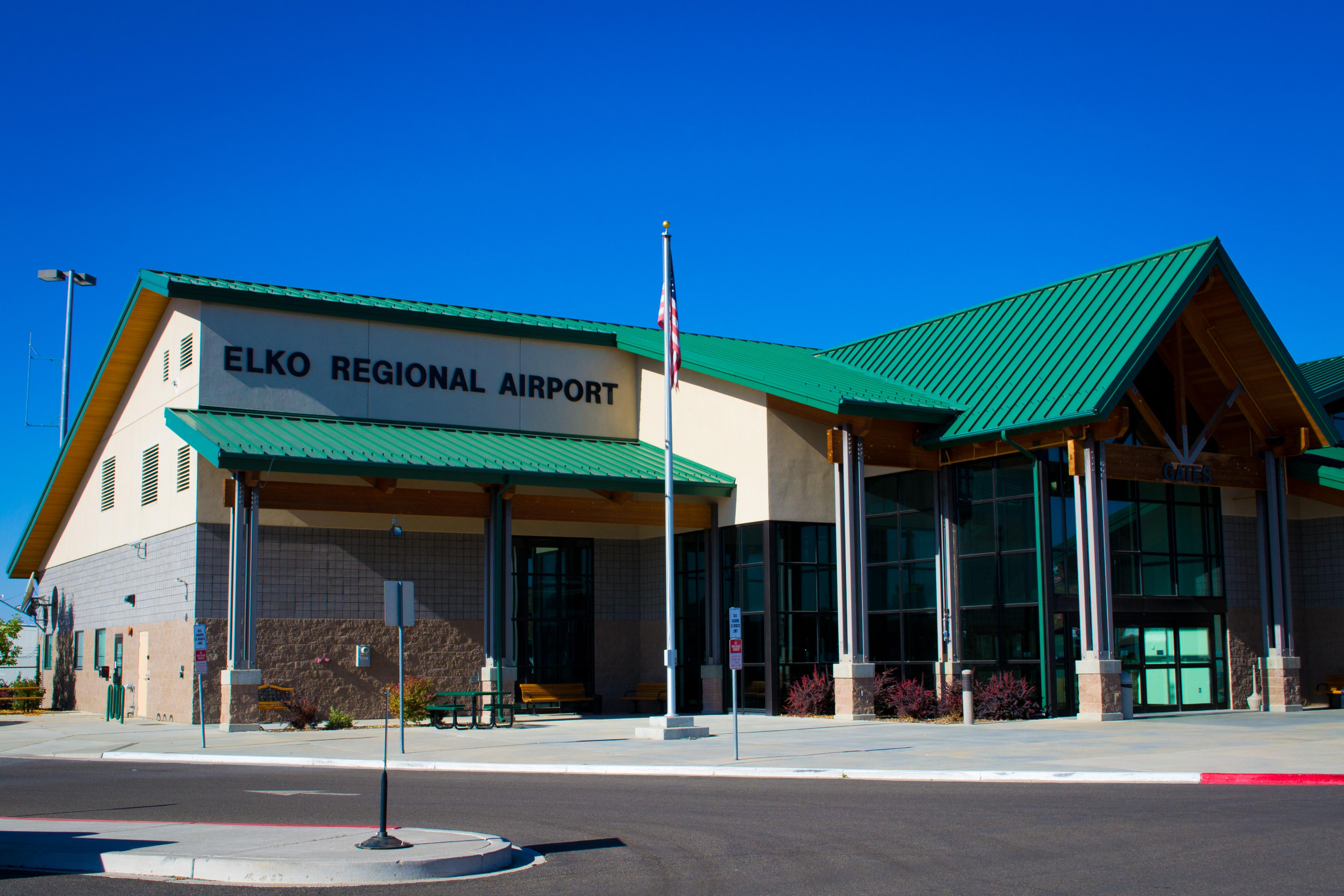
Elko Airport terminal
