= KCTI-FM =

American radio station in Gonzales, Texas

- Gonzales, Texas; United States
- Broadcast area: Gonzales County, Texas
- Frequency: 88.1 MHz
- Branding: Sun Radio

Programming
- Format: Americana

Ownership
- Owner: Sun Radio Foundation
- Sister stations: KJFK, KTSN-FM

History
- First air date: July 29, 2008 (as KZAR)
- Former call signs: KITG (2005–2006; CP); KZAR (2006–2011); KRNZ (2011–2015); KITG (2015–2016)
- Call sign meaning: Cradle Texas Independence (coined by original owner of AM 1450 KCTI Gonzales, which signed on in 1947)

Technical information
- Licensing authority: FCC
- Facility ID: 91220
- Class: A
- ERP: 1,300 watts
- HAAT: 117 m (384 ft)
- Transmitter coordinates: 88.1: 29°29′9″N 97°29′17″W; 99.9: 29°57′15″N 97°53′4″W
- Translator: 99.9 K260CB (San Marcos)

Links
- Public license information: Public file; LMS
- Website: http://sunradio.com

KCTI-FM (88.1 FM) is a terrestrial American radio station, licensed to Gonzales, Texas, United States, and is owned by the Sun Radio Foundation of Bee Cave, Texas.

== History ==
KCTI-FM was first licensed on July 29, 2008 as KZAR, owned by Educational Media Foundation, and used as a repeater for the company's national Air1 Christian format. Educational Media Foundation sold this facility after purchasing 97.7 KLTO in McQueeney, Texas from Univision, moving Air1 to the much larger San Antonio rimshot facility.

In March 2016, the KCTI call letters were allowed to be reused by Maranatha Church of Laredo, who owned this facility at the time, by former KCTI owner Gonzales Communications, replacing the existing KITG call sign with KCTI-FM. This was challenged by KCTI's new owners, Texas Public Radio, after purchasing KCTI from Gonzales Communications, resulting in a request being sent to the Federal Communications Commission by T.P.R. asking the Commission to force Sun Radio to abandon the callsign they felt rightfully belonged to them, and select another one in its place for this station. In response to Texas Public Radio, the Commission stated that it never would have allowed the use of a secondary call sign without “approval from user” of the primary callsign. In this case, it said the former 1450 KCTI General Manager’s email saying he had no problem with this station using KCTI-FM was good enough, and had approval of the KCTI ownership at the time the deal was made. Therefore, Sun Radio was allowed to continue using the FM side of the KCTI call, even though they do not own the original AM facility, nor have the approval of the present KCTI ownership, for the two facilities to share the longtime heritage Gonzales based calls.

Sun Radio Foundation consummated the purchase of KCTI-FM on May 12, 2016.

KCTI-FM operates as a Sun Radio affiliate with local programming consisting of Gonzales Apache football & Sunday morning local church service broadcasts.

== Sun Radio Foundation ==
Sun Radio's mission, in part, is to preserve the culture of Texas music with a minimal impact on the environment. Sun Radio creates and distributes solar-powered radio programming to non-commercial member stations with a focus on Texas artists and Americana music. Sun Radio helps foster new radio broadcasting careers for the residents of the Texas Hill Country, and provide 24-hour a day, free local radio for the communities served.

Proceeds are used to expand local programming, in the creation of local jobs, as support for other non-profit organizations, to broadcast local musicians and events, as well as funding new capital projects designed to increase the Sun Radio Network coverage area.
