= KJFK (AM) =

Radio station in Austin, Texas

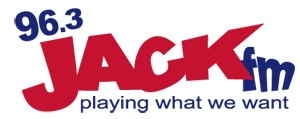
- Austin, Texas; United States
- Broadcast area: Austin-San Marcos-Round Rock metropolitan area
- Frequency: 1490 kHz (HD Radio)
- Branding: 96.3 Jack FM

Programming
- Format: Adult hits
- Affiliations: Jack FM network

Ownership
- Owner: Township Media, LLC
- Sister stations: KTSN, KCTI-FM

History
- First air date: December 20, 1926
- Former call signs: KGDR (1926–1929); KUT (1929–1932); KNOW (1932–1988); KEYU (1988–1989); KMOW (1989–1993); KFON (1993–2012); KLGO (2012–2014); KTAE (2014–2017); KTSN (2017–2022); KFIT (2022)
- Former frequencies: 1500 kHz (1926–1941)
- Call sign meaning: John F. Kennedy

Technical information
- Licensing authority: FCC
- Facility ID: 41211
- Class: C
- Power: 1,000 watts unlimited
- Transmitter coordinates: 30°15′13″N 97°42′25″W
- Translator: 96.3 K242DE (Austin)

Links
- Public license information: Public file; LMS
- Webcast: Listen live
- Website: jack963fm.com

Satellite station
- KJFK-FM
- Llano, Texas; United States
- Broadcast area: Llano, Texas-Texas Hill Country area
- Frequency: 96.3 MHz
- Branding: 96.3 Jack FM

Programming
- Format: Adult hits
- Affiliations: Jack FM network

Ownership
- Owner: Township Media, LLC

History
- First air date: June 17, 2019
- Former call signs: KTHE (2016–2022)
- Call sign meaning: John Fitzgerald Kennedy (former President of the United States of America)

Technical information
- Facility ID: 198631
- Class: C3
- ERP: 8,000 watts
- Transmitter coordinates: 30°58′50.4″N 98°41′13.7″W

Links
- Public license information: Public file; LMS

KJFK (1490 kHz) and KJFK-FM (96.3 MHz) are a pair of terrestrial radio stations, which serve Austin, Texas, and Llano, Texas, United States respectively. Both facilities are owned by Township Media and broadcast an adult hits format as "96.3 Jack FM", using the nationally syndicated Jack FM licensing. KJFK can also be heard in Austin proper on translator K242DE and in Giddings, Texas on KGID, both of which also operate on 96.3 FM.

1490 AM is the oldest continuously licensed radio station serving Austin. The facility broadcasts at 1,000 watts from a transmitter located on Tillery Street at East 4th Street near downtown Austin. The studios and offices for Township Media are in the Hill Country Galleria Mall on Hill Country Boulevard at State Highway 71 in Bee Cave.

== History ==
On December 7, 1926, the station's first license was granted, with the sequentially issued call sign of KGDR. It was owned by a company named "Radio Engineers" and broadcast from San Antonio, Texas. The station went on the air on December 20. In December 1929, the station was renamed KUT and moved to Austin. Call letters were changed to KNOW on January 26, 1932.

KNOW was owned by the KUT Broadcasting Company and broadcast with 100 watts on 1,000 kilocycles.

In the 1940s, KNOW moved to its current frequency 1490 kHz, with power at 250 watts. It served as Austin's ABC Radio Network affiliate, carrying ABC's schedule of dramas, comedies, news and sports during the "Golden Age of Radio".

In 1949, KNOW was acquired by Pioneer Broadcasting Company, owned and operated by radio executive Wendell Mayes. His son, Wendell Wise Mayes, Jr, would go on to earn KNOW a George Foster Peabody Award in 1973 for an editorial Mayes, Jr. wrote entitled "Marijuana and the Law," a series of documentaries and editorials to "separate facts about marijuana from fiction." In the 1950s, daytime power increased to 1,000 watts, but remained at 250 watts at night. In the 1960s, KNOW switched to Top 40. In the 1970s, airstaff included P.D. Dave Jarrott, Randall McKee, Jason Wayne. Bill Mayne, Gil Garcia, Jim Gossett, David Gayle, and Bill Moss. Chief Engineers during the 60s and 70s where Wayne Hardin and Gil Garcia. As contemporary music listening shifted to the FM band in the 1980s, KNOW began to serve Austin's growing African American community with an urban contemporary format. This was concurrent with Hicks Communications acquiring the station in 1981.

In 1989, the now-KMOW was sold to Degree Communications, which switched the format to Oldies. In 1996, the station was sold to San Antonio–based Clear Channel Communications and the format became talk radio. In 1997, the format shifted to sports talk as SportsFan 1490 and was the first full-time all-sports station in Austin.

In 2005, the station was acquired by Border Media Partners, which owned other stations in Texas, several serving the Latino community. Border Media switched the then-KFON to a Regional Mexican music format. The 2010s saw additional call letter changes to KLGO and KTAE before the current owner, Township Media, changed the call sign to KTSN and operating as "Sun Radio". Sun Radio aired an adult album alternative/Americana format.

On May 29, 2022, KTSN changed its format to adult hits, branded as "96.3 Jack FM", feeding new translator K242DE. The Sun Radio intellectual unit moved to 1060 AM (now KTSN), feeding Sun Radio's existing FM rebroadcasters including 100.1 FM. The two stations swapped call signs on June 3, 2022.

On November 4, 2022, Township Media was granted a second call sign change to KJFK, to match the station identification of both facilities; the call sign was changed officially by the FCC on December 7, 2022.
