= KELK =

- Elko, Nevada; United States
- Frequency: 1240 kHz
- Branding: KELK 95.9 FM 1240 AM

Programming
- Format: Adult contemporary
- Affiliations: ABC Radio

Ownership
- Owner: Elko Broadcasting Company
- Sister stations: KLKO, KEAU, KRJC

History
- First air date: 1948 (at 1340)
- Former frequencies: 1340 kHz (1948–1951)

Technical information
- Licensing authority: FCC
- Facility ID: 19371
- Class: C
- Power: 1,000 watts
- Transmitter coordinates: 40°51′56″N 115°43′10″W
- Translator: 95.9 K240AI (Carlin)

Links
- Public license information: Public file; LMS
- Webcast: Listen Live
- Website: KELK Online

KELK (1240 AM) is a radio station broadcasting an adult contemporary format. Licensed to Elko, Nevada, United States, the station is currently owned by Elko Broadcasting Company and features programming from ABC Radio. The station is also heard on 95.9 FM, through a translator licensed to Carlin, Nevada.

The station broadcasts local sports coverage. The station is designated as an EAS Local Primary station for Elko County, serving as an entry point for local and regional emergency warning messages.

The station's news department was recognized by the Associated Press as The News Station of the Year.

== History ==
KELK was founded by Harold Thompson, a local entrepreneur, and signed on the air in December 1948. It was the inaugural radio station in Elko, initially operating on the frequency 1340 kHz. The frequency change to 1240 kHz occurred early in its history, shortly after its 1948 sign-on.

In July 1949, less than a year after signing on, KELK faced a severe operational setback when an 80-mile-an-hour wind gust hit the station’s facility, causing the broadcast tower to collapse. Chief Engineer Van Welch reported that the station was able to resume broadcasting with a temporary antenna less than ten hours after the tower went down. A new 200-foot permanent tower was subsequently erected.

The station has long been under the banner of "Elko Broadcasting Company" (EBC). The company celebrated its 75th anniversary in December 2023, spanning three generations of local operation. In 2023, control of the station was transferred from Paul G. Gardner to 5T, LLC.

Logo before translator sign on

== Translator ==
Call sign	Frequency	City of license	FID	ERP (W)	HAAT	Class	FCC info
K240AI	95.9 FM	Carlin, Nevada	8878	230	323 m (1,060 ft)	D	LMS
