= KWNA (AM) =

KWXA
Winnemucca, Nevada; United States
- Frequency: 1400 kHz
- Branding: Pure Gold 1400 & 104.5

Programming
- Format: Defunct (was Classic rock)
- Affiliations: Westwood One

Ownership
- Owner: Isaac Diaz; (Fundacion Manitas Llenas, Inc.)
- Sister stations: KWNA-FM

History
- First air date: 1955
- Former call signs: KWNA (1955–2019)

Technical information
- Facility ID: 60046
- Class: C
- Power: 1,000 watts unlimited
- Transmitter coordinates: 40°57′53″N 117°42′50″W
- Translator: 92.1 K221AG (Winnemucca)

KWNA (1400 AM) was the call sign assigned from 1954 until 2019, and the last call sign used on the air, for radio station KWXA in Winnemucca, Nevada, United States. The station, while silent, was assigned the call letters KWXA by the Federal Communications Commission on March 16, 2019. However, its license was deleted on March 5, 2021, before making any broadcasts under the KWXA call letters.

== History ==
The station's history on 1400 kHz dates back to 1955. Before its final deletion, the station was briefly assigned the call letters KWXA by the FCC on March 16, 2019, but it did not return to the air under that designation.

The station's last known format under the KWNA call sign was a Classic Rock format. At various points, the station utilized programming from national syndicators, including Westwood One. The station was last owned by Fundacion Manitas Llenas, Inc., a non-profit organization whose principal was Isaac Diaz.

== Translator ==
In addition to the main signal, the station broadcast via a translator on the FM dial, licensed to Winnemucca. K221AG broadcast on 92.1 FM. The licenses for both KWXA and K221AG were cancelled on March 5, 2021, as the station had been off the air for over one year.
