= KLKO =

- Elko, Nevada; United States
- Broadcast area: Elko, Nevada
- Frequency: 93.7 MHz
- Branding: 93.7 Jack FM

Programming
- Format: Adult hits

Ownership
- Owner: Elko Broadcasting Company
- Sister stations: KELK

History
- First air date: 1981
- Call sign meaning: ELKO

Technical information
- Licensing authority: FCC
- Facility ID: 19370
- Class: C2
- ERP: 4,500 watts
- HAAT: 469 meters (1,539 ft)
- Transmitter coordinates: 40°55′20″N 115°50′56″W

Links
- Public license information: Public file; LMS
- Webcast: Listen Live
- Website: elkoradio.com

KLKO (93.7 FM, "93.7 Jack FM") is a radio station licensed to serve Elko, Nevada. The station is owned by Elko Broadcasting Company. It airs an adult hits music format. The station previously used the similarly themed "Bob FM" format, which is also an Adult Hits style that predates the "Jack FM" branding trend in the United States.

== History ==
KLKO first received its call sign assignment from the FCC and signed on the air in December 1981. The station is part of the Elko Broadcasting Company group, a multi-generational, locally-owned institution that has served the community since 1948.

KLKO is a Class C2 FM station, operating at 93.7 MHz with an effective radiated power (ERP) of 4,500 watts. Its antenna height above average terrain (HAAT) is 469 meters (1,539 ft), which provides widespread coverage across the Elko County area from a high elevation. Its transmitter is northwest of Elko near the Elko Snow Bowl ski area.
