= List of radio stations in Pennsylvania =

The following is a list of radio stations in the U.S. state of Pennsylvania, which can be sorted by their call signs, frequencies, cities of license, and formats.

== Stations ==
List of radio stations in Pennsylvania
Call sign	Frequency	City of license	Format	Notes
KDKA	1020 AM	Pittsburgh	Talk radio	
KDKA-FM	93.7 FM	Pittsburgh	Sports radio (ISN)	
KQV	1410 AM	Pittsburgh	Easy listening	
KYW	1060 AM	Philadelphia	All-news radio	
WAAF	910 AM	Scranton	Talk radio	(Note: Satellite of WILK-FM.)
WADV	940 AM	Lebanon	Southern gospel	
WAEB	790 AM	Allentown	Talk/sports	
WAEB-FM	104.1 FM	Allentown	Contemporary hits	
WAKZ	95.9 FM	Sharpsville	Mainstream urban	
WALY	100.1 FM	Altoona	Adult contemporary	
WAMO	660 AM	Wilkinsburg	Urban adult contemporary	
WANB	1210 AM	Waynesburg	Country	
WAOB	860 AM	Millvale	Catholic	
WAOB-FM	106.7 FM	Beaver Falls	Catholic	(Note: Satellite of WAOB.)
WARC	90.3 FM	Meadville	College/variety (Allegheny College)	
WARM	590 AM	Scranton	Classic hits	(Note: Satellite of WGMM.)
WARM-FM	103.3 FM	York	Adult contemporary	
WATS	960 AM	Sayre	Adult contemporary	
WAVT-FM	101.9 FM	Pottsville	Contemporary hits	
WAWN	89.5 FM	Franklin	Christian radio (AFR)	
WAYC	100.9 FM	Bedford	Hot adult contemporary	
WAYZ	101.5 FM	Waynesboro	Country	
WAZL	730 AM	Nanticoke	Tropical music	
WBBY-LP	100.3 FM	Berwick	Christian radio (Radio 74 Internationale)	
WBCB	1490 AM	Levittown	Talk/sports	
WBEB	101.1 FM	Philadelphia	Adult contemporary	
WBEN-FM	95.7 FM	Philadelphia	Adult hits	
WBFD	1310 AM	Bedford	Talk/sports	
WBGG	970 AM	Pittsburgh	Sports radio (FSR)	
WBGM	88.1 FM	New Berlin	Christian radio/CCM	
WBHB	92.1 FM	Mercersburg	Active rock	
WBHD	95.7 FM	Olyphant	Contemporary hits	
WBHT	97.1 FM	Mountain Top	Contemporary hits	
WBHV	1390 AM	State College	Adult top 40	
WBLF	970 AM	Bellefonte	Classic hits	
WBLJ-FM	95.3 FM	Shamokin	Country	
WBMR	91.7 FM	Telford	Christian radio	
WBPZ	1230 AM	Lock Haven	Classic hits	
WBRR	100.1 FM	Bradford	Mainstream rock	
WBRX	94.7 FM	Cresson	Adult contemporary	
WBSX	97.9 FM	Hazleton	Active rock	
WBTB-LP	107.9 FM	Erie	Christian radio	
WBUS	99.5 FM	Centre Hall	Classic rock	
WBUT	1050 AM	Butler	Country	
WBVE	107.5 FM	Bedford	Classic rock	
WBVP	1230 AM	Beaver Falls	Talk radio	
WBWE-LP	97.5 FM	Wilkes-Barre	Silent	
WBWX	1280 AM	Berwick	Adult top 40	
WBXQ	94.3 FM	Patton	Classic rock	
WBYH	89.1 FM	Hawley	Christian hot AC	(Note: Satellite of WBYO.)
WBYL	95.5 FM	Salladasburg	Country	
WBYN-FM	107.5 FM	Boyertown	Christian radio	
WBYO	88.9 FM	Sellersville	Christian hot AC	
WBYX	88.7 FM	Stroudsburg	Christian hot AC	
WBZD-FM	93.3 FM	Muncy	Classic hits	
WBZZ	100.7 FM	New Kensington	Adult top 40	
WCAL	91.9 FM	California	College/alternative (PennWest California)	
WCAT-FM	102.3 FM	Carlisle	Country	
WCCR-FM	92.7 FM	Clarion	Adult top 40	
WCCS	1160 AM	Homer City	Talk/sports	
WCDH	91.5 FM	Shenandoah	Christian radio (Family Life Network)	
WCDJ	91.3 FM	Tunkhannock	Christian radio (Family Life Network)	
WCDL	1440 AM	Carbondale	Oldies	
WCDM	106.7 FM	Hershey	Christian radio (Family Life Network)	
WCDN-FM	90.3 FM	Ridgebury	Christian radio (Family Life Network)	
WCDR	90.9 FM	Laporte	Christian radio (Family Life Network)	
WCDV-FM	90.1 FM	Trout Run	Christian radio (Family Life Network)	
WCED	1420 AM	DuBois	Talk/sports	
WCFT-FM	106.5 FM	Bloomsburg	Country	
WCGF-FM	104.3 FM	Moon Township	Christian radio (Family Life Network)	
WCGH	106.1 FM	Farmington Township	Christian radio (Family Life Network)	
WCGN	90.9 FM	Tidioute	Christian radio (Family Life Network)	
WCGT	88.7 FM	Clintonville	Christian radio (Family Life Network)	
WCGV	89.9 FM	Cambridge Springs	Christian radio (Family Life Network)	
WCHA	800 AM	Chambersburg	Oldies	
WCHE	1520 AM	West Chester	Alternative rock	
WCHX	105.5 FM	Lewistown	Mainstream rock	
WCLH	90.7 FM	Wilkes-Barre	College/alternative (Wilkes University)	
WCOA-FM	88.5 FM	Johnstown	Christian radio (Family Life Network)	
WCOB	88.3 FM	State College	Christian radio (Family Life Network)	
WCOG-FM	100.7 FM	Galeton	Christian radio (Family Life Network)	
WCOH	107.3 FM	DuBois	Christian radio (Family Life Network)	
WCOJ	1420 AM	Coatesville	Catholic (EWTN)	
WCOP	103.9 FM	Eldred	Christian radio (Family Life Network)	
WCOR-FM	96.7 FM	Lewis Run	Silent	
WCOX	91.1 FM	Bedford	Christian radio (Family Life Network)	
WCOZ	91.7 FM	New Albany	Catholic (EWTN)	
WCPA	900 AM	Clearfield	Classic hits	
WCRG	90.7 FM	Williamsburg	Christian contemporary	(Note: Satellite of WGRC.)
WCRO	1230 AM	Johnstown	Oldies	
WCSD-LP	104.9 FM	Shawnee-on-Delaware	Christian radio/variety	
WCTL	106.3 FM	Erie	Christian hot AC	
WCTO	96.1 FM	Easton	Country	
WCUC-FM	91.7 FM	Clarion	College/indie rock (Clarion State College)	
WCUR	91.7 FM	West Chester	College/variety (West Chester University)	
WCXR	103.7 FM	Lewisburg	Mainstream rock	
WCYJ-FM	99.5 FM	Waynesburg	College/hot AC (Waynesburg University)	
WDAC	94.5 FM	Lancaster	Christian radio	
WDAD	1450 AM	Indiana	Classic hits	
WDAS	1480 AM	Philadelphia	Sports radio (FSR)	
WDAS-FM	105.3 FM	Philadelphia	Urban adult contemporary	
WDBF-FM	106.3 FM	Mount Union	Country	
WDCV-FM	88.3 FM	Carlisle	College/variety (Dickinson College)	
WDDH	97.5 FM	St. Marys	Classic country	
WDIY	88.1 FM	Allentown	Public radio/community	
WDKC	101.5 FM	Covington	Country	
WDNH-FM	95.3 FM	Honesdale	Contemporary hits	
WDSN	106.5 FM	Reynoldsville	Adult contemporary	
WDSY-FM	107.9 FM	Pittsburgh	Country	
WDVE	102.5 FM	Pittsburgh	Classic rock	
WECZ	1540 AM	Punxsutawney	Country	
WEDO	810 AM	McKeesport	Variety	
WEEO-FM	103.7 FM	McConnellsburg	Talk radio	
WEEU	830 AM	Reading	Talk radio	
WEEX	1230 AM	Easton	Sports radio (FSR)	
WEFR	88.1 FM	Erie	Christian radio (Family Radio)	
WEGH	107.3 FM	Northumberland	Classic rock	
WEJL	630 AM	Scranton	Sports radio (FSR)	
WEJO-LP	104.7 FM	State College	Catholic	
WEJS	1600 AM	Jersey Shore	Classic country	
WEMA-LP	105.7 FM	Marlborough	Emergency info	
WEMK-LP	92.9 FM	Upper Gwynedd	Emergency info	
WEMQ-LP	92.1 FM	Horsham	Emergency info	
WEMR-LP	92.7 FM	Chambersburg	Campus/variety (Chambersburg Area School District)	
WEMZ-LP	105.7 FM	Plymouth	Emergency info	
WENI-FM	92.7 FM	South Waverly	Classic rock	
WERG	90.5 FM	Erie	College/variety (Gannon University)	
WERI	102.7 FM	Clarendon	Christian contemporary	
WESA	90.5 FM	Pittsburgh	Public radio	
WESB	1490 AM	Bradford	Full-service	
WESD	92.1 FM	Ellwood City	Christian radio (Family Life Network)	
WESS	90.3 FM	East Stroudsburg	College/variety (East Stroudsburg University)	
WEST	1400 AM	Easton	Rhythmic contemporary	
WEVB-LP	99.1 FM	Hazleton	Spanish Christian radio	
WEVW	90.9 FM	Elysburg	Christian hot AC	
WEZX	106.9 FM	Scranton	Classic rock	
WFBA	90.5 FM	Kulpmont	Gospel music	(Note: Satellite of WFBM.)
WFBG	1290 AM	Altoona	Adult top 40	
WFBM	90.5 FM	Beaver Springs	Gospel music	
WFBV	90.1 FM	Selinsgrove	Gospel music	
WFGE	101.1 FM	State College	Country	
WFGI	940 AM	Charleroi	Country	
WFGI-FM	95.5 FM	Johnstown	Country	
WFGY	98.1 FM	Altoona	Country	
WFIL	560 AM	Philadelphia	Christian radio (SRN)	
WFKJ	890 AM	Cashtown	Christian radio	
WFNM	89.1 FM	Lancaster	College/variety (Franklin & Marshall College)	
WFNN	1330 AM	Erie	Sports radio (FSR)	
WFRA	1450 AM	Franklin	Adult top 40	
WFRM	600 AM	Coudersport	Adult standards	
WFSE	88.9 FM	Edinboro	College/alternative (Edinboro University)	
WFSJ-LP	103.7 FM	Indiana	Christian contemporary	
WFUZ	1240 AM	Wilkes-Barre	Classic rock	
WFVY	100.1 FM	Lebanon	Country	
WFXS	98.7 FM	Pleasant Gap	Sports radio (FSR)	
WFYL	1180 AM	King of Prussia	Talk radio	
WGBN	1360 AM	McKeesport	Gospel	
WGET	1320 AM	Gettysburg	Adult contemporary	
WGGI	990 AM	Somerset	Country	
WGGT-LP	92.9 FM	Philadelphia	Variety	
WGGY	101.3 FM	Scranton	Country	
WGJC	97.1 FM	University Park	Christian contemporary	
WGMA	1490 AM	Hazleton	Classic hits	
WGMF	750 AM	Olyphant	Classic hits	
WGMF-FM	103.9 FM	Dushore	Classic hits	
WGMM	1460 AM	Tunkhannock	Classic hits	
WGPA	1100 AM	Bethlehem	Full-service	
WGRC	91.3 FM	Lewisburg	Christian contemporary	
WGRP	940 AM	Greenville	Hot adult contemporary	
WGTY	107.7 FM	Gettysburg	Country	
WGYI	98.5 FM	Oil City	Country	
WGYY	100.3 FM	Meadville	Country	
WHAT	1340 AM	Philadelphia	Spanish contemporary hits	
WHBI-LP	93.1 FM	Grantville	Variety	
WHGB	1400 AM	Harrisburg	Sports radio (ESPN)	
WHGL-FM	100.3 FM	Canton	Country	
WHHN	88.1 FM	Hollidaysburg	Catholic (Radio Maria)	
WHHS	99.9 FM	Havertown	Campus (Haverford High School)	
WHII-LP	106.5 FM	Warminster	Ethnic/Russian	
WHJB	107.1 FM	Greensburg	Classic hits	
WHKF	99.3 FM	Harrisburg	Mainstream urban	
WHKS	94.9 FM	Port Allegany	Adult contemporary	
WHLM	930 AM	Bloomsburg	Classic rock	
WHMJ	99.3 FM	Franklin	Classic hits	
WHMN-LP	107.3 FM	Plymouth	Christian radio (Radio 74 Internationale)	
WHNA	92.3 FM	Riverside	Classic hits	
WHOL	1600 AM	Allentown	Rhythmic contemporary	(Note: Satellite of WEST.)
WHP	580 AM	Harrisburg	Talk radio	
WHSK	91.1 FM	Bloomsburg	College/variety (Bloomsburg University)	
WHUN	1150 AM	Huntingdon	Classic hits	(Note: Satellite of WOWY-FM.)
WHUN-FM	103.5 FM	Huntingdon	Classic hits	
WHVR	1280 AM	Hanover	Adult contemporary	
WHYF	720 AM	Shiremanstown	Catholic (EWTN)	
WHYL	960 AM	Carlisle	Oldies	
WHYP-LP	98.9 FM	Corry	Alternative	
WHYU-FM	89.1 FM	Meyersdale	Full-service	
WHYY-FM	90.9 FM	Philadelphia	Public radio	
WIBF	92.5 FM	Mexico	Country	
WICK	1400 AM	Scranton	Oldies	
WICU	1310 AM	Warren	Contemporary hits	
WICU-FM	92.7 FM	Lawrence Park	Contemporary hits	
WIFT	102.1 FM	DuBois	Country	
WIKG	1380 AM	Waynesboro	Contemporary hits	
WIKZ	95.1 FM	Chambersburg	Adult contemporary	
WILK	980 AM	Wilkes-Barre	Talk radio	
WILK-FM	103.1 FM	Avoca	Talk radio	
WILQ	105.1 FM	Williamsport	Country	
WIOO	1000 AM	Carlisle	Classic country	
WIOQ	102.1 FM	Philadelphia	Contemporary hits	
WIOV-FM	105.1 FM	Ephrata	Country	
WIP-FM	94.1 FM	Philadelphia	Sports radio (ISN)	
WISP	1570 AM	Doylestown	Catholic (EWTN)	
WISR	680 AM	Butler	Full-service	
WITF-FM	89.5 FM	Harrisburg	Public radio	
WITK	1550 AM	Pittston	Christian radio	
WIUP-FM	90.1 FM	Indiana	College/variety (Indiana University of Pennsylvania)	
WIXQ	91.7 FM	Millersville	College/variety (Millersville University)	
WJAS	1320 AM	Pittsburgh	Talk radio	
WJAZ	91.7 FM	Summerdale	Public radio/classical/jazz	(Note: Satellite of WRTI.)
WJCS	89.3 FM	Allentown	Christian radio	
WJET	1400 AM	Erie	Talk radio	
WJFA	910 AM	Apollo	Conservative talk	(Note: Satellite of WJFG.)
WJFG	1480 AM	Latrobe	Conservative talk	
WJFP	740 AM	Chester	Conservative talk	
WJHT	92.1 FM	Johnstown	Adult top 40	
WJKB	105.1 FM	Sheffield	Christian contemporary (K-Love)	
WJLW-LP	100.3 FM	Greensburg	Christian radio	
WJNG	100.5 FM	Johnsonburg	Modern/Classic rock	
WJOB-FM	93.3 FM	Susquehanna	Urban contemporary	
WJPA	1450 AM	Washington	Classic hits	
WJPA-FM	95.3 FM	Washington	Classic hits	
WJRC	90.9 FM	Lewistown	Christian contemporary	
WJRH	104.9 FM	Easton	College/free-form (Lafayette College)	
WJSA-FM	96.3 FM	Jersey Shore	Christian radio/CCM	
WJSM	1110 AM	Martinsburg	Christian radio/Southern gospel	
WJSM-FM	92.7 FM	Martinsburg	Christian radio/Southern gospel	
WJTL	90.3 FM	Lancaster	Christian contemporary	
WJUN	1220 AM	Mexico	Classic rock	
WJVM	90.3 FM	Bellefonte	Catholic	
WJYN-LP	98.5 FM	North Philadelphia	Variety	
WKBI	1400 AM	St. Marys	Talk radio	
WKBI-FM	93.9 FM	St. Marys	Contemporary hits	
WKBO	1230 AM	Harrisburg	Christian contemporary	
WKBP	95.9 FM	Benton	Christian contemporary (K-Love)	
WKCV-LP	103.5 FM	La Plume	College/variety (Keystone College)	
WKDN	950 AM	Philadelphia	Christian radio (Family Radio)	
WKDU	91.7 FM	Philadelphia	College/free-form (Drexel University)	
WKFB	770 AM	Jeannette	Oldies	
WKFO	1380 AM	Kittanning	Classic hits	
WKFT	101.3 FM	Strattanville	Classic country	
WKGO	88.1 FM	Murrysville	Easy listening	
WKHB	620 AM	Irwin	Full-service	
WKHL	92.1 FM	Palmyra	Christian contemporary (K-Love)	
WKHW	88.5 FM	Halifax	Christian contemporary (K-Love)	
WKMC	1370 AM	Roaring Spring	Classic country	
WKOK	1070 AM	Sunbury	Talk/sports	
WKPA	107.9 FM	Port Matilda	Christian contemporary (K-Love)	
WKPS	90.7 FM	State College	College (Pennsylvania State University)	
WKQL	103.3 FM	Brookville	Classic hits	
WKQW	1120 AM	Oil City	Sports radio (FSR)	
WKRF	107.9 FM	Tobyhanna	Contemporary hits	
WKRZ	98.5 FM	Freeland	Contemporary hits	
WKSB	102.7 FM	Williamsport	Adult contemporary	
WKST	1280 AM	New Castle	Classic country	
WKST-FM	96.1 FM	Pittsburgh	Contemporary hits	
WKTW-LP	107.1 FM	Lenhartsville	Variety	
WKVA	920 AM	Lewistown	Gold-based soft AC	
WKVE	103.1 FM	Mount Pleasant	Album-oriented rock	
WKWP	88.1 FM	Williamsport	Christian contemporary (K-Love)	
WKYE	96.5 FM	Johnstown	Adult contemporary	
WLAN-FM	96.9 FM	Lancaster	Contemporary hits	
WLBR	1270 AM	Lebanon	Classic hits	
WLBS	91.7 FM	Bristol	Variety	
WLCH	1440 AM	Manchester Township	Spanish contemporary hits	
WLCH-FM	91.3 FM	Lancaster	Spanish talk/variety	
WLCY	106.3 FM	Blairsville	Country	
WLDJ-LP	107.5 FM	New Castle	Variety	
WLEB-LP	93.1 FM	Lebanon	Christian radio	
WLEJ	1450 AM	State College	Classic country	
WLEM	1250 AM	Emporium	Classic hits	
WLER-FM	97.7 FM	Butler	Mainstream rock	
WLEV	100.7 FM	Allentown	Adult contemporary	
WLGD	107.7 FM	Dallas	Classic rock	
WLGJ	1260 AM	Philipsburg	Classic country	(Note: Satellite of WLEJ.)
WLHI	90.3 FM	Schnecksville	Christian hot AC	
WLIH	107.1 FM	Whitneyville	Christian radio	
WLKA	88.3 FM	Tafton	Christian contemporary (K-Love)	
WLKE	93.5 FM	Gallitzin	Christian contemporary (K-Love)	
WLKH	97.7 FM	Somerset	Christian contemporary (K-Love)	
WLKJ	105.7 FM	Portage	Christian contemporary (K-Love)	
WLLF	96.7 FM	Mercer	Sports radio (ISN)	
WLMZ	1300 AM	West Hazleton	Spanish tropical music	
WLMZ-FM	102.3 FM	Pittston	Spanish tropical music	
WLOA	1470 AM	Farrell	Rhythmic contemporary	
WLOQ	96.3 FM	Oil City	Christian contemporary (K-Love)	
WLRF	107.1 FM	Greenville	Christian contemporary (K-Love)	
WLSH	1410 AM	Lansford	Adult standards	
WLSW	103.9 FM	Scottdale	Adult contemporary	
WLTJ	92.9 FM	Pittsburgh	Hot adult contemporary	
WLUI	670 AM	Lewistown	Oldies	
WLVR-FM	91.3 FM	Bethlehem	Public radio (Lehigh University)	
WLYC	1050 AM	Williamsport	Classic rock	
WMBA	1460 AM	Ambridge	Country/rock	
WMBS	590 AM	Uniontown	Full-service	
WMCE-FM	88.5 FM	Erie	Classic hits	
WMES-LP	107.7 FM	Altoona	Catholic	
WMGH-FM	105.5 FM	Tamaqua	Adult contemporary	
WMGK	102.9 FM	Philadelphia	Classic rock	
WMGS	92.9 FM	Wilkes-Barre	Adult contemporary	
WMGW	1490 AM	Meadville	Adult top 40	
WMKX	105.5 FM	Brookville	Modern/Classic rock	
WMLP	1380 AM	Milton	Talk/sports	
WMMH	91.9 FM	Houtzdale	Catholic (EWTN)	
WMMR	93.3 FM	Philadelphia	Active rock	
WMMZ	103.5 FM	Berwick	Classic hits	
WMNY	1150 AM	New Kensington	Hindi/South Asian	
WMRF-FM	95.7 FM	Lewistown	Hot adult contemporary	
WMSS	91.1 FM	Middletown	Campus (Middletown Area School District)	
WMTT-FM	94.7 FM	Tioga	Classic rock	
WMUG-LP	105.1 FM	Indiana	Christian radio	
WMUH	91.7 FM	Allentown	College/variety (Muhlenberg College)	
WMVL	101.7 FM	Linesville	Classic hits	
WNAE	104.3 FM	Clarendon	Country	
WNBT-FM	104.5 FM	Wellsboro	Country	
WNDA	1490 AM	Wellsboro	Classic hits	
WNJR	91.7 FM	Washington	College (Washington & Jefferson College)	
WNKV	103.5 FM	Burgettstown	Christian contemporary (K-Love)	
WNLI	94.5 FM	State College	Contemporary worship (Air1)	
WNNA	106.1 FM	Beaver Springs	Classic hits	
WNNK-FM	104.1 FM	Harrisburg	Hot adult contemporary	
WNPV	1440 AM	Lansdale	Classic hits	
WNTE	89.5 FM	Mansfield	College/variety (Mansfield University)	
WNTJ	1490 AM	Johnstown	Classic hits	
WNTP	990 AM	Philadelphia	Conservative talk	
WNUW-LP	98.5 FM	Aston	College/AAA (Neumann University)	
WNUZ-LP	92.9 FM	Gap	Community/talk (Pacifica)	
WNWR	1540 AM	Philadelphia	Christian radio	
WODE-FM	99.9 FM	Easton	Classic rock	
WOGA	92.3 FM	Mansfield	Classic hits	
WOGG	94.9 FM	Oliver	Country	
WOGL	98.1 FM	Philadelphia	Classic hits	
WOKW	102.9 FM	Curwensville	Adult contemporary	
WOLR-LP	98.9 FM	Williamsport	Christian radio	
WOOM-LP	92.9 FM	Philadelphia	Variety	
WORD-FM	101.5 FM	Pittsburgh	Christian radio (SRN)	
WOTH	107.9 FM	Williamsport	Contemporary hits	
WOWQ	101.7 FM	Central City	Classic hits	
WOWY	103.1 FM	State College	Classic hits	
WOYK	1350 AM	York	Sports radio (FSR)	
WPAI	90.7 FM	Nanty Glo	Contemporary worship (Air1)	
WPAU	91.5 FM	Palmyra Township	Public radio	(Note: Satellite of WVIA-FM.)
WPAZ	1370 AM	Pottstown	Christian radio	
WPCL	97.3 FM	Spangler	Christian radio	(Note: Satellite of WTLR.)
WPCO	840 AM	Stroudsburg	Classic hits	
WPDC	1600 AM	Elizabethtown	Oldies	
WPEB	88.1 FM	Philadelphia	Variety	
WPEL	800 AM	Montrose	Southern gospel	
WPEL-FM	96.5 FM	Montrose	Christian radio/Easy listening	
WPFG	91.3 FM	Carlisle	Christian radio	
WPGB	104.7 FM	Pittsburgh	Country	
WPGM	1570 AM	Danville	Christian radio	
WPGM-FM	96.7 FM	Danville	Christian radio	
WPGP	1250 AM	Pittsburgh	Conservative talk	
WPGR	1510 AM	Monroeville	Catholic	
WPHE	690 AM	Phoenixville	Spanish Christian radio	
WPHI-FM	103.9 FM	Jenkintown	All-news radio	(Note: Satellite of KYW.)
WPHT	1210 AM	Philadelphia	Talk radio	
WPIC	790 AM	Sharon	Talk radio	
WPIT	730 AM	Pittsburgh	Christian radio (SRN)	
WPKL	99.3 FM	Uniontown	Classic hits	
WPKV	98.3 FM	Duquesne	Christian contemporary (K-Love)	
WPNJ	90.5 FM	Easton	Variety	
WPPA	1360 AM	Pottsville	Full-service	
WPPM-LP	106.5 FM	Philadelphia	Variety	
WPPY	92.7 FM	Starview	Adult contemporary	
WPQP	93.1 FM	Clearfield	Adult top 40	
WPSE	1450 AM	Erie	Business news	
WPSN	1590 AM	Honesdale	Talk radio	
WPSU	91.5 FM	State College	Public radio (NPR)	
WPSX	90.1 FM	Kane	Public radio (NPR)	(Note: Satellite of WPSU-FM.)
WPTS-FM	92.1 FM	Pittsburgh	College (University of Pittsburgh)	
WPXZ-FM	104.1 FM	Punxsutawney	Adult contemporary	
WPZX	105.9 FM	Pocono Pines	Classic rock	
WQBG	100.5 FM	Elizabethville	Country	
WQBR	99.9 FM	Avis	Country/Americana	
WQCM	94.3 FM	Greencastle	Classic rock	
WQED-FM	89.3 FM	Pittsburgh	Classical	
WQEJ	89.7 FM	Johnstown	Classical	(Note: Satellite of WQED-FM.)
WQEW-LP	98.5 FM	Philadelphia	Ethnic/Chinese	
WQFM	92.1 FM	Nanticoke	Classic hits	
WQFN	100.1 FM	Forest City	Classic hits	
WQFX-FM	103.1 FM	Russell	Classic rock	
WQHE	88.3 FM	Oil City	Catholic	
WQHZ	102.3 FM	Erie	Classic rock	
WQJU	107.1 FM	Mifflintown	Christian radio	
WQKX	94.1 FM	Sunbury	Contemporary hits	
WQKY	98.9 FM	Emporium	Classic hits	
WQLN-FM	91.3 FM	Erie	Public radio	
WQLV	98.9 FM	Millersburg	Hot adult contemporary	
WQMU	92.5 FM	Indiana	Hot adult contemporary	
WQOR	90.5 FM	Laceyville	Catholic (EWTN)	
WQQP	95.9 FM	Sykesville	Adult top 40	
WQSU	88.9 FM	Selinsgrove	College (Susquehanna University)	
WQWK	105.9 FM	Philipsburg	Active rock	
WQWY	103.9 FM	Bellwood	Classic hits	
WQXA-FM	105.7 FM	York	Active rock	
WRAK	1400 AM	Williamsport	Talk radio	
WRAW	1340 AM	Reading	Conservative talk	
WRAX	1600 AM	Bedford	Adult standards	
WRBG	98.3 FM	Mifflinburg	Country	
WRBT	94.9 FM	Harrisburg	Country	
WRCT	88.3 FM	Pittsburgh	Community/free-form (Pacifica)	
WRDD	1480 AM	Shippensburg	Country	
WRDV	89.3 FM	Warminster	Big band/Oldies	
WRDY-LP	106.5 FM	Eagleville	Emergency info	
WRFF	104.5 FM	Philadelphia	Alternative rock	
WRFY-FM	102.5 FM	Reading	Adult contemporary	
WRGG-LP	93.7 FM	Greencastle	Oldies	
WRGN	88.1 FM	Sweet Valley	Christian radio/CCM	
WRGU-LP	92.9 FM	Philadelphia	Community/free-form (Pacifica)	
WRHB-LP	105.9 FM	Mifflinville	Variety	
WRIE	1260 AM	Erie	Sports radio (CBS)	
WRKC	88.5 FM	Wilkes-Barre	College/variety (King's College)	
WRKK	1200 AM	Hughesville	Active rock	
WRKT	104.9 FM	North East	Active rock	
WRKW	99.1 FM	Ebensburg	Classic rock	
WRKY	1490 AM	Lancaster	Contemporary Christian	
WRKY-FM	104.9 FM	Hollidaysburg	Classic rock	
WRLC	91.7 FM	Williamsport	College (Lycoming College)	
WRLD	1240 AM	Reading	Urban contemporary	
WRLG-LP	92.9 FM	Philadelphia	Contemporary hits/Classic hits/Modern AC	
WRNB	100.3 FM	Media	Urban adult contemporary	
WROZ	101.3 FM	Lancaster	Contemporary worship (Air1)	
WRPV	91.1 FM	Ridgway	Christian contemporary	(Note: Satellite of WRXV.)
WRQI	94.3 FM	Saegertown	Classic rock	
WRQV	88.1 FM	Ridgway	Christian contemporary	
WRQW	107.7 FM	Cooperstown	Classic rock	
WRRK	96.9 FM	Braddock	Adult hits	
WRRN	92.3 FM	Warren	Classic hits	
WRSC-FM	95.3 FM	Bellefonte	Talk radio	
WRSD	94.9 FM	Folsom	Campus/variety (Ridley School District)	
WRTA	1240 AM	Altoona	Talk radio	
WRTI	90.1 FM	Philadelphia	Public radio/classical/jazz	
WRTJ	89.3 FM	Coatesville	Public radio/classical/jazz	
WRTL	90.7 FM	Ephrata	Public radio/classical/jazz	
WRTS	103.7 FM	Erie	Contemporary hits	
WRTY	91.1 FM	Jackson Township	Public radio/classical/jazz	
WRVI	90.5 FM	Allport	Christian contemporary	
WRVV	97.3 FM	Harrisburg	Classic rock	
WRXV	89.1 FM	State College	Christian contemporary	
WRYV	88.7 FM	Milroy	Christian contemporary	
WRZO-LP	102.9 FM	Chambersburg	Album-oriented rock	
WSAJ-FM	91.1 FM	Grove City	College (Grove City College)	
WSAN	1470 AM	Allentown	Oldies	
WSBA	910 AM	York	Talk radio	
WSBG	93.5 FM	Stroudsburg	Hot adult contemporary	
WSFX	89.1 FM	Nanticoke	College/AAA (Luzerne County Community College)	
WSHH	99.7 FM	Pittsburgh	Adult contemporary	
WSJR	93.7 FM	Dallas	Country	
WSKE	104.3 FM	Everett	Country	
WSOV-LP	101.7 FM	Millheim	Variety	
WSOX	96.1 FM	Red Lion	Classic hits	
WSQV	92.1 FM	Lock Haven	Classic rock	
WSRN-FM	91.5 FM	Swarthmore	College/variety (Swarthmore College)	
WSRU	88.1 FM	Slippery Rock	College (Slippery Rock University)	
WSYC-FM	88.7 FM	Shippensburg	College/AAA (Shippensburg University)	
WTDY-FM	96.5 FM	Philadelphia	Country music	
WTEL	610 AM	Philadelphia	Black Information Network	
WTIO	88.3 FM	Mainesburg	Public radio	
WTIV	1230 AM	Titusville	Classic hits	
WTKT	1460 AM	Harrisburg	Sports radio (FSR)	
WTKZ	1320 AM	Allentown	Spanish contemporary hits	
WTLR	89.9 FM	State College	Christian radio	
WTNA	1430 AM	Altoona	Classic hits	
WTPA-FM	93.5 FM	Mechanicsburg	Classic rock	
WTRN	1340 AM	Tyrone	Classic hits	
WTRW	94.3 FM	Carbondale	Talk radio	
WTTC-FM	95.3 FM	Towanda	Classic rock	
WTWF	93.9 FM	Fairview	Country	
WTWT	90.5 FM	Bradford	Christian contemporary	
WTXW	1550 AM	Towanda	Adult top 40	
WTZN	1310 AM	Troy	Oldies	
WUKL	106.9 FM	Masontown	Christian contemporary (K-Love)	
WUMR	106.1 FM	Philadelphia	Spanish contemporary hits	
WURD	900 AM	Philadelphia	Talk radio	
WUSL	98.9 FM	Philadelphia	Mainstream urban	
WUSR	99.5 FM	Scranton	College/variety (University of Scranton)	
WUTT-LP	95.5 FM	Erie	Contemporary hits/Modern AC	
WUUK-LP	105.7 FM	Canadohta Lake	Classic hits	
WUZZ	1200 AM	New Castle	Classic hits	
WVBU-FM	90.5 FM	Lewisburg	Alternative rock	
WVHO-LP	94.5 FM	Nanticoke	Christian rock	
WVIA-FM	89.9 FM	Scranton	Public radio	
WVIP	100.5 FM	Susquehanna	Oldies	
WVLH-LP	106.7 FM	Coudersport	Christian radio (3ABN)	
WVLY-FM	100.9 FM	Milton	Adult contemporary	
WVME	91.9 FM	Meadville	Christian radio (Moody Radio)	
WVMM	90.7 FM	Grantham	Christian radio	
WVMN	90.1 FM	New Castle	Christian radio (Moody Radio)	
WVMW-FM	91.7 FM	Scranton	College/alternative (Marywood University)	
WVNW	96.7 FM	Burnham	Country	
WVPO	96.7 FM	Lehman Township	Country	
WVRT	97.7 FM	Mill Hall	Contemporary hits	
WVRZ	99.7 FM	Mount Carmel	Contemporary hits	
WVSQ	106.9 FM	Renovo	Classic rock	
WVYA	89.7 FM	Williamsport	Public radio	
WVYC	88.1 FM	York	College/free-form (York College of Pennsylvania)	
WVZN	1580 AM	Columbia	Spanish Christian radio	
WWCB	1370 AM	Corry	Classic hits	
WWCF	88.7 FM	McConnellsburg	Variety	
WWCH	1300 AM	Clarion	Classic country	
WWCS	540 AM	Canonsburg	Brokered programming	
WWDB	860 AM	Philadelphia	Brokered programming	
WWEC	88.3 FM	Elizabethtown	College/variety (Elizabethtown College)	
WWIZ	103.9 FM	West Middlesex	Adult contemporary	
WWLU	88.7 FM	Lincoln University	College/urban (Lincoln University)	
WWNL	1080 AM	Pittsburgh	Christian radio	
WWNW	88.9 FM	New Wilmington	College/adult contemporary (Westminster College)	
WWPA	1340 AM	Williamsport	Talk radio	
WWPJ	89.5 FM	Pen Argyl	Classical music	
WWRR	104.9 FM	Scranton	Classic hits	
WWSW-FM	94.5 FM	Pittsburgh	Classic hits	
WWUC-LP	96.7 FM	Union City	Variety	
WXAC	91.3 FM	Reading	College (Albright College)	
WXBB	94.7 FM	Erie	Adult hits	
WXCS-LP	92.9 FM	Cambridge Springs	Variety	
WXDX-FM	105.9 FM	Pittsburgh	Alternative rock/Sports	
WXED-LP	107.3 FM	Ellwood City	Variety	
WXKC	99.9 FM	Erie	Adult contemporary	
WXMJ	104.5 FM	Cambridge Springs	Classic hits	
WXMT	106.3 FM	Smethport	Classic hits	
WXPH	88.7 FM	Middletown	Adult album alternative	(Note: Satellite of WXPN.)
WXPI	88.5 FM	Jersey Shore	Community/free-form (Pacifica)	
WXPM-LP	98.5 FM	Phoenixville	Oldies	
WXPN	88.5 FM	Philadelphia	Adult album alternative	
WXTA	97.9 FM	Edinboro	Country	
WXTC	88.1 FM	Greenville	College/variety (Thiel College)	
WXTU	92.5 FM	Philadelphia	Country	
WXVE	1570 AM	Latrobe	Adult contemporary	
WXVU	89.1 FM	Villanova	College/variety (Villanova University)	
WXZY-LP	101.7 FM	Kane	Variety	
WYBQ	88.3 FM	Leesport	Christian radio (BBN)	
WYCK	1340 AM	Plains	Classic hits	
WYCO-LP	106.1 FM	York	Variety	
WYCR	98.5 FM	York-Hanover	Classic rock	
WYCY	105.3 FM	Hawley	Classic hits	
WYEP-FM	91.3 FM	Pittsburgh	Adult album alternative	
WYFM	102.9 FM	Sharon	Classic rock	
WYFU	88.5 FM	Masontown	Christian radio (BBN)	
WYLE	95.1 FM	Grove City	Classic country	
WYNY	1450 AM	Milford	Adult contemporary	
WYPM	93.3 FM	Chambersburg	Public radio	(Note: Satellite of WITF-FM.)
WYRA	98.5 FM	Confluence	Contemporary worship (Air1)	
WYSP	88.1 FM	Dushore	Country	
WYTL	91.7 FM	Wyomissing	Christian hot AC	
WYUP	1400 AM	Loretto	Adult hits	
WYVL	88.5 FM	Youngsville	Christian contemporary	
WYYC	1250 AM	York	Christian radio	
WZBF	96.9 FM	Ridgebury	Country	
WZBT	91.1 FM	Gettysburg	College/AAA (Gettysburg College)	
WZML-LP	92.9 FM	Bryn Mawr	Variety	
WZMV	89.1 FM	Mohrsville	Christian hot AC	
WZRG	91.9 FM	Kulpmont	Christian hot AC	
WZTE	1530 AM	Union City	Talk radio	
WZUM	1550 AM	Braddock	Jazz	
WZWG	91.7 FM	West Grove	Christian radio	
WZWW	93.7 FM	Boalsburg	Hot adult contemporary	
WZXB	90.5 FM	Bechtelsville	Christian hot AC	
WZXE	88.3 FM	East Nottingham	Christian hot AC	
WZXM	88.1 FM	Harrisburg	Christian hot AC	
WZXN	90.1 FM	Newburg	Christian hot AC	
WZXQ	88.3 FM	Chambersburg	Christian hot AC	
WZXR	99.3 FM	South Williamsport	Mainstream rock	
WZXY	90.7 FM	Spring Grove	Christian hot AC	
WZZD	88.1 FM	Warwick	Christian hot AC	
WZZH	90.9 FM	Honesdale	Christian hot AC	
WZZO	95.1 FM	Bethlehem	Active rock	

== Defunct ==
- WASP
- WBEM
- WBGI
- WBIT-LP
- WBYN
- WDNR
- WFBM-LP
- WFTE
- WGEV
- WHYU-LP
- WHZN
- WISL
- WJMW
- WKVR-FM
- WKZV
- WLAN
- WLOG
- WNAP
- WNCC
- WOYL
- WPAM
- WPLY
- WPWA
- WQLE
- WQDD-LP
- WQZS
- WRDD
- WSAJ
- WTAC
- WTGC
- WVSL
- WWSM
- WYBF
- WZSK
- WZUM
- WZZE
