= WGYY =

Radio station in Meadville, Pennsylvania

WGYY and WGYI

WGYY: Meadville, Pennsylvania; WGYI: Oil City, Pennsylvania; United States
- Broadcast area: Northwestern Pennsylvania
- Frequencies: WGYY: 100.3 MHz; WGYI: 98.5 MHz
- Branding: Froggy 100.3 and 98.5

Programming
- Format: Country
- Affiliations: Westwood One

Ownership
- Owner: Seven Mountains Media; (Southern Belle Media Family, LLC)
- Sister stations: WFRA, WHMJ, WUZZ, WKST, WMGW, WRQI, WRQW, WTIV, WXMJ, WYLE

History
- Former call signs: WGYI: WOYL-FM (1999–2000)

Technical information
- Licensing authority: FCC
- Facility ID: WGYY: 24940; WGYI: 21421
- Class: WGYY: B; WGYI: B1
- ERP: WGYY: 20,000 watts; WGYI: 20,000 watts
- HAAT: WGYY: 179 meters (587 ft); WGYI: 91 meters (299 ft)
- Transmitter coordinates: WGYY: 41°37′53.1″N 80°10′36.2″W; WGYI: 41°25′4.2″N 79°42′52.2″W

Links
- Public license information: WGYY: Public file; LMS; WGYI: Public file; LMS
- Webcast: Listen Live
- Website: listentofroggy.com

WGYY (100.3 FM) and WGYI (98.5 FM), branded as Froggy 100.3 and 98.5, are commercial radio stations in Crawford County in Northwestern Pennsylvania, United States. Both stations simulcast a country music radio format and are owned by Seven Mountains Media, through licensee Southern Belle Media Family, LLC. WGYY is licensed to Meadville, Pennsylvania and WGYI is licensed to Oil City, Pennsylvania.

== History ==
=== 100.3 WGYY ===
WGYY signed on the air in 1948 as WMGW-FM, the first FM radio station in Crawford County. It was founded by Meadville physician Dr. Harry C. Winslow. Dr. Winslow chose his daughter's initials (Mary Grace Winslow) for the station's call letters. WMGW-FM was co-owned with AM 1490 WMGW. For the first three decades, WMGW and WMGW-FM mostly simulcast their programming.

Like many small-town radio stations, WMGW-AM-FM broadcast a full service radio format through the 1960s, 70s and 80s, consisting of local, world and national news, local and Pittsburgh sports, and adult contemporary music. World and national news was provided by ABC News and the Associated Press radio network.

In the early 1970s, WMGW-AM-FM were purchased by the Regional Broadcasters Group headquartered in Kingston, New York. The FM station's call sign was changed to WZPR as a tribute to Meadville's Talon Corporation which, nearly a century earlier, had become America's first manufacturer of "hookless fasteners" or zippers. While WMGW's AM format remained the same, WZPR changed to automated beautiful music, playing quarter hour sweeps of mostly instrumental cover versions of popular songs.

In 1978, WZPR switched to its current format, country music, eventually taking the WGYY call sign.

=== 98.5 WGYI ===
On May 1, 1957, WGYI signed on the air. Its original call sign was WDJR and its effective radiated power was 3,400 watts. It mostly simulcast its AM sister station, AM 1340 WKRZ (now 1120 kHz WKQW). WKRZ and WDJR were owned by WKRZ, Inc. and carried programming from NBC Radio.

== Sale to Seven Mountains Media ==
It was announced on October 12, 2022 that Forever Media was selling 34 stations, including WGYY/WGYI and the entire Meadville/Franklin cluster, to State College-based Seven Mountains Media for $17.375 million. The deal closed on January 1, 2023.
