= WKQW =

WKQW may refer to:

- WKQW (AM), a radio station (1120 AM) licensed to serve Oil City, Pennsylvania, United States
- WLOQ, a radio station (96.3 FM) licensed to serve Oil City, Pennsylvania, which held the call sign WKQW-FM from 1992 to 2022
