= WOYL =

- Oil City, Pennsylvania; United States
- Frequency: 1340 kHz

Ownership
- Owner: Forever Broadcasting

History
- First air date: February 14, 1946
- Last air date: December 27, 2009
- Former call signs: WKRZ (1946–1977)
- Call sign meaning: Oil City (city of license)

Technical information
- Class: C
- Power: 1,000 watts (unlimited)

WOYL was an American radio station, licensed to the community of Oil City, Pennsylvania. WOYL operated at the assigned frequency of 1340 kHz and a full-time output power of a thousand watts.

WOYL signed off December 27, 2009, due to major technical difficulties; though the station acquired a special temporary extension that allowed the station to remain silent until June 2010, it was ultimately decided to return the WOYL license to the Federal Communications Commission (FCC).

Though licensed to Oil City, some programming, sales and administrative functions did not originate out of Oil City, but rather Meadville, Pennsylvania, the headquarters of Forever Broadcasting's other northwest Pennsylvania broadcast properties.

WOYL was owned and operated by Forever Broadcasting, LLC, which also owned its primary programming vehicle, the Allegheny News Talk Sports Network, which remained in operation.

== History ==
WOYL was the first radio station located in Venango County, debuting on February 14, 1946, on a "local" frequency of 1340 kHz, while the area was still in its oil-drilling and oil-producing heyday. The station's original call letters were WKRZ.

Most stations broadcasting on local frequencies operated as fulltime stations, with single tower non-directional antennas. WKRZ was unusual for having a two-tower daytime directional antenna pattern, as well as a share-time arrangement—it would sign off from 7:00-8:30 PM on Tuesdays and Thursdays and 7:00-8:00 PM on Sundays—to allow operation by WSAJ Grove City College, that was mandated by the Federal Communications Commission (FCC). The FCC later determined, however, that WOYL did not cause interference to WSAJ and eliminated the "shared time" restrictions, though WOYL continued to operate using the same directional pattern to protect WKSN in Jamestown, New York and WSTV in Steubenville, Ohio, which also operated on 1340 kHz.

Like most small-market AM radio stations, WKRZ programmed a format of full-service news, sports, and adult contemporary music, with world and national news provided by the NBC radio network (it originally affiliated itself with the Mutual Broadcasting System on April 27, 1946, becoming its 300th station, with the network broadcasting a two-hour prime-time special, Mutual's 300 Party, honoring the event).

From the time of its sign-on until the sale to its current owner, the station maintained its studios and offices at its transmitter site at 746 Orange Street on a hilltop overlooking downtown Oil City.

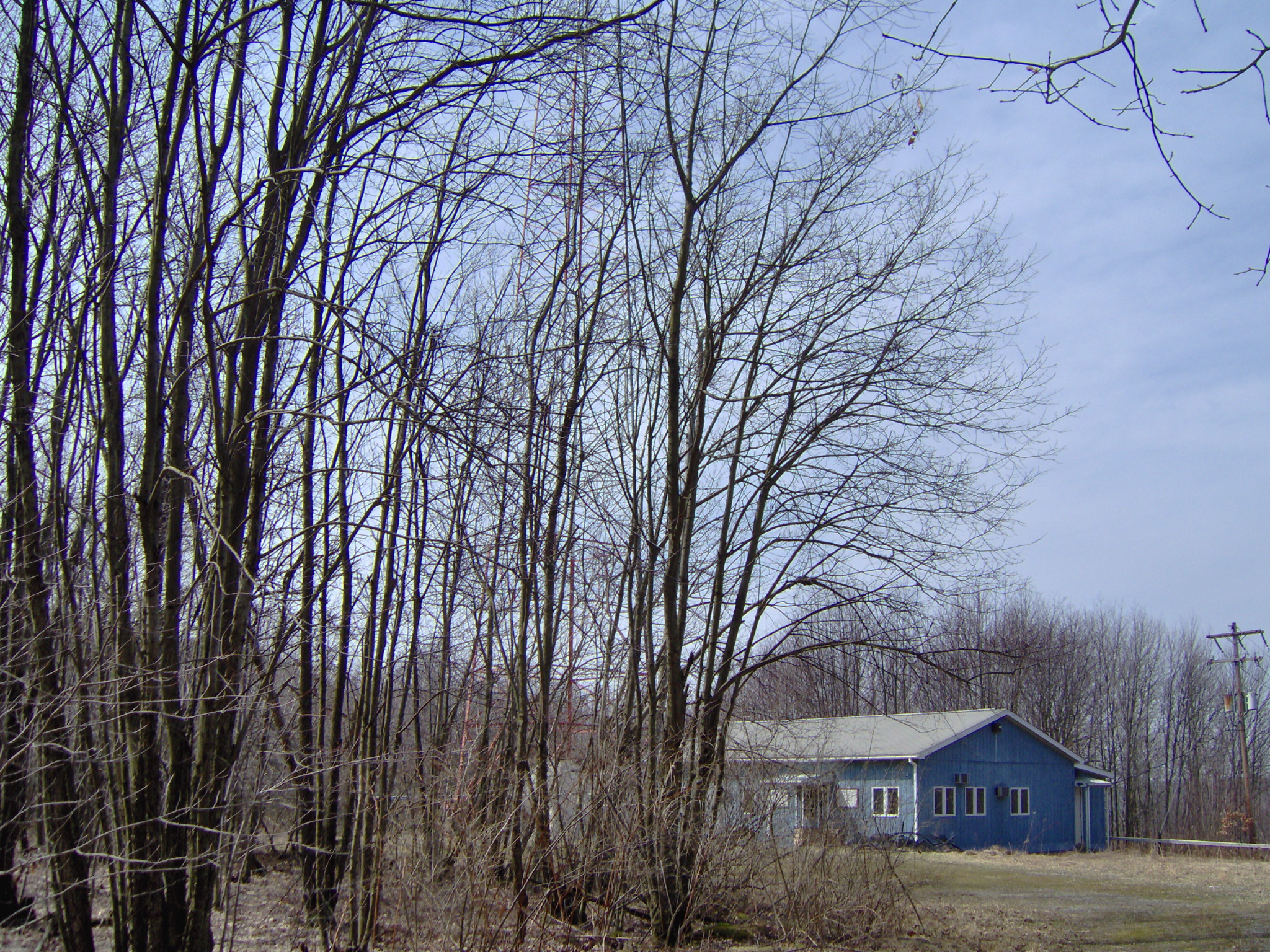
WOYL's longtime home at 746 Orange Street, Oil City. Studio and transmitter building, now used for transmitter only.

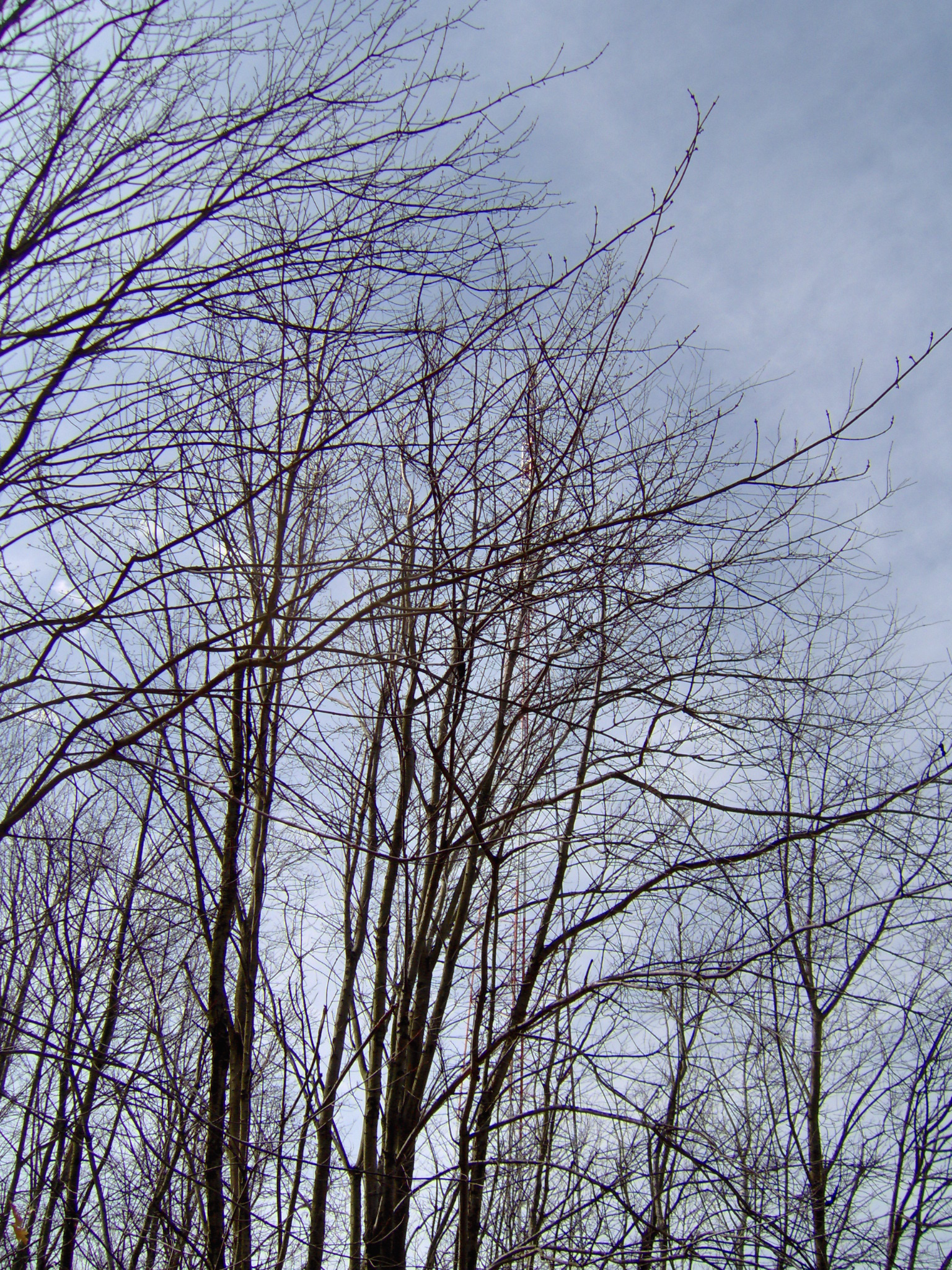
WOYL broadcast tower, shared with WGYI-FM (formerly WRKS 98.5), at 746 Orange Street, Oil City.

=== FM signs on ===
WOYL also became the first FM licensee in Venango County when it signed on its sister FM station on May 1, 1957. In later years, WOYL-FM developed into a 20,000-watt powerhouse.

It remains the only such powerful station in all of Venango County, though now under different call letters and ownership.

=== Sale to Robert J. Shupala ===
On Feb. 1, 1977, ownership of the stations changed principally to orthodontist Robert J. Shupala, who changed the AM call letters to WOYL and the FM call letters to WRJS, named for Shupala's initials. The stations had been simulcasting, but under the new ownership and management they began separate programming.

WOYL's music became Top-40 based (although retaining the news and information), while WRJS briefly became Easy Listening, then settled into Beautiful Music (station was semi-automated with only occasional interruptions by an announcer). Upon Shupala's death in 1980, his wife Jean assumed control of the stations.

==== Personnel ====
- Robert J. Shupala, president
- Anthony J. Sciere, VP & general manager
- Judy Jackman, coml. manager
- Ronald Antill, program director
- Donald Collins, production manager
- John A. Sciere, operations & music director
- David R. Hurst, news director
- Bernard Staudt, chief engineer

=== Sale to Fidelity Communications ===
Both stations were sold in 1982 to Fidelity Communications, which continued to operate both stations until a brief period of duopoly ownership by its competitor in 1998 before the sale to Forever Broadcasting in 2000.

Under Fidelity's ownership, WOYL remained the same, but the FM station adopted a country music format with a live and local airstaff, unlike other stations in a market this size that chose to automate their programming.

When Oil Valley Broadcasting, headed by Thomas Sauber (whose father owned competitors WFRA AM/FM in Franklin and WTIV Titusville), purchased the stations, WRJS' call letters changed to WOYL-FM and took on the moniker "98.5 The (oil) Well", but maintained its country music format; however, WOYL turned into a part-time simulcast of this newly named station.

=== Sale to Forever Broadcasting ===
Thomas Sauber, who had managed WOYL's competitors in Franklin, the county seat, agreed to sell both stations to Forever Broadcasting, of Altoona, Pennsylvania in the summer of 2000. Sauber's father, Robert Sauber, had founded WFRA and WTIV, both AM stations in Franklin and Titusville, respectively, and WFRA-FM in Franklin. Tom Sauber also owned an FM station of his own in Cambridge Springs, which also was sold to Forever Broadcasting in a separate transaction.

Following its acquisition by Forever Broadcasting, WOYL was established as an affiliate of Forever's newly formed Allegheny News Talk Sports Network, which programs a mixture of local and syndicated talk, along with the Pittsburgh pro sports franchises of the Steelers, Pirates and Penguins. The network was set up as a "quadcast," a simultaneous rebroadcast of the same programming over four radio stations, that included WOYL. The others are:

- WFRA Franklin
- WMGW Meadville (flagship station)
- WTIV Titusville

The four radio stations, however, do break down their morning programming into a two-station simulcast, with WFRA and WOYL airing program matter exclusive to Venango County, while WTIV and WMGW air programming more exclusive to Crawford County. WFRA and WOYL air their live morning show from studios at 1411 Liberty Street in Franklin, the longtime home of WFRA. A satellite sales office also operates from this location. The quadcast among the four stations then resumes.

WOYL's longtime general manager under Fidelity ownership, Sam Gordon (who had been with the station since the WKRZ days), left the station after its sale to join competing station WKQW/WKQW-FM, where he works as an advertising sales representative.

=== Demise ===
WOYL remained silent since December 27, 2009, according to the FCC's website. WOYL was removed from the Allegheny News Talk Sports Network's Facebook page, though its logo remained on the network's master website. It requested special temporary authority to remain silent through June 2010, but instead of requesting an extension of this authority following its expiration, Forever opted to return the license to the FCC, which canceled it on August 18, 2010. The other three stations in the Allegheny News Talk Network remained in operation.
