= WUZZ =

WUZZ may refer to:

- WUZZ (AM), a radio station (1280 AM) licensed to serve New Castle, Pennsylvania, United States
- WRQI, a radio station (94.3 FM) licensed to serve Saegertown, Pennsylvania, which held the call sign WUZZ from 2007 to 2018
- WEGE, a radio station (104.9 FM) licensed to serve Lima, Ohio, United States, which held the call sign WUZZ or WUZZ-FM from 1998 from 2007
