= WQEW =

WQEW may refer to:

- WQEW-LP, a low-power radio station (98.5 FM) licensed to serve Philadelphia, Pennsylvania, United States
- WFME (AM), a radio station (1560 AM) licensed to serve New York, New York, United States, which held the call sign WQEW from 1992 to 2015
