= WKST =

WKST is the callsign of two radio stations:

- WKST (AM), a radio station (1200 AM) licensed to New Castle, Pennsylvania, United States
- WKST-FM, a radio station (96.1 FM) licensed to Pittsburgh, Pennsylvania, United States
- WKST, former callsign of WYTV, Youngstown, Ohio television channel 33
