= WFRA =

Radio station in Franklin, Pennsylvania

Coordinates: 41°23′30″N 79°48′41″W

Simulcasts WMGW Meadville
- Franklin, Pennsylvania; United States
- Frequency: 1450 kHz
- Branding: Pop! Radio 98.1/100.7

Programming
- Format: Top 40/CHR
- Affiliations: Compass Media Networks

Ownership
- Owner: Seven Mountains Media; (Southern Belle Media Family, LLC)
- Sister stations: WGYI, WGYY, WHMJ, WUZZ, WKST, WMGW, WRQI, WRQW, WTIV, WXMJ, WYLE

History
- First air date: April 13, 1958
- Call sign meaning: Franklin (city of license)

Technical information
- Licensing authority: FCC
- Facility ID: 49777
- Class: C
- Power: 990 watts unlimited
- Translator: 98.1 W251CL (Franklin)

Links
- Public license information: Public file; LMS
- Webcast: Listen live
- Website: ilovepopradio.com

WFRA (1450 AM) is a radio station in Franklin, Pennsylvania, United States. It is owned by Seven Mountains Media, through licensee Southern Belle Media Family, LLC. WFRA broadcasts at a full-time power of 990 watts.

== History ==
WFRA went on the air in 1958, three years after the debut of its affiliate station, WTIV in Titusville, roughly fifteen miles north of Franklin just north of the Crawford-Venango County border. Though the stations were situated within close proximity of each other, owner and founder Robert H. Sauber was allowed to put another AM station on the air because the two stations were in separate counties, thus meeting more stringent FCC ownership limits at the time.

Like WTIV, WFRA boasted a full-service format of news, talk, sports, and middle of the road music, which was typical (and still is, though to a lesser degree today) of small-town AM radio stations. Though co-owned, both stations (the latter doing business as Northwestern Pennsylvania Broadcasting Company, Inc.) were still managed and operated very separately, with Sauber's son Thomas running the station in its later years.

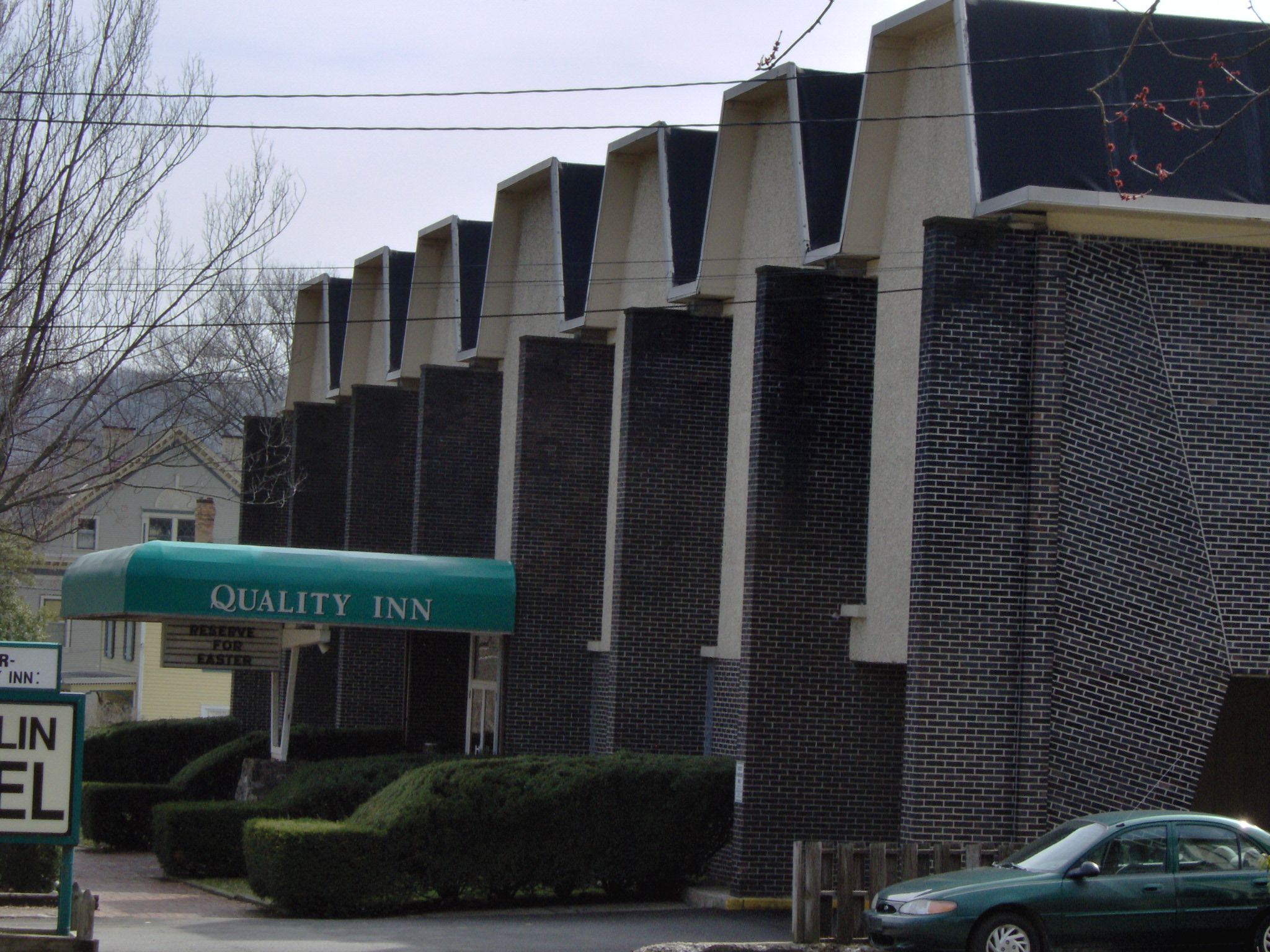
WFRA-AM-FM's former home, at 1411 Liberty Street in Franklin. The radio stations maintained an office in this hotel for many years until its recent move to Allegheny Boulevard, where it remains today.

In March 1971, Sauber put an FM station on the air, WVEN, which simulcast some programming of its AM affiliate in its early years. The station later became known as WFRA-FM; however, as more and more cars became equipped with FM radios, WFRA-FM finally broke away from WFRA completely, forming its own identity.

In July 2000, Sauber wanted to retire and put his stations up for sale. All three were purchased by Altoona-based Forever Broadcasting, LLC for an undisclosed sum. Sauber died in October 2004 at the age of 72.

Until 2023, most of WFRA's broadcast day was a simulcast of two radio stations (including itself) in Venango and Crawford Counties. The other was WMGW (until December 2009, WOYL in Oil City had also been a part of this network, in effect making it a quadcast; WOYL permanently ceased operations in July 2010). During weekday mornings, WFRA aired a live and local morning show, while WTIV and WMGW aired their own live local morning show with local content exclusive to the immediate area. After the morning show, the two-station simulcast began.

Effective January 1, 2023, Forever Media sold WFRA as part of a package of 34 stations and 12 translators to Seven Mountains Media for $17.375 million.

On October 19, 2023, WFRA and WMGW changed their formats from news/talk/sports to Top 40/CHR, branded as "Pop 98.1/100.7".
