= WMGW =

Radio station in Meadville, Pennsylvania

- Meadville, Pennsylvania; United States
- Broadcast area: Crawford County
- Frequency: 1490 kHz
- Branding: Pop! Radio 98.1–100.7

Programming
- Format: Contemporary hit radio
- Affiliations: Compass Media Networks

Ownership
- Owner: Seven Mountains Media; (Southern Belle Media Family, LLC)
- Sister stations: WFRA, WGYI, WGYY, WHMJ, WUZZ, WKST, WRQI, WRQW, WTIV, WXMJ, WYLE

History
- First air date: 1947
- Call sign meaning: Mary Grace Winslow (founder's daughter)

Technical information
- Licensing authority: FCC
- Facility ID: 24942
- Class: C
- Power: 1,000 watts unlimited
- Transmitter coordinates: 41°37′53″N 80°10′37″W
- Translator: 100.7 W264DK (Meadville)
- Repeater: 1450 WFRA (Franklin)

Links
- Public license information: Public file; LMS
- Webcast: Listen live
- Website: ilovepopradio.com

WMGW (1490 AM) is a commercial radio station in Meadville, Pennsylvania, United States and is owned by Seven Mountains Media.

Programming is simulcast on one other Seven Mountains Media station, WFRA in Franklin. WMGW is also heard on 250-watt FM translator W264DK at 100.7 MHz.

== History ==
=== Early years ===
WMGW signed on the air in 1947, as the first radio station in Crawford County. It was founded by Meadville physician Dr. Harry C. Winslow. Dr. Winslow chose his daughter's initials (Mary Grace Winslow) for the station's call letters. A year after WMGW's founding, an FM station was added at 100.3, WMGW-FM. For the first three decades, WMGW and WMGW-FM mostly simulcast their programming.

Like many small-town radio stations, WMGW-AM-FM broadcast a full service radio format through the 1960s, 1970s and 1980s, consisting of local, world and national news, local and Pittsburgh sports, and adult contemporary music. World and national news was provided by ABC News and the Associated Press radio network.

In the early 1970s, WMGW-AM-FM were purchased by the Regional Broadcasters Group headquartered in Kingston, New York. The FM station's call sign was changed to WZPR as a tribute to Meadville's Talon Corporation which, nearly a century earlier, had become America's first manufacturer of "hookless fasteners" or zippers. While WMGW's format remained the same, WZPR changed to automated beautiful music, and in 1978 it switched to its current format, country music, eventually taking the WGYY call sign.

=== Changes in ownership ===
WMGW was purchased by Great Circle Broadcasting in 1983, a division of the now-defunct Music Broadcasting Group. Approximately five years prior to the purchase, the studios and offices of both stations had moved from their second floor location on Park Avenue to the Downtown Mall on Water Street in Meadville, allowing shoppers to see a glimpse of the stations at work. The station remains in this location today.

In 1999, Music Broadcasting began negotiations to sell WMGW and its FM sister station WZPR, to Altoona, Pennsylvania-based Forever Broadcasting, which had been looking to gain a foothold in Northwest Pennsylvania. Forever Broadcasting acquired both stations the following year for an undisclosed price.

=== Switch to talk and sports ===
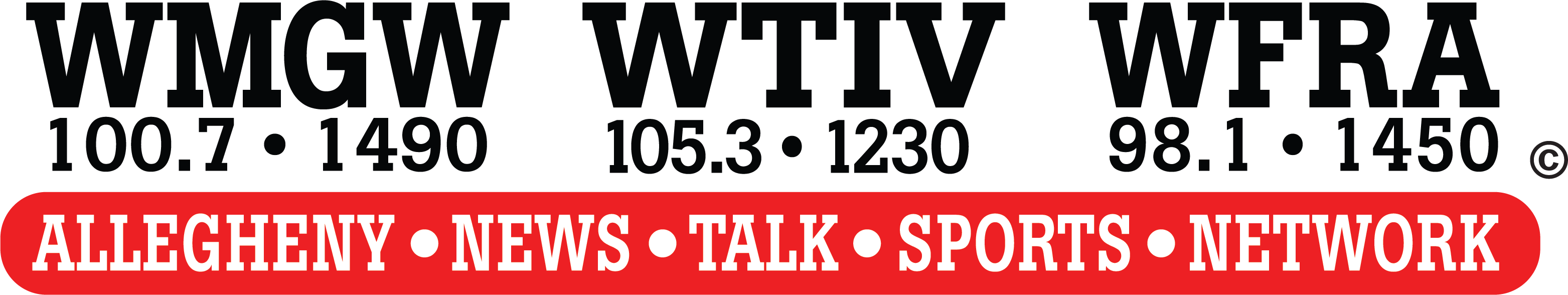
Final logo for the Allegheny News Talk Sports Network

By the 1990s, most listeners were tuning to FM stations for music. WMGW gradually eliminated its music programming. In 199, WMGW switched to a format of all news, talk, and sports. It formed the Allegheny News Talk Sports Network, along with two other AM stations owned by Forever Broadcasting. The network consisted of a "trimulcast" outside of morning drive, with all stations sharing the same lineup of nationally syndicated talk shows after 9 am, including Glenn Beck, Clay Travis and Buck Sexton, Sean Hannity, Mark Levin, Dave Ramsey, Jim Bohannon, Coast to Coast AM with George Noory and America in the Morning. Sports broadcasts included Pittsburgh Pirates baseball, and the NFL on Westwood One. (Prior to December 2009, WOYL in Oil City had also been a part of this network, in effect making it a quadcast. WOYL permanently ceased operations in July 2010.)

In morning drive, the trimulcast is broken down into a simulcast, with WMGW and WTIV airing a morning show independent of WFRA, which aired its own separate live morning show program with programming matter exclusive to its immediate local market. The full-time operations of the network and its respective stations originated out of the Downtown Mall location, but WFRA maintained a separate office and studio in WFRA's city of license in Franklin, Pennsylvania. Keith Allen Austin (real name: Keith Amolsch) hosted the morning show for WMGW and WTIV until his death on June 8, 2014, following a brief illness. He was 59.

Effective January 1, 2023, Forever Media sold WMGW as part of a package of 34 stations and 12 translators to Seven Mountains Media for $17.375 million.

=== Pop 98.1–100.7 ===
On October 19, 2023, WMGW changed their format from news/talk/sports to Top 40/CHR, branded as "Pop! 98.1–100.7".
