= WTIV =

Radio station in Titusville, Pennsylvania

Coordinates: 41°37′00″N 79°41′32″W

Simulcasting WHMJ Franklin
- Titusville, Pennsylvania; United States
- Frequency: 1230 kHz
- Branding: WUZZ Radio

Programming
- Format: Classic hits
- Affiliations: Penn State Nittany Lions

Ownership
- Owner: Seven Mountains Media; (Southern Belle Media Family, LLC)
- Sister stations: WFRA, WGYI, WGYY, WHMJ, WUZZ, WKST, WMGW, WRQI, WRQW, WXMJ, WYLE

History
- First air date: 1955
- Call sign meaning: Titusville

Technical information
- Licensing authority: FCC
- Facility ID: 74089
- Class: C
- Power: 1,000 watts
- Translator: 105.3 W287DC (Titusville)

Links
- Public license information: Public file; LMS
- Webcast: Listen live
- Website: wuzzradio.com

WTIV (1230 AM) is a radio station in Titusville, Pennsylvania, United States. WTIV operates at a full-time power of 1,000 watts. Though licensed to Titusville, programming, sales and administrative functions originate out of Meadville, Pennsylvania.

== History ==
WTIV was the first of three radio stations originally put on the air by Robert H. Sauber. Making its debut on November 27, 1955, WTIV offered a full-service format composed mainly of news, adult contemporary music and national and world news from the Mutual Broadcasting System, with little changes in program offerings over the years under his ownership.

Though Sauber would later put two other stations in Franklin on the air, he continued to manage WTIV as an entirely separate entity, serving as the station's general manager and sales manager. WTIV operated under the corporate name WTIV, Inc. (though Sauber himself was listed as licensee) while the Franklin stations did business as Northwestern Pennsylvania Broadcasting Company, Inc. Sauber also performed engineering duties for WTIV and the two Franklin stations.

WTIV's most notable employee was Tim Nelson. Tim joined WTIV in 1955 after graduating from high school in his native Warren, PA. He served as announcer and later program director for a total of 29 years. He left in 1984 to become President of the Titusville Chamber of Commerce.

In July 2000, Sauber wanted to retire and put his stations up for sale. All three were purchased by Altoona-based Forever Broadcasting, LLC for an undisclosed sum. Sauber died in October 2004 at the age of 76.

Following the sale of WTIV to Forever Broadcasting, operations were moved from the station's historic WTIV Building at 150 West Central Avenue in downtown Titusville, to the Downtown Mall in Meadville, Pennsylvania.

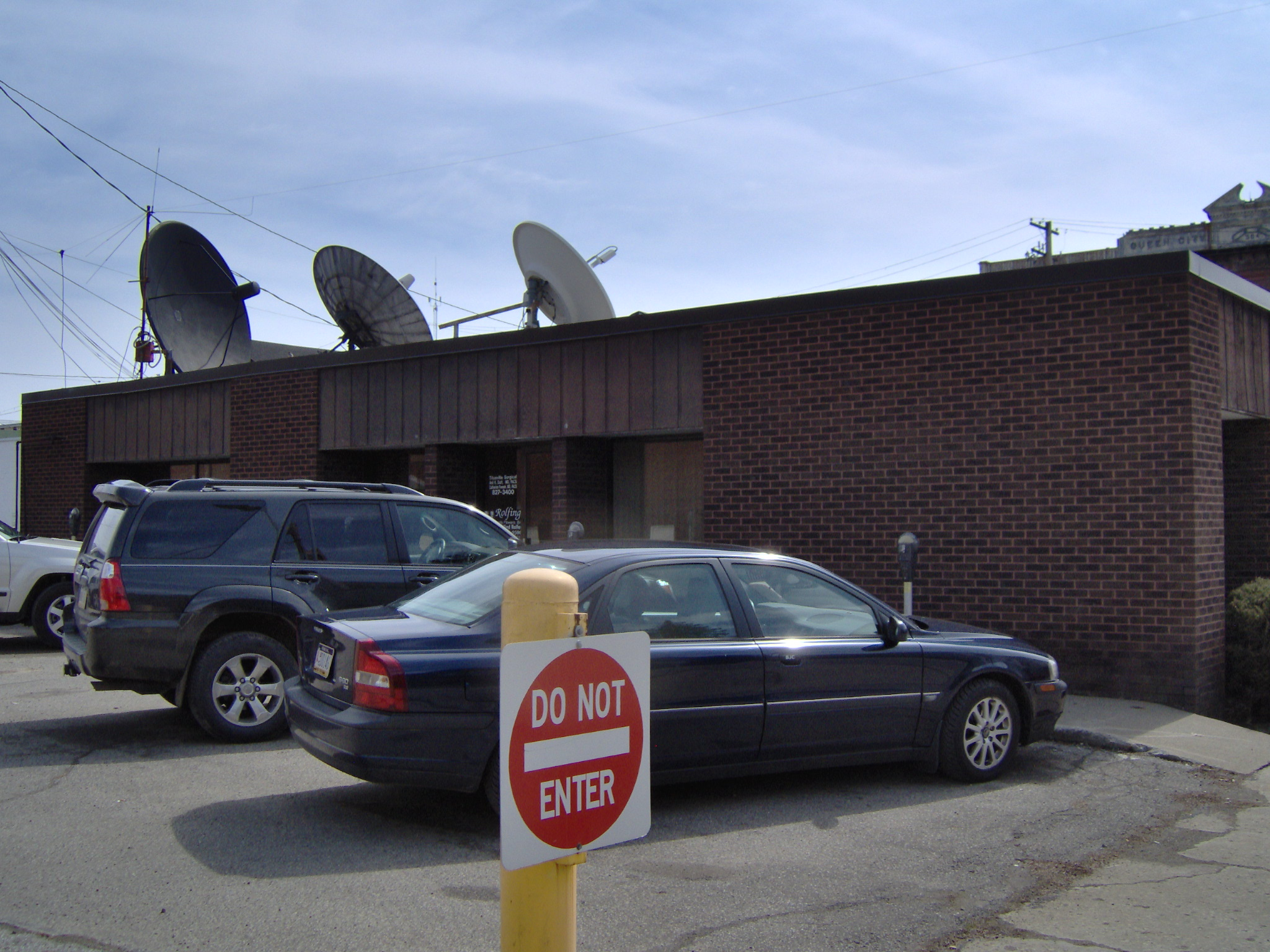
Unused satellite dishes remain at the former WTIV Building at 150 West Central Avenue in Titusville, Pennsylvania, now occupied by professional offices

Until 2023, WTIV was one of three radio stations operating as The Allegheny News Talk Sports Network. The stations operated most of the time as a "trimulcast", or programming simultaneously rebroadcast over three radio stations (until December 2009, WOYL in Oil City had also been a part of this network, in effect making it a quadcast; WOYL permanently ceased operations in July 2010). However, WTIV and its Meadville AM affiliate, WMGW, broke away from WFRA for a live local morning show containing program matter exclusive to Crawford County. After the morning show ended, the trimulcast resumed.

The morning show, along with all programming, administration, and sales functions, originated out of the Meadville office. The morning show was hosted by Keith Allen (Amolsch) Austin, program director for the network until his death in 2014.

It was announced on October 12, 2022, that Forever Media was selling 34 stations, including WTIV and the entire Meadville/Franklin cluster, to State College-based Seven Mountains Media for $17.375 million, pending FCC approval. The sale was consummated on January 1, 2023.

On October 16, 2023, WTIV changed its format from news/talk/sports to a simulcast of classic hits-formatted WHMJ (99.3 FM), branded as "WUZZ Radio".
