= WQZS =

Radio station in Meyersdale, Pennsylvania

Meyersdale, Pennsylvania; United States
- Broadcast area: Somerset County (limited)
- Frequency: 93.3 MHz
- Branding: QZ-93

Programming
- Language: English
- Format: Defunct (was Oldies/Classic rock)

Ownership
- Owner: Roger Wahl; (Roger Wahl)

History
- First air date: October 26, 1992; 33 years ago
- Last air date: April 4, 2024; 22 months ago

Technical information
- Licensing authority: FCC
- Facility ID: 57424
- Class: A
- ERP: 630 watts
- HAAT: 294 meters (965 ft)
- Transmitter coordinates: 39°47′49″N 79°10′4″W

Links
- Public license information: Public file; LMS

WQZS (93.3 FM) – branded QZ-93 – was a commercial oldies and classic rock radio station licensed to serve Meyersdale, Pennsylvania. Locally owned by Roger Wahl, the station served Somerset County, along with nearby Cumberland, Frostburg, and Oakland, Maryland, and was the regional affiliate for CBS News Radio. The founder of WQZS, Wahl also acted as both the station's operations manager and morning host, billed on-air as "The Commander".

The station only operated via an analog transmission, with a Facebook page being its lone online presence.

== History ==
=== Beginnings ===
The station was founded by Roger Wahl, a Somerset County native who worked in the Altoona radio market during the early and mid-1970s. He gave up working in radio to care for an ailing family member in the late 1970s, and returned to the Meyersdale area as a result. He was working as a regional sales manager for a Maryland beer distributor when he began planning WQZS. One of Wahl's customers on his account list owned a radio station, and the two men struck up a friendship which frequently included radio shop talk. One day, the conversation led to Wahl's client informing him of a window of new FM applications, including a drop-in frequency at 93.3 MHz in Meyersdale.

Wahl applied for a construction permit on August 8, 1988, but it was not until July 1990 that the FCC granted the application, turning away another applicant for the frequency. From a transmitter on Mount Davis, the state's highest point, WQZS began broadcasting on October 26, 1992, with an oldies format. The station operated with a staff of nine: three sales consultants, a receptionist, a news director, three announcers, and Wahl, taking the title of Station Director. WQZS changed little after going on the air, having the same owner, format, and studio location at 128 Hunsrick Road in Summit Township, about 5 miles (8.0 km) south of Meyersdale and in the foothills of the Meyersdale Wind Energy Center.

=== Legal Issues ===
Wahl was arrested in September 2019 amid accusations that he created a false dating profile for a 61 year-old woman known to him and wrote the profile to solicit men to sexually assault that subject, and of also placing a trail camera in the woman's bathroom without her knowledge or consent. The victim also obtained a protection from abuse order against Wahl. Wahl waived his right to a preliminary hearing in November 2019 and negotiated a guilty plea in Somerset County Court in June 2020.

In March 2020, Wahl filed an application to transfer control of WQZS to his daughter, Wendy Sipple, for $10. The FCC approved the transfer on June 1, 2020; after the guilty plea, it reversed its decision in a July 13 order, returning the application to pending status. Wahl was sentenced November 17, 2020, on felony charges of criminal use of a communications facility, misdemeanor charges of reckless endangerment, unlawful dissemination of an intimate image, tampering with evidence, and identity theft. He was sentenced to three years of restricted probation, with four months of electronic monitoring rather than incarceration due to the COVID-19 pandemic, and forbidden from broadcasting during his sentence.

On October 19, 2021, the FCC issued a hearing designation order beginning a proceeding to revoke WQZS's license as a result of his multiple misdemeanors; it also held the application to transfer WQZS to Sipple in abeyance. On August 2, 2022, the Administrative Law Judge overseeing the case terminated hearing proceedings deciding that Roger Wahl had failed to participate as required and effectively waived his right to a hearing. The license for WQZS expired on August 1, 2022, with its renewal application pending. A 180-page "Petition to Deny" the renewal was filed by another Meyersdale radio station, WHYU-FM, which would be rendered moot once the revocation and denial of transfer became final.

On April 12, 2023, the FCC's enforcement chief ordered WQZS’s license revocation. On April 14, 2023 an application for review was filed by Roger Wahl and his new attorney. WHYU-FM filed an opposition to that appeal.

On April 4, 2024, Wahl's AFR was formally denied, upholding the initial revocation order. WQZS was ordered to cease broadcasting immediately or risk forfeiture. The station ceased broadcasting later that same day.
