= Seven Mountains Media =

American radio broadcasting and digital marketing company

- Type: Private
- Industry: Mass media
- Genre: Radio broadcasting; Digital marketing
- Founded: 2014; 12 years ago
- Founder: Kristin Cantrell
- Headquarters: State College, Pennsylvania, United States
- Website: 7mountainsmedia.com

Seven Mountains Media LLC, also doing business as Southern Belle LLC, is an American radio broadcasting and digital marketing company founded in 2014 by Kristin Cantrell and based in State College, Pennsylvania. It owns radio stations in New York, Pennsylvania, Ohio and Kentucky, the last of which operates under the brand CapCity Communications.

== History ==
Cantrell's father, Kerby Confer, was also a prominent radio broadcaster; Confer had founded the Forever radio station groups (Forever Broadcasting, Forever Communications and Forever Media).

In October 2011, it was announced that Forever Broadcasting would sell its three Kentucky stations to Southern Belle LLC for $700,000. In November 2011, Aloha Station Trust LLC sold WKRD-FM for $175,000.

On September 8, 2014, it was announced that Seven Mountains (a new company at the time) struck a deal with First Media Radio LLC to acquire four of its State College radio stations for $2.075 million. One week later on September 15, Seven Mountains struck another deal to acquired three more radio stations from 2510 Licenses for $2.05 million.

In November 2014, Seven Mountains acquired two Lewistown, Pennsylvania stations from Starview Media Inc. for $650,000.

Following the complete acquisition of the Lewistown stations, in April 2015, Seven Mountains acquired WHUN-FM in Mount Union, Pennsylvania and WHUN in Huntingdon, Pennsylvania from Forever Media for $100,000.

On August 12, 2015, Max Media sold its four Central Pennsylvania radio stations to Seven Mountains for $3.8 million.

In October 2016, First Media Radio sell the rest of its west Central Pennsylvania radio cluster to Seven Mountains for $4.5 million.

In January 2019, it was announced that Community Broadcasters would sell their seven stations in Corning–Elmira and Olean, New York to Seven Mountains for $3.9 million.

On August 14, 2019, Seven Mountains announced that they would acquire two Stroudsburg, Pennsylvania stations from Connoisseur Media for $1.1 million.

In December 2019, Davenport Broadcasting agreed to sell WKYL to CapCity for $250,000.

In January 2020, Seven Mountains announced that they would acquire three full-power stations and twelve FM translators from companies controlled by George Hawras and Kevin Fitzgerald for $2 million. In October, they also acquired WUDE-FM for $200,000.

In February 2021, Seven Mountains announced that they would acquire 11 stations and five translators across the Southern Tier of New York State from Waypoint Media's subsidiary Sound Communications for $1.8 million. They would also trade four of their existing stations, and three stations and one translator from Sound to Family Life Ministries for WCIG and five translators in New York.

On October 12, 2022, it was announced that Seven Mountains would acquire 34 stations and 12 translators from Forever Media for $17.375 million. Almost a month later on November 7, Seven Mountains announced that they acquired WCCR-FM and WWCH from Clarion County Broadcasting Corp. for an undisclosed amount.

In September 2023, Seven Mountains acquired four Bowling Green, Kentucky stations from Forever Communications for $1.125 million. The same day, they also acquired six Parkersburg, West Virginia stations from Burbach Broadcasting for $700,000.

In April 2024, Seven Mountains announced that would acquire two station from Jim Lotus' Covenant Communications for $75,000. This came 5 months after Lotus left his Seven Mountains' role as the chief operating officer (COO).

In May 2024, Seven Mountains sold WLGD to Times-Shamrock Communications for $300,000.

In July 2024, it was announced that Seven Mountains Media would acquire WLIH from Good Christian Radio Broadcasting for $125,000.

One month later in August, Seven Mountains announced that they had closed a deal to buy three more Bowling Green, Kentucky stations (WCLU, WLYE-FM, WLLI) from Royse Radio for $450,000. Two months later in October 2024, Seven Mountains announced that the company and Commonwealth Broadcasting agreed to swap stations. The station Seven Mountains swapped from Commonwealth are WKLX (under a local marketing agreement), WOVO, WPTQ and WWKU.

In August 2025, Seven Mountains sold WQBG to Family Life Ministries for $400,000.

== Radio stations ==
AM Station	FM Station

Market	State	Station	Format
Bowling Green	Kentucky	WBVR 1340 (Note: Utilizes an FM translator, W233CZ, on 94.5 MHz in Bowling Green, Kentucky.)	Country
Bowling Green	Kentucky	WWKU 1450 (Note: Utilizes an FM translator, W274CD, on 102.7 MHz in Plum Springs, Kentucky.)	Active rock
Bowling Green	Kentucky	W240CP 95.9	Classic hip hop
Bowling Green	Kentucky	WOVO 96.7	Country
Bowling Green	Kentucky	WKLX 100.7 (Note: Owned by Commonwealth Broadcasting, but operated by Seven Mountains Media under LMA.)	Classic hits
Bowling Green	Kentucky	WPTQ 105.3	Classic rock
Bowling Green	Kentucky	WBVR-FM 106.3	Country
Bowling Green	Kentucky	WUHU 107.1	Hot adult contemporary
Elmira–Corning	New York	WMAJ 1230 (Note: Utilizes 2 FM translators, W294BU, on 106.7 MHz in Corning, New York and W295BY on 106.9 MHz in Elmira, New York.)	Adult contemporary
Elmira–Corning	New York	WENI 1450 (Note: Utilizes 2 FM translators, W275DD, on 102.9 MHz in Elmira, New York and W277DG, on 103.3 MHz in Corning, New York.)	Classic country
Elmira–Corning	New York	WNDA 1490 (Note: Utilizes an FM translator, W226CG, on 93.1 MHz in Wellsboro, Pennsylvania.)	Classic hits
Elmira–Corning	New York	WNGZ 1490 (Note: Utilizes 2 FM translators, W226BA, on 93.1 MHz in Elmira, New York and W228DN, on 93.5 MHz in Corning, New York.)	Classic hits
Elmira–Corning	New York	WOGA 92.3	Classic hits
Elmira–Corning	New York	WNBT-FM 104.5	Country
Elmira–Corning	New York	WENI-FM 92.7	Classic rock
Elmira–Corning	New York	WMTT-FM 94.7	Classic rock
Elmira–Corning	New York	WCBF 96.1	Country
Elmira–Corning	New York	WPHD 98.7	Classic hits
Elmira–Corning	New York	WNBT-FM 104.5	Country
Elmira–Corning	New York	WNKI 106.1	Contemporary hit radio
Hornell	New York	WZHD 97.1	Classic rock
Hornell	New York	WKPQ 105.3	Country
Olean	New York	WOEN 1360 (Note: Utilizes an FM translator, W242CT, on 96.3 MHz in Olean, New York.)	Classic rock
Olean	New York	WOLY 1450 (Note: Utilizes 2 FM translators, W288EK, on 105.5 MHz and W296DB on 107.1 MHz in Olean, New York.)	Classic hits
Olean	New York	WPIG 95.7	Country
Olean	New York	WQRS 98.3	Classic rock
Olean	New York	WMXO 101.5	Contemporary hit radio
Youngstown	Ohio	WUZZ 1200 (Note: Utilizes an FM translator, W250CW, on 97.9 MHz in New Castle, Pennsylvania.)	Classic hits
Youngstown	Ohio	WKST 1280 (Note: Utilizes an FM translator, W248DJ, on 97.5 MHz in New Castle, Pennsylvania.)	Classic country
Youngstown	Ohio	WYLE 95.1	Classic country
Altoona	Pennsylvania	WFBG 1290 (Note: Utilizes an FM translator, W283DI, on 104.5 MHz in Altoona, Pennsylvania.)	Contemporary hit radio
Altoona	Pennsylvania	WTNA 1430 (Note: Utilizes an FM translator, W259DG, on 99.7 MHz in Altoona, Pennsylvania.)	Classic hits
Altoona	Pennsylvania	WFGY 98.1	Country
Altoona	Pennsylvania	WALY 100.1	Adult contemporary
Altoona	Pennsylvania	WQWY 103.9	Classic hits
Altoona	Pennsylvania	WRKY-FM 104.9	Classic rock
Altoona	Pennsylvania	WDBF-FM 106.3	Country
Bloomsburg	Pennsylvania	WHLM 930 (Note: Utilizes 3 FM translators, W282CO, on 104.3 MHz in Bloomsburg, Pennsylvania, W288CF, on 105.5 MHz in Danville, Pennsylvania, and W296CD, on 107.1 in Jonestown, Pennsylvania.)	Classic rock
Bloomsburg	Pennsylvania	WBWX 1280 (Note: Utilizes an FM translator, W242CY, on 96.3 MHz in Berwick, Pennsylvania.)	Classic rock
Bloomsburg	Pennsylvania	WCFT-FM 106.5	Country
Clarion	Pennsylvania	WWCH 1300 (Note: Utilizes an FM translator, W231DR, on 94.1 MHz in Clarion, Pennsylvania.)	Classic country
Clarion	Pennsylvania	WCCR-FM 92.7	Contemporary hit radio
Clarion	Pennsylvania	WKFT 101.3	Classic country
Clearfield–DuBois	Pennsylvania	WCPA 900 (Note: Utilizes 2 FM translators, W253CU, on 98.5 MHz in Clearfield, Pennsylvania and W269EC, on 101.7 MHz in DuBois, Pennsylvania.)	Classic hits
Clearfield–DuBois	Pennsylvania	WPQP 93.1	Contemporary hit radio
Clearfield–DuBois	Pennsylvania	WQQP 95.9	Contemporary hit radio
Clearfield–DuBois	Pennsylvania	WMKX 105.5	Modern/classic rock
Franklin–Meadville	Pennsylvania	WTIV 1230 (Note: Utilizes an FM translator, W287DC, on 105.3 MHz in Titusville, Pennsylvania.)	Classic hits
Franklin–Meadville	Pennsylvania	WFRA 1450 (Note: Utilizes an FM translator, W251CL, on 98.1 MHz in Franklin, Pennsylvania.)	Contemporary hit radio
Franklin–Meadville	Pennsylvania	WMGW 1490 (Note: Utilizes an FM translator, W264DK, on 100.7 MHz in Meadville, Pennsylvania.)	Contemporary hit radio
Franklin–Meadville	Pennsylvania	WRQI 94.3	Classic rock
Franklin–Meadville	Pennsylvania	WHMJ 99.3	Classic hits
Franklin–Meadville	Pennsylvania	WGYY 100.3	Country
Indiana-Johnstown	Pennsylvania	WGGI 990 (Note: Utilizes an FM translator, W278CR, on 103.5 MHz in Somerset, Pennsylvania.)	Country
Indiana-Johnstown	Pennsylvania	WNTJ 1490 (Note: Utilizes an FM translator, W283CX, on 104.5 MHz in Johnstown, Pennsylvania.)	Classic hits
Indiana-Johnstown	Pennsylvania	WJHT 92.1	Contemporary hit radio
Indiana-Johnstown	Pennsylvania	WFGI-FM 95.5	Country
Indiana-Johnstown	Pennsylvania	WKYE 96.5	Adult contemporary
Indiana-Johnstown	Pennsylvania	WRKW 99.1	Classic rock
Indiana-Johnstown	Pennsylvania	WOWQ 101.7	Classic hits
Lebanon	Pennsylvania	WLBR 1270 (Note: Utilizes an FM translator, W259DM, on 99.7 MHz in Lebanon, Pennsylvania.)	Full-service radio–classic hits
Lebanon	Pennsylvania	WFVY 100.1	Country
Lewistown	Pennsylvania	WLUI 670 (Note: Utilizes an FM translator, W225CK, on 92.9 MHz in Lewistown, Pennsylvania.)	Oldies
Lewistown	Pennsylvania	WHUN 1150 (Note: Utilizes an FM translator, W249DD, on 97.7 MHz in Huntingdon, Pennsylvania.)	Classic hits
Lewistown	Pennsylvania	WJUN 1220 (Note: Utilizes an FM translator, W298CR, on 107.5 MHZ in Mexico, Pennsylvania)	Classic rock
Lewistown	Pennsylvania	WIBF 92.5	Country
Lewistown	Pennsylvania	WMRF-FM 95.7	Hot adult contemporary
Lewistown	Pennsylvania	WNNA 106.1	Classic hits
Mansfield–Wellsboro	Pennsylvania	WLIH 107.1	—N/a
Scranton–Wilkes-Barre–Hazleton	Pennsylvania	WARM 590 (Note: Utilizes an FM translator, W269CF, on 101.7 MHz in Scranton, Pennsylvania.)	Classic hits
Selinsgrove–Lewisburg	Pennsylvania	WHNA 92.3	Classic hits
Selinsgrove–Lewisburg	Pennsylvania	WRBG 98.3	Country
State College	Pennsylvania	WLGJ 1260 (Note: Utilizes an FM translator, W282CV, on 104.3 MHz in State College, Pennsylvania.)	Classic country
State College	Pennsylvania	WBHV 1390 (Note: Utilizes an FM translator, W227DV, on 93.3 MHz in State College, Pennsylvania.)	Contemporary hit radio
State College	Pennsylvania	WLEJ 1450 (Note: Utilizes an FM translator, W279DK, on 103.7 in State College, Pennsylvania.)	Classic country
State College	Pennsylvania	WZWW 93.7	Hot adult contemporary
State College	Pennsylvania	WBUS 99.5	Classic rock
State College	Pennsylvania	WFGE 101.1	Country
State College	Pennsylvania	WOWY 103.1	Classic hits
Stroudsburg	Pennsylvania	WPCO 840 (Note: Utilizes an FM translator, W276DG, on 103.1 MHz in Stroudsburg, Pennsylvania.)	Classic hits
Stroudsburg	Pennsylvania	WSBG 93.5	Hot adult contemporary
Stroudsburg	Pennsylvania	WVPO 96.7	Country
Williamsport	Pennsylvania	WLYC 1050 (Note: Utilizes 3 FM translators, W224AI, on 92.7 MHz in Loyalsock, Pennsylvania, W272ED, on 102.3 MHz in Lewisburg, Pennsylvania and W298DJ, on 107.5 MHz in Muncy, Pennsylvania.)	Classic rock
Williamsport	Pennsylvania	WEJS 1600 (Note: Utilizes an FM translator, W281CO, on 104.1 MHz in Jersey Shore, Pennsylvania.)	Classic country
Parkersburg	West Virginia	WLYQ 1050 (Note: Utilizes an FM translator, W234DC, on 94.7 MHz in Parkersburg, West Virginia.)	Classic country
Parkersburg	West Virginia	WPKB 1230 (Note: Utilizes an FM translator, W278CQ, on 103.5 MHz in Parkersburg, West Virginia.)	Contemporary hit radio
Parkersburg	West Virginia	WGGE 95.1	Country
Parkersburg	West Virginia	WXIL 99.1	Classic hits
Parkersburg	West Virginia	WHBR-FM 103.1	Active rock
Parkersburg	West Virginia	WRZZ 106.1	Classic rock

CapCity Communications
- Type: Private
- Genre: Radio broadcasting
- Founded: 2011
- Founder: Kristin Cantrell
- Headquarters: Frankfort, Kentucky, United States
- Website: capcityradio.com

=== CapCity stations ===
Market	State	Station	Format
Frankfort–Lexington	Kentucky	WKYW 1490 (Note: Utilizes an FM translator, W228CL, on 93.5 FM in Frankfort, Kentucky.)	Classic rock
Frankfort–Lexington	Kentucky	WVKY 101.7	Country
Frankfort–Lexington	Kentucky	WKYL 102.1	Classic hits
Frankfort–Lexington	Kentucky	WFRT-FM 103.7	Classic hits
