= WSAJ (AM) =

Grove City, Pennsylvania; United States
- Frequency: 1340 kHz

Programming
- Language: English

Ownership
- Owner: Grove City College
- Sister stations: WSAJ-FM

History
- First air date: November 29, 1922
- Last air date: c. January 30, 2006
- Former frequencies: 360 meters (1922–1924); 1180 kHz (1924–1925); 1310 kHz (1925–1927); 1340 kHz (1927); 1310 kHz (1927–1941)
- Call sign meaning: Sequentially issued

Technical information
- Facility ID: 25462
- Class: C
- Power: 100 watts (limited, time-share with WOYL)
- Transmitter coordinates: 41°9′20.2″N 80°4′46.2″W

WSAJ was one of the earliest AM educational radio stations, licensed from November 29, 1922, to January 30, 2006, to Grove City College in Grove City, Pennsylvania, United States. The station traced its founding to broadcasts made over "Technical and Training School" station 8YV, which began in March 1920.

WSAJ broadcast from Rockwell Science Hall on the college campus. The station was one of the last to use a horizontal longwire antenna, which in WSAJ's case was strung between two wooden poles, instead of more modern vertical tower radiators.

== History ==
=== Beginnings ===
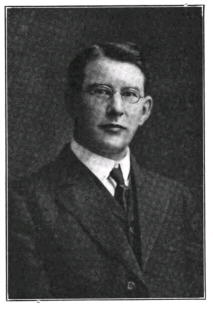
WSAJ's founder, Dr. Herbert W. Harmon

Radio research at Grove City College, primarily under the oversight of physics professor Herbert W. Harmon, dated to at least 1914, when Harmon and the school were jointly issued a license for a standard amateur station with the callsign 8CO. In early 1917 the college received a Technical and Training School license, with the callsign 8YV. Like most radio stations at this time, the college's stations used spark transmitters, so they could only be used for Morse code communication. In addition, on April 6, 1917 all civilian radio stations were ordered to shut down, due to the start of World War One.

Effective October 1, 1919, the ban on civilian radio stations was lifted, and 8YV was reactivated. During the war advances in vacuum-tube technology had made audio transmissions practical, but in the immediate post-war period tubes were scarce and difficult to find. However, Dr. Harmon had worked for the Bureau of Standards in Washington, D.C. during the war, and was able to borrow VT-2 transmitter tubes from the Army Signal Corps. He used these to construct a transmitter that was awarded first place in the "$100 Radiophone Prize Contest" run by Radio Amateur News, and the equipment was reviewed in depth in a 3-page article in that magazine's May 1920 issue.

In addition to using his station for individual communication with amateur radio operators, in late March 1920 Harmon began making nightly concert broadcasts. A particularly celebrated broadcast followed on April 26, when the president of the college, Dr. Weir C. Ketler, addressed a noonday Rotary Club luncheon which was being held 25 miles (40 km) away in New Castle. Rex Patch, a club member and radio amateur (8HA), handled the receiving equipment for this event. This broadcast was traditionally considered as WSAJ's founding, although it actually took place 2½ years before the station received its first broadcasting license with the WSAJ callsign.

=== WSAJ ===
On November 29, 1922, the college was issued a license for a new AM broadcasting station, operating on the wavelength of 360 meters (833 kilohertz), with the sequentially assigned call letters of WSAJ. The station changed its transmitting frequency a number of times over the years, before being assigned, as part of the General Order 40 reallocation that took effect November 11, 1928, on a "local" frequency, 1310 kilohertz, with a power of 100 watts, the maximum allowed at that time on local frequencies.

In early 1932 WSAJ was assigned a "Specified Hours" schedule, broadcasting just two nights per week, on Tuesdays and Thursdays, starting at 7:15 pm. Later that fall, the station's studio and transmitter moved from the older lower campus to the new upper campus, and as part of a new radio laboratory in the Rockwell Science Hall, a "T-type" longwire antenna with counterpoise was strung between two poles on the building's roof. In 1941, as part of the reshuffling necessitated by the North American Regional Broadcasting Agreement (NARBA), all stations on 1310 kilohertz moved to 1340 kilohertz, which remained WSAJ's assignment the remainder of its time on the air. Although the power limit for "Class IV" (later renamed "Class C") local stations would eventually be raised to 1,000 watts, WSAJ would be one of a very few broadcasters to remain at 100 watts.

In 1946, WOYL in Oil City, Pennsylvania began operating, using same frequency as WSAJ and separated by only 65 kilometers (40 miles). In order for the two stations to co-exist, the Federal Communications Commission (FCC) mandated that WOYL sign off for approximately 90 minutes twice a week in order to protect WSAJ's limited on-air schedule. In later years, the FCC determined that this "shared-time" restriction was no longer necessary because the stations did not create significant co-channel interference.

To commemorate the 50th anniversary of his April 1920 Rotary broadcast, on April 27, 1970 Dr. Ketler again addressed the New Castle Rotary Club's Monday meeting by radio, although he admitted that he was unable to fully re-enact the original speech, because he had not saved a copy of its text.

=== WSAJ-FM ===
An FM station at 89.5 MHz was added under the same call sign in 1968 before moving to 91.1 MHz during the 1990s. Student programming was a mainstay on WSAJ-FM from its inception, with off-site satellite-delivered programming used during non-student programs, until a power increase in 1995 resulted in the FM station's coverage area being significantly enlarged. At that time, student broadcasting ceased on the FM station and was moved to a low-powered current carrier AM station transmitting on 530 kHz, which could only be heard in the immediate vicinity of the college campus. Because of its low power the carrier current station did not require a license from the Federal Communications Commission or qualify for officially issued call letters. However, it informally adopted "WGCC" to identify itself. This operation later added an intranet streaming format.

=== WSAJ (AM) signs off ===
Over the next few years, the AM broadcasting equipment deteriorated until it was no longer functional. Because of WSAJ's limited signal and its short (three-hour-per-week) FCC authorized broadcast schedule, it was determined that the cost to replace the equipment was too great for the benefit provided to the college and the listening community.

In 2004, newly installed college president Richard G. Jewell and chairman of the board David Rathburn, himself a WSAJ alumnus, instituted policy changes which allowed student broadcasting to return to the more powerful FM station. At that time the student programming rebranded itself as 91.1 The One and adopted a primarily indie rock format. In early 2006 the operating license for WSAJ was allowed to expire, while WSAJ-FM remained on the air. The original poles and longwire antenna for WSAJ, though no longer functional, remained atop Rockwell Science Hall for a year before being removed.
