= WDNR =

Radio station of Widener University in Chester, Pennsylvania

Coordinates: 39.8618°N 75.3552°W

Chester, Pennsylvania; United States
- Broadcast area: Philadelphia/Chester, Pennsylvania
- Frequency: 89.5 MHz
- Branding: "Widener's Best"

Programming
- Format: College radio

Ownership
- Owner: Widener University

History
- First air date: 1968
- Last air date: 2014
- Call sign meaning: WiDeNeR

Technical information
- Facility ID: 72383
- Class: D
- ERP: 8 watts
- HAAT: 26 meters (85 ft)

Links
- Website: wdnrfm.org

WDNR (89.5 FM, "Widener's Best") was a college radio station in Chester, Pennsylvania, licensed to Widener University. The station used to broadcast a wide variety of music and could also be listened to on the Internet via an online stream. WDNR marked its 40th anniversary in 2008.

On August 29, 2014, the FCC cancelled WDNR's license, after the university decided to no longer operate the station.
