= WBEM (AM) =

- Windber, Pennsylvania; United States
- Broadcast area: Johnstown, Pennsylvania
- Frequency: 1350 kHz

Ownership
- Owner: JOTOCOM Communications, Inc.

History
- First air date: May 18, 1964
- Last air date: 1991
- Former call signs: WWBR (1964–1985)

Technical information
- Facility ID: 32310
- Class: D
- Power: 2,500 watts (days only)

WBEM (1350 AM) was a radio station in Windber, Pennsylvania, United States that operated from 1964 to 1991. The station was built by Windber Community Broadcasting System as WWBR in 1964. It was last owned by JOTOCOM Communications, Inc., which bought it in 1989 before taking it off the air in 1991.

== History ==
Originally known as WWBR, the station signed on May 18, 1964, from studios and offices at 1311 Midway Avenue in Windber and under the ownership of Windber Community Broadcasting System. Dr. E.Z. Epperjessy served as company president.

=== First sale ===
In January 1975, the station was sold by Windber Community Broadcasting System to WWBR, Inc. Louis Popp, an original partner in the station, served as company president and general manager.

Station operations were moved to 1724 Scalp Avenue, in Richland Township, overlooking the city of Johnstown, in 1979. The following year, the station increased its power from 1,000 to 2,500 watts non-directional, but still retained its daytime-only status.

=== Second and third sales ===
One of this station's owners was legendary Pittsburgh radio and television newscaster Hank Baughman, anchor at WPXI in Pittsburgh, who bought the station in April 1985. Baughman stepped down from the station two months later. Doing business as Baughman Media, Inc., the station was airing mostly MOR music from 10-inch tape reels from Drake-Chenault's music library. Not long after his arrival, Baughman changed the call letters to WBEM and affiliated the station with the ABC Talkradio network, airing a mixture of both local and national talk.

Finding that building an audience would take too long and after an unsuccessful attempt to acquire an FM station, Baughman sold WBEM to Greater Johnstown Radio, Inc. in August 1986. Greater Johnstown Radio, Inc. was headed by David Rod Wolf, who owned Altoona-based WRTA. Because Johnstown and Altoona were separate radio markets despite both cities being in a combined television market, the transaction still met FCC ownership limits.

=== Final sale and demise ===
WBEM was unable to prosper, and on April 1, 1989, the station was sold again, this time to JOTOCOM Communications. JOTOCOM was owned by John Thomas Conners, the former general manager of Altoona television station WTAJ-TV; Conners had previously attempted to use the company to buy WWPC (channel 23) in Altoona. WBEM had fallen on hard times over the years, largely due to the collapse of Johnstown's lucrative local coal and steel-based economy, which had a domino effect on retail business in the area. Because the landscape was already dominated with high and medium-powered FM stations now too in a period of hardship, WBEM found itself in a weak position to compete as a strict daytime-only station.

WBEM was silent by 1991. round the time its license was set to expire, which was August 1. Its studio building was then cleared out of all of its equipment, with all traces of a radio station's existence removed, including its broadcast tower. The station did not formally forfeit its license, and it was ultimately cancelled under terms outlined in the Telecommunications Act of 1996.

=== Aftermath ===
In January 2004, the FCC received an application for a new station to broadcast on 1350 kHz from Southwest Pennsylvania Community Radio, LLC; owned by Michael Horvath, of North Huntingdon, Pennsylvania. Horvath had owned two previous radio stations in the Pittsburgh radio market, known then as WXVX (now WPGR) Monroeville and WPLW (later WZUM) Carnegie, which he had acquired in the mid-1990s before selling both in the early years of the 21st century. Prior to selling both, Horvath had invested substantially in new directional antenna arrays, making them more palatable to prospective buyers.

Unlike its predecessor, the succeeding station would have been licensed to Geistown, Pennsylvania, located just east of the Johnstown city limits. Another application was received in July 2007 to modify the application, which also included antenna diagrams for building the new six-tower directional antenna system and its proposed operational pattern. On September 2, 2010, the construction permit to build the new station on this frequency was formally cancelled.
