= WYLE (FM) =

Radio station in Grove City, Pennsylvania

Coordinates: 41.252°N 80.358°W

- Grove City, Pennsylvania; United States
- Broadcast area: Youngstown metropolitan area
- Frequency: 95.1 MHz
- Branding: Willie 95.1 & 97.5

Programming
- Format: Classic country
- Affiliations: Pittsburgh Steelers Radio Network

Ownership
- Owner: Seven Mountains Media; (Southern Belle Media Family, LLC)
- Sister stations: WGYI; WGYY; WHMJ; WKST; WUZZ; WXMJ; WRQI; WRQW; WFRA; WMGW; WTIV

History
- First air date: September 10, 1962 (as WEDA-FM)
- Former call signs: WEDA-FM (1962–1988); WRKU-FM (1988–1994); WICT (1994–1996); WICT-FM (1996–1997); WICT (1997–2004); WWGY (2004–2017)
- Call sign meaning: "Willie"

Technical information
- Licensing authority: FCC
- Facility ID: 74469
- Class: B
- ERP: 19,000 watts
- HAAT: 245 meters (804 ft)
- Repeater: 1280 WKST (New Castle)

Links
- Public license information: Public file; LMS
- Webcast: Listen live
- Website: mywillieradio.com

WYLE (95.1 MHz), branded as Willie 95.1 & 97.5, is a classic country formatted FM radio station in Grove City, Pennsylvania, United States. It is owned by Seven Mountains Media, through licensee Southern Belle Media Family, LLC. The station originates its programming from facilities it shares with WKST and WUZZ in New Castle, Pennsylvania.

WYLE is a station on the Pittsburgh Steelers Radio Network.

== History ==
=== Beginnings as WEDA-FM ===
WYLE first signed on the air on September 10, 1962, as WEDA-FM, under the ownership of WEDA Inc. Founder James V. Perry also served as president and general manager, and was also a two-term mayor for Grove City beginning in 1970. Studios were located at 125 S. Broad Street in Grove City. The station first broadcast at this frequency with a power output of 3,000 watts.

For much of its early history, the station broadcast a format of easy listening and adult contemporary music until the early 1980s, when it adopted an urban contemporary format. However, it reverted to adult contemporary music by 1986 when the station went through its first ownership change in December of that year. Western Pennsylvania Radio was a division of Beta Broadcasting, a corporation headed by Bruce Simel.

=== As WRKU-FM ===
By the end of the 1980s, WEDA-FM underwent a substantial change. It changed its format from adult contemporary to album-oriented rock and adopted the call sign WRKU-FM, and the resulting position statement "K-Rock: We Will Rock You". The station was also granted a substantial transmitter power increase from 3,000 to 50,000 watts ERP, allowing it to relocate its studios and offices to the Churchill Square shopping center at 4531 Belmont Avenue in Youngstown, Ohio. Because there was no album rock station on the air in the Youngstown radio market at the time, WRKU-FM became the de facto rock station in that city, while still retaining its community of license as Grove City.

=== As WICT ===
In November 1994, WRKU-FM was sold for $1.4 million to Zapis Communications, which also acquired WHTX, a competing station licensed to Sharpsville, Pennsylvania, and its sister, WRQQ in Farrell, Pennsylvania. The transaction occurred after Federal Communications Commission ownership rules were relaxed allowing owners the opportunity to acquire more than one FM and one AM in a single market.

The WRKU-FM format and call sign were spun off to WHTX, so that 95.1 could adopt a country music format and the call sign WICT-FM, following the lead of stations in other markets switching to country after a surge in that format's popularity. WRQQ was rechristened WICT, making it a full-time simulcast of its new FM sister. The WICT stations then became known as "Cat Country". John Thomas the only remaining staff member of the WRKU demise was named Program Director. WICT-FM, along with the newly rechristened WICT and WRKU-FM, then moved its studios and offices to 4800 Belmont Avenue in Youngstown.

The station would make one final studio move during its time in Ohio, and that would be near Ohio State Route 82 to 6874 Strimbu Drive SE in Brookfield, Ohio, after the station was acquired by GOCOM Communications in February 1998.

=== As WWGY ===
In February 2004, WICT was acquired by Altoona, Pennsylvania-based Forever Media Inc., for $2.28 million. Upon purchasing the station, Forever Media Inc. moved the station's studios and offices back to Pennsylvania, co-located them with new dual AM sister stations WBZY and WKST at 219 Savannah-Gardner Road in New Castle. WICT's call sign was then changed to WWGY, and like the majority of country stations under the Forever umbrella, took the "Froggy" brand as "Froggy 95".

On September 30, 2017, the station changed to a classic country format known as "Willie 95.1" and changed its call sign to WYLE.

It was announced on October 12, 2022, that Forever Media was selling 34 stations, including WYLE, to State College-based Seven Mountains Media for $17.375 million. The deal closed on January 1, 2023.

WYLE is also simulcast on WKST (1280 AM) with FM translator, W248DJ at 97.5 in New Castle.
