= WSAJ-FM =

Coordinates: 41.247°N 79.900°W

Grove City, Pennsylvania; United States
- Frequency: 91.1 MHz
- Branding: 91.1 The One

Programming
- Format: Freeform

Ownership
- Owner: Grove City College

History
- First air date: 1968
- Call sign meaning: Carried from WSAJ

Technical information
- Licensing authority: FCC
- Facility ID: 25463
- Class: A
- ERP: 2,700 watts
- HAAT: 153 meters (502 ft)

Links
- Public license information: Public file; LMS
- Website: wsaj.com

WSAJ-FM (91.1 MHz) is a non-commercial college radio station located in Grove City, Pennsylvania. The station is owned and operated by Grove City College and carries syndicated classical and jazz music, as well as student programming and local sports coverage. The station is managed by an employee of the college, and its day-to-day operations are overseen by a staff of student volunteers when school is in session.

== History ==
=== Beginnings ===
Physics Professor Dr. Herbert W. Harmon conducted radio experimentation at Grove City College beginning in 1914, first over amateur radio station 8CO, and later Technical and Training School station 8YV. All civilian radio stations were shut down during World War One, however 8YV was restarted after the war. In late March 1920, Dr. Harmon began broadcasting a series of entertainment broadcasts. On April 26, 1920, college president Weir C. Ketler transmitted a speech from the college to the New Castle Rotary Club, and this has traditionally been recognized as the anniversary date for the beginning of organized broadcasting by Grove City College. However, the College did not officially hold a broadcasting license until November 29, 1922, when it was granted one for a new AM station, which was given the sequentially assigned callsign WSAJ.

=== WSAJ-FM ===
The original WSAJ AM station was low-powered and was only permitted to broadcast a few hours per week. Thus, in 1968 an FM sister, WSAJ-FM, was established, initially on 89.5 MHz, and later moving to 91.1 MHz during the 1990s. Student programming was a mainstay on WSAJ from its inception, with off-site satellite-delivered programming during non-student programs, until a power increase in 1995 resulted in the FM station's coverage area being significantly enlarged. At that time, student broadcasting on the FM station ceased and was moved to a current-carrier AM station on 530 kHz, which could only be heard in the immediate vicinity of the college campus.

Student programming subsequently moved to a carrier-current station and later to an intranet streaming format, calling itself WGCC, even though this was not a legitimately-issued call sign. In 2004, newly installed college president Richard G. Jewell and chairman of the board David Rathburn, himself a WSAJ alumnus, instituted policy changes which allowed student broadcasting to return to the more powerful FM station. At that time the student programming rebranded itself as 91.1 The One and adopted a primarily indie rock format. With the AM station limited to just three hours of operation per week, and merely rebroadcasting the FM station's programming during that time, the College allowed the original WSAJ's license to expire in early 2006.

=== Addition of HD radio and signal increase ===
In 2007 WSAJ-FM applied for a construction permit to increase its signal across more of western Pennsylvania through a move to a new tower and a power increase from 1,600 to 2,700 watts. WSAJ-FM moved to its new tower in the southwest corner of Venango County and filed its license to cover in March 2011. The new transmitter broadcasts in HD Radio, and its analog signal area has greatly improved to the north and east especially, including areas such as Franklin, Pennsylvania, Oil City, Pennsylvania and portions of Clarion County.

== Programming ==
In March 2007 WSAJ-FM made significant changes to its syndicated programming lineup. For years, the station had carried classical music programming during the daytime from the Beethoven Satellite Network, originating at WFMT in Chicago. It was decided to switch to classical music offerings from Public Radio International, which also enabled the station to add news programming from the British Broadcasting Corporation. The station also added a variety of specialty classical, jazz, bluegrass, and folk music shows throughout the week. The WFMT syndicated program "Jazz with Bob Parlocha" continues to air as well.

During the school year, students from a recognized campus organization fill each evening of the week with programming under the moniker "91-1 The One", featuring a main format of independent/alternative rock. Under this format, the station reports its spin counts to the College Media Journal. Some students also air specialty shows during the week. The organization appoints its executive staff that governs the student programming. The students also do regular remote broadcasts at the college's Homecoming and Parents' Weekend events.

WSAJ-FM also airs Grove City College football and road basketball games and some area high school football games.

WSAJ-FM has future plans to add more local programming and news coverage to benefit the citizens of Grove City and the surrounding areas. Already, WSAJ-FM has aired brief reports from Grove City Borough Council meetings.
