= WRQI =

Radio station in Saegertown, Pennsylvania

WRQI and WRQW
WRQI: Saegertown, Pennsylvania; WRQW: Cooperstown, Pennsylvania; United States
- Broadcast area: Meadville–Franklin, Pennsylvania and Erie, Pennsylvania
- Frequencies: WRQI: 94.3 MHz; WRQW: 107.7 MHz
- Branding: Rocky 94.3 & 107.7

Programming
- Format: Classic rock
- Affiliations: United Stations Radio Networks; Pittsburgh Steelers Radio Network

Ownership
- Owner: Seven Mountains Media; (Southern Belle Media Family, LLC)
- Sister stations: WFRA, WGYI, WGYY, WHMJ, WUZZ, WKST, WMGW, WXMJ, WYLE, WTIV

History
- First air date: WRQI: January 19, 1979; WRQW: September 7, 2000
- Former call signs: WRQI: WYSS (1979–1983); WEOZ (1983–1995); WMDE (1995–2000); WHUZ (2000–2007); WUZZ (2007–2018); WRQW: WMHU (2000–2001); WHUG (2001–2002); WUUZ (2002–2018)
- Call sign meaning: "Rocky"

Technical information
- Licensing authority: FCC
- Facility ID: WRQI: 12918; WRQW: 88380
- Class: WRQI: A; WRQW: A
- ERP: WRQI: 2,150 watts; WRQW: 4,500 watts
- HAAT: WRQI: 168 meters (551 ft); WRQW: 115 meters (377 ft)
- Transmitter coordinates: WRQI: 41.631°N 80.177°W

Links
- Public license information: WRQI: Public file; LMS; WRQW: Public file; LMS
- Webcast: Listen live
- Website: myrockyradio.com

WRQI (94.3 FM) is a classic rock music-formatted radio station in Saegertown, Pennsylvania, United States, and owned by Seven Mountains Media, through licensee Southern Belle Media Family, LLC, and is branded as "Rocky 94.3 & 107.7". WRQI simulcasts with WRQW 107.7 FM (licensed to Cooperstown), serving Titusville, Oil City, Franklin, and Tionesta. Until May 2007, this station was known as WHUZ.

== History ==
=== Beginnings as WYSS ===
WRQI, the first of these two stations, first went on the air January 19, 1979 as WYSS. Though licensed to Saegertown, the station operated from Meadville (where it remains today), the seat of government from Crawford County, Pennsylvania, for most of its existence. The station signed on with a Top 40 format under the ownership of Saegertown Broadcasting Inc., a company headed by Arthur Arkelian, and maintained studios on Broad Street in Saegertown.

The call sign was changed from WYSS to WEOZ in 1983. With the call sign came a change in ownership, as the station was sold to Osborne Broadcasting, a company headed by Thomas Osborne, that year. The station also moved shortly afterwards from Saegertown to Meadville. WEOZ was then sold to Community First Broadcasting, a company headed by Werner Poegel, in August 1988 for $436,943.00. The format was then changed to a blend of adult contemporary and oldies programmed mostly from compact disc which was novel at the time. Community First Broadcasting maintained ownership of WEOZ until financial circumstances forced the station to go dark in August 1991. The station was dark for several years.

The station returned under a new call sign, a new owner, and a new format. Rechristened as WMDE, the station programmed a modern rock format under its previous owner, the now defunct Great Circle Broadcasting. Ultimately the station was sold to Forever Broadcasting with the format being tweaked to "classic hits" as WUZZ 94.

=== 107.7 signs on ===
Forever Broadcasting was issued a construction permit for a new "drop-in" frequency of 107.7 in Cooperstown. The permit was granted on September 11, 1997. The station signed on as WMHU September 7, 2000 as a simulcast outlet of WMDE. In March of the following year, the call sign was changed to WHUG, and the station became a simulcast outlet of WXXO and WOXX in Cambridge Springs and Franklin, duplicating the "Kiss" monikered adult contemporary programming offered on those two channels.

=== WUZZ 94 & 107 ===
The station once boasted a large live and local staff of on air personalities, over the years it became largely automated. Live shows included the WUZZ Rockin' Morning Show, hosted by program director Rockin' Rich from 6am-10am, and a live afternoon show hosted by Reno. Weekends were typically automated, with the WUZZ music playing without any air personalities. Syndicated shows hosted by Dee Snider and Sammy Hagar aired on Saturday evenings, during a timeslot that once housed "Big Hair Saturday Night" - another elimination of local programming and live personalities on the station. Dave English, who is Tadpole on sister station Froggy, voicetracked the weekday midday show, which was previously hosted live.

=== Rocky 94.3 & 107.7 ===
On June 11, 2018, WUZZ and WUUZ rebranded as "Rocky 94.3 & 107.7". On June 12, WUZZ and WUUZ changed their call signs to WRQI and WRQW, respectively. The station features the Westwood One satellite Classic Rock X format with local personality "Rockin'" Rich Anton live in morning drive from 6am-10am and the syndicated Ultimate Classic Rock Sunday-Friday 7pm-12am.

It was announced on October 12, 2022 that Forever Media was selling 34 stations, including WRQI, WRQW, and the entire Meadville/Franklin cluster, to State College-based Seven Mountains Media for $17.375 million. The deal closed on January 1, 2023.

== Pittsburgh Steelers football ==
Rocky 94.3/107.7 is the radio home for Pittsburgh Steelers football during the NFL season.

== Previous logos ==
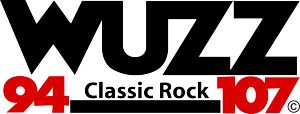
