= WLIH =

- Whitneyville, Pennsylvania; United States
- Broadcast area: Mansfield–Wellsboro, Pennsylvania
- Frequency: 107.1 MHz

Ownership
- Owner: Seven Mountains Media; (Southern Belle, LLC)

History
- First air date: March 15, 1987
- Call sign meaning: "Where Listening Invites Hope"

Technical information
- Licensing authority: FCC
- Facility ID: 24576
- Class: A
- ERP: 3,300 watts
- HAAT: 91 meters (299 ft)
- Transmitter coordinates: 41°46′13″N 77°12′08″W

Links
- Public license information: Public file; LMS

WLIH (107.1 MHz) is a radio station in Whitneyville, Charleston Township, Tioga County, Pennsylvania, United States. The station is owned by Seven Mountains Media.

WLIH signed on March 15, 1987. Its programming included Christian talk and teaching shows such as Focus on the Family, Joyce Meyer, Living on the Edge with Chip Ingram, Faith Family Radio with Pastor Ken Schoonover, Daily Hope with Rick Warren, and MoneyWise with Howard Dayton and Steve Moore. WLIH also aired a variety of contemporary Christian music.

The WLIH license expired unrenewed on August 1, 2022, leading to the Federal Communications Commission (FCC) canceling it on November 7. On November 16, the FCC reinstated WLIH's license and granted them special temporary authority to continue broadcasting, pending an application for reconsideration of the license cancellation and an application for renewal.

In July 2024, it was announced that Good Christian Radio Broadcasting would sell WLIH to Seven Mountains Media for $125,000; Seven Mountains also entered a time brokerage agreement. The sale was consummated on May 7, 2025.
