= WHMJ =

Radio station in Franklin, Pennsylvania

WHMJ and WXMJ
WHMJ: Franklin, Pennsylvania; WXMJ: Cambridge Springs, Pennsylvania; United States
- Broadcast area: Meadville–Franklin, Oil City
- Frequencies: WHMJ: 99.3 MHz; WXMJ: 104.5 MHz
- Branding: WUZZ Radio

Programming
- Format: Classic hits
- Affiliations: Penn State Nittany Lions

Ownership
- Owner: Seven Mountains Media; (Southern Belle Media Family, LLC)
- Sister stations: WFRA, WGYI, WGYY, WUZZ, WKST, WMGW, WRQI, WRQW, WTIV, WYLE

History
- First air date: WHMJ: 1971; WXMJ: 1996
- Former call signs: WHMJ: WVEN-FM (1971–1989); WFRA (1989–2000); WOXX (2000–2007); WXMJ: WAQM (1996–2000); WXXO (2000–2007)
- Call sign meaning: Former "Majic" branding

Technical information
- Licensing authority: FCC
- Facility ID: WHMJ: 49789; WXMJ: 76254
- Class: WHMJ: B1; WXMJ: A
- ERP: WHMJ: 7,300 watts; WXMJ: 2,550 watts
- HAAT: WHMJ: 183 meters (600 ft); WXMJ: 156 meters (512 ft)
- Transmitter coordinates: WHMJ: 41°26′16.2″N 79°55′28.2″W; WXMJ: 41°42′10.2″N 80°9′53.2″W

Links
- Public license information: WHMJ: Public file; LMS; WXMJ: Public file; LMS
- Webcast: Listen live
- Website: wuzzradio.com

WHMJ (99.3 FM) and WXMJ (104.5 FM) are classic hits music-formatted radio stations broadcasting in northwest Pennsylvania, United States. The station is owned by Seven Mountains Media, through licensee Southern Belle Media Family, LLC, and broadcasts from the Downtown Mall in Meadville.

== History ==
=== Beginnings as WVEN-FM ===
This station debuted on 99.3 as WVEN-FM on March 5, 1971, as a partial simulcast of AM parent WFRA, with occasional break-aways for its own original programming that closely mirrored WFRA, usually during periods of the broadcast day when WFRA offered talk and news-intensive programming. As more and more cars became equipped with FM radios, the two radio stations broke away from each other and became completely separate programming operations, though WVEN would recapture the call sign of its sister AM station in 1989.

For many years, WVEN was known as "Mix 99.3", boasting an Adult CHR format with full-service local elements.

WXMJ 104.5 made its debut on November 21, 1996 as WAQM. This station was sold in July 2000 by MacBeth Communications to Forever Broadcasting. Macbeth Communications was a company owned by Thom Sauber, the son of Robert H. Sauber, WFRA's founder.

Also in July 2000, Bob Sauber, whose son Tom managed WFRA-AM-FM in addition to his own WAQM, wanted to retire and put his stations up for sale. All three (Sauber also owned WTIV in Titusville, the first of the group) were purchased by Altoona-based Forever Broadcasting, LLC for an undisclosed sum. Sauber died in October 2004 at the age of 72.

=== The 2000s ===
After being acquired by Forever Broadcasting, the stations became "Today's Best Music: 99.3 and 104.5 The All-New Kiss FM" in November 2000. Kiss FM aired a Hot Adult Contemporary format from 5am-6pm, and a cross between CHR and Hot AC in the evening hours. In typical Forever Broadcasting fashion, it took many years for the "all new" imaging to be dropped. It finally was dropped in January 2006, only 21 months before the station would flip formats to the jockless "Majic."

The call letters used during the Kiss FM era were WOXX for the 99.3 signal and WXXO for the 104.5 signal.

== 99.3 and 104.5 KISS FM ==
Throughout its run as Kiss FM, the station was known mainly for the Kiss FM Sunday Night Dance Parties held in Conneaut Lake during the summer months. The station's staff included personalities like "Ted Bear" (who was legendary Northwest Pennsylvania broadcaster Todd Adkins in disguise),"Billy Valentine","Drew Love" and "Cupid."

Special programming features during the Kiss FM tenure included the Top 9 at 9, Goodnight Kisses, the Kiss Cafe, Kiss Cartunes, Kiss It Or Diss It, and more recently the 5:00 Traffic Jam, 4 Play at 4, The Jammin' Saturday Night Kiss Party, and the Back In The Day Buffet. Hourly "Kiss In The Community" updates provided listeners with community event information and a chance for community members to have their message heard on local radio. These features helped cement the station’s popularity and reputation as an invaluable local resource to the Meadville, Franklin, and Oil City communities. Features that are notably absent on Majic, the automated radio station that has since replaced Kiss.

Throughout its run as Kiss FM (and even dating back to the Mix 99.3 days) legendary countdown host Casey Kasem's shows were always carried on the station. Other syndication throughout Kiss FM's reign included Backtrax USA with Kid Kelly and Saturday Night 80's. Even with these syndicated shows airing on weekend mornings and evenings, the station still staffed upcoming radio talent to run the board. Now, all programming is done without a staff as the current "Majic" incarnation of the station.

== Majic 99.3 and 104.5 ==
At 5pm on October 10, 2007, the stations flipped to "Majic" 99.3 and 104.5". From 5pm on October 10 through 6am October 12, the station went jockless, airing Majic teaser sweepers but still playing the Kiss FM playlist. At 6am on Friday October 12, the station officially kicked off with a Variety Hits format. The last song heard as Kiss FM was "Makes Me Wonder" by Maroon 5. The first song of the new Majic format was "We're Not Gonna Take It" by Twisted Sister. The entire airstaff was let go or reassigned to other stations in the cluster. This move left Northwest Pennsylvania radio without an outlet for hit music for the first time since the 1970s.

In April 2012, Majic phased out the Variety Hits format, keeping the "Majic" moniker and jockless presentation, but re-adapting a similar Hot AC/Adult Top 40 format that was found during the station's days as Kiss FM.

The Majic slogan debuted as "We Play Anything" but quickly switched to "We Play It All" due to nearby 94.7 Bob FM in Erie having the copyright for the former. With the April 2012 format tweak, the current slogan is "All The Hits", making WXBB the de facto adult hits station for Cambridge Springs and WRRK the de facto adult hits station for Franklin albeit far away. In 2016 the slogan changed back to "Today's Best Music", coming full circle from dropping exactly the same slogan during the 2007 Kiss FM to Majic format flip. As of January 2023, the slogan remains "Today's Best Music"

When the station was a Hot AC format as "Kiss FM" it boasted a large staff of live and local on air personalities. Until 2006, the station had a live personality in studio 24/7, even during the syndicated shows "American Top 40 with Casey Kasem" and "Saturday Night 80s." Voicetracking was occasionally used, but a live in studio board-op was always present. Now as Majic, the station is Top 40 and is automated 24/7 and the studio is unmanned. The station airs the syndicated Dave and Jimmy morning show out of WNCI Columbus.

== Sale to Seven Mountains Media ==
It was announced on October 12, 2022 that Forever Media was selling 34 stations, including WHMJ, WXMJ, and the entire Meadville/Franklin cluster, to State College-based Seven Mountains Media for $17.375 million. The deal closed on January 1, 2023.

== WUZZ Radio ==
On October 16, 2023, WHMJ and WXMJ changed their formats from top 40/CHR to classic hits, branded as "WUZZ Radio".

WUZZ Radio (WHMJ 99.3 and WXMJ 104.5) is also heard over WUZZ 1200 AM New Castle with FM translator 97.9 W250CW (New Castle) and WTIV 1230 AM Tittusville with FM translator 105.3 W287DC (Titusville).
