= WHYU-FM =

Radio station in Meyersdale, Pennsylvania

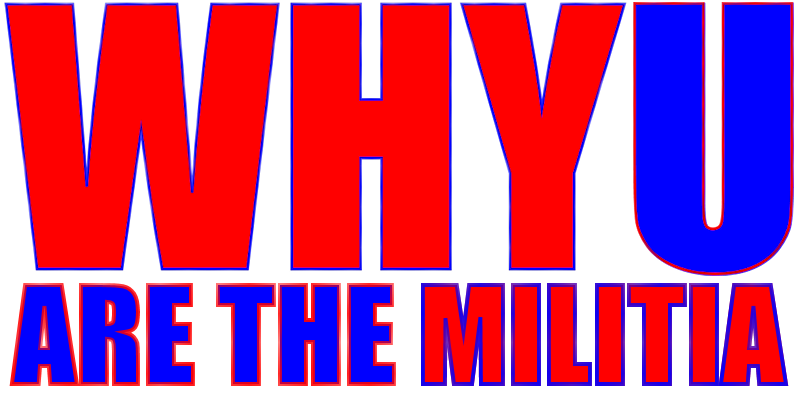
- Meyersdale, Pennsylvania; United States
- Broadcast area: Somerset County, Pennsylvania; Garrett County, Maryland
- Frequency: 89.1 MHz
- Branding: WHYU-FM

Programming
- Format: Full-service, American martial/patriotic music and conservative talk
- Affiliations: Voice of America

Ownership
- Owner: American Militia Association

History
- Founded: 2017 as LPFM
- First air date: August 16, 2022
- Former call signs: WHYU-LP (2017–2022; transitioned to full-power license)
- Former frequencies: 102.3 MHz (2017–2022)
- Call sign meaning: "Why are you the militia?"

Technical information
- Licensing authority: FCC
- Facility ID: 763299
- Class: A
- ERP: 1,300 watts
- HAAT: 24 meters (79 ft)
- Transmitter coordinates: 39°47′00″N 79°6′07″W

Links
- Public license information: Public file; LMS
- Webcast: Listen live
- Website: whyufm.com

WHYU-FM (89.1 FM) is a non-commercial radio station operated by the American Militia Association in Meyersdale, Pennsylvania. The station transferred from being a low-power FM station, to a full-power FM station in mid-August 2022.

The station claims to be the "only FCC licensed FM broadcast station operated by a militia-related organization in the United States".

On August 8, 2022, the American Militia Association surrendered the low-power station license for its former 102.3 FM frequency to the FCC, which cancelled it the same day as it transitioned to a full-power FM license on 89.1 MHz. The full-power version of the station then went on the air on August 16.
