= WLOQ =

- Oil City, Pennsylvania; United States
- Broadcast area: Meadville–Franklin area
- Frequency: 96.3 MHz

Programming
- Format: Contemporary Christian music
- Network: K-Love

Ownership
- Owner: Educational Media Foundation

History
- First air date: 1993; 33 years ago
- Former call signs: WKQW-FM (1993–2022)

Technical information
- Licensing authority: FCC
- Facility ID: 63289
- Class: A
- ERP: 6,000 watts
- HAAT: 100 meters (330 ft)
- Transmitter coordinates: 41°23′45.00″N 79°39′53.00″W

Links
- Public license information: Public file; LMS
- Webcast: Listen live
- Website: klove.com

WLOQ (96.3 FM) is a radio station that is located in Oil City, Pennsylvania, United States. It broadcasts the K-Love network and is owned by the Educational Media Foundation.

From 1993 to 2022, the station was locally owned by WKQW (1120 AM), most recently broadcasting an adult contemporary format.

== History ==
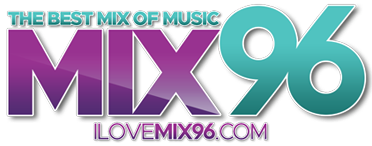
Last logo as Mix 96, used until the sale to EMF in 2022

In 1993, WKQW founder Stephen Olszowka successfully applied for an FM license, giving birth to WKQW-FM. The new station broadcast at 96.3 FM with an effective radiated power of 6,000 watts and went on the air with an oldies format, separate from WKQW's adult contemporary format (which would later become talk).

Stephen Olszowka died suddenly on February 14, 2004, at the age of fifty-four. Roughly a year after his death, his family made arrangements to sell WKQW-AM-FM to another owner, Clarion County Broadcasting. Following the takeover by William Hearst in 2005, WKQW-FM changed its format from oldies to 1980s-based adult contemporary.

In November 2018, the WKQW stations were purchased by Robert Lowe of Twilight Broadcasting, Inc; the purchase, at a price of $265,000, was consummated on February 12, 2019. The station was Twilight's first acquisition, and the company, owned by Bob Lowe, would later begin buying distressed stations in other areas of Pennsylvania, including WEEU in Reading and WXMT in Smethport, Pennsylvania. WKQW-FM maintained its programming under Lowe ownership, including a local morning show and local high school sports. Lowe acquired the logos and branding of WMSX in Buffalo, New York after that station rebranded as The Breeze at the same time.

In 2021, the Educational Media Foundation purchased WKQW-FM from Lowe for $192,000; the purchase was consummated on March 29, 2022. The call sign was changed to WLOQ on April 20, 2022, and the station was integrated into the K-Love network.

Ashley Midder, who earlier acquired WXMT, purchased the Mix 96 Web site and continues to maintain an Internet feed.
