= WKQW (AM) =

- Oil City, Pennsylvania; United States
- Frequency: 1120 kHz
- Branding: Fox Sports 104.1 & 1120

Programming
- Format: Sports
- Affiliations: Fox Sports Radio

Ownership
- Owner: Joe Ladanosky and Joe Wilkie; (J2 Media, LLC)

History
- First air date: December 1987

Technical information
- Licensing authority: FCC
- Facility ID: 63290
- Class: D
- Power: 1,000 watts day
- Transmitter coordinates: 41°23′45.00″N 79°39′53.00″W
- Translator: 104.1 W281CA (Oil City)

Links
- Public license information: Public file; LMS

WKQW (1120 AM) is a radio station broadcasting a sports format. It previously had an oldies format until July 13, 2012, and before that, a classic country format until August 15, 2008.

Licensed to Oil City, Pennsylvania, United States, the station is currently owned by Joe Ladanosky and Joe Wilkie, through licensee J2 Media, LLC. WKQW remains Venango County's only locally operated, programmed, and managed full-service radio station.

== History ==
WKQW was founded in 1982 by local broadcaster and engineer Stephen M. Olszowka, but did not go on the air until December 1987. For most of its early years, WKQW operated out of an office at 234 Elm Street in Oil City. The station moved to 222 Seneca Street in 1993 when WKQW-FM went on the air.

Olszowka died suddenly on February 14, 2004, at age fifty-four and ownership of the station passed to his mother Helen Gesing Olszowka. She sold the station less than a year later to William Hearst's Clarion County Broadcasting for $540,000.

In November 2018, the radio station, along with WKQW-FM, was sold to Robert Lowe, owner of Twilight Broadcasting, Inc. The sale, at a price of $265,000, was completed on February 12, 2019.

In July 2019, WKQW added an FM translator with assigned calls of W281CA at the frequency of 104.1 FM, broadcasting at a power of 250 watts.

Effective November 7, 2022, Twilight Broadcasting sold WKQW and translator W281CA to Joe Ladanosky and Joe Vilkie's J2 Media, LLC for $38,000.

WKQW closed its studio and office at 806C Grandview Road in Oil City in 2023, moving its operations to J2's central operations in Conneaut Lake.

== Gallery ==
Logo used during WKQW's classic country format. Last used in mid-August 2008

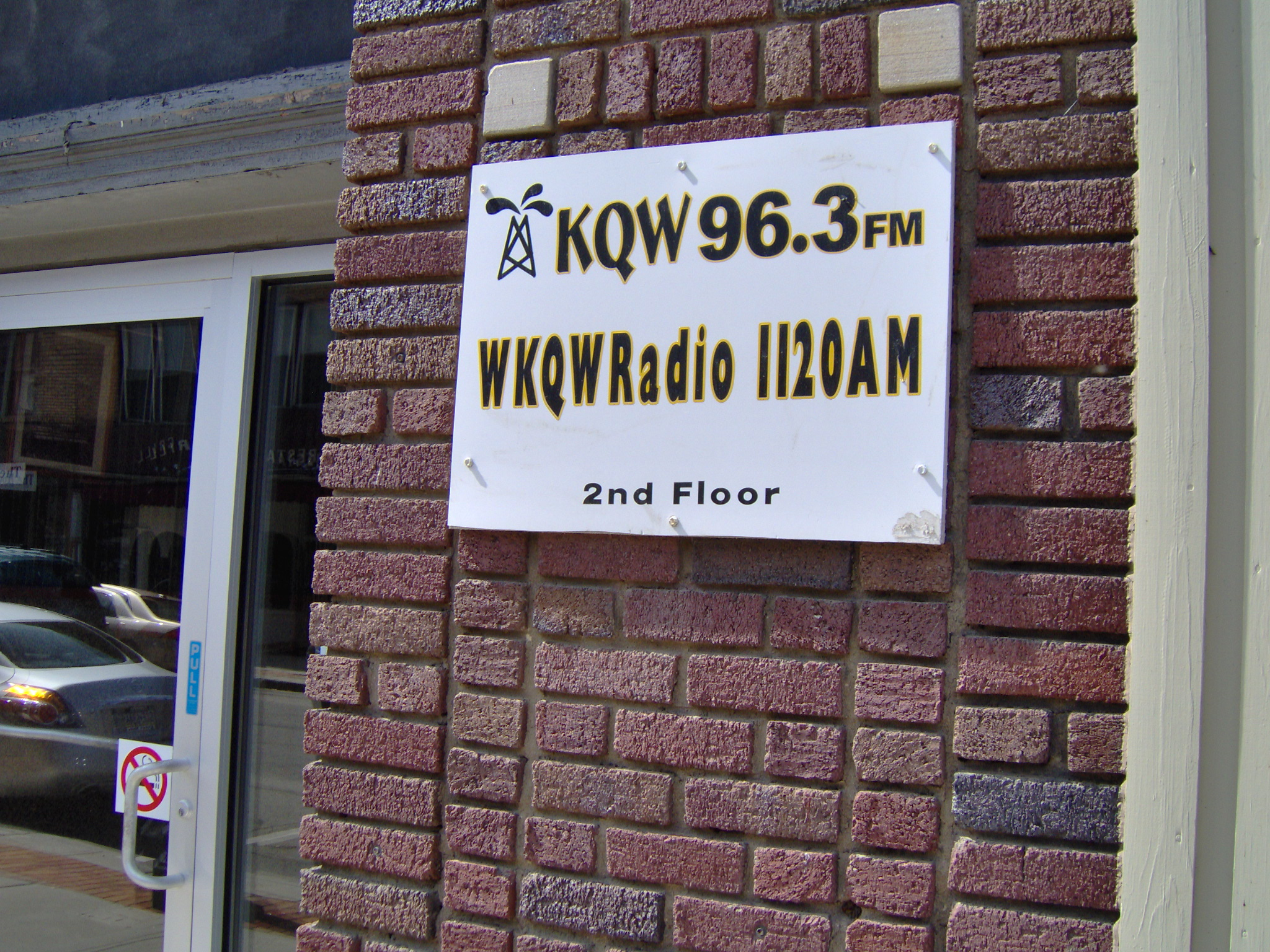
WKQW studio building from 1993 to 2010, at 222 Seneca Street, Oil City
