= WKST (AM) =

Radio station in New Castle, Pennsylvania

Simulcasting WYLE Grove City
- New Castle, Pennsylvania; United States
- Broadcast area: Lawrence County
- Frequency: 1280 kHz
- Branding: Willie 95.1 & 97.5

Programming
- Format: Classic country
- Affiliations: Pittsburgh Steelers Radio Network

Ownership
- Owner: Seven Mountains Media; (Southern Belle Media Family, LLC)
- Sister stations: WUZZ, WYLE

History
- First air date: October 23, 1938
- Former call signs: WKST (1938–1999); WBZY (1999–2004); WJST (2004–2018); WUZZ (2018–2023)

Technical information
- Licensing authority: FCC
- Facility ID: 24997
- Class: B
- Power: 4,900 watts (day); 1,000 watts (night)
- Transmitter coordinates: 40°57′14.00″N 80°19′5.00″W
- Translator: 97.5 W248DJ (New Castle)

Links
- Public license information: Public file; LMS
- Webcast: Listen live
- Website: mywillieradio.com

WKST (1280 kHz) is an AM radio station broadcasting a classic country format, simulcasting WYLE 95.1 FM Grove City. Licensed to New Castle, Pennsylvania, United States, it serves the Youngstown, Ohio area. The station is currently owned by Seven Mountains Media, through licensee Southern Belle Media Family, LLC.

== History ==
=== Beginnings as WBZY AM 1140 ===
The history of the current WUZZ can be traced back to the late 1960s. The station, known then as WBZY, signed on for the very first time August 25, 1968 from studios in the First National Bank building on Mill Street in downtown New Castle, marking the return of the call sign since 1964 when 990 AM in Torrington, CT was shut down. Under the ownership of Lawrence County Broadcasting Corporation, Robert Purcell served as company president and Robert Jolly served as station general manager.

WBZY began as a head-on competitor to WKST, which had already been on the air for thirty years at the time. One big difference between the two, however, was that WBZY, while operating as a strictly daytime-only operation, operated at a power of 5,000 watts from the time of its inception, while WKST operated at only a thousand at that time. WBZY at that time operated at the frequency of 1140 kHz, and had to sign-off at sundown in order to protect the clear channel WRVA, which also operated on this same frequency. Transmitter facilities were located five miles southwest of downtown New Castle near Vance and Gilmore Roads in North Beaver Township.

In 1972, WBZY moved its studios to Kennedy Square West in downtown New Castle, about three blocks west of its original location.

=== Move to 1200 kHz and first sale ===
In the early 1980s, WBZY was granted permission to move its frequency from 1140 to 1200 kHz. With the move came the addition of nighttime power, and the elimination of a directional antenna pattern operation during the daytime. However, the station would revert to directional antenna operation at night, and was required to reduce its power to a thousand watts. However, the changeover would not take place until 1987, as WBZY was sold in December 1986 by Lawrence County Broadcasting Corp. to a partnership called WBZY Radio Sam (the "Sam" representing the surname initials of partners Samuel M. Shirey, William G. Andrews and Robert L. McCracken, who served as general manager under the previous owner beginning in 1982).

After the sale was completed, the move from 1140 to 1200 took place. Concurrently with the frequency swap came another studio move, this time to 1906 Wilmington Road (PA 18).

=== Second sale and move from 1200 to 1280 ===
Andrews sold his share to the other two partners in 1991. WBZY was then sold to Jacor in April 1999 for $800,000, and Jacor was purchased by Clear Channel Communications shortly thereafter.

Clear Channel, which also owned WKST, recognized the superiority of WBZY's signal to that of WKST, and switched the call signs in November 1999. The call sign of WKST-FM was changed to WJST on October 10, 2000, and WKST-FM call sign was moved to Pittsburgh where it could be used with Clear Channel's KISS-FM brand.

=== Third sale ===
In April 2004, Clear Channel announced the sale of WKST along with WBZY and to Forever Broadcasting for $2.85 million, while WJST-FM and Grove City-based WICT were sold to Keymarket Communications of Pittsburgh, best known for the Froggy country music brand.

On September 20, 2004, the WJST call sign was moved to 1280 AM. WJST-FM became WKPL, playing an oldies format under the name "Pickle 92.1" (WICT, which already was a country station as "95.1 The Cat", changed its call sign to WWGY and was converted to the Froggy format), while WJST 1280 temporarily continued the adult contemporary music format from WJST-FM as "Star 1280" instead of "Star 92.1", before itself converting to an oldies format (unrelated to WKPL) as "Just Oldies 1280".

=== Fourth sale ===
It was announced on October 12, 2022 that Forever Media was selling 34 stations, including WUZZ, to State College-based Seven Mountains Media for $17.375 million. The deal closed on January 1, 2023.

== WUZZ today ==
In January 2009, the station switched to sports talk as an affiliate to Fox Sports Radio, joining fellow Fox Sports Radio station WBGG in Pittsburgh and going under the name "Fox Sports Radio 1280 WJST". It was at this point that the station became home to Penguins hockey and Pirates baseball. Various Penn State sports broadcasts take place on WJST as do many local high school football and basketball games. Local news coverage continues to be provided by Wade Sutton, who has handled news duties dating back to 1996 when the station was still using the WBZY call sign. On June 1, 2015, WJST became an affiliate of ESPN Radio.

The station changed its call sign to WUZZ on June 12, 2018.

In Mid March 2021, the station switched its format to classic hits under the branding "WUZZ 1280 & 97.5". This returns the WUZZ branding to the area that was formerly used on sister stations WRQI and WRQW from 2000 to 2018.

On October 16, 2023, WUZZ changed their format from classic hits (which moved to WHMJ 99.3 FM Franklin) to a simulcast of classic country-formatted WYLE 95.1 FM Grove City, branded as "Willie 95.1". That same day, the WUZZ callsign moved to 1200 kHz, while WKST moved to 1280 kHz.

== FM translator ==
Broadcast translator for WUZZ
Call sign	Frequency	City of license	FID	ERP (W)	Class	FCC info
W248DJ	97.5 FM	New Castle, Pennsylvania	202431	250	D	LMS

== Previous logo ==
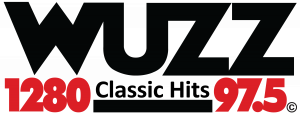
