= WUZZ (AM) =

Radio station in New Castle, Pennsylvania

Simulcasting WHMJ Franklin
- New Castle, Pennsylvania; United States
- Broadcast area: Lawrence County
- Frequency: 1200 kHz
- Branding: WUZZ Radio

Programming
- Format: Classic hits
- Affiliations: Penn State Nittany Lions

Ownership
- Owner: Seven Mountains Media; (Southern Belle Media Family, LLC)
- Sister stations: WKST, WYLE

History
- First air date: August 25, 1968
- Former call signs: WBZY (1968–1999); WKST (1999–2023)
- Former frequencies: 1140 kHz (1968–1982)

Technical information
- Licensing authority: FCC
- Facility ID: 71246
- Class: B
- Power: 5,000 watts (day); 1,000 watts (night)
- Transmitter coordinates: 40°56′22″N 80°23′38″W
- Translator: 97.9 W250CW (New Castle)

Links
- Public license information: Public file; LMS
- Webcast: Listen live
- Website: wuzzradio.com

WUZZ (1200 kHz) is a commercial AM radio station in New Castle, Pennsylvania, United States, serving Lawrence County. It has a classic hits format and is owned by Seven Mountains Media of State College, Pennsylvania, through licensee Southern Belle Media Family, LLC.

WUZZ is powered by day at 5,000 watts, using a non-directional antenna. But because AM 1200 is a clear channel frequency reserved for Class A WOAI San Antonio, WUZZ must reduce its power at night to 1,000 watts and use a directional antenna. The transmitter is off Gilmore Road near Interstate 376 in North Beaver Township.

== History ==
WKST signed on the air on October 23, 1938, but prior to November 5, 1999, it was at 1280 kHz. The original owner was Sam Townsend who operated the station until retiring to Florida in 1963. The call sign of the station was named after his wife and children (Wanda - Kim - Sam - Townsend). In the 1940s it was a Mutual Broadcasting System network affiliate. It carried Mutual's dramas, comedies, news, sports, soap operas, game shows, children's shows and big band broadcasts, during the "Golden Age of Radio".

In 1942, Alan Freed landed his first broadcasting job at WKST, before moving on to nearby WKBN Youngstown, Ohio, followed by WAKR Akron, and then WJW Cleveland — the station where Freed is credited with popularizing the term "rock and roll" to describe the music genre. By the 1970s, WKST was owned by Faye and Herb Scott, formerly based in Pottstown, Pennsylvania, and held in the name of Great Scott Broadcasting. Great Scott purchased FM station WFEM in Ellwood City, and it became WKST-FM on January 1, 1988. In the late 1990s, after the death of the Scotts, Great Scott decided to concentrate on its radio holdings in Delaware. It sold WKST and WKST-FM to Jacor Communications for $2.5 million in December 1998.

Prior to November 5, 1999, the 1200 kHz frequency was occupied by WBZY. WBZY began broadcasting in 1968. In December 1986, WBZY was sold by Lawrence County Broadcasting Corp. to a partnership called WBZY Radio Sam (the "Sam" representing the surname initials of partners Samuel M. Shirey, William G. Andrews and Robert L. McCracken). Andrews sold his share to the other two partners in 1991. WBZY was then sold to Jacor in April 1999 for $800,000. Jacor was purchased by Clear Channel Communications shortly thereafter.

Clear Channel, which also owned WKST, switched the call signs and formats in November 1999. The call sign of WKST-FM was changed to WJST on October 10, 2000, and the WKST-FM call sign was moved to Pittsburgh where it could be used with Clear Channel's KISS-FM brand. In April 2004, Clear Channel announced the sale of WKST along with WBZY and WJST (FM) to Forever Broadcasting for $2.85 million. On September 20, 2004, the WJST call sign was moved to 1280 AM, and WJST-FM became WKPL (FM).

It was announced on October 12, 2022 that Forever Media was selling 34 stations, including WKST, to State College-based Seven Mountains Media for $17.375 million. The deal closed on January 1, 2023.

On October 16, 2023 WKST changed their format from talk to a simulcast of classic hits-formatted WHMJ 99.3 FM Franklin, branded as "WUZZ Radio". That same day, the WKST callsign moved to 1280 kHz, while WUZZ moved to 1200 kHz.
