= List of radio stations formerly owned by NBC =

The following is a list of radio stations formerly owned by NBC via parent company RCA from 1926 until 1989. NBC formerly operated two radio networks in the United States: the NBC Radio Network from 1926 until 1987 (known as the NBC Red Network from 1926 to 1942) and the NBC Blue Network from 1926 until 1943 (known as the Blue Network from 1942 to 1945 and the American Broadcasting Company from 1945 onward).

Stations are arranged in alphabetical order by state and city of license.

- (**) indicates a station that was built and signed-on by RCA, either before or after NBC's formation.

== NBC Radio Network stations ==
AM Station	FM Station

City of license / Market	Station	Owned since	Current ownership
San Francisco, CA	KPO/KNBC/KNBR 680	1932–1989	owned by Cumulus Media
San Francisco, CA	KNBC-FM/KNBR-FM/; KNAI-FM/KYUU 99.7 **	1949–1988	KMVQ-FM, owned by Connoisseur Media
Denver–Boulder, CO	KOA 850	1930–1952	owned by iHeartMedia
Denver–Boulder, CO	KOA-FM 95.7 **	1949–1952	defunct; frequency occupied by KDHT
Hartford–New Britain, CT	WKNB 840	1956–1960	WRYM, owned by Trignition Media
Washington, D.C.	WRC 980 **	1923–1984	WTEM, owned by Audacy, Inc.
Washington, D.C.	WRC-FM/WKYS 93.9 **	1947–1988	owned by Radio One
Chicago, IL	WMAQ 670	1931–1987	WSCR, owned by Audacy, Inc.
Chicago, IL	WMAQ-FM/WJOI/; WNIS-FM/WKQX 101.1 **	1948–1988	owned by Cumulus Media
Boston, MA	WJIB 96.9	1983–1988	WBQT, owned by Beasley Broadcast Group
New York, NY	WEAF/WRCA/WNBC 660	1926–1988	WFAN, owned by Audacy, Inc.
New York, NY	WEAF-FM/WRCA-FM/; WNBC-FM/WNWS-FM/; WYNY 97.1 **	1940–1988	WQHT, owned by Mediaco Holding, Inc.
Cleveland, OH	WTAM/WKYC 1100	1930–1956; 1965–1972	WTAM, owned by iHeartMedia
Cleveland, OH	WTAM-FM/; WKYC-FM 105.7 **	1948–1956; 1965–1972	WMJI, owned by iHeartMedia
Philadelphia, PA	KYW/WRCV 1060	1956–1965	KYW, owned by Audacy, Inc.
Pittsburgh, PA	WJAS 1320	1957–1972	owned by Pittsburgh Radio Partners LLC
Pittsburgh, PA	WJAS-FM 99.7	1957–1972	WSHH, owned by Renda Media

== NBC Blue Network stations ==
AM Station

City of license / Market	Station	Owned since	Current ownership
San Francisco, CA	KGO 810	1930–1943	KSFO, owned by Cumulus Media
New York, NY	WJZ 770 **	1923–1943	WABC, owned by Red Apple Media (John Catsimatidis)
Chicago, IL	WENR 890	1931–1943	defunct; merged into WLS in 1954
Washington, D.C.	WMAL 630	1934–1941 (Note: Operated under a lease agreement with owner M. A. Leese.)	WSBN, owned by Cumulus Media

== Divestitures ==
General Electric purchased NBC's parent company, RCA, in early 1986. With the purchase, GE announced intentions to sell off the entirety of NBC's radio group and RCA's non-broadcast holdings, the latter spun off to Bertelsmann and Thomson SA. After a planned sale of the entire radio unit to Westinghouse Broadcasting in early 1987 fell through, Westwood One acquired the programming assets of the NBC Radio Network—including NBC's radio news service, The Source and Talknet—in a $50 million deal on July 20, 1987.

The NBC-owned radio stations were sold to various buyers. WMAQ was acquired by Westinghouse in November 1987. WNBC and WYNY in New York City, WKQX in Chicago, WJIB in Boston and KYUU in San Francisco were sold to Emmis Communications for a combined $121.5 million (equivalent to $331 million in 2025) on February 18, 1988. (As part of the deal, Emmis sold the licenses of their existing New York AM/FM combination, WFAN and WQHT, and transferred the intellectual properties of both stations onto WNBC and WYNY, respectively.) WKYS was sold to minority-controlled Albimar Communications on April 7, 1988, for $46.75 million (equivalent to $127 million in 2025). KNBR was the final radio property sold, with Susquehanna Radio Corporation purchasing it for $20 million (equivalent to $51.9 million in 2025) in March 1989.
