= WTLR =

Radio station in State College, Pennsylvania

- State College, Pennsylvania; United States
- Broadcast area: Central Pennsylvania
- Frequency: 89.9 MHz
- Branding: Way Truth Life Radio

Programming
- Format: Religious

Ownership
- Owner: Central Pennsylvania Christian Institute
- Sister stations: WQJU WPCL W230CC

History
- First air date: 1978
- Call sign meaning: Way Truth Life Radio

Technical information
- Licensing authority: FCC
- Facility ID: 9944
- Class: B
- ERP: 25,000 watts
- HAAT: 178 meters
- Transmitter coordinates: 40°53′32.0″N 77°51′49.0″W

Links
- Public license information: Public file; LMS
- Webcast: Listen Live
- Website: WTLR Online

WTLR is a Christian formatted broadcast radio station licensed to State College, Pennsylvania, serving Central Pennsylvania.

WTLR simulcasts its programming on co-owned WQJU 107.1, which broadcasts to the Mifflintown area as well as on WPCL 97.3 to the Northern Cambria/Ebensburgarea, WPMU 89.3 in DuBois, and on W230CC 93.9 Altoona.

WTLR, WQJU, WPCL, WPMU and W230CC are owned and operated by the Central Pennsylvania Christian Institute.

WTLR first signed on the air on January 1, 1978.

WTLR, WQJU, WPCL, WPMU, and W230CC are known on air as "Way Truth Life Radio". This is based on Jesus Christ's declaration in John 14:6, "I am the way, the truth, and the life. No one comes to the Father except through Me."

== Programming ==
Way Truth Life Radio is a full service Christian Inspirational radio ministry featuring quality Bible teaching, quality Christian music, helpful programs on family life, news and information.

Some of the programs heard on Way Truth Life Radio include:

"Insight for Living" with Chuck Swindoll
"Summit Life" with J.D. Greear
"Living on the Edge" with Chip Ingram
"The Alternative" with Dr. Tony Evans
"Family Life Today"
"Focus on the Family"
"Revive Our Hearts" with Nancy DeMoss Wolgemuth
"MoneyWise" with Rob West
"Truth for Life" with Alistair Begg
"A New Beginning" with Greg Laurie
"Grace to You" with John MacArthur
"Turning Point" with Dr. David Jeremiah
"In the Market With Janet Parshall" featuring Janet Parshall
"Haven Today" with Charles Morris

The ministry website is WTLR official website.

== WTLR in the News ==
On Friday, July 25, 2008, Ferguson Township police were dispatched to the Cato Avenue studios of WTLR as a man with a gun was on the way to the station.

Brian Neiman attempts, unsuccessfully, to run over police in the parking lot of WTLR.

When 50-year-old Brian Neiman of Pottersdale arrived at the radio station, police ordered him to stop. Neiman refused and reportedly became violent. Police say Neiman brandished a gun and drove at them in his Ford Bronco. Witnesses say "dozens of shots" were fired as Neiman exchanged gunfire with police.

After Neiman hit a second police cruiser, his SUV struck the side of a neighboring building and stopped. Centre County Coroner Scott Sayers pronounced Neiman dead on the scene.

Police aren't sure why Neiman targeted the radio station.

Neiman's ex-wife told The Centre Daily Times that "he struggled with bipolar disorder".

After the shooting, WTLR issued a statement and a recount of events on their website.
