= WCCS =

American radio station

Coordinates: 40°34′18″N 79°10′12″W

- Homer City, Pennsylvania; United States
- Broadcast area: Indiana, Pennsylvania; Johnstown, Pennsylvania
- Frequency: 1160 kHz
- Branding: 101.1 FM and AM 1160 WCCS

Programming
- Format: News/talk/sports
- Affiliations: Fox News Radio; Premiere Networks; Pittsburgh Pirates Radio Network; Pitt Panthers Radio Network; Westwood One Sports

Ownership
- Owner: Renda Media; (Renda Broadcasting Corporation)
- Sister stations: WDAD, WLCY, WQMU

History
- First air date: October 25, 1983; 42 years ago (as WRID)
- Former call signs: WRID (1983–1985)

Technical information
- Licensing authority: FCC
- Facility ID: 55250
- Class: B
- Power: 10,000 watts day 1,000 watts night
- ERP: 250 watts (FM)
- Translator: 101.1 W266CZ (Homer City)

Links
- Public license information: Public file; LMS
- Webcast: Listen Live
- Website: wccsradio.com

WCCS (1160 AM) is a commercially licensed American radio station in Homer City, Pennsylvania, about 50 miles northeast of Pittsburgh and 25 miles northwest of Johnstown, Pennsylvania. WCCS broadcasts with a maximum daytime power output of 10,000 watts and 1,000 watts at night. The station operates with a four-tower directional antenna pattern and programs a daily format of news/talk, sports talk, and local news/sports reports.

== History ==
=== Beginnings: A new AM in an FM world ===
WCCS was the brainchild of founders Mark Harley and Ray Goss, both of whom had served as general managers at radio stations in the area that were owned by Progressive Publishing, which also published the Clearfield Progress newspaper.

Goss left WDAD and WQMU in 1981 after being general manager for 15 years. Harley had also left WMAJ and WXLR after 11 years as general manager. Not long after they parted ways with their old stations, Harley called Goss and asked him about getting together to put a new station on the air.

"Mark told me 'what do you think about us putting a station on of our own?'," said Goss in an interview. "My response was 'with what?' Then he asked me how much equity I had in my house and if my wife was still working, and after thinking about it some more, I thought 'why not'." Harley, also a certified public accountant by education, complemented Goss' sales and marketing experience to make for a well-balanced partnership.

=== As WRID AM 1520 ===
The pair first considered obtaining a license in Ebensburg, Pennsylvania, about 20 miles from Goss' home base in Indiana. However, they later learned of a dormant construction permit for an AM station two miles south of Indiana in Homer City that had yet to sign on the air. The pair formed Raymark Broadcasting in 1982 and negotiated with Ridge Communications of Somerset (which then owned WVSC-AM-FM in Somerset) to buy the permit. They purchased acreage in an alfalfa field to erect a tower site and a studio building, and on October 25, 1983, the station signed on the air as "AM 1520 The Adult Address." The call letters were WRID (originally the choice for Ridge Communications) but were seldom used. The station was one of the first in the country to use satellite-delivered technology for its news and its adult contemporary music format, through an affiliation agreement with the Satellite Music Network (SMN).

Under Ridge Communications' brief period of ownership, WRID was ultimately granted a permit to operate at 5,000 watts daytime only at 1520 kHz. Ridge Communications had initially sought to operate at 1330 kHz at 1,000 watts in 1978, but this was challenged by NorLin Broadcasters, who was seeking this channel for WADJ (later WBHV, before going silent in 2011), a competing station in Somerset, Pennsylvania, which ultimately came to fruition. Another challenge was filed by Nationwide Communications which owned frequency-adjacent AM 1320 WKTQ (now WJAS) in Pittsburgh. Ridge Communications dropped its petition for 1330 kHz and opted for the 1520 kHz frequency instead at the higher power level.

Wishing to stay within budget, Raymark chose to operate the station at a more modest daytime directional signal of only 250 watts with the possibility of upgrades later. Exceeding their anticipated revenue goals after sign-on, they were able to double their initial assigned power in less than six months. The following year, the station increased its power to a full thousand watts but still retained its daytime-only status.

=== WCCS: AM-azing things ===
Raymark Broadcasting completed an aggressive move in 1986. Another station in Western Pennsylvania, WBZY successfully applied earlier to move from its daytime-only frequency of 1140 up to 1200 kHz. With this move, Raymark learned WRID could move to 1160 kHz and possibly have nighttime operation using the existing antenna system. Submitting an engineering plan, Raymark was granted permission to move its station to the new frequency.

With the frequency move came the new callsign WCCS. The call letters had been vacated by an FM station (now WOWQ), licensed to Somerset, and a then-competitor of WVSC. The station adopted the moniker "The AMazing AM", referring to its addition of AM stereo technology. The station first operated at 1160 kHz with 1,000 watts around the clock until the following year, when it was granted an increase to its originally permitted daytime power of 5,000 watts.

The station's power upgrades were completed in 1988 when it was given permission to increase its daytime power to 10,000 watts, making it the 8th most powerful AM radio signal in all of Pennsylvania. It was also a sigh of relief for Harley, who jokingly complained of an ongoing debt the station could never seem to overcome: "we kept buying transmitters".

Goss retired from WCCS in 1989, selling his interest in the station to Harley, who signed on an FM sister station, WOKW, licensed to Curwensville, (Clearfield County) later that fall. Like WCCS, WOKW also affiliated with SMN's adult contemporary format. Goss went on to publish his autobiography "Misadventures in Broadcasting" in 2008.

Harley maintained the Raymark company name and signed a third station on the air two years later, named WCCZ-FM that was licensed to Spangler (northern Cambria County). Today, that station, which has since been sold is known as WPCL.

== WCCS today ==
Harley sold WCCS in August 2002 to Pittsburgh-based Renda Broadcasting Corporation. He reserved his ownership of WOKW. Renda, owned by Indiana County native Anthony F. Renda, had entered into a local marketing agreement with successful competitor WLCY Blairsville that June, making WLCY a local sister station to WCCS. Renda purchased WLCY outright the following year.

In 2003, Renda also acquired WCCS/WLCY's crosstown competitors, WDAD/WQMU, for $3.2 million.

In need of additional studio space to accommodate four radio stations (WDAD, WCCS, WLCY, WQMU), Renda Broadcasting acquired the former Gatti Pharmacy building at the corner of 9th and Philadelphia Streets in downtown Indiana where the four stations and its business operations occupy the first and second floors. All four stations were housed in the new building by the end of 2004.

The stations have a long history of tenured personnel: Mark Bertig, who first joined WCCS in 1985 as a sales consultant, now serves as Regional Vice President and General Manager of the four Indiana stations, Jack Benedict has been with the four Indiana stations under different owners since 1969, Bill Otto has hosted "The Oldies Attic" since 1989, Todd Marino, host of Indiana In The Morning and newsman Josh Widdowson.

On January 14, 2008, after almost 25 years with its ABC/SMN affiliation, AM 1160 WCCS changed its format from full-service adult contemporary to News/Talk. Research through the IUP Small Business Institute found that the News/Talk format was the #1 programming preference in the area. #2 was country which precipitated the WLCY change to Country music in 2007.

WCCS dropped its affiliation with ABC News, picking up FOX Radio News for 24-hour coverage. Fox News reports on-air every thirty minutes during the weekday hours. During the evening hours and weekends, it carries sports programming from Westwood One Sports.

WCCS now also broadcasts on an FM "translator" frequency of 101.1 FM.

=== Sports ===
- Pittsburgh Pirates baseball

=== Local sports ===
Newstalk 1160 WCCS is the radio affiliate of the Homer-Center Wildcat football and basketball teams. The nine regular season football games are also broadcast on the Internet at www.msasports.net. Joining the award-winning broadcast team of Mark Bertig and Ward Hilliard in the 2007 season was Michael Bertig.
