= WLER-FM =

Coordinates: 40.8976°N 79.8892°W

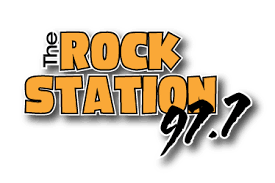
- Butler, Pennsylvania; United States
- Broadcast area: Butler, Pennsylvania / Pittsburgh
- Frequency: 97.7 MHz
- Branding: 97.7 The Rock Station

Programming
- Format: Mainstream rock
- Affiliations: United Stations Radio Networks

Ownership
- Owner: St. Barnabas Broadcasting, Inc.
- Sister stations: WBUT, WBVP, WISR, WJAS, WMBA

History
- First air date: August 4, 1954
- Former call signs: WBUT-FM (1954–2006)
- Call sign meaning: Butler Country

Technical information
- Licensing authority: FCC
- Facility ID: 71242
- Class: A
- ERP: 4,600 watts
- HAAT: 114 meters (374 ft)

Links
- Public license information: Public file; LMS
- Webcast: Listen live
- Website: 977rocks.com

WLER-FM (97.7 FM) is a mainstream rock radio station licensed to Butler, Pennsylvania, United States, serving Butler County and parts of northern Allegheny County, including Pittsburgh. WLER-FM is owned by St. Barnabas Broadcasting, a division of the Saint Barnabas Health System.

== Beginnings ==
=== As WISR-FM ===
WLER-FM's beginnings, like most FMs, were rather humble. The station began in 1949 as WISR-FM, when the AM license had been issued for those same call letters when the license was first granted in 1941. The ownership at that time, Butler Broadcasting Company, chose to turn the license back to the FCC after having the FM license failed to make any kind of an impact financially.

=== As WBUT-FM ===
However, the license was recovered years later by WISR's AM crosstown competitor, WBUT, returning to the air in 1959. The station operated as WBUT-FM for many years until the late 1970s, when the call letters were changed to WLER-FM, and the station began to originate more of its own separate programming, though much of it was done through voice-tracked automation on a 10-inch reel tape-based automation system constructed by owners Bob and Ron Brandon. The station was an adult contemporary formatted station for much of its existence, using music and personalities provided by Concept Productions, based in Roseville, California. The procedure of voice-tracking was a relatively new concept at the time, before becoming standard practice in the late 1990s. The presentation of the voice-tracked announcers led many to believe that Steve Tyler, Dave Ware, and Terry Nelson were all on-site. The station simulcast from 6 to 8am during morning drive and during the last three hours of the day before signing off at 10pm.

=== As WLER-FM and format changes to hot adult contemporary & adult contemporary ===
WLER saw its biggest change in the spring of 2006, when the WBUT simulcast ended and the station began to take on a more Adult CHR (Top 40)-oriented approach. Where its two AM affiliate stations tend to serve Butler County, WLER gravitates more towards the suburbs north of Pittsburgh, as well as surrounding communities such as Grove City, Franklin, Mercer, Kittanning, and New Kensington.

Since the flip of WLTJ to adult top 40, WLER-FM returned to its adult contemporary format, being the only station in Pittsburgh similar to its WSHH rival, but becoming similar to Kansas City's KZPT in terms of sound. It also carried the Hollywood Confidential show as well. WLER-FM is reported as AC on RadioStationWorld.com, but does not report to Mediabase or Nielsen BDS.

WLER-FM is one of the few AC stations in Pennsylvania not broadcasting wall-to-wall Christmas music from the weeks of November–December (until the 26th) and one of the few major-market AC stations to stick to its AC format from November–December (a trend done with WMJX Boston which started playing wall-to-wall christmas music every holiday season since 2013), although its WSHH rival airs them.

=== Format change to "The Rock Station" ===
During the Memorial Day Weekend of 2012, WLER-FM flipped its format from adult contemporary to active rock and is now branded as "The Rock Station" with new imaging. This left only WSHH for the adult contemporary audience.

The station flipped from All Hitz 97.7 to The Rock Station on May 25, 2012 at 4:45 PM. The last song as an adult contemporary station was Nickelback's "Someday". The stunting then began with "All Radio is dead" and a montage of All Hitz 97.7 promos and music was played. Then it was announced. "Surprise. Here's something to remember this Memorial Day Weekend. We kicked All Hitz to the curb. Welcome to your new home for rock. The Rock Station 977 WLER-FM. Butler. Cranberry.". The first song on The Rock Station was Def Leppard's "Rock Of Ages".

=== Additional Programs ===
The Rock Show - Morning show with Jay Kline weekdays from 6-10 am

Rock Fabrik with Bob Cupp - Saturdays at 10 pm

The Grass Roots Show - Sundays at 7

WLER is home to Slippery Rock University Football.
