= G107 =

G107 may refer to:

- China National Highway 107
- WGSM (a.k.a. G107), a Classic Hits radio station serving the Westmoreland County area
