= WSGL =

Coordinates: 26.127°N 81.721°W

- Naples, Florida; United States
- Broadcast area: Southwest Florida
- Frequency: 104.7 MHz (HD Radio)
- Branding: Mix 104.7

Programming
- Format: Hot adult contemporary

Ownership
- Owner: Renda Media; (Renda Broadcasting Corporation of Nevada)
- Sister stations: WGUF; WJGO; WWGR

History
- First air date: May 10, 1980
- Former frequencies: 97.7 MHz (1980–1982); 103.1 MHz (1982–1999)
- Call sign meaning: Seagull (former mascot)

Technical information
- Licensing authority: FCC
- Facility ID: 63357
- Class: C2
- ERP: 20,000 watts
- HAAT: 132 meters (433 ft)

Links
- Public license information: Public file; LMS
- Webcast: Listen Live
- Website: www.1047mixfm.com

WSGL (104.7 FM) is a commercial radio station licensed to Naples, Florida, United States, and serving Southwest Florida. It is owned by Renda Media with studios on Race Track Road in Bonita Springs. WSGL airs a hot adult contemporary format branded as "Mix 104.7".

WSGL is a Class C2 station. The transmitter tower is on Country Road off Santa Barbara Boulevard in South Naples.

== History ==
The station first received its construction permit from the Federal Communications Commission in 1978. It took two years to build the station. It signed on the air on May 10, 1980. WSGL broadcast on 97.7 MHz as country music station "FM 98 WSGL".

The station moved its new frequency to 103.1 in 1982, retaining the country format until 1986. The former 97.7 frequency is now home to WTLQ-FM in the Fort Myers radio market. WSGL then changed its format to adult contemporary as "Class 103" in early November 1986.

In September 1992, the station briefly returned to its former country format as "Hot Country 103", but that did not last long as it switched back to adult contemporary in April 1993.

In 1999, WSGL was granted a power increase to 20,000 watts. It moved to its new frequency at 104.7 with the new name "Mix 104.7".
