= WHJB =

Radio station located in Unity Township, Pennsylvania

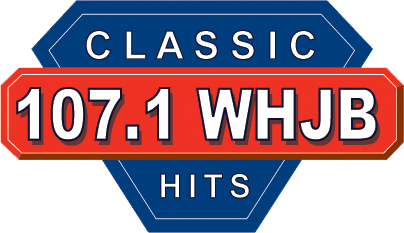
- Greensburg, Pennsylvania; United States
- Broadcast area: Pittsburgh, Pennsylvania
- Frequency: 107.1 MHz
- Branding: 107.1 WHJB

Programming
- Format: Classic hits

Ownership
- Owner: Renda Media; (The St. Pier Group LLC)
- Sister stations: WLCY; WSHH

History
- First air date: July 8, 1968
- Former call signs: WHJB-FM (1968–1986); WOKU-FM (1986–1987); WSSZ (1987–2004); WJJJ (2004–2006); WGSM (2006–2009)
- Call sign meaning: H.J. Brennen (founder of WHJB)

Technical information
- Licensing authority: FCC
- Facility ID: 72296
- Class: A
- ERP: 2,300 watts
- HAAT: 163 meters
- Transmitter coordinates: 40°15′54.3″N 79°20′23.1″W

Links
- Public license information: Public file; LMS
- Webcast: Listen live
- Website: www.whjbfm.com

WHJB (107.1 MHz) is a classic hits radio station licensed to Greensburg, Pennsylvania, and serving the Westmoreland County, Pennsylvania area. The station is owned by Renda Media.

WHJB's transmitter is located in Unity Township, Pennsylvania, and broadcasts with an ERP of 2.3 kW.

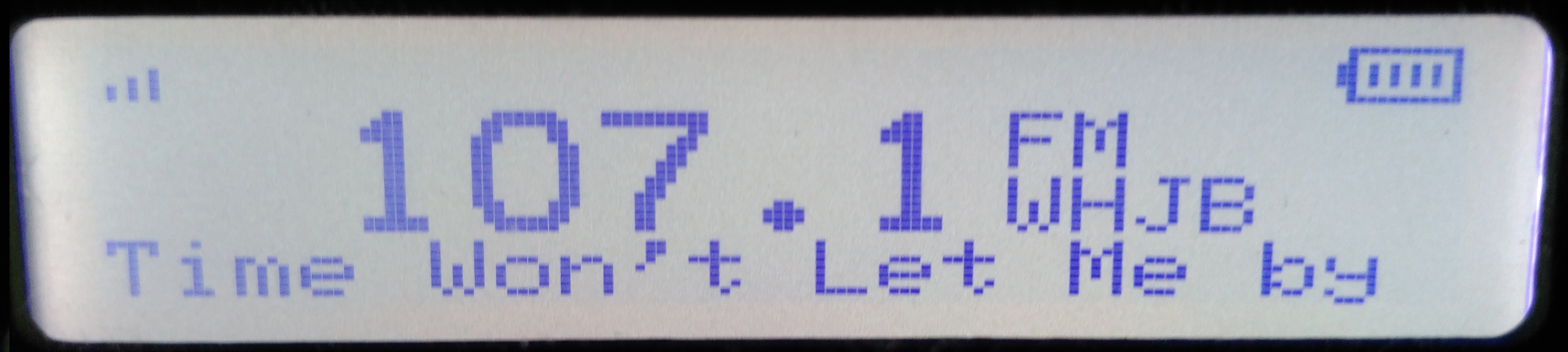
WHJB on a SPARC HD Radio with RDS.

== History ==
The station began as WHJB-FM in 1968, sister station to then-WHJB (now WKHB), then became WOKU-FM, before becoming WSSZ-FM in the late 1980s. In 1996, the station became a simulcast of WAMO-FM to cover the eastern part of the metro Pittsburgh market. The simulcast was initiated as part of a sale of the FM station to Sheridan Broadcasting that year.

In 2003, WSSZ became a simulcast of WAMO after the 106.7 signal moved its tower and improved its coverage of Pittsburgh. WSSZ, in turn, moved its tower further away from Pittsburgh to accommodate WAMO-FM's move.

In 2004, 107.1 acquired the WJJJ calls, and changed its name to "Majic 107.1," but the programming remained the same.

On January 30, 2006, Sheridan sold 107.1 to The St. Pier Group LLC (Renda Broadcasting), which changed the format to Variety Hits, using Westwood One's "SAM" satellite-delivered format and taking the call letters WGSM. The satellite format was eventually dropped.

In October 2009, the station applied for (and was granted) the call letters WHJB, and began using the callsign on February 8, 2010.
