= WJGO =

Radio station in Tice, Florida, United States

Coordinates: 26.488°N 81.929°W

- Tice, Florida; United States
- Broadcast area: Southwest Florida - Cape Coral - Fort Myers
- Frequency: 102.9 MHz (HD Radio)
- Branding: 102.9 Bob FM

Programming
- Format: Adult hits

Ownership
- Owner: Renda Media; (Renda Broadcasting Corp. of Nevada)
- Sister stations: WGUF, WSGL, WWGR

History
- First air date: 1999

Technical information
- Licensing authority: FCC
- Facility ID: 25568
- Class: C1
- ERP: 96,000 watts
- HAAT: 142 meters (466 ft)

Links
- Public license information: Public file; LMS
- Webcast: Listen live
- Website: 1029bobfm.com

WJGO (102.9 FM) is a commercial radio station licensed to Tice, Florida, United States, and serving Southwest Florida including Cape Coral and Fort Myers. It is owned by Renda Media and it airs an adult hits format, branded as "Bob FM". WJGO's transmitter is sited off Safety Lane in Fort Myers, while the studios and offices are on Race Track Road in Bonita Springs.

== History ==
The station signed on the air in 1999. It originally broadcast on 102.9 FM after radio station WSGL in Naples moved from 103.1 to 104.7.

WJGO debuted airing the Jones Radio Networks' Rhythmic Oldies format. Jones abandoned that format in 2001, and WJGO began programming in-house a Rhythmic Oldies format known as "Groovin' Oldies 102.9." On March 16, 2007, the station changed to its current adult hits format as "Bob FM".
