= WQMU =

Coordinates: 40.638°N 79.146°W

- Indiana, Pennsylvania; United States
- Broadcast area: Indiana / Latrobe / Johnstown, Pennsylvania
- Frequency: 92.5 MHz
- Branding: U-92.5

Programming
- Format: Hot adult contemporary
- Affiliations: Westwood One; IUP Crimson Hawks; Penguins Radio Network

Ownership
- Owner: Renda Media
- Sister stations: WLCY, WDAD, WCCS

History
- First air date: August 14, 1968 (at 103.1)
- Former frequencies: 103.1 MHz (1968–1997)
- Call sign meaning: Quality Music

Technical information
- Licensing authority: FCC
- Facility ID: 56644
- Class: A
- ERP: 3,000 watts
- HAAT: 100 meters

Links
- Public license information: Public file; LMS
- Webcast: Listen live
- Website: www.u92radio.com

WQMU is a hot adult contemporary radio station broadcast on 92.5 FM. It is owned and operated by Renda Media.

== History ==
WQMU signed on in August 1968 at 103.1 MHz. From the day of its first sign-on until January 1990, WQMU was mostly automated, with formats varying from beautiful music to album rock, with music delivered on 10-inch reel-to-reel tape. The WQMU call letters alluded to its position statement promising Quality MUsic'. The station did however, air a live morning show program for many of its years, hosted by Mike Cavanagh, who was with the station since its sign-on in 1968 until 2007.

In January 1990, WQMU began a relationship with the Transtar Radio Network (now Westwood One), first affiliating with the network's "Niche 29" format of classic rock and Top 40. The network later changed the name of the format to "Adult Rock 'n Roll", and the Transtar affiliation was later dropped in favor of another affiliation agreement with the Jones Satellite Network in Colorado Springs, Colorado.

The station moved to 92.5 after then owner RMS Media petitioned the FCC for an FM license north of Indiana at 103.3 FM in Brookville. In order for the new station to go on the air, WQMU would have to move its frequency, which took place in 1997.

WQMU was then marketed as "The Planet" and continue to play Adult Rock 'n Roll until 2000. That year, U-92.5 was born with a U2 tour tie in. Many changes were taking place in the business and airstaff positions, the biggest coming in 2004.

Renda Broadcasting had already acquired rival stations WCCS & WLCY with plans of relocating them to a renovated building at 840 Philadelphia St., in downtown Indiana, PA. In 2004 RMS Media Management finalized the sale of both WQMU and WDAD to Renda.

In need of additional studio space to accommodate four radio stations (WDAD, WCCS, WLCY, WQMU), Renda Broadcasting acquired the former Gatti Pharmacy building at the corner of 9th and Philadelphia Streets in downtown Indiana, where the four stations and its business operations occupy the first and second floors.

WQMU is now marketed as U92.5, using a new logo designed to tie in closely with the changing mascot of IUP. The new location has 3 studios with ground level windows looking into the busy intersection at 9th and Philadelphia Streets. WQMU is slightly tucked into the building down 9th, but the studio is still visible from the sidewalk.

== Sports ==
Since 2006, WQMU has been the voice of IUP Crimson Hawk Sports with Sports Director Jack Benedict. Starting in 2007, WQMU became the home for Pittsburgh Penguins hockey. U92.5 FM is also the local affiliate station for the Pittsburgh Steelers Football Network.

=== Local Sports ===
WQMU features Heritage Conference football games in the Fall and many basketball games in the Winter.
