= WGUF =

Radio station in Marco, Florida, US

- Marco, Florida; United States
- Broadcast area: Naples and Southwest Florida
- Frequency: 98.9 MHz
- Branding: 98.9 The Gulf

Programming
- Format: Soft oldies

Ownership
- Owner: Renda Media; (Renda Broadcasting Corp. of Nevada)
- Sister stations: WJGO, WSGL, WWGR

History
- First air date: 1990
- Call sign meaning: Gulf Coast

Technical information
- Licensing authority: FCC
- Facility ID: 28903
- Class: A
- ERP: 6,000 watts
- HAAT: 100 meters (330 ft)
- Transmitter coordinates: 26°3′10.00″N 81°42′11.00″W

Links
- Public license information: Public file; LMS
- Webcast: Listen live
- Website: 989thegulf.com

WGUF (98.9 FM) is a commercial radio station licensed to Marco, Florida, United States, and serving the Naples area of Southwest Florida. It airs a soft oldies music format known as "98.9 The Gulf" and is owned by Renda Media, with studios on Race Track Road in Bonita Springs.

== History ==
WGUF first signed on the air in 1990. It was originally on 92.7 MHz, moving to its current dial position a few years later. It was owned by Rowland Gulf Broadcasting, Inc., with Marshall Rowland Sr. as the president and Stephen Rowland as the general manager. The format was easy listening music. WGUF was an affiliate of the ABC Entertainment Network.

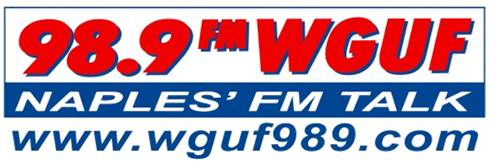
Previous logo

In 1997, it was acquired by Renda Broadcasting in a $2 million deal. Renda later switched the station to a conservative talk format.

On November 1, 2026, the station changed its format to soft oldies as "98.9 The Gulf."

== Programming ==
Music programming
