= WBUT =

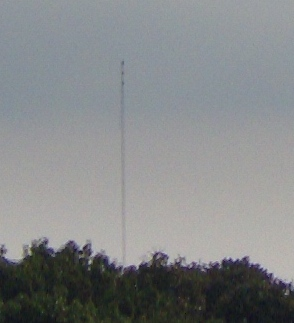
- WBUT broadcast tower, located in Center Township.
- Butler, Pennsylvania; United States
- Broadcast area: Pittsburgh metropolitan area
- Frequency: 1050 kHz
- Branding: 1050 AM and 97.3 FM WBUT

Programming
- Format: Country
- Affiliations: ABC News Radio; Premiere Networks; Westwood One; Performance Racing Network

Ownership
- Owner: St. Barnabas Broadcasting, Inc.
- Sister stations: WBVP; WISR; WLER-FM; WMBA

History
- First air date: March 14, 1949
- Call sign meaning: "Butler County"

Technical information
- Licensing authority: FCC
- Facility ID: 71241
- Class: D
- Power: 500 watts (day); 62 watts (night)
- Transmitter coordinates: 40°53′51.2″N 79°53′20.2″W
- Translator: 97.3 W247DF (Butler)

Links
- Public license information: Public file; LMS
- Webcast: Listen live
- Website: www.wbut.com

WBUT (1050 AM) is a commercial radio station, licensed to Butler, Pennsylvania, in the northern suburbs of the Pittsburgh metropolitan area. It is owned by St. Barnabas Broadcasting, a division of the Saint Barnabas Health System, along with its sister stations WJAS, WBVP, WMBA, WISR and WLER-FM.

WBUT carries a gold-based country radio format, along with local news, sports and weather. WBUT is an MRN and PRN affiliate carrying NASCAR, a Penn State Football Network affiliate, and also carries Butler Area Senior High School football and basketball games. Its studios and offices are at 252 Pillow Street, where it shares space with sister stations WISR and WLER-FM. Its transmitter facility is located on Tower Lane behind the Clearview Mall in Center Township, and is co-located with its translator, WLER-FM, WISR's translator at 107.5, and a Family Life Radio repeater station at 88.3 MHz.

By day, WBUT transmits with 500 watts. As 1050 AM is a clear channel frequency, the station must reduce power at night to 62 watts to avoid interference. Programming is also heard on 250-watt FM translator W247DF at 97.3 MHz.

== History ==
WBUT first applied for a construction permit from the Federal Communications Commission in March 1946, and had considered the frequencies of 1230, 1600, and 1430 kHz before finally settling on 1580 kHz, which was granted by the FCC in August 1948.

The station first signed on the air in 1949 and was first owned by the Wise family, which also published The Butler Eagle, Butler's daily newspaper, doing business as Eagle Printing Company. J. Leonard Taylor served as the station's first general manager.

The station first operated from the Nixon Hotel in downtown Butler, where Morgan Center stands today.

WRYO, a radio station that debuted at 1050 kHz in 1948 in Rochester, Pennsylvania, in adjacent Beaver County, Pennsylvania, failed by 1952, leaving its frequency available for WBUT to switch to. Like WRYO, WBUT was a 250-watt station as a daytimer until its current tower in Center Township was built in 1979. WBUT began broadcasting from this new tower in 1980, and was subsequently allowed to double its power to the current value of 500 watts, but still retained its daytime-only operational status.

With the frequency swap, came its first change in ownership. The new WBUT, along with co-owned WBUT-FM 103.9 MHz, were sold to Beacom Broadcasting Enterprises in 1953, headed by J. Patrick Beacom. WBUT-FM was sold and the station relocated to Mercer County, Pennsylvania.

A few years later, WBUT successfully applied for another FM broadcasting license at 97.7 MHz, which coincidentally, once belonged to its competitor, WISR (AM), before it returned the license an unnecessary expense. The call letters of the station at FM 97.7 were changed to WBUT-FM, with the two stations simulcasting. In 1965 the Federal Communications Commission (FCC) enacted new rules, calling for AM-FM combo stations to offer unduplicated programming at least half of the broadcast day.

The stations were purchased by Larry Berg in 1964, who did business as WBUT, Inc. For a time during the 1960s, the studios and transmitter were located on a hill south of Downtown Butler, near the Meadowood residential plan.

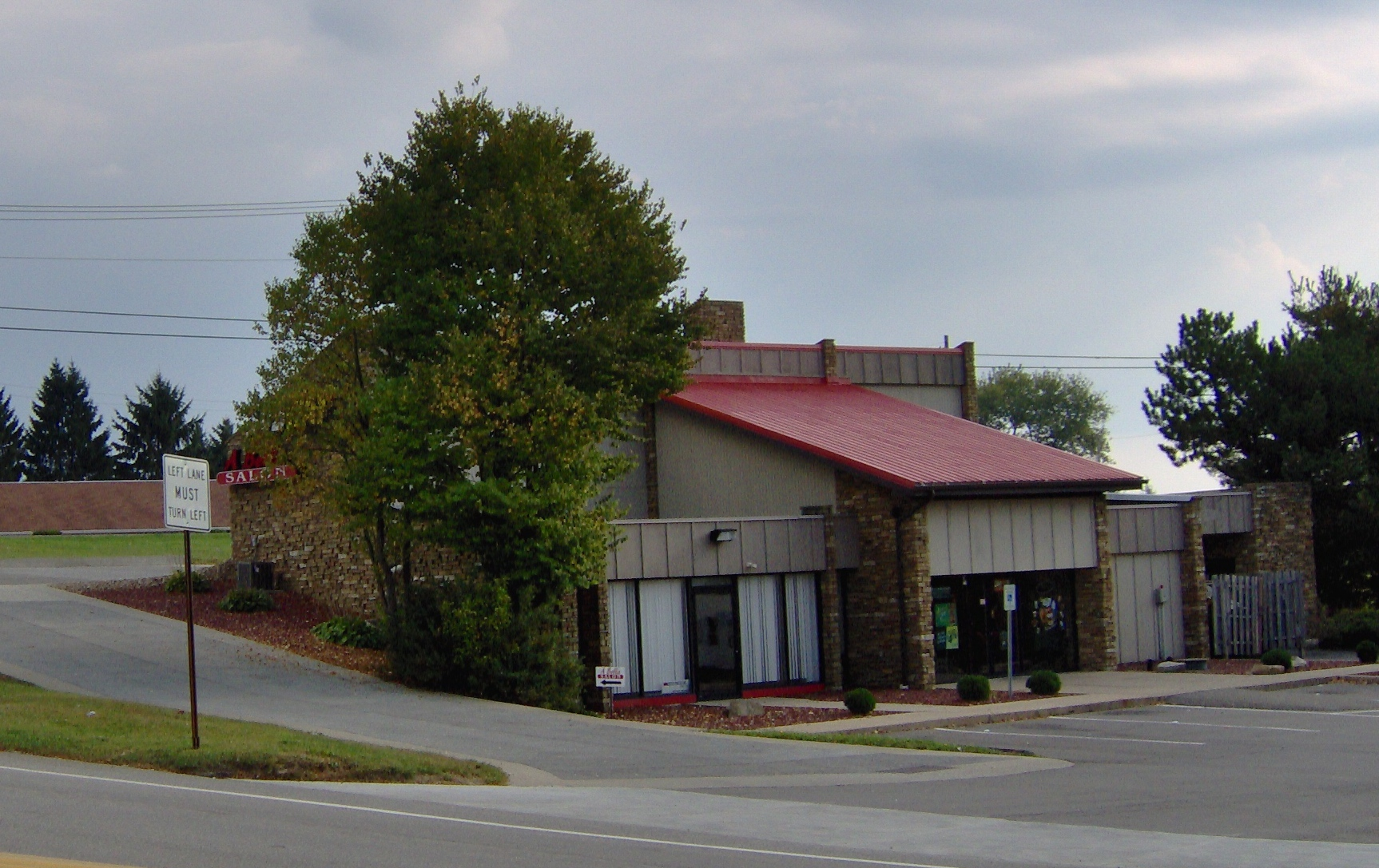
WBUT and WLER studio location at 1758 North Main Street Extension (PA Route 8) in Center Township, at the corner of Mercer Road. This location was home to both stations from 1987 to 2003.

WBUT-AM-FM was sold on July 14, 1978, from Larry Berg to Brandon Communications Systems, Incorporated, a company headed by Robert C. "Bob" Brandon and his brother Ronald. (Berg would later join the staff of then-competitor WISR as a sales rep and talk show host.) However, the licensee remained under the name WBUT Inc.

Not long after acquiring the two stations, Brandon moved both from their downtown Butler location at the Nixon Hotel to a Center Township office and then across the street to a former Citizens' Bank branch north of Butler at the intersection of Route 8 (a.k.a. North Main Street Extension) and Mercer Road in Center Township.

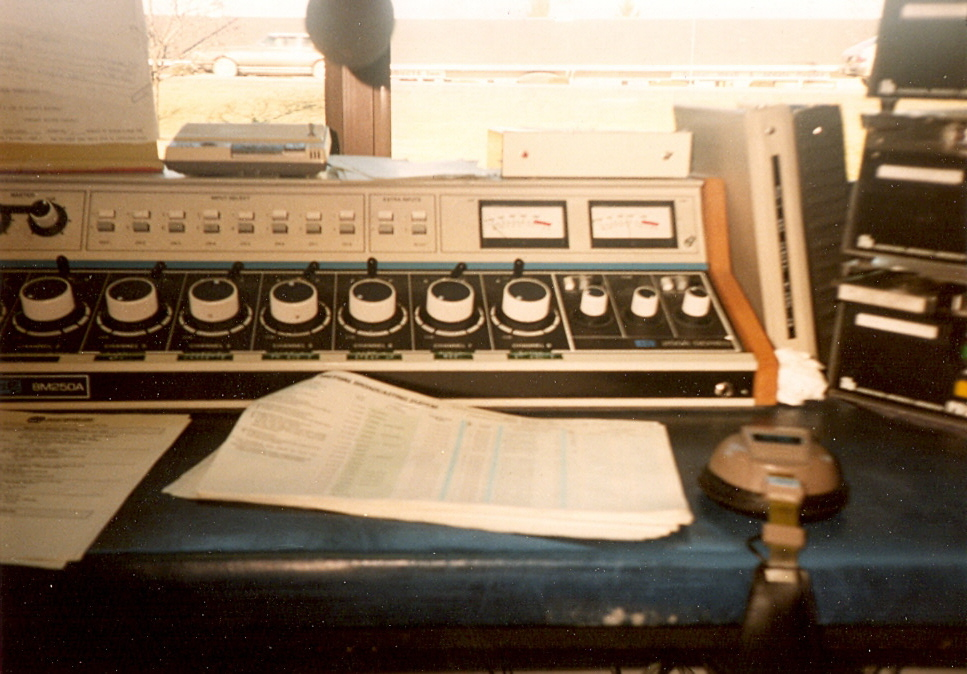
WBUT on-air studio console, a Broadcast Electronics 8M250A, taken at the station's former location in Center Township in 1990.

When the decision was made to separate the AM and FM stations, Brandon used his knowledge in broadcast engineering to construct an automation system capable of providing live-sounding programming on his FM station, now assigned the call letters WLER-FM. WBUT and WLER would both sign on at 6 am, simulcast its morning show for two hours, break away at 8 am, and then rejoin at 7 pm before signing off at 10 pm.

Music and voice-tracked disc jockeys were provided by Concept Productions, based in Roseville, California. Personalities like Steven Tyler, Dave Ware, and Terry Nelson were all thought to be on-site announcers. While these announcers aired on WLER, WBUT aired more local news and information intensive programming, with popular shows like "The Super Store", a buy-sell-trade program allowing listeners to sell unwanted items or find others for sale, and "Speak Up", a locally produced talk show that ran after the noon news.

WBUT and WLER welcomed a third station into the fold, longtime crosstown competitor 680 WISR, in 1997, following its sale by Butler Broadcasting, Inc. The Brandon brothers then changed the name of their company to the Butler County Radio Network. Within a few years, the Brandons would sell their interests, along with their partners, to a group of four new owners, who continued to do business as the Butler County Radio Network.

A near-tragedy took place in the summer of 1990 when then-program director Shirley A. "Sam" Minehart was changing an automation tape for WLER. The automation system was separated by a large plate-glass window from outside, that would allow Route 8 commuters to see programming at work. A vehicle traveling on Route 8 went out of control and crashed through the window and into the automation system. Minehart had just walked away from the system as the car crashed through the window, scattering shards of glass everywhere.

WBUT news reporter Dave Cubbison was on the air delivering a live newscast when he looked up and saw the car coming towards the building, yelling to Minehart "Oh no, there's a car coming... run!" into an open microphone. Knowing the car was going to hit, Cubbison then ran and dove under a desk. Cubbison and Minehart were not hurt, but the driver did sustain minor injuries.

The station switched from oldies to country music early in 2006. Morning show host Bob Cupp has been with the station for more than 25 years. In 2003, WBUT and WLER moved from their studio building in Center Township and joined WISR in a new facility at the Pullman Commerce Center, on the city's south side, near the village of Lyndora. The station moved to its current location on Pillow Street in Butler in the summer of 2012.

WBUT for many years had been a Mutual Broadcasting System network affiliate. Upon the acquisition of Mutual by Westwood One, WBUT affiliated with co-owned CNN Radio. This relationship continued until 2009, when WBUT changed its affiliation to CBS Radio News.

Logo before translator sign on

In April 2018, WBUT added an FM translator at 97.3 MHz, W247DF, allowing listeners who prefer FM radio to hear the station on that band. In July 2022, Inside Radio reported that WBUT and its affiliate stations would be sold to Pittsburgh Radio Partners. The sale closed on September 2, 2022. Less than 2 months later, St. Barnabas Broadcasting, a division of St. Barnabas Health System of Gibsonia, announced that it would acquire WBUT and its affiliate stations from Pittsburgh Radio Partners. The purchase was consummated on February 14, 2023, at a price of $2.55 million.
