= WBVP =

Radio station in Beaver Falls, Pennsylvania

Coordinates: 40°44′16″N 80°17′47″W

Beaver Falls, Pennsylvania; United States
- Broadcast area: Beaver County
- Frequency: 1230 kHz
- Branding: The Beaver

Programming
- Format: country-rock
- Affiliations: ABC News Radio; Fox News Radio; Salem Radio Network; Townhall News; Pittsburgh Penguins Radio Network; Pittsburgh Pirates Radio Network

Ownership
- Owner: St. Barnabas Broadcasting, Inc.
- Sister stations: WJAS, WBUT, WLER-FM, WISR, WMBA

History
- First air date: 1948
- Call sign meaning: Beaver Falls, Pennsylvania

Technical information
- Licensing authority: FCC
- Facility ID: 52746
- Class: C
- Power: 1,000 watts unlimited
- Translator: 99.3 W257EA (Beaver Falls)

Links
- Public license information: Public file; LMS
- Webcast: Listen Live
- Website: beavercountyradio.com

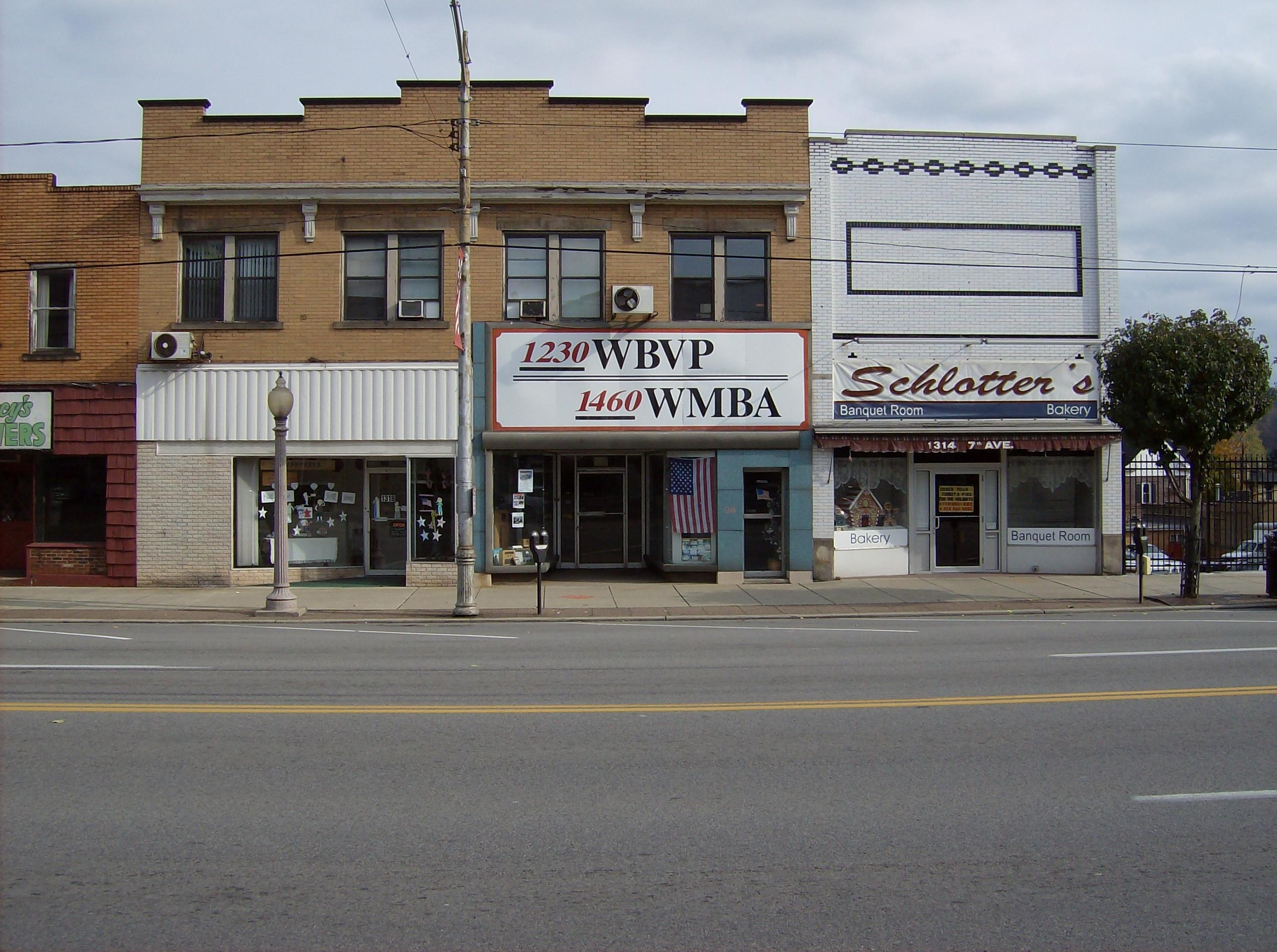
WBVP/WMBA headquarters

WBVP (1230 AM) is a commercial radio station based in Beaver County, Pennsylvania. It had simulcast a news/talk radio format with WMBA. On September 16, 2023, WMBA switched to a country-rock hybrid called The Beaver. WBVP is owned by St. Barnabas Broadcasting, Inc., a division of the Saint Barnabas Health System. The studios and offices are on Seventh Avenue in Beaver Falls, Pennsylvania.

WBVP’s power is 1,000 watts, using a non-directional antenna and is licensed to Beaver Falls and is simulcast on 250-watt FM translator W257EA at 99.3 MHz in Beaver Falls.

== Programming ==
Weekdays begin on WBVP with a local news and information show, hosted by Matt Drzik. Local talk shows are heard in late mornings, followed by a half-hour newscast at noon. The rest of the weekday schedule is made up of nationally syndicated conservative talk shows from the Salem Radio Network: Dennis Prager, Sebastian Gorka, Larry Elder, Dan Proft, Mike Gallagher and Hugh Hewitt. (Many of the shows are also heard on WPGP 1250 AM in Pittsburgh, which is owned by the Salem Media Group.)

Weekends feature repeats of weekday shows, a Saturday afternoon oldies show and Sunday morning religious programs. Both stations carry play-by-play of Pittsburgh Steelers football, Pittsburgh Penguins hockey and Pittsburgh Pirates baseball games. World and national news is supplied by ABC News Radio and Townhall News.

== History ==
=== WBVP ===
The station signed on the air on May 25, 1948, and was founded by Tom Price, Frank Smith and Charles Ondurka, all from Pittsburgh. In 1955, the original partners reorganized and formed Beaver Valley Broadcasting.

Around 1970, Hall Communications bought WBVP along with an FM radio station, originally known as WBVP-FM at 106.7 MHz, that had been put on the air in 1968. In 1985, Ted and Marilee Ruscitti from Hopewell Township, Pennsylvania bought WBVP and the FM station, through their company, MT Communications. By this point, the call sign had been changed to WWKS.

In 1990, The stations were sold to the Baltimore Radio Show in Towson, Maryland with Harry Shriver serving as managing partner. Carnegie, Pennsylvania-native Frank Iorio, Jr., along with partners Aaron Daniels and Mike Swartz, formed Pittsburgh Radio Partners and bought the two stations in 1994. Just a year later, the trio sold the FM station, WWKS, to Secret Communications. At that time Iorio bought out his partners and continued to own and operate WBVP through his newly formed company, Iorio Broadcasting, Inc. Iorio then bought WMBA from Donn Communications in 2000. Long time station employee, Mark Peterson along with his wife, Cyndi, Formed Sound Ideas Media, LLC, and purchased WBVP and WMBA in 2014.

In 2019, an FM translator station for WBVP, W257EA at 99.3 MHz, was put on the air and added as a third station carrying the simulcast feed already heard on WBVP and WMBA. The following year, the stations debuted full time on-line audio streaming via the station's website.

=== Merger between WBVP and WMBA ===
In May 2000, WMBA owner Donn Wuycik, president of Donn Communications, entered into an agreement to sell WMBA to Iorio Broadcasting, for an undisclosed amount.

Since 2000, though, they have been under single ownership and WMBA's operations were moved from 761 Merchant Street in Ambridge into WBVP's existing facilities at 1316 Seventh Avenue in Beaver Falls. WBVP and WMBA, which aired separate talk formats with nostalgia and adult contemporary music, respectively, began to duplicate more of each other's programming as time evolved, and today the stations are nearly 100 percent simulcast. The exceptions are usually confined to high school sports, where each station will air live play-by-play of a game significant to its community.

Frank Iorio wanted to concentrate on his new Pittsburgh acquisition, WJAS, a transaction which he would successfully complete in the summer of 2014. Longtime WBVP and WMBA general manager Mark Peterson had aspired to acquire a station of his own, and Iorio arranged to sell the station to Peterson and his wife. Both WBVP and WMBA were sold to Peterson's newly formed company, Sound Ideas Media, LLC for $750,000 in a transaction that was consummated on February 28, 2014.

Previous logo

On September 7, 2021, the stations were acquired by St. Barnabas Broadcasting, a division of the Saint Barnabas Health System, making them sister stations to WJAS.

=== Past personalities ===
WBVP has served as a springboard for on-air personnel who have moved on to bigger stations. Among the WBVP alumni are Bob Alexander, Alan Boal, Jim Reynolds, Chris Shovlin (Beaver County Sports Hall of Fame), Bill Kelly, Sam Nicotero (known as Tony Scott on WBVP), Earl Lewis, Justin McKim, Ken Mueller, Randy Buckwalter, Carl Anderson, Mark Razz (Radziewicz), Gert Trobe, Mike Romigh, George Allen, Owen Simon, Sam Siple, Chuck Wilson (Beaver County Sports Hall of Fame), Don Kennedy (Big Band Jump), Ernie Kline, who later became Pennsylvania's lieutenant governor, Bob Barrickman (Beaver County Sports Hall of Fame) and Tom Hays (Beaver County Sports Hall of Fame).
