= WOKW =

- Curwensville, Pennsylvania; United States
- Broadcast area: Curwensville/Clearfield
- Frequency: 102.9 MHz
- Branding: wOK!w 102.9

Programming
- Format: Adult hits
- Affiliations: ABC News Radio

Ownership
- Owner: Raymark Broadcasting

History
- First air date: August 1, 1989
- Former call signs: WWWS (1988–1989, CP)

Technical information
- Licensing authority: FCC
- Facility ID: 55251
- Class: A
- ERP: 350 watts
- HAAT: 288 meters (945 ft)
- Transmitter coordinates: 41°04′29″N 78°31′58″W

Links
- Public license information: Public file; LMS
- Webcast: Listen Live
- Website: wokw.com

WOKW (102.9 FM) is a commercial radio station licensed to Curwensville, Pennsylvania, serving Clearfield County with an adult hits format. WOKW’s studios are located in Clearfield, while the transmitter resides in Lawrence Township.

== History ==
WOKW signed on the air on August 1, 1989, at 10:29 am. That exact time and day was chosen as they numerically reflected the new station's frequency of 102.9. The station was initially assigned the call letters WWWS, but those were changed shortly before the station went on the air. The station has been owned by Raymark Broadcasting since it first went on the air and had maintained the same adult contemporary format through ABC/SMN/Westwood One until September 30, 2019. On October 1, RayMark Broadcasting severed their 36-year relationship with Westwood One and took control of programming the music. The station now includes over fifty years of popular music, both current and past artists, with rock album cuts, B-sides, and forgotten classics added in after 5 PM and during weekends. WOKW was for much its history the sister station of AM 1160 WCCS, located in Homer City, Pennsylvania. WCCS first went on the air in 1983 under a partnership by two former radio station managers, Ray Goss of Indiana and Mark Harley of Clearfield; "Raymark" is an amalgam of their first names. Both had worked for radio stations in Indiana and State College, respectively, that were under the ownership of Progressive Publishing Company, which also owned radio stations in Clearfield. Goss and Harley, who had worked together for years prior to putting WCCS on the air, pooled their resources together to build WCCS, and continued their partnership until 1988, when Goss decided to pursue other interests. Harley bought out Goss' stake in the company and retained possession of WCCS, and with a desire to put a station on the air closer to his home, successfully applied for a construction permit for an FM station to be built in Curwensville. A broadcast tower was built just outside the Cuzak borough limits, and a studio was built in space shared by a local trucking company on Old Town Road in suburban Clearfield.

In 1991, Harley decided to expand his portfolio to include a third station, which he built in Northern Cambria County. WCCZ (now WPCL) went on the air at 97.3 from studios at PA Routes 219 and 271 in downtown Spangler, now known today as Northern Cambria (through the merger of Barnesboro and Spangler boroughs). Unforeseen circumstances, however, forced Harley to sell WCCZ to WKYN, which made the station a translator to rebroadcast the signal of its Ridgway-based signal to listeners in the Johnstown area. Harley moved WOKW to its permanent location in the late 1990s to a former gas station location he purchased along Clearfield/Curwensville pike near a local shopping center. The building was completely renovated with office space being leased next door and an apartment on the top floor.

In 2002, Harley sold WCCS to Renda Broadcasting Corporation of Pittsburgh, which also purchased WDAD & WQMU in Indiana and Lucky 106.3 from Blarisville. Harley did maintain possession of WOKW and continues to operate the station today. Harley continues today to run WOKW, which is the only standalone FM station in Clearfield County. In 2007, long time Clearfield broadcaster Bob E. Day joined the WOKW staff after 40 years at WCPA/WQYX. Bob hosted his own oldies show "Sunday Super Gold" on Sunday afternoons until his death in October 2018. Veteran broadcaster Bill Otto hosted the "Oldies Kloset" on Saturday mornings beginning in 1990 featuring music from the roots of rock and roll and changed formats to Classic Rock in January 2018 and changed the name of the program to Klassix from the Kloset. Bill Otto now hosts Sunday Super Gold and Dennis Wood has assumed duties as host of Klassix From The Kloset and Back to the 80's.
