= WISR =

Coordinates: 40°52′39″N 79°54′09″W

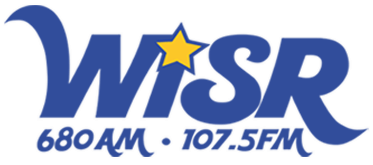
- Butler, Pennsylvania; United States
- Frequency: 680 kHz
- Branding: "The Wizard"

Programming
- Format: News/talk/sports/nostalgia
- Affiliations: Pittsburgh Penguins Radio Network; Pittsburgh Pirates Radio Network; Pittsburgh Steelers Radio Network

Ownership
- Owner: St. Barnabas Broadcasting, Inc.
- Sister stations: WBUT, WLER-FM, WBVP, WMBA, WJAS

History
- First air date: September 26, 1941
- Call sign meaning: Isaac Samuel Rosenblum

Technical information
- Licensing authority: FCC
- Facility ID: 7900
- Class: D
- Power: 250 watts day 50 watts night
- Translator: 107.5 W298CW (Butler)

Links
- Public license information: Public file; LMS
- Webcast: Listen Live
- Website: wisr680.com

WISR (680 AM) is a commercial radio station that is licensed to Butler, Pennsylvania. The station was the first to go on the air in Butler County, doing so on September 26, 1941. The station was the last to be granted a broadcast license before the FCC halted the licensing of any additional stations until after World War II.

It has always broadcast on AM 680 with a maximum power output of 250 Watts, non-directional. WISR had operated as a daytime-only station until it was granted limited nighttime power in the late 1980s.

The station has a construction permit for an FM translator (W298CW) that would allow it to operate at 107.5 MHz. The permit was granted January 25, 2018. The FM translator officially signed on air September 28, 2021, making WISR available on both the AM and FM bands, and was licensed effective October 15, 2021.

After more than two decades of ownership under the Butler County Radio Network, WISR was sold to Pittsburgh Radio Partners on September 2, 2022. After less than two months, St. Barnabas Broadcasting announced that it would acquire WISR and its affiliate stations from Pittsburgh Radio Partners. The purchase was consummated on February 14, 2023, at a price of $2.55 million.

== History ==
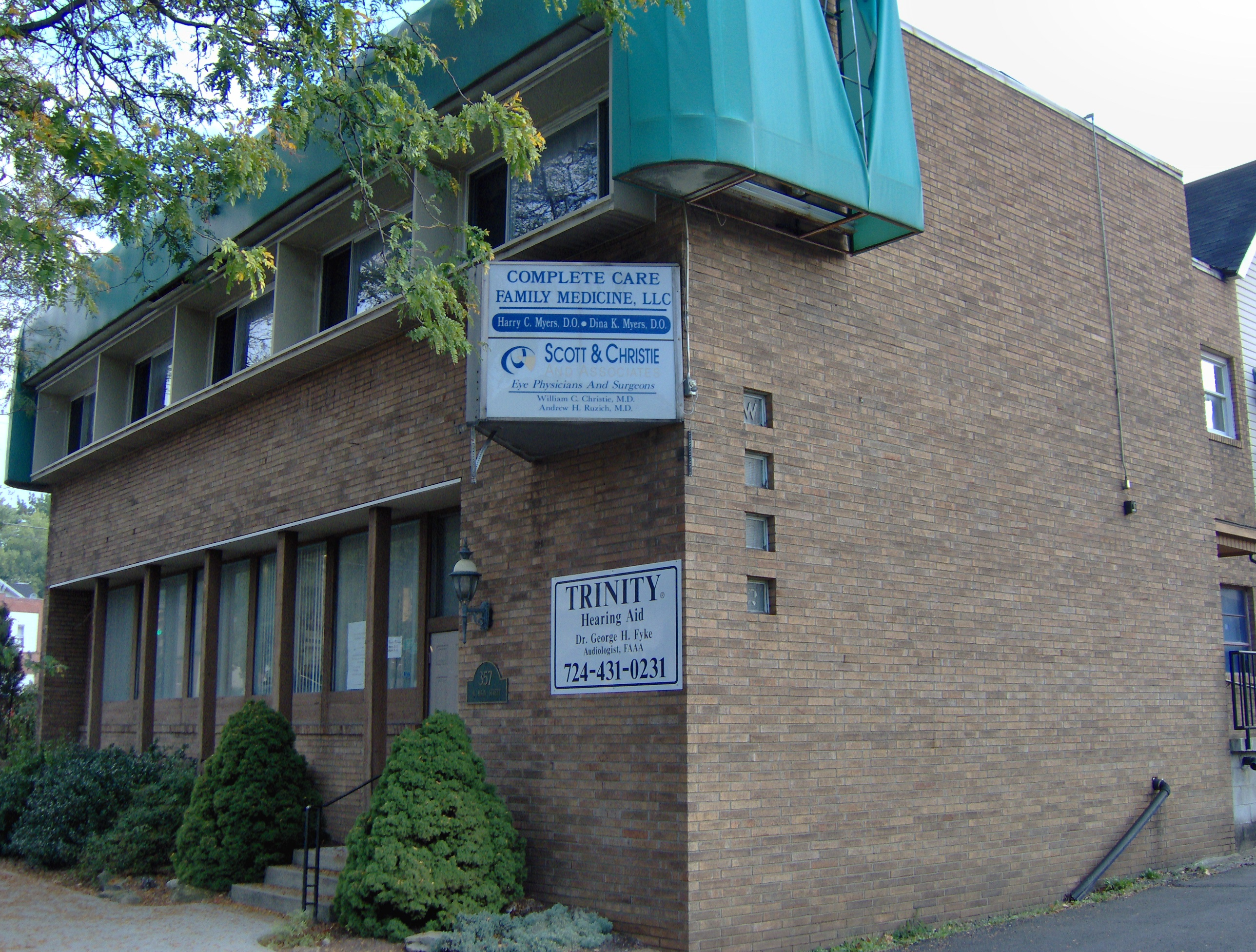
WISR's longtime home at 357 North Main Street in Butler, from 1954 through 2003, preceding its current home at Pullman Commerce Center; note the remaining "W" from the call letters in the four vertical blocks

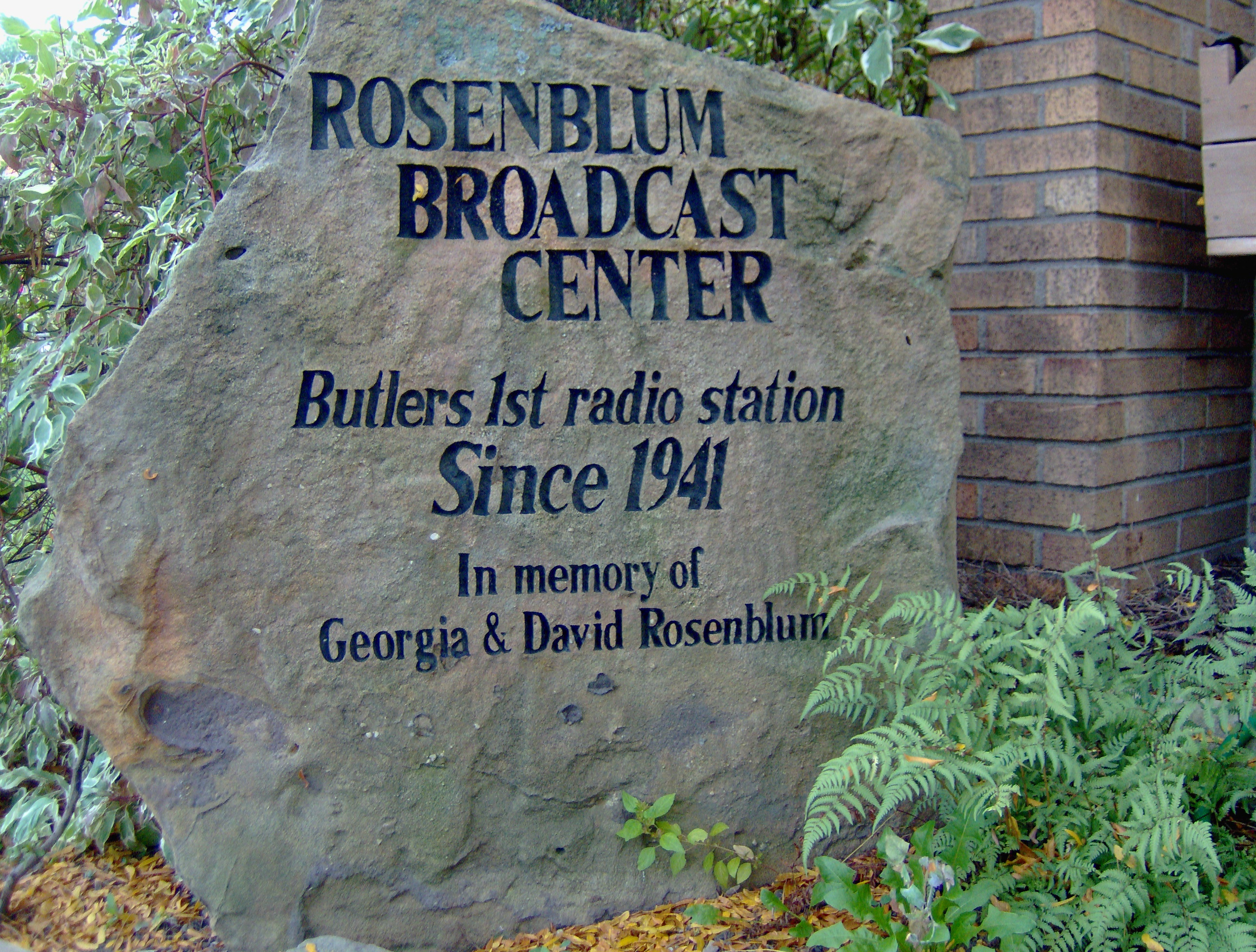
Stone commemorating the Rosenblum founding station ownership, at the front of the building at 357 North Main Street in Butler

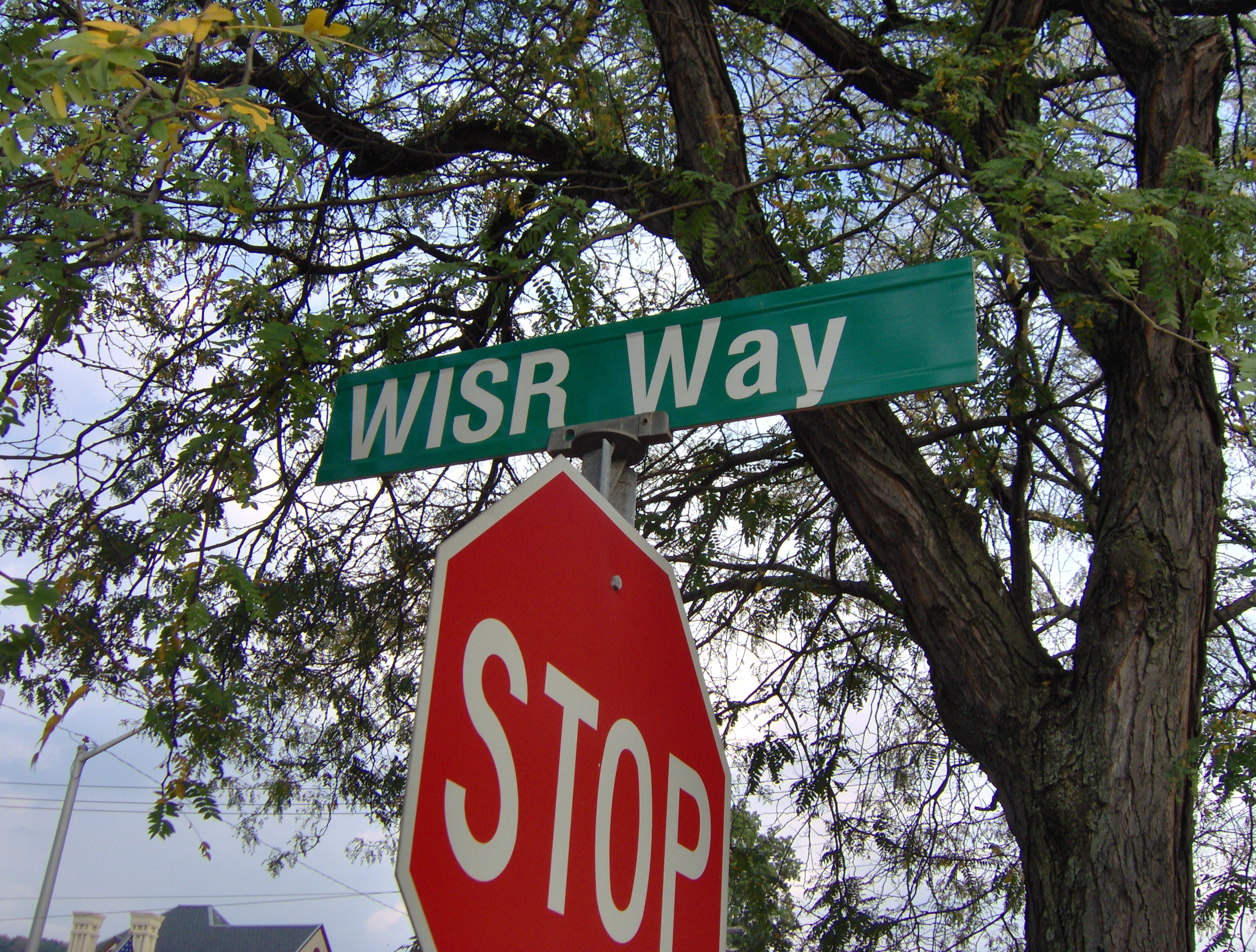
WISR Way, an alley that runs from North Main Street and alongside the former station building for two city blocks

=== First in Butler County: a family affair ===
WISR was the brainchild of local businessman David Rosenblum, who felt that the community could use a local radio station to promote its community and events. Naming the station after his father, Isaac Samuel Rosenblum, David Rosenblum managed the station and sold airtime, with his wife Georgia keeping the books. The couple continued to operate the radio station until their deaths during the early 1950s. It was at that time that the Rosenblums' son Joel, assumed the operations of WISR.

Joel Rosenblum's brother Ray later owned and managed a station of his own some 25 miles to the east, known as AM 1380 WACB (now WKFO) Kittanning.

WISR, like most other small-town stations, offered a mixture of both programs and music. One popular program was a buy-sell-trade program, "The Phone Party," that was hosted by advertising sales representative Guy Travaglio, who left the station in the 1990s to pursue a career in politics. Midday on-air personality Pat Parker took over the show.

Another popular program was "The Larry Berg Show," hosted by another advertising sales rep, Larry Berg, who joined WISR after completing a 14-year tenure as owner of then-competitor present-affiliate stations WBUT and WLER-FM. Berg's show continued until his retirement on February 1, 2001. The show was renamed "It's Your Turn" and today is hosted by morning show host Dave Malarkey.

Most low-powered daytime-only radio stations were granted permission by the FCC to begin limited nighttime power operations in 1988. WISR was one of these stations, and prior to the nighttime authorization, had never used satellite technology on the air, relying on world and national news via UPI wire service. After nighttime power was granted, WISR signed an affiliation agreement with CBS news, introducing satellite technology to its listeners.

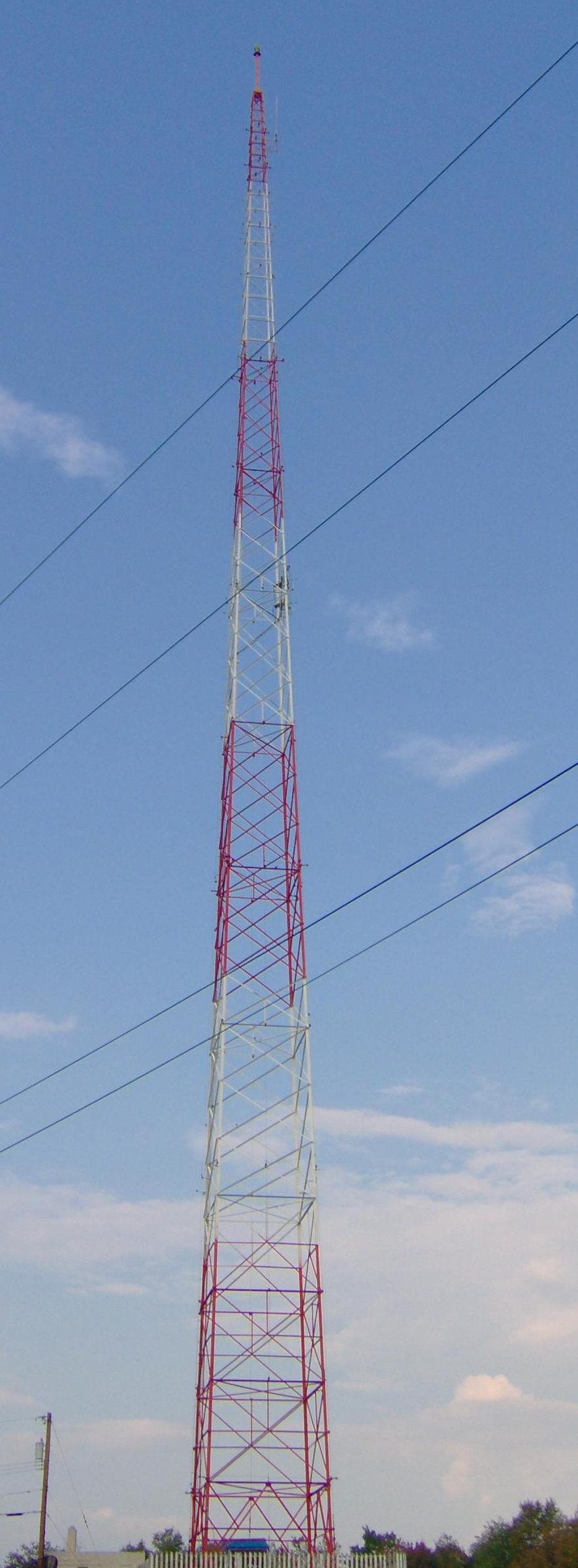
WISR broadcast tower at the end of North Cemetery on Route 8 north in Butler

=== 1997: duopoly sale ===
Joel Rosenblum continued to operate WISR out of its original studio on North Main Street in downtown Butler until 1997, when he agreed to sell the station to Brandon Communications Systems, Incorporated. That company, headed by Robert C. Brandon and his brother Ronald, was the licensee of WISR's crosstown competitor, WBUT and WLER-FM, which first signed on the air in 1949.

Prior to the sale, WISR had programmed a format of both talk and adult contemporary music. In an effort to make the three stations compete less with each other, Brandon Communications switched the format from adult contemporary to one of MOR and easy listening music.

The station, which had progressed very little in terms of technology up to this point, invested in computerized hard-disk audio, provided by DCS.

WLER-FM evolved out of the former FM license that had been issued to WISR. The station had been originally known as WISR-FM until the Rosenblum ownership returned the license to the FCC, failing to make a go with it in these early years of FM. The license was recovered by WBUT's ownership years later.

Larry Berg, the former owner of competitor WBUT-AM-FM from 1964 until 1978, resurfaced at WISR a few years later, where he hosted his own afternoon talk show and sold airtime.

=== Brandon ownership era ends ===
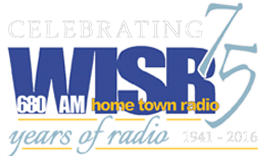
Former logo

Brandon Communications Systems then changed its name to the Butler County Radio Network soon after the acquisition of WISR. A few years later, the Brandon brothers, one by one, sold their interests in the station to another ownership group made up of four local entrepreneurs, but the Butler County Radio Network remained the name of the licensee. In 2003, WISR moved from its longtime location at 357 North Main Street to a new location on Hollywood Drive in Pullman Commerce Center, located on the south edge of Butler just off Route 8 south, sharing space with WBUT and WLER. In late 2013, the trio of radio stations then moved from Pullman Center to its current location on Pillow Street.

== WISR today ==
WISR's current format is a mixture of news, talk, sports, and classic hits music, and continued its affiliation with the CBS radio network until its demise, which it has maintained since being granted nighttime power. It is also Butler County's exclusive radio home to the Pittsburgh Penguins, Pittsburgh Pirates, Pittsburgh Steelers, and Knoch High School sports. Longtime personalities Dave Malarkey and Pat Parker have each been with WISR for many years, with Malarkey first joining the station in 1973, and Parker in 1987.
