= WWGR =

Coordinates: 26.423°N 81.630°W

- Fort Myers, Florida; United States
- Broadcast area: Southwest Florida
- Frequency: 101.9 MHz (HD Radio)
- Branding: Gator Country 101.9

Programming
- Format: Country music
- Affiliations: Compass Media Networks

Ownership
- Owner: Renda Media; (Renda Broadcasting Corporation of Nevada)
- Sister stations: WJGO, WGUF, WSGL

History
- First air date: December 2, 1969
- Call sign meaning: Gator (short for alligator)

Technical information
- Licensing authority: FCC
- Facility ID: 56985
- Class: C0
- ERP: 100,000 watts
- HAAT: 341 meters (1,119 ft)

Links
- Public license information: Public file; LMS
- Webcast: Listen live
- Website: gatorcountry1019.com

WWGR (101.9 FM, "Gator Country 101.9") is a commercial radio station licensed to Fort Myers, Florida, United States. It airs a country music format and is owned by Renda Media, with studios on Race Track Road in Bonita Springs.

WWGR's transmitter is off Corkscrew Road in Estero. It can be heard from Port Charlotte to The Everglades.

== History ==
The station signed on the air on December 2, 1969. Its original call sign was WHEW and it was the sister station to WMYR 1410 AM. The two stations were owned by Robert Heckshur, who served as the president, general manager and chief engineer. While WMYR played Top 40 hits, WHEW was always a country music station. In its early years, it was only on an antenna at a height of 175 feet (53 m). That limited its coverage area. By the 1980s, it was getting increased competition from country music rival WCKT. That meant it had to battle for listeners and advertisers.

In 1994, the station was bought by Renda Broadcasting for $4 million. Following its sale, it took the name "Gator Country 101.9." (Gator is a shortened form of the word "alligator," an animal common in South Florida swamps.) The station changed its call letters to WWGR and began using the slogan "Southwest Florida's Country Station".

In April 2013, two air personalities on WWGR told listeners that dihydrogen monoxide, a scientific description of water, was coming out of their water taps, as part of an April Fool's Day hoax. This caused some alarm and the two were suspended for a few days. The station's general manager, Tony Renda made the decision. Renda later told The Fort Myers News-Press: "It is one thing when radio stations change their format or other crazy things they do. But you are messing with one of the big three, food, water or shelter. They just went too far; I just knew I didn't like that." The prank resulted in several calls by consumers to the local utility company, which sent out a release stating that the water was safe.

In 2005, WWGR moved its studios from Fort Myers to Bonita Springs, just across the street from the Naples-Fort Myers Greyhound Track. The building houses WWGR and sister stations WSGL, WJGO, and WGUF.
