= WDAD =

- Indiana, Pennsylvania; United States
- Frequency: 1450 kHz
- Branding: WDAD AM1450 and 100.3FM

Programming
- Language: English
- Format: Classic hits
- Affiliations: Premiere Networks; Pittsburgh Steelers Audio Network

Ownership
- Owner: Renda Media; (Renda Broadcasting Corporation)
- Sister stations: WCCS; WLCY; WQMU

History
- First air date: November 4, 1945

Technical information
- Licensing authority: FCC
- Facility ID: 56645
- Class: C
- Power: 1,000 watts unlimited
- Transmitter coordinates: 40°38′17″N 79°08′47″W
- Translator: 100.3 W262CU (Indiana)

Links
- Public license information: Public file; LMS
- Webcast: Listen live
- Website: www.wdadradio.com

WDAD (1450 AM) is a radio station in Indiana County, Pennsylvania, owned and operated by Renda Media.

== History ==
WDAD was the first radio station in Indiana County, and was one of the first radio stations in the nation granted licenses after World War II had ended. The station has kept its original call letters throughout its history of more than half a century.

WDAD's ownership was relatively stable, having only had four owners in its long history. The station was signed on November 4, 1945, under the corporate name Indiana Broadcasters, Inc. Paul Short served as company president and general manager. The station's studios and offices were housed in the Indiana Theatre Building at 633 Philadelphia Street. The company also operated WARD-AM in nearby Johnstown under the name Central Broadcasting Company, Inc. The station operated at a full-time power of 250 watts from its transmitter site along Old Highway 422 and Twolick Road in neighboring White Township, Pennsylvania.

Progressive Publishing of Clearfield, Pennsylvania, purchased the station in August 1955 but continued to operate WDAD (and later its FM sister station WQMU) under the existing company name Indiana Broadcasters. Progressive also owned two other radio stations, WCPA/WQYX-FM in Clearfield, and WMAJ/WXLR-FM in State College.

Under Progressive's ownership of more than three decades, WDAD prospered greatly, beginning with a facility upgrade in 1964, which allowed it to increase its daytime power from 250 watts to 1,000 watts. A co-located FM station, WQMU, signed on the air in 1968.

WDAD enjoyed a long history of success in its hometown, despite two aggressive competitors, WCCS in Homer City, and WLCY-FM in Blairsville, south of Indiana, both of which came on the air in the early 1980s. Coincidentally, WCCS co-founder Ray Goss had served as general manager for WDAD and WQMU for 15 years before leaving to start WCCS in 1981.

In 1984, WDAD and sister station WQMU moved from its studios and offices along Oakland Avenue near the campus of Indiana University of Pennsylvania to a spacious new facility at 21 North Fifth Street. That same year, WDAD was granted permission to increase its nighttime power to 1,000 watts, which happened the following year after its transmitter facility was moved from its original Old Route 422 location to 364 Elkin Avenue, in the Chevy Chase Heights section of White Township.

Progressive Publishing decided to sell WDAD in 1989 to RMS Media Management, Incorporated; a company headed by its then-general manager, Richard M. Sherry, who had been with the stations since 1967.

Both competitors WCCS and WLCY, which had been separately owned, began to pair up in June 2002 when Anthony F. Renda, by then the President of Renda Broadcasting Corporation, entered into a local marketing agreement with Longo Media Group that led to the eventual purchase of WLCY-FM. Renda purchased WCCS outright two months later.

Renda, who had begun his broadcasting career at WDAD as a teenager, also had plans to purchase WDAD and WQMU from RMS Media. RMS Media agreed in 2004 to sell WDAD and WQMU to Renda Broadcasting, doing business as St. Pier Group for $3.25 million.

In 2003, Renda Broadcasting acquired the former Gatti Pharmacy building at the corner of 9th and Philadelphia Streets in downtown Indiana, where the four stations and its business operations occupy the first and second floors.

== Translator ==
Broadcast translator for WDAD
Call sign	Frequency	City of license	FID	ERP (W)	HAAT	Class	Transmitter coordinates	FCC info
W262CU	100.3 FM	Indiana, Pennsylvania	139435	250	103 m (338 ft)	D	40°38′16″N 79°08′49″W	LMS
