= Central Pennsylvania Christian Institute =

The Central Pennsylvania Christian Institute (CPCI) is a non-denominational, non-profit Christian organization based in Pennsylvania, US.

The organization was established in 1977 and oversees the ministries of Way Truth Life Radio, Camp Kanesatake, Puppets With a Purpose, and the Ezekiel Forum.

== Ministries ==
=== Way Truth Life Radio ===
Way Truth Life Radio is a non-commercial, listener-supported radio broadcasting from two stations in central Pennsylvania. WTLR, 89.9 FM has served Pennsylvania since 1978.

WQJU, 107.1 FM became CPCI's second full-power radio station in January 1993 and covers Mifflin, Snyder, Juniata, and Perry counties.

=== Camp Kanesatake ===
Camp Kanesatake was opened in 1923 by the Pennsylvania Sabbath School Association. In 1989, it was incorporated into CPCI's ministries in response to the board of directors recognizing the demand for Christian camping in central Pennsylvania. It offers summer camps for schoolchildren and retreats for adults.

=== Puppets With a Purpose ===
Puppets With a Purpose (PWAP) is a Christian-based youth ministry whose purpose is to share the Gospel of Jesus Christ with fellow Christians and non-Christians alike through the use of puppets. PAWP was established in 1993 and produces short stories mixed with music told by a team of puppeteers and assistants. In 2005 the team traveled to Peru to form a group of Christian puppeteers to minister to the local population.

=== Ezekiel Forum ===
The Ezekiel Forum is an annual conference of Christian speakers. Recent events have included Dr. Peter Jones speaking on the book Da Vinci Code and financial teaching from the Biblical Stewardship Series.

== Governance ==
CPCI is governed by an uncompensated board of directors made up of Christian laymen from various denominations.

== Registrations and memberships ==
CPCI is registered as a not-for-profit corporation by the Commonwealth of Pennsylvania and recognized by the Internal Revenue Service as a 501(c)(3) organization. It is a member of the Christian Stewardship Association.
