= WMBA =

Radio station in Ambridge, Pennsylvania

Coordinates: 40°44′16″N 80°17′47″W

- Ambridge, Pennsylvania; United States
- Broadcast area: Beaver County
- Frequency: 1460 kHz
- Branding: 95.7 The Beaver

Programming
- Format: Country–rock hybrid

Ownership
- Owner: St. Barnabas Broadcasting, Inc.
- Sister stations: WJAS, WBUT, WLER-FM, WISR, WBVP

History
- First air date: 1956
- Call sign meaning: Miners Broadcasting

Technical information
- Licensing authority: FCC
- Facility ID: 17266
- Class: B
- Power: 110 watts day 120 watts night
- Translator: 95.7 W239CR (Ambridge)

Links
- Public license information: Public file; LMS
- Webcast: Listen Live
- Website: beavercountyradio.com

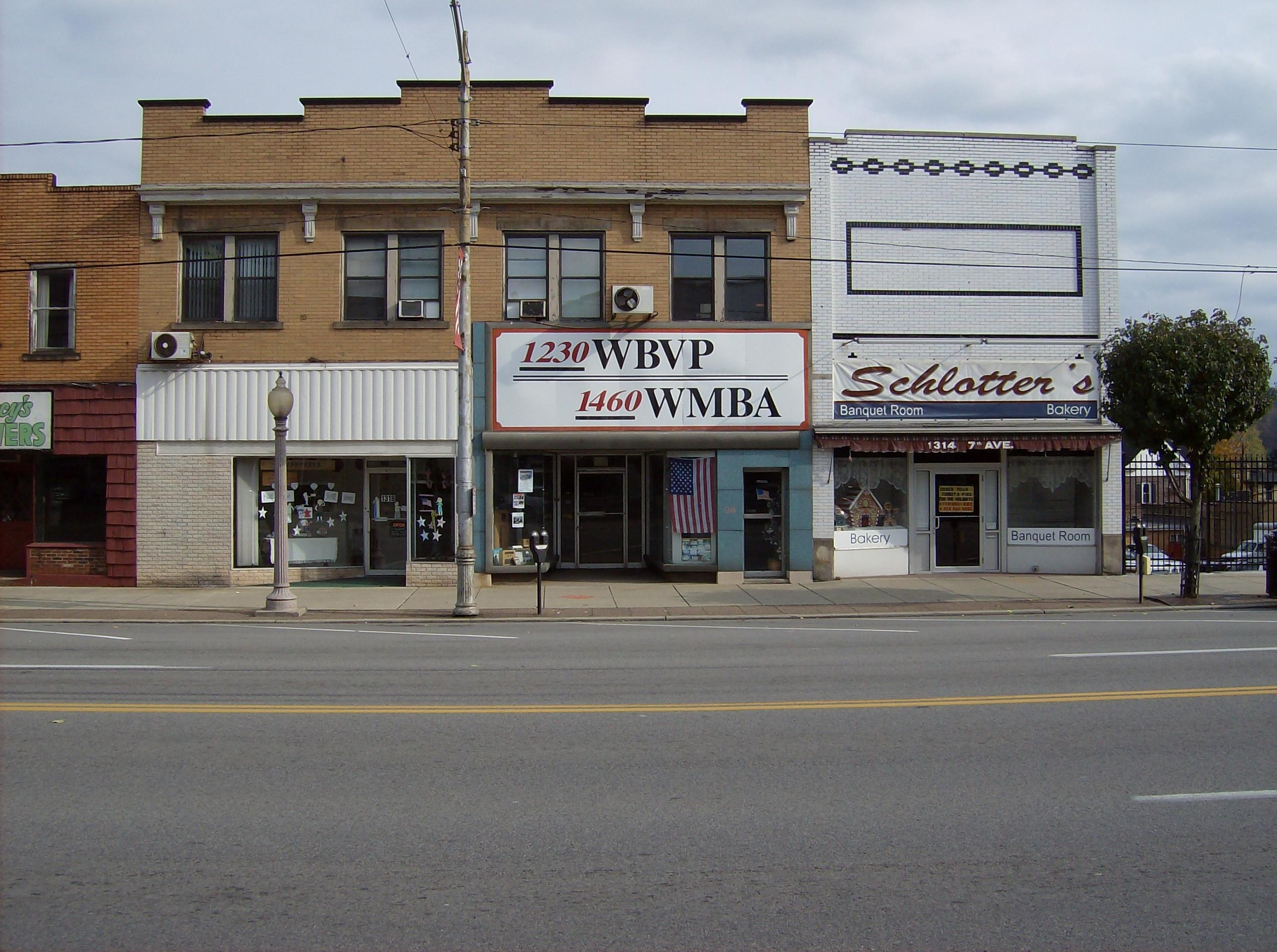
WBVP/WMBA headquarters

WMBA (1460 AM) is a commercial radio station based in Beaver County, Pennsylvania. It used to simulcast a news/talk radio format with WBVP. On September 16, 2023, WMBA switched to a country-rock hybrid called The Beaver. The station is owned by St. Barnabas Broadcasting, Inc., a division of the Saint Barnabas Health System. The studios and offices are on Seventh Avenue in Beaver Falls, Pennsylvania.

WMBA transmits with 110 watts during the daytime and 120 watts during the nighttime, using a non-direction antenna, and is licensed to Ambridge, Pennsylvania.

== Programming ==
The station currently airs a country/rock hybrid format as the Beaver.

== History ==
WMBA station signed on the air in 1957. Miners Broadcasting Service, Inc., headquartered in Pottsville, Pennsylvania, put WMBA on the air as a 500-watt daytimer with its towers located in Bell Acres, Pennsylvania and studio in Ambridge, Pennsylvania.

The station was sold in 1970 to John Bride, a former Pittsburgh television advertising salesman. His Bride Broadcasting, Inc. instituted a more contemporary format, including local talk shows and Top 40 music after 4 p.m. during the week and on weekends. Bride continued to own and operate the station even after he moved his base of operations to Maine, where he owned other radio stations. Bride finally sold the station to Donn Communications in 1986 and the studios and offices moved from a converted house at 291 14th Street in Ambridge to a storefront at 761 Merchant Street in Ambridge's business district. In 1988, FCC approval was granted and new towers were constructed at the transmitter site to allow for WMBA to broadcast 24 around the clock, using a directional antenna.

In 1960, WBVP was joined by a 16,500-watt FM sister station at 106.7 MHz, that was first known as WBVP-FM. The station underwent a huge transformation in 1975. It gained approval from the FCC to increase power to 47,000 watts and broadcast from a much taller, newly constructed, 517-foot guyed tower in Pulaski Township, Pennsylvania. It switched its call letters to WWKS, and becoming best known throughout the 1970s and ’80s as "Kiss FM".

In 1994, WWKS flipped to a hard rock format and became branded as "The Force". When the FCC relaxed its station ownership rules in the mid-1990s, the successful FM station became an attractive acquisition for another radio group operating stations in Pittsburgh. That led to WWKS being separated from WBVP in 1995, when Pittsburgh Radio Partners sold the asset to Secret Communications, eventually becoming part of Clear Channel Communications. After a couple more transactions, call letters and format changes through the years, today it is operated by St. John's Mission as Pittsburgh station WAOB-FM.

Following the 1995 sale of WWKS, WBVP was sold in a spin-off transaction to Frank Iorio, Jr, and his company Iorio Broadcasting, Inc. Iorio, Jr. was one of the partners involved with Pittsburgh Radio Partners. For the next 24 years, there would be no F.M. broadcasting at the stations' headquarters in Beaver Falls. That changed in August 2019, when a translator station for WBVP, (W257EA) at 99.3 F.M., was added to the mix. The new F.M. allocation broadcasts at a height of 492' mounted to same Pulaski Township tower. Both radio stations continue to simulcast a wide variety of local news, sports and talk programming.

=== Merger between WBVP and WMBA ===
In May 2000, WMBA owner Donn Wuycik, president of Donn Communications, entered into an agreement to sell WMBA to Iorio Broadcasting, for an undisclosed amount.

Since 2000, though, they have been under single ownership and WMBA's operations were moved from 761 Merchant Street in Ambridge into WBVP's existing facilities at 1316 Seventh Avenue in Beaver Falls. WBVP and WMBA, which aired separate talk formats with nostalgia and adult contemporary music, respectively, began to duplicate more of each other's programming as time evolved, and today the stations are nearly 100 percent simulcast. The exceptions are usually confined to high school sports, where each station will air live play-by-play of a game significant to its community.

Frank Iorio wanted to concentrate on his new Pittsburgh acquisition, WJAS, a transaction which he would successfully complete in the summer of 2014. Longtime WBVP and WMBA general manager Mark Peterson had aspired to acquire a station of his own, and Iorio arranged to sell the station to Peterson and his wife. Both WBVP and WMBA were sold to Peterson's newly formed company, Sound Ideas Media, LLC for $750,000 in a transaction that was consummated on February 28, 2014.

Previous logo

On September 7, 2021, the stations were acquired by St. Barnabas Broadcasting, a division of the Saint Barnabas Health System, making them sister stations to WJAS.

=== Past personalities ===
WMBA has served as a springboard for on-air personnel who have moved on to bigger stations. Among those who served at WMBA are Bob Pompeani (Beaver County Sports Hall of Fame), Jim Merkel, Guy Junker, Ted Ruscitti (who owned WBVP during the 80's), Jim Ladd, Kevin Maguire, Ray Fallen, Woody Lester, Dave Stevens (Posmoga), Rick Pantale (Pantaleo), Dave Justice (Benard), T.J. Jamison (Jim Green), Dave Denniston, Roy Angst, Frank Greenlee, John Poister, Tim Herrera, Rick Bergman, Al McDowell, Julie Bologna, Randy Cosgrove, Don Shields, Debbie Smith (Debbie Kwei), Dan Dunlap, Gene Romano and John Mehno. Other notable WMBA staffers include Rob Matzie, who in 2008, was elected as a State Representative in Pennsylvania's 16th District.
