= WJAS =

- Pittsburgh, Pennsylvania; United States
- Broadcast area: Pittsburgh metropolitan area
- Frequency: 1320 kHz
- Branding: Talk Radio 1320 and 99.1 WJAS

Programming
- Format: Talk radio
- Affiliations: Fox News Radio; Premiere Networks; Red Apple Media; Westwood One

Ownership
- Owner: St. Barnabas Broadcasting, Inc.
- Sister stations: WBUT; WBVP; WISR; WLER-FM; WMBA

History
- First air date: August 4, 1922
- Former call signs: WJAS (1922–1957); WAMP (1957–1960); WJAS (1960–1973); WKPQ (1973); WKTQ (1973–1981)

Technical information
- Licensing authority: FCC
- Facility ID: 55705
- Class: B
- Power: 7,000 watts (day); 3,300 watts (night)
- Transmitter coordinates: 40°28′46″N 79°54′12″W
- Translator: 99.1 W256DE (Pittsburgh)

Links
- Public license information: Public file; LMS
- Webcast: Listen live
- Website: 1320wjas.com

WJAS (1320 AM) is a commercial radio station in Pittsburgh, Pennsylvania, with a talk radio format. It is owned by St. Barnabas Broadcasting, a division of the Saint Barnabas Health System, with studios and offices on Fleet Street in Green Tree.

The station's transmitter site is off Highland Drive in the Lincoln–Lemington–Belmar neighborhood of Pittsburgh. WJAS broadcasts with 7,000 watts non-directional by day. At night, to avoid interfering with other stations on 1320 AM, it reduces power to 3,300 watts and uses a directional antenna. Programming is also heard on 99-watt FM translator W236DE at 99.1 MHz.

== Programming ==
Weekdays begin with The GD Morning Show, a Pittsburgh-based news and interview program hosted by Greg Maxwell (G) and Darryl Grandy (D). The rest of the weekday schedule is nationally syndicated shows: The Glenn Beck Radio Program, Fox Across America with Jimmy Failla, The Sean Hannity Show, The Mark Levin Show, Coast to Coast AM with George Noory and America in the Morning.

Weekends feature specialty shows on money, health, cars and the law. Syndicated weekend programs include The Ben Ferguson Show, Bill Handel on the Law, Sunday Nights with Bill Cunningham, The Vince Show with Vince Coglianese, The Cats Roundtable with John Catsimatidis and Somewhere in Time with Art Bell. Most hours begin with an update from Fox News Radio.

== History ==
=== Early years ===
Effective December 1, 1921, the U.S. Department of Commerce, which regulated radio in its early days, adopted regulations formally defining "broadcasting stations". The wavelength of 360 meters (833 kHz) was designated for entertainment broadcasts, while 485 meters (619 kHz) was reserved for broadcasting official weather and other government reports. Because there was only one available "entertainment" wavelength, stations in a given region had to develop timesharing agreements, to assign exclusive timeslots for broadcasting on 360 meters.

WJAS was first licensed on August 4, 1922, to the Pittsburgh Radio Supply House, operating on 360 meters. It was Pittsburgh's sixth AM broadcasting station authorization. (Note: The first five Pittsburgh broadcasting stations were: KDKA, Westinghouse Electric & Mfg Co, November 7, 1921; KQV, Doubleday-Hill Electric Company, January 9, 1922; WPB, Newspaper Printing Company, January 10, 1922, to May 5, 1922; WCAE, Kaufman & Baer Company, May 3, 1922; and WHAF, Radio Electric Company, June 30, 1922, to February 20, 1923.) The call letters were randomly assigned from a sequential roster of available call signs.

WJAS was an NBC Red Network affiliate, carrying its dramas, comedies, news and sports during the last years of the Golden Age of Radio. During the 1930s and 1940s, WJAS was home to the Wilkens Amateur Hour. Sponsored by Wilkens Jewelry Company, a 1942 review in the trade publication Billboard said the show "remains Pittsburgh's most popular local program".

On November 1, 1957, the National Broadcasting Company (NBC) gained control of WJAS and WJAS-FM, adding them to the network's roster of its owned-and-operated stations. Later that month, the call letters were changed to WAMP and WFMP, which was derived from "AM and FM Pittsburgh". Three years later, both stations changed back to their original call letters.

=== Top 40 era ===
In 1973, the station became popular with Pittsburgh's young people as Top 40 WKPQ, later WKTQ. It used the branding "13Q", under new owners Heftel Communications. A promotion was run where listeners would win prizes if they were randomly telephoned and answered with "I listen to the new sound of 13Q" (instead of "hello"). The Top 40 years were the highest-rated ever for the station, ranking second in the Arbitron ratings behind only 1020 KDKA.

As young listeners moved to the FM dial for music, the WKTQ's ratings began to fade. In 1977, Heftel sold the station to Nationwide Communications, which tried an adult contemporary music format, which was also unsuccessful.

=== Adult standards ===
Nationwide sold the station to Beni Broadcasting. It switched the station to an adult standards format and brought back the WJAS call letters in 1981. Beni eventually sold WJAS to Renda Broadcasting. WJAS was one of the top standards stations in the United States. The format of Frank Sinatra, Nat King Cole and Barbra Streisand continued for three decades.

Two WJAS personalities with long and storied histories in Pittsburgh media were Jack Bogut and Bill "Chilly Billy" Cardille.

In August 2014, Renda Broadcasting sold WJAS to Pittsburgh Radio Partners LLC, a company controlled by Frank Iorio, Jr. The sale, at a price of $1 million, was consummated on August 1, 2014. It was Iorio's first radio station purchase in Pittsburgh, as his other stations were all based in Warren. Iorio put the Warren stations up for sale in 2017, finding a buyer in Lilly Broadcasting in 2019.

=== Talk radio ===
At noon on August 7, 2014, the new owner decided to change the station's format. It flipped to conservative talk in response to rumors that 104.7 WPGB would flip formats from talk to country music. The final song played under the standards format was "One More for the Road" by Frank Sinatra.

WJAS then began carrying most of the programs previously heard on 104.7 WPGB. (That station directed its listeners to tune to WJAS to hear their favorite talk shows.) The first program to air on the talk-formatted WJAS was The Rush Limbaugh Show. WJAS did not choose to carry WPGB's signature morning drive time program "Quinn and Rose", which returned to the Pittsburgh radio market on 970 WBGG in 2018. In March 2021, after Limbaugh's death, rather than carrying its successor The Clay Travis and Buck Sexton Show, the station hired Rose Somma-Tennent. Former Pittsburgh TV news anchor Wendy Bell hosted from 9 a.m. to noon from January to May 2021, before an unresolved and unspecified "personnel matter" prompted the ownership to cancel Bell's show. Somma-Tennent was unexpectedly fired from the station in late June, replaced by the syndicated Dan Bongino show.

In November 2020, Iorio exited radio and sold WJAS and translator W256DE at 99.1 FM to St. Barnabas Health System. The price tag was $2.05 million. The sale was consummated on January 13, 2021.
