= WPCL =

Coordinates: 40.508°N 78.804°W

- Northern Cambria, Pennsylvania, United States; United States
- Broadcast area: Johnstown, Pennsylvania, United States
- Frequency: 97.3 MHz

Programming
- Format: Religious

Ownership
- Owner: Central Pennsylvania Christian Institute, Inc.

History
- First air date: September 30, 1991 (as WCCZ)
- Former call signs: WCCZ, WXVE
- Call sign meaning: We Proclaim Christ Lives

Technical information
- Licensing authority: FCC
- Class: A
- ERP: 3,000 Watts

Links
- Public license information: Public file; LMS
- Webcast: https://www.hesalive.net

WPCL is a religious-formatted radio station located in Northern Cambria, Pennsylvania, United States. The station broadcasts programming from the He's Alive network on 97.3 FM.

== History ==
=== Beginnings as WCCZ-FM ===
WPCL first signed on the air on September 30, 1991 as WCCZ-FM, licensed to Spangler, which is known today as the Borough of Northern Cambria. The station was the third and final of a group of stations founded by Raymark Broadcasting, a company owned by Ray Goss of Indiana, and Mark Harley, of Clearfield. Raymark had started their company with two other radio stations that they had built prior to this one: WCCS-AM in Homer City and WOKW-FM in Curwensville. Harley had purchased Goss' stake in the company by this time, as Goss wished to pursue other interests.

WCCZ operated on the same principle as its two sister operations...a small programming staff to handle local on-air duties, while relying on a satellite-delivered format to provide music and DJs, enabling its service area to have the benefits of a full-service radio station without the expense of on-site disc jockeys. Though WCCS and WOKW used ABC/SMN's "Starstation" adult contemporary format for their own programming, Raymark chose to affiliate with "Goldies", the oldies format provided by the Jones Radio Network, along with AP world and national news. New studios and offices were constructed in a small storefront in downtown Spangler, at the intersection of PA Routes 219 and 271. In keeping with the network branding, the station became known as "Goldies 97.3".

=== First sale ===
However, the station did not achieve the level of success expected by Raymark. The station was put up for sale and was sold for $167,000 in the spring of 1993 to WKYN, Inc., which owned Adult CHR-formatted WKYN-FM (now WDDH) northwest of Spangler in Ridgway, the seat of government for Elk County. WKYN, which operated at the adjacent frequency of 97.5, changed the call letters of WCCZ to WXVE and took on the similar call letters of WKVE to replace WKYN, using WXVE as a translator to bring 97.5's signal closer to the more populous city of Johnstown.

=== Second sale ===
WKYN, Inc. was then sold to Cam Communications in 1995, as owner Bob Stevens wished to pursue radio station ownership opportunities in his hometown near Pittsburgh. WXVE was then sold to He's Alive, which operated the station as a network translator for its group of low-powered Christian-formatted radio stations, changing the call letters to WPCL. Unlike many of He's Alive's properties, this one is on the commercial band and is a full-powered Class A property.

=== WPCL today ===
In December 2013, He's Alive sold WPCL to Central Pennsylvania Christian Institute, Inc. for $200,000. The sale was consummated on January 24, 2014.
