= WSHH =

Adult contemporary radio station in Pittsburgh

Coordinates: 40.4634°N 80.0042°W

- Pittsburgh, Pennsylvania; United States
- Broadcast area: Greater Pittsburgh
- Frequency: 99.7 MHz
- Branding: Wish 99.7

Programming
- Format: Adult contemporary
- Affiliations: Compass Media Networks; Premiere Networks; WPXI

Ownership
- Owner: Renda Media; (Renda Broadcasting Corporation of Nevada)
- Sister stations: WHJB

History
- First air date: March 8, 1948
- Former call signs: WJAS-FM (1948–1957); WFMP (1957–1960); WJAS-FM (1960–1973)
- Call sign meaning: disambiguation of the word "Wish"

Technical information
- Licensing authority: FCC
- Facility ID: 55709
- Class: B
- ERP: 17,000 watts
- HAAT: 260 meters (850 ft)

Links
- Public license information: Public file; LMS
- Webcast: Listen live
- Website: wishpittsburgh.com

WSHH (99.7 FM) is a commercial radio station in Pittsburgh, Pennsylvania. It is the flagship of Renda Media and airs an adult contemporary radio format. WSHH is Pittsburgh's affiliate of the syndicated Delilah show, which airs every night. Between Mid-November and December 25 each year, WSHH airs a Christmas music format.

The station's transmitter is co-located with WPXI on Rising Main Avenue in Pittsburgh near Interstate 279. Its studios and offices located on Parish Street.

== History ==
=== WJAS-FM ===
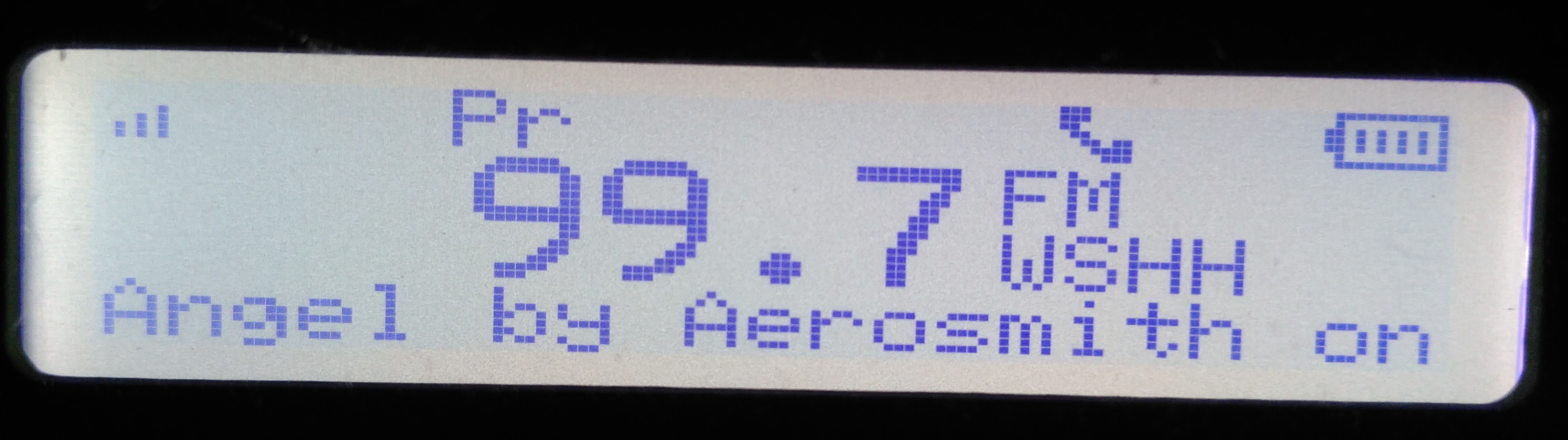
WSHH on a SPARC HD Radio with RDS.

On March 8, 1948, the station first signed on as WJAS-FM. It was the FM counterpart to WJAS, owned by the Pittsburgh Radio Supply House.

The two stations simulcast and were network affiliates of CBS Radio, airing its dramas, comedies, news, sports, soap operas, game shows and big band broadcasts during the "Golden Age of Radio". As network programming moved from radio to television in the 1950s, WJAS-AM-FM carried a full service, middle of the road format of music, talk, news and sports.

On November 1, 1957, the National Broadcasting Company (NBC) gained control of WJAS and WJAS-FM, adding them to their roster of network owned-and-operated stations. Later that month the call letters were changed to WAMP and WFMP, which was derived from "AM and FM Pittsburgh". Three years later, both stations changed back to their original call letters.

=== Beautiful music WSHH ===
In the late 1960s, WJAS-FM ended its simulcast and began playing beautiful music, which continued into the 1970s and 1980s. In 1973, WJAS-AM-FM were sold to Heftel Broadcasting. Heftel made some significant changes: WJAS switched to a talk format with the call sign WKTQ, while WJAS-FM became WSHH, using the moniker "Wish 100."

During the 1970s, beautiful music was well represented on Pittsburgh radio: WKJF, which later became WJOI, was the leader for many years, and KDKA-FM aired automated beautiful music during the day and classical music at night. (It became WPNT in 1979 with beautiful music (no more classical) and live announcers.) Despite the competition, by the late 1970s, WSHH was Pittsburgh's number two station behind KDKA. WSHH's ratings were helped by a full staff of live announcers, to add some personality and information, in addition to the instrumental music sweeps.

=== Nationwide acquisition ===
Nationwide Communications, a division of Nationwide Insurance, bought WKTQ and WSHH in 1975. In 1982, Nationwide fired most of the WSHH staff, replacing them with an automated "live assist" format, to cut expenses. John Ford was the last live announcer before the switch.

During Wish's halcyon years, the station had only two announcers for the 24-hour broadcast day - program director and morning announcer Joe Fenn and afternoon announcer Tom Malloy. Both men would work a live four-hour on-air shift, but their pre-recorded voices would be heard for another eight hours each day.

=== Renda ownership ===
Wish was sold in October 1983 to its current owner, Renda Broadcasting Corporation. It was the first major market FM acquisition for company president Anthony F. Renda, who had also owned WIXZ (now WGBN) in suburban McKeesport during the 1970s. (Renda bought that station back in 1997.) Renda also acquired WPXZ and WECZ in Punxsutawney three years prior to the acquisition of Wish 100.

While the ratings for WSHH remained high, its audience was aging, while advertisers usually prefer younger listeners. The groundwork for a format change began in 1988, when Renda lured legendary Pittsburgh DJ Jack Bogut away from WTAE to do mornings.

=== Switch to adult contemporary ===
In 1989, Renda Broadcasting decided to challenge former easy listening WLTJ's position as Pittsburgh's soft adult contemporary at-work station by changing WSHH itself to Soft AC, on December 26, 1989. The switch worked with WSHH becoming the Soft AC leader. Bogut remained a fixture in the morning with Dan Dunlap in the midday, Stephen Granato in afternoon drive and Dyan Sheridyn in the evening.

In 1997, WSHH moved from its longtime home on Crane Avenue in Green Tree to Parrish Street, just off Greentree Road and approximately a mile from the Crane Avenue building. This new building houses WSHH's studios and offices, as well as the corporate offices for Renda Broadcasting.

In 2009, WSHH saw its AC rival WLTJ move to a younger direction as a Hot AC station. By 2012, WSHH became Pittsburgh's last remaining AC, when suburban AC station WLER-FM in Butler, flipped to mainstream rock.

== Christmas music ==
During the Christmas season, WSHH plays holiday-themed music, beginning in mid-November. WSHH, like many other Christmas music stations, returns to regular programming on December 26. In recent years, WSHH has aired a Christmas Preview Weekend, which is a full Christmas music format for the weekend only, in the weekends leading up to Thanksgiving. This Christmas music format competes with Classic Hits-formatted WWSW-FM, owned by iHeartMedia. In 2024, WSHH continued the Christmas music through the weekend after Christmas instead of ending on December 26.
