= WLTJ =

Hot Adult Contemporary radio station in Pittsburgh, Pennsylvania

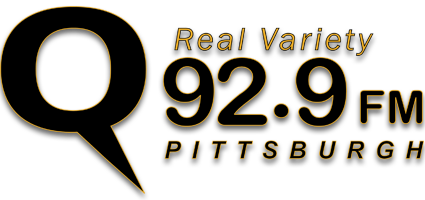
- Pittsburgh, Pennsylvania; United States
- Broadcast area: Pittsburgh metropolitan area
- Frequency: 92.9 MHz (HD Radio)
- Branding: Q92.9

Programming
- Format: Hot Adult Contemporary
- Subchannels: HD2: Spanish variety "Radio Las Palmas"; HD3: Classic rock "Classic Rock 92"; HD4: Classic alternative "Y2K Radio"

Ownership
- Owner: The Frischling Family; (WPNT Media Subsidiary, LLC - Steel City Media)
- Sister stations: WRRK

History
- First air date: April 4, 1942; 84 years ago
- Former call signs: W75P (1940–1943); KDKA-FM (1943–1979); WPNT (1979–1986)
- Former frequencies: 47.5 MHz (1940–1949); 94.1 MHz (1946)
- Call sign meaning: "Lite" (former branding)

Technical information
- Licensing authority: FCC
- Facility ID: 73889
- Class: B
- ERP: 43,000 watts
- HAAT: 260 meters (850 ft)
- Transmitter coordinates: 40°29′43.2″N 80°00′16.2″W

Links
- Public license information: Public file; LMS
- Webcast: Listen live; Listen live (HD2)
- Website: q929fm.com; radiolaspalmaspgh.com (HD2)

WLTJ (92.9 FM, "Q92.9") is a commercial radio station in Pittsburgh, Pennsylvania, airing a hot adult contemporary format. It is owned by the Frischling family. The license is held by WPNT Media Subsidiary, LLC, identified on the website as Steel City Media. The studios are in Pittsburgh's North Hills suburbs at 5000 McKnight Road (Bypass U.S. Route 19).

The transmitter is in the Summer Hill neighborhood of Pittsburgh. The tower is co-located with WPGH-TV and WPNT. WLTJ is a grandfathered "superpower" station. While its effective radiated power (ERP) is within the maximum limit allowed for a Class B FM station, its antenna height above average terrain (HAAT) is too tall for its ERP according to current FCC rules.

WLTJ broadcasts using HD Radio technology. It offers three additional digital subchannels as well as its main analogue programming.

== History ==
=== Early years ===
On November 19, 1940, Westinghouse Radio Stations, Inc. applied to the Federal Communications Commission (FCC) for a construction permit. It wanted to build a new FM station on 47.5 MHz on the original 42-50 MHz FM broadcast band. The FCC granted the application on January 14, 1941, by which time the commission had assigned the W75P call sign to the station. The FCC then granted permission to begin broadcasting at any time beginning on April 4, 1942, followed by the station's first license on March 2, 1943.

On November 1, 1943, the station was assigned the KDKA-FM call sign. After the FCC created the current FM broadcast band on June 27, 1945, the commission granted Westinghouse Radio Stations the authority to begin operating the station on 94.1 MHz on March 19, 1946. The FCC reassigned the station to 92.9 MHz on April 8, 1946, while allowing continued operation on 94.1 MHz . On July 26, 1946, the FCC granted a license renewal for operation on both 47.5 MHz and 92.9 MHz . Subsequent renewals for operation on both frequencies would later be granted on June 1, 1947, and June 1, 1948, ending on March 1, 1949. The FCC granted Westinghouse Radio Stations a construction permit on January 23, 1947, to build new facilities for operation on 92.9 MHz, including installation of a new transmitter and antenna at a new site. The FCC granted a new license with the new facilities on June 26, 1952.

=== Experimental Stereo ===
In the late 1950s, several systems to add stereo to FM radio were considered by the FCC. Included were systems from 14 competitors, such as Crosby, Halstead, EMI, Zenith Electronics Corporation and General Electric. The individual systems were evaluated for their strengths and weaknesses during field tests in Uniontown, Pennsylvania, using KDKA-FM as the originating station. The FCC granted permission on December 4, 1958, to begin these experimental broadcasts between midnight and noon on a non-commercial basis using the KG2XIK call sign. On July 1, 1960, the FCC changed the experimental call sign to KG2XIU while extending experimental broadcast authority to September 4, 1960. While credit is given for WEFM Chicago and WGFM Schenectady, New York on June 1, 1961, as the first stereo FM broadcasters, KDKA-FM was the first to broadcast in stereo, albeit on an experimental basis.

During the 1970s, KDKA-FM was an automated station that played beautiful music during the day, and classical music at night. During morning and afternoon drive time, the station simulcast sister station KDKA 1020 AM, so both stations could offer up to the minute news, traffic and weather.

=== The Point ===
In October 1979, the station changed its call sign from KDKA-FM to WPNT (The Point), completely separating its programming from its AM sister. Westinghouse dropped the classical music for an all-beautiful music format with live announcers. It had a good debut, taking ratings away from the leading beautiful music station next to it on the dial, WJOI (93.7 FM, which later took the KDKA-FM call sign). The station then moved its studios from the KDKA home at One Gateway Center to 1051 Brinton Road, in suburban Pittsburgh community of Forest Hills.

In April 1984, Long Island-based entrepreneur Saul Frischling purchased WPNT for $3 million. Though Frischling himself was listed as the licensee, the station did business at that time as Legend Communications and then changed its name to Steel City Media in the late 1990s.

Almost immediately after Saul Frischling purchased WPNT, it switched its format from easy listening to soft adult contemporary (soft AC). The station retained the WPNT call letters and continued to bill itself as "The Point". WPNT's staff in the soft AC format included Program Director Nat Humphries hosting mornings, John Gallagher for middays, Jon Summers for afternoons, Peter Morley for evenings, Jean Lam hosting overnights, and news anchors Jeff Long and Rick Charles. A year after the ownership change, longtime KQV 1430 disc jockey George Hart replaced Humphries as Program Director and morning show host.

=== WLTJ ===
In May 1986, the station changed its call sign to WLTJ and rebranded as Lite FM 92.9 to better reflect its image as a soft AC station. (The WPNT call sign later resurfaced when MyNetworkTV affiliate WPMY unexpectedly changed its callsign to WPNT.) Not long after the change, the station moved to a new, state-of-the-art broadcast facility at Seven Parkway Center in Green Tree borough. Music was a mixture of current and recurrent adult contemporary hits with a mix of standard hits from artists such as Barry Manilow, Dionne Warwick, Barbra Streisand, and Andy Williams. Songs by those artists became a featured part of WLTJ's playlist and later became known as "Lite FM Encores". In addition, a new program known as "Heartlite" was created as a three-hour request and dedication show from 9 to midnight, hosted by Morley. The show was one of the first of its kind, where a soft AC outlet involves its listeners in choosing the songs.

Weekend and fill-in announcer Gary Love later assumed responsibilities for the morning show from Hart, and Beth Bershok assumed Jean Lam's overnight shift by the end of the 1980s, in addition to doing traffic reports with Love on the morning show. The chemistry between Love and Bershok worked so well that the decision was made in the early 1990s to pair them together and bill them as equals. "Gary and Beth in the Morning" aired from 1991 until the station's format change in 2008.

WLTJ became a strong player in the Pittsburgh Arbitron ratings, especially during office hours. In 1989, WLTJ's position as a listen-at-work radio station was challenged when Pittsburgh's longtime easy listening institution, WSHH, switched to a soft AC format and used its existing audience base to replicate WLTJ's ratings successes. WLTJ and WSHH often ran neck-and-neck in the ratings with similar formats, with one or the other occasionally shifting to the older or younger core of the 25-54 age demographic to keep up with ratings trends.

In 1993, after the FCC relaxed its ownership rules and allowed companies to own more than one FM station in the same market, Legend Communications purchased album rock formatted WRRK-FM (licensed to Braddock) from WHYW Associates. The station, which had been known as 97 Rock, reverted to its previous format of classic rock and its former moniker, Magic 97.

George Hart died of complications from liver transplant surgery in 1993.

In 1999, both stations moved to a new, more spacious location on Smithfield Street in downtown Pittsburgh, with state-of-the-art, all-digital equipment and studios built by Chief Engineer Paul Carroll. The construction lasted from August to November of that year.

Pat Bridges, who had joined the station in the early 80s in a part-time capacity, returned in 2004 to assume the role of host for "Heartlite".

The entire staff was dismissed during the format adjustment made the weekend of March 23, 2008.

=== The New "Q92.9" ===
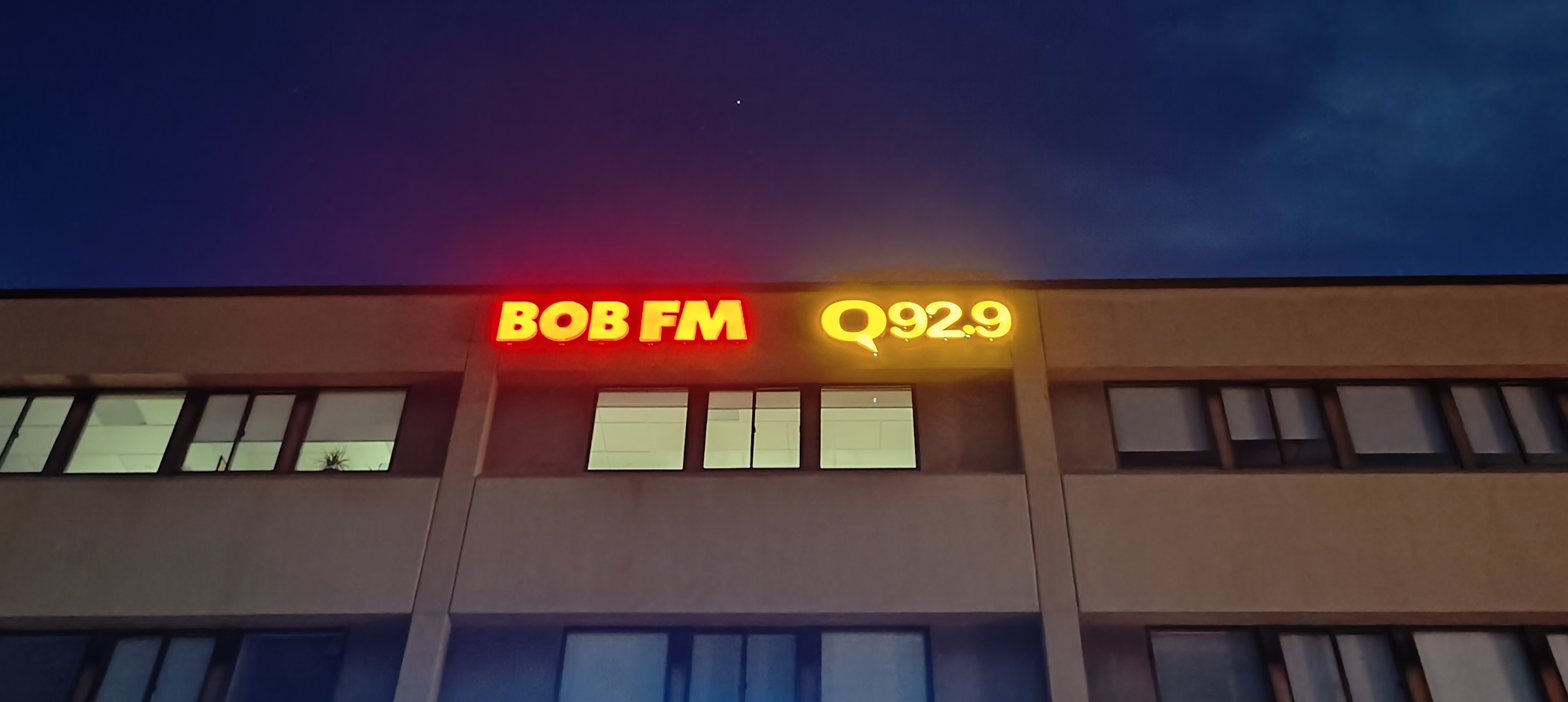
BobFM 96.9 & Q929 Building Signage 5000 McKnight Road Pittsburgh, Pa (February 2, 2023)

As the ratings declined for soft AC stations, management decided a new mainstream adult contemporary sound was needed. The WLTJ identity disappeared the weekend of March 23, 2008, and the station was rebranded as Q92.9. Station executives said they wanted to add more '90s music and felt the station needed an imaging overhaul to complete the transition. Most of the music from the 1970s was dropped, and more upbeat material from the 80s and 90s was added along with more current hits.

In November 2009, WLTJ shifted directions to Hot Adult Contemporary, with most of the musical mix focusing on more current product with only a few pre-2000 titles in the playlist.

In addition to this change, the Q-Tags that were heard at the beginning of the Q's days, where a prerecorded voice stated the name and artist of every song at its conclusion. The Q-Tags were eliminated to create a faster-paced, less interruptive musical selection.

On July 5, 2016, WLTJ dismissed the entire air staff with the exception of afternoon host/PD Zak Szabo, presumably due to ratings, which has seen the station trailing its competitors since the shift to Adult Top 40. It also displayed a new slogan, billing themselves as "Your 10 In A Row Station." WLTJ has since reinstated morning, mid-day, evening, and weekend air staff.

== HD Radio ==
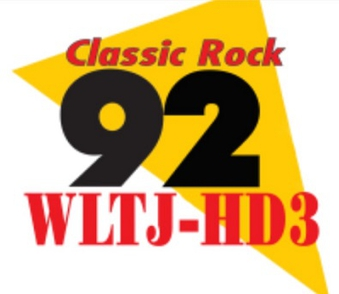

WLTJ uses HD Radio technology and broadcasts on several digital subchannels. A variety hits format was formerly found on HD2, branded "A Bit of Everything". A classic rock format is heard on HD3 branded "We Will Rock Q". A soft adult contemporary format branded "Lite FM" is on HD4. These subchannels appear to change and move around from time to time as the station once broadcast an urban adult contemporary format, branded "Q in the City" and subsequently a soft rock format branded "Q2 Lite Rock" on HD2. WLTJ also has carried Christmas music on HD4 and then later on HD2 during the holiday season.

On May 1, 2022, WLTJ-HD2 flipped to Regional Mexican as "Mega 92.9 HD2".

On October 2, 2024, WLTJ-HD2 switched to "Queso 92.9". While retaining a similar Regional Mexican/Spanish Contemporary format, it is no longer linked with La Mega Media, Inc.

On October 14, 2024, WLTJ-HD2 rebranded as "Radio Las Palmas".

== Gallery ==
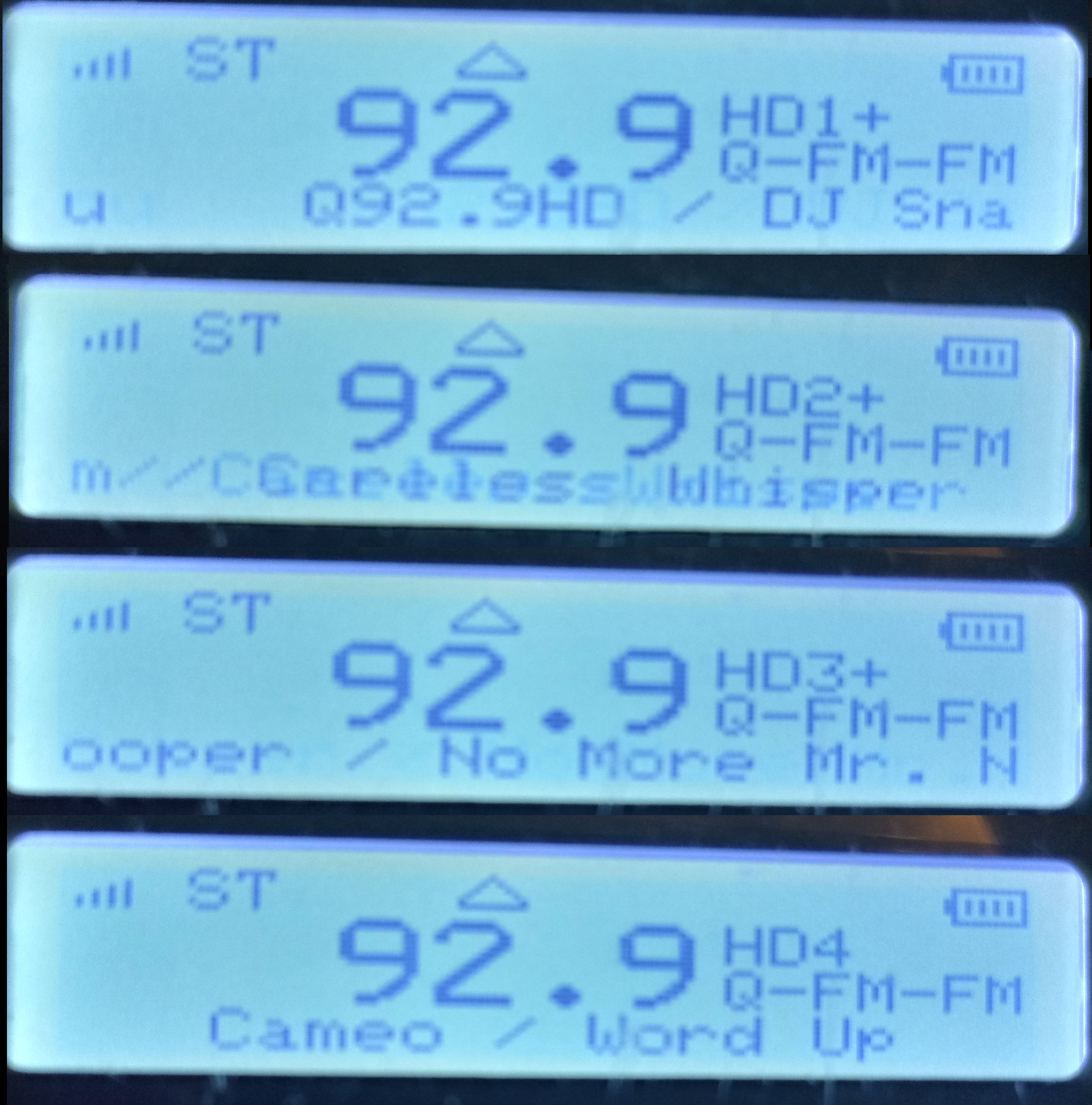
WLTJ's HD Radio Channels on a SPARC Radio with PSD and EAS

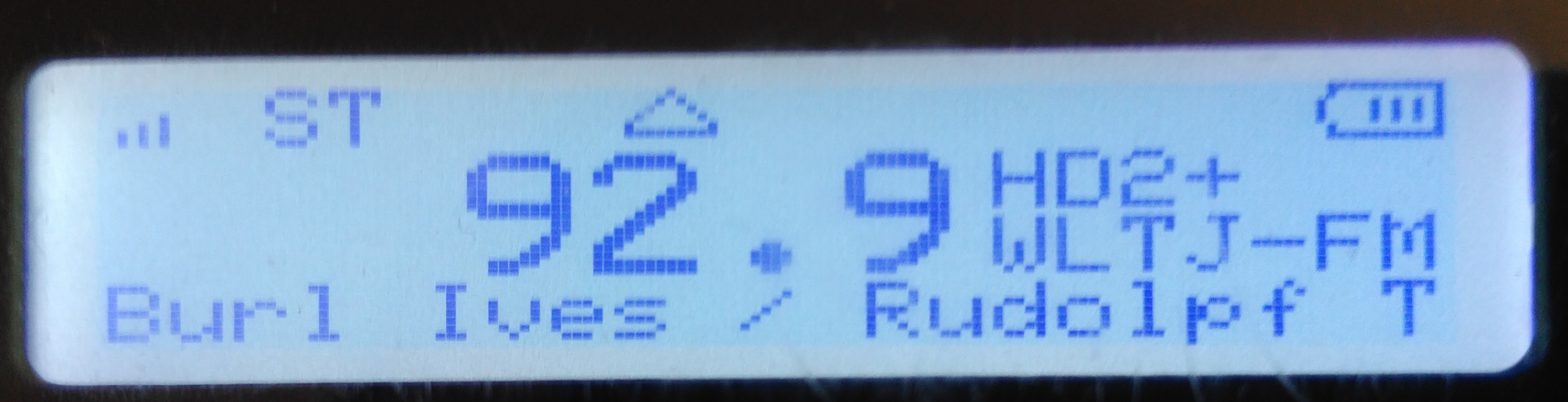
WLTJ HD2 during the 2017 holiday season with PSD and EAS

Former logo of WLTJ-HD4

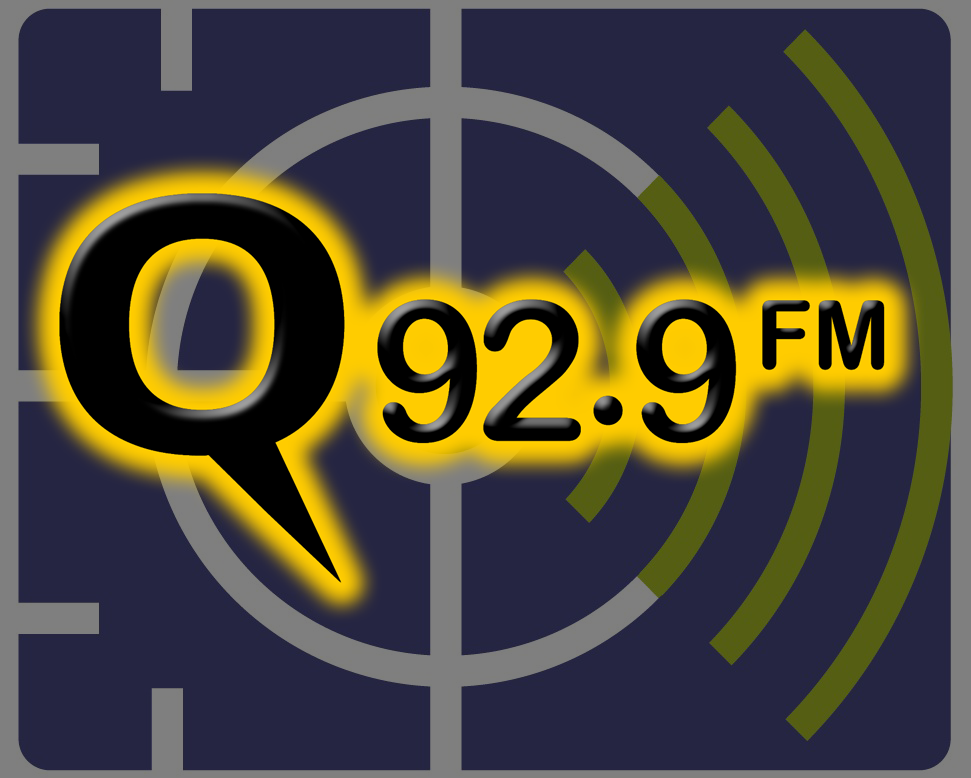
The New Logo for WLTJ "Q929"

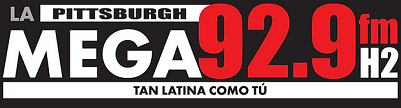
Former logo of WLTJ-HD2
