= WLCY =

Coordinates: 40.520°N 79.224°W

- Blairsville, Pennsylvania; United States
- Broadcast area: Indiana, Pennsylvania; Latrobe, Pennsylvania
- Frequency: 106.3 MHz
- Branding: Cat Country 106.3

Programming
- Format: Country
- Affiliations: Compass Media Networks; Westwood One

Ownership
- Owner: Renda Media; (Renda Broadcasting Corporation)
- Sister stations: WCCS, WDAD, WQMU

History
- First air date: September 13, 1982 (as WCQO)
- Former call signs: WCQO-FM (1982–1985); WNQQ-FM (1985–1989); WLCY-FM (1989–????)
- Call sign meaning: Lucky (WLCY's former on-air branding)

Technical information
- Licensing authority: FCC
- Facility ID: 38376
- Class: A
- ERP: 2,400 watts
- HAAT: 111 meters

Links
- Public license information: Public file; LMS
- Website: catcountry1063fm.com

WLCY (106.3 FM) is a country music formatted radio station serving Indiana, Cambria, Armstrong and Westmoreland counties in Pennsylvania. It is owned and operated by Renda Media.

== Early history ==
=== Beginnings as WCQO ===
The 106.3 license originally signed on as WCQO-FM ("CQO" being the initials of station founder Ada Ottie's daughter Constance Quinn) with a "Music of Your Life" format featuring music of the 1930s and 1940s. Charles Rutledge served as vice president and general manager of Blairsville Broadcasting Company, Inc., the original licensee, while Constance Quinn Ottie served as the station's operations manager.

The station broadcast from a two-story wood-framed house at the intersection of Routes 22 and 119 in Burrell Township, just outside the Blairsville borough limits. The ground floor housed the on-air and production studios, with sales and administrative offices on the top floor.

During these early years, the station broadcast a locally produced polka show, hosted by Mark Bertig who led the band "The Polish Friends" from the late 1970s to early 1980s. He would leave in 1985, only to return in 2002 to manage this station and three of its competitors under subsequent purchases by its present owner.

=== The WNQQ days: "Wink FM" ===
On April 15, 1985, the station was purchased by former WAMO-FM general manager Ray Gusky (dba WNQQ, Inc.), who rebranded the station with the call sign WNQQ-FM and adopted a hybrid AC /Music of Your Life format. Billed as "Wink-FM," the station added specialty programming, such as a locally based oldies program on Saturdays, "Jukebox Saturday Night with D.P. McIntire" (who would re-emerge decades later as the general manager of 101.9 WKRP in Raleigh, North Carolina) as well as a Sunday morning program featuring Irish folk music, "C'eol Na hEireann with Nancy Lee."

Transfer of the station's control went from Gusky to Jeff Dean (dba Pennsylvania Broadcast Associates) in December 1987.

=== Longo's Luckyland: WLCY and "Lucky 106.3" ===
Latrobe-based Longo Media Group purchased the station in November 1989. It was rebranded under the call letters WLCY-FM (once assigned to an AM-FM-TV combination in Tampa, Florida), revamping its soft adult contemporary format under the nickname "Lucky 106.3". After a three-year hiatus and a stint at WPXZ McIntire would return to the station in a part-time role in 1989, with G.V. Rapp coming on as program director. Tony Michaels maintained his role hosting "Jukebox Saturday Night," having inherited it from McIntire's successor, Dave Justin.

Consolidating the business offices of the station with those of WCNS in Latrobe, owner John Longo would conduct an interior renovation in 1990, moving the on-air studio into a front extension of the building. As part of the Pennsylvania Department of Transportation's Route 22/119 widening project, the building which had housed the station since its debut would be demolished in 2001. WLCY's on-air operations would be moved to Latrobe to complete its consolidation with WCNS, but a small sales office nonetheless was maintained in Blairsville.

=== Sale to Renda Broadcasting ===
Longo sold the station in 2002 to Pittsburgh-based Renda Broadcasting Corporation for $900,000, following an LMA of almost two years.

In need of additional studio space to accommodate four radio stations (WDAD, WCCS, WLCY, WQMU), Renda Broadcasting acquired the former Gatti Pharmacy building at the corner of 9th and Philadelphia Streets in downtown Indiana, where the four stations and its business operations occupy the first and second floors. As the format of the station was in many ways identical to those of the other stations in this new four station cluster, WLCY's format was changed to country music shortly after the acquisition. The station competes with WFGI-FM by playing today's best country highlighted by throwback country hits. On-Air talent includes Andy Hart with the rest of Cat Country's music automated.
