= Renda Media =

- Type: private
- Industry: Radio
- Founded: Pittsburgh, Pennsylvania; September 27, 1973
- Headquarters: 900 Parish Street, Pittsburgh, Pennsylvania, U.S.
- Area served: Pennsylvania, Florida
- Website: Renda Media

Renda Media (formerly known as Renda Broadcasting) is a privately held Pittsburgh-based radio broadcasting company founded by chief executive, Tony Renda.

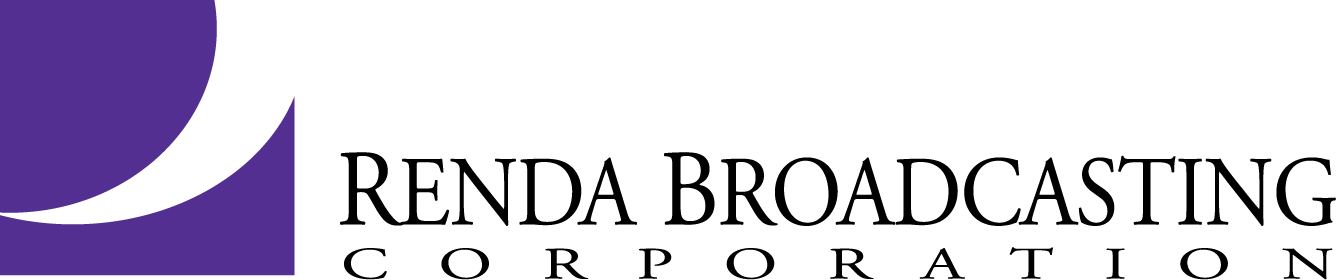
Former logo until 2022

Renda operates stations in Pennsylvania and Florida. Most stations are identified as “A hometown radio station.”

== Stations ==
Pittsburgh / Greensburg

- WSHH 99.7: Adult contemporary
- WHJB 107.1: Classic hits

Indiana / Johnstown, Pennsylvania

- WDAD 1450: Classic Hits
- WQMU 92.5: Hot AC
- WCCS 1160: News/Talk
- WLCY 106.3: Country

Punxsutawney, Pennsylvania

- WPXZ-FM 104.1: Adult contemporary
- WECZ 1540: Country
- WKQL 103.3: Classic hits

Jacksonville, Florida

- 96.1 WEJZ: Adult contemporary
- 99.9 WGNE-FM: Country

Fort Myers / Naples, Florida

- WWGR 101.9: Country
- WJGO 102.9: Bob FM
- WGUF 98.9: Talk
- WSGL 104.7: Hot AC
