= WQWK =

WQWK may refer to:

- WQWK (FM), a radio station (105.9 FM) licensed to serve Philipsburg, Pennsylvania, United States
- WLEJ (AM), a radio station (1450 AM) licensed to serve State College, Pennsylvania, which held the call sign WQWK from 2009 to 2023
- WOWY (FM), a radio station (103.1 FM) licensed to serve State College, which held the call sign WQWK from 2006 to 2009
- WGJC, a radio station (97.1 FM) licensed to serve University Park, Pennsylvania, which held the call sign WQWK from 1969 to 2005
