= WRSC =

WRSC may refer to:

- WRSC-FM, a radio station (95.3 FM) licensed to serve Bellefonte, Pennsylvania, United States
- WBHV (AM), a radio station (1390 AM) licensed to serve State College, Pennsylvania, United States, which held the call sign WRSC from 1961 to 2023
- WOWY (FM), a radio station (103.1 FM) licensed to serve State College, which held the call sign WRSC-FM from 2009 to 2016
- World Robotic Sailing Championship, a competition open to fully autonomous and unmanned sailing boats
- Ngloram Airport (ICAO code WRSC)
- War Resisters Support Campaign, a Canadian non-profit community organization
