= WMAJ =

WMAJ may refer to:

- WMAJ (AM), a radio station (1230 AM) licensed to serve Elmira, New York, United States
- WZWW (FM), a radio station (93.7 FM) licensed to serve Boalsburg, Pennsylvania, United States, which held the call sign WMAJ from 2019 to 2023
- WBUS (FM), a radio station (99.5 FM) licensed to serve Centre Hall, Pennsylvania, which held the call sign WMAJ-FM from 2007 to 2019
- WLEJ (AM) - a radio station (1450 AM) licensed to serve State College, Pennsylvania, which formerly held the call sign WMAJ
- the ICAO code for Jendarata Airport
