= WBHV =

WBHV may refer to:

- WBHV (AM), a radio station (1390 AM) licensed to State College, Pennsylvania, United States
- WNLI (FM), a radio station (94.5 FM) licensed to State College, Pennsylvania, which held the call sign WBHV-FM from 2006 to 2023
- WBHV (Somerset, Pennsylvania), a defunct radio station (1330 AM) licensed to Somerset, Pennsylvania, which held the call sign from 2005 to 2011
- WOWY (FM), a radio station (103.1 FM) licensed to State College, Pennsylvania, United States, which held the call sign WBHV from 1988 to 2005
