= QWK =

QWK may refer to:

- every week, medication dosage term
- QWK (file format), used by offline mail readers
- WLEJ (AM) 1450 AM, "QWK" Rock, radio station broadcasting from State College, Pennsylvania, USA
  - WQWK (FM) 105.9 FM, which also carries the QWK brand in State College, Pennsylvania, USA
  - WOWY (FM) 103.1 FM, a defunct station of State College, Pennsylvania, USA
