= WJUN =

WJUN may refer to:

- WJUN (AM), a radio station (1220 AM) licensed to serve Mexico, Pennsylvania, United States
- WIBF (FM), a radio station (92.5 FM) licensed to serve Mexico, Pennsylvania, which held the call sign WJUN-FM from 1988 to 2015
