= WHUN =

WHUN may refer to:

- WHUN (AM), a radio station (1150 AM) licensed to serve Huntingdon, Pennsylvania, United States
- WHUN-FM, a radio station (103.5 FM) licensed to serve Huntingdon, Pennsylvania
- WDBF-FM, a radio station (106.3 FM) licensed to serve Mount Union, Pennsylvania, which held the call sign WHUN-FM from 2009 to 2015
- WJPJ, a radio station (1190 AM) licensed to serve Humboldt, Tennessee, United States, which held the call sign WHUN from 2010 to 2012
