= WOWY =

WOWY may refer to:

- WOWY (FM), a radio station (103.1 FM) licensed to serve State College, Pennsylvania, United States
- WGJC, a radio station (97.1 FM) licensed to serve University Park, Pennsylvania, which held the call sign WOWY from 2005 to 2023
