= WBUS =

WBUS may refer to:

- WBUS (FM), a radio station (99.5 FM) licensed to serve Centre Hall, Pennsylvania, United States
- WZWW (FM), a radio station (93.7 FM) licensed to serve Boalsburg, Pennsylvania, which held the call sign WBUS from 1997 to 2019
- WYHI, a radio station (99.9 FM) licensed to serve Park Forest, Illinois, United States, which held the call sign WBUS from 1987 to 1996
- WBZW, a radio station (96.7 FM) licensed to serve Union City, Georgia, United States, which held the call sign WBUS from 1985 to 1987
- WMIA-FM, a radio station (93.9 FM) licensed to serve Miami Beach, Florida, United States, which held the call sign WBUS from 1969 to 1976
