= WLTS =

WLTS may refer to:

- WLTS (FM), a radio station (103.3 FM) licensed to serve Greer, South Carolina, United States
- WBUS (FM), a radio station (99.5 FM) licensed to serve Centre Hall, Pennsylvania, United States, which held the call sign WLTS from 2006 to 2007
- WNLI (FM), a radio station (94.5 FM) licensed to serve State College, Pennsylvania, which held the call sign WLTS from 2001 to 2006
- WCKW, a radio station (1010 AM) licensed to serve Garyville, Louisiana, United States, which held the call sign WLTS in 2000
- WWL-FM, a radio station (105.3 FM) licensed to serve Kenner, Louisiana, which held the call sign WLTS in 1984 and WLTS-FM from 1984 to 2000
- WGSO, a radio station (990 AM) licensed to serve New Orleans, Louisiana, which held the call sign WLTS from 1984 to 1985
