= WZWW =

WZWW may refer to:

- WZWW (FM), a radio station (93.7 FM) licensed to serve Boalsburg, Pennsylvania, United States
- WRSC-FM, a radio station (95.3 FM) licensed to serve Bellefonte, Pennsylvania, which held the call sign WZWW from 1986 to 2023
