= WWSH =

WWSH may refer to:

- WWSH-LP, a low-power radio station (97.7 FM) licensed to serve Vero Beach, Florida, United States
- WFXS (FM), a radio station (98.7 FM) licensed to serve Pleasant Gap, Pennsylvania, United States, which held the call sign WWSH from 2008 to 2011
- WUMR (FM), a radio station (106.1 FM) licensed to serve Philadelphia, Pennsylvania, United States, which held the call sign WWSH from 1970 to 1984
