= WUBZ =

WUBZ may refer to:

- WUBZ-LP, a low-power radio station (100.7 FM) licensed to serve Tuskegee, Alabama, United States
- WQWK (FM), a radio station (105.9 FM) licensed to serve Philipsburg, Pennsylvania, United States, which held the call sign WUBZ-FM from 1996 to 2006
