= WMRF-FM =

Radio station in Lewistown, Pennsylvania

- Lewistown, Pennsylvania; United States
- Broadcast area: Mifflin County, Pennsylvania; Juniata County, Pennsylvania
- Frequency: 95.7 MHz
- Branding: Merf Radio

Programming
- Format: Hot adult contemporary

Ownership
- Owner: Seven Mountains Media; (Southern Belle, LLC)
- Sister stations: WHUN; WIBF; WJUN; WLUI; WNNA

History
- Call sign meaning: "Merf"

Technical information
- Licensing authority: FCC
- Facility ID: 42131
- Class: A
- ERP: 310 watts
- HAAT: 433 meters (1,421 ft)
- Transmitter coordinates: 40°34′21″N 77°30′49″W

Links
- Public license information: Public file; LMS
- Webcast: Listen Live
- Website: www.merfradio.com

WMRF-FM (95.7 FM) is a hot adult contemporary radio station in Lewistown, Pennsylvania, United States, branded as "Merf Radio". The station serves communities throughout Mifflin County, and Juniata County. The station is owned by Seven Mountains Media, through licensee Southern Belle, LLC. WMRF-FM's studios are in downtown Lewistown.

In late 2015, WLAK (103.5 FM) ended its simulcast of WMRF-FM, and instead became Hunny 103.5, broadcasting a classic hits format. Hunny was formerly broadcasting at 106.3. The move also decreased the listening area, since WHUN broadcasts from Huntingdon.

== On-air personalities ==
- Rocco Pallotto
- Aly Reichenbach
- Matt Witzel
