= WIBF (disambiguation) =

WIBF may refer to:

- Women's International Boxing Federation
- WIBF (FM), a radio station (92.5 FM) licensed to serve Mexico, Pennsylvania, United States
- WPPZ-FM, a radio station (103.9 FM) licensed to serve Jenkintown, Pennsylvania, which held the call signs WIBF-FM or WIBF from 1960 to 1996
