= WWJL =

WWJL may refer to:

- WFXS (FM), a radio station (98.7 FM) licensed to serve Pleasant Gap, Pennsylvania, United States, which held the WWJL call sign in 2023
- WWJL-LP, a defunct low-power radio station (95.9 FM) formerly licensed to serve Brookville, Pennsylvania
