= Froggy 101 =

The name Froggy 101 may represent any of these stations that carry the Froggy branding:

- WGGY 101.3 FM, Scranton, Pennsylvania
- WFGE 101.1 FM, State College, Pennsylvania
