= WBSS =

WBSS may refer to:

- World Boxing Super Series, a professional boxing tournament
- WBSS (AM), a radio station (1490 AM) licensed to Pleasantville, New Jersey, United States
- WDBF-FM, a radio station (106.3 FM) licensed to Mount Union, Pennsylvania, United States, which used the call sign WBSS from 2008 to 2009
- WENJ, a radio station (97.3 FM) licensed to Millville, New Jersey, United States, which used the call sign WBSS-FM from 1988 to 2002
- WTPA (AM), a radio station (980 AM) licensed to Pompano Beach, Florida, United States, which used the call sign WBSS from 1982 to 1986
- "Wanna Be Startin' Somethin'", a song by American singer Michael Jackson.
