= WFXS =

WFXS may refer to:

- WFXS (FM), a radio station (98.7 FM) licensed to serve Pleasant Gap, Pennsylvania, United States
- WFXS-DT, a defunct television station (channel 31, virtual 55) formerly licensed to serve Wittenberg, Wisconsin, United States
