= WQCK =

WQCK may refer to:

- WQWK (FM), a radio station (105.9 FM) licensed to serve Philipsburg, Pennsylvania, United States, which held the call sign WQCK from 2009 to 2023
- WBKL (FM), a radio station (92.7 FM) licensed to serve Clinton, Louisiana, United States, which held the call sign WQCK from 1983 to 2006
