= WGMR =

WGMR may refer to:

- WGMR (FM), a radio station (91.3 FM) licensed to serve Effingham, Illinois, United States
- WFGE, a radio station (101.1 FM) licensed to serve Tyrone, Pennsylvania, United States, which held the call sign WGMR from 1961 to 2008
- Willow Glen Morning Ride - a Race Ride (bicycle) in the Willow Glen, San Jose, California area.
