= WEMR =

WEMR may refer to:

- WEMR-LP, a low-power radio station (92.7 FM) licensed to serve Chambersburg, Pennsylvania, United States
- WFXS (FM) (98.7 FM) in Pleasant Gap, Pennsylvania
- WGMM (1460 AM) in Tunkhannock, Pennsylvania
