= Fermanagh (disambiguation) =

Fermanagh was a kingdom of Gaelic Ireland, associated geographically with present-day County Fermanagh.

Fermanagh may also refer to:

- County Fermanagh, one of the six counties of Northern Ireland
  - County Fermanagh (Parliament of Ireland constituency) until 1800
  - County Fermanagh (UK Parliament constituency) 1801–85
  - Fermanagh GAA, intercounty sport team
- Fermanagh District Council, one of the 26 district councils of Northern Ireland, covering a slightly larger area than the county
- Fermanagh Township, Juniata County, Pennsylvania, USA
- Viscount Fermanagh junior title of Earl Verney
- Baron Fermanagh junior title of Earl Erne
