= Walker Township, Juniata County, Pennsylvania =

Township in Pennsylvania, US

Coordinates: 40°33′00″N 77°22′35″W

- Township
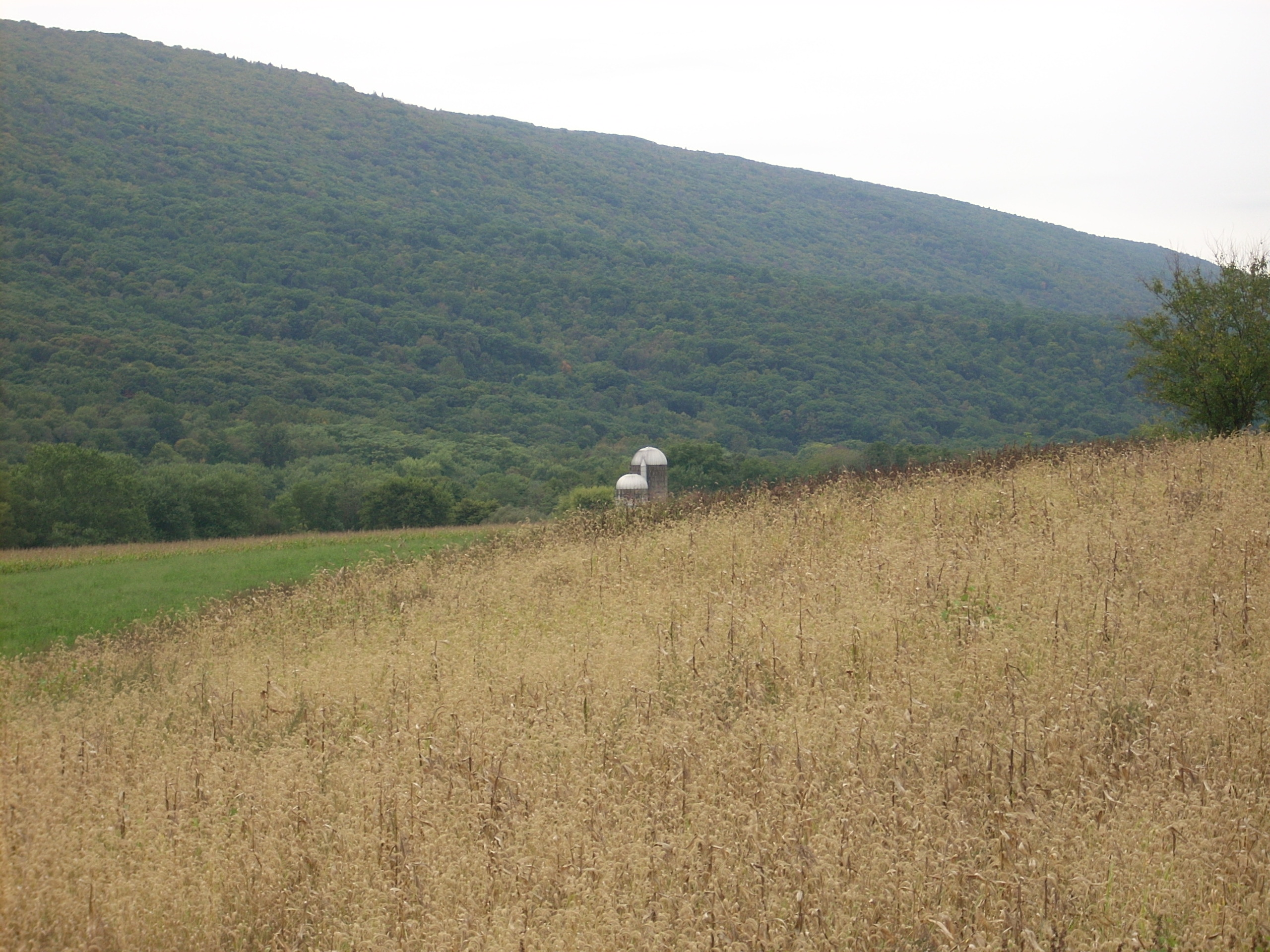
- Farm and mountain in Walker Township

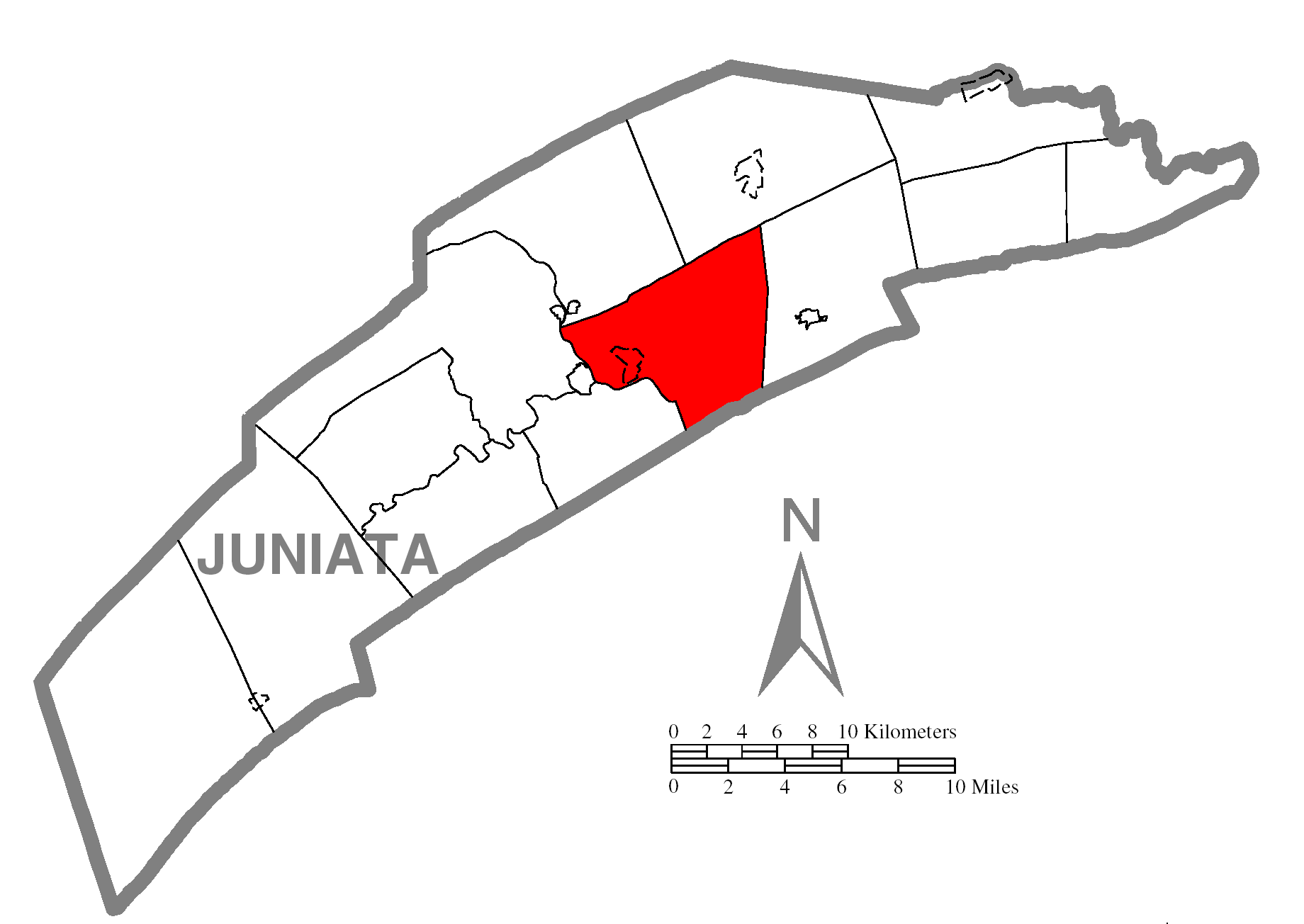
- Map of Juniata County, Pennsylvania highlighting Walker Township

- Map of Juniata County, Pennsylvania
- Country: United States
- State: Pennsylvania
- County: Juniata
- Settled: 1765
- Incorporated: 1822

Area
  - Total: 29.35 sq mi (76.02 km^{2})
  - Land: 28.83 sq mi (74.66 km^{2})
  - Water: 0.52 sq mi (1.35 km^{2})

Population (2020)
  - Total: 2,797 ▲
  - Estimate (2022): 2,793
  - Density: 95.9/sq mi (37.02/km^{2})
- Time zone: UTC-5 (EST)
  - Summer (DST): UTC-4 (EDT)
- Area code: 717
- FIPS code: 42-067-80568
- Website: walkertownship.org

Walker Township is a township in Juniata County, Pennsylvania, United States. The population was 2,797 at the 2020 census.

== Geography ==
According to the United States Census Bureau, the township has a total area of 29.35 square miles (76.02 km^{2}), of which 28.83 square miles (74.66 km^{2}) are land and 0.52 square miles (1.35 km^{2}), or 1.78%, are water.

Walker Township is in central Juniata County and is bordered by Fermanagh and Fayette Townships to the north, Delaware Township to the east, Perry County to the south, and Turbett Township to the west and south. The borough of Port Royal and Milford Township form the western border of the township. The census-designated place of Mexico is along the Juniata River in Walker Township. Other unincorporated places in the township include Vandyke, Centre, Locust Run, Mount Pleasant, and Van Wert.

== Demographics ==
Historical population
Census	Pop.	Note	%±
1850	1,493		—
1860	1,719		15.1%
1870	1,608		−6.5%
1880	1,699		5.7%
1890	1,490		−12.3%
1900	1,392		−6.6%
1910	1,417		1.8%
1920	1,352		−4.6%
1930	1,524		12.7%
1940	1,681		10.3%
1950	1,620		−3.6%
1960	1,755		8.3%
1970	1,767		0.7%
1980	2,124		20.2%
1990	2,331		9.7%
2000	2,598		11.5%
2010	2,738		5.4%
2020	2,797		2.2%
2022 (est.)	2,793		−0.1%
U.S. Decennial Census

As of the census of 2000, there were 2,598 people, 920 households, and 734 families residing in the township. The population density was 89.5 inhabitants per square mile (34.6/km^{2}). There were 997 housing units at an average density of 34.4 per square mile (13.3/km^{2}). The racial makeup of the township was 98.85% White, 0.50% African American, 0.04% Native American, 0.19% Asian, 0.23% from other races, and 0.19% from two or more races. Hispanic or Latino of any race were 0.58% of the population.

There were 920 households, out of which 35.8% had children under the age of 18 living with them, 71.2% were married couples living together, 5.1% had a female householder with no husband present, and 20.2% were non-families. 16.8% of all households were made up of individuals, and 9.2% had someone living alone who was 65 years of age or older. The average household size was 2.82 and the average family size was 3.18.

In the township the population was spread out, with 27.1% under the age of 18, 8.1% from 18 to 24, 29.0% from 25 to 44, 23.0% from 45 to 64, and 12.8% who were 65 years of age or older. The median age was 36 years. For every 100 females there were 102.0 males. For every 100 females age 18 and over, there were 97.3 males.

The median income for a household in the township was $37,639, and the median income for a family was $41,351. Males had a median income of $27,047 versus $22,070 for females. The per capita income for the township was $16,118. About 6.4% of families and 9.6% of the population were below the poverty line, including 12.8% of those under age 18 and 6.3% of those age 65 or over.

Walker Township was unfortunately the municipality in which a lone gunman took on the state and local law enforcement on July 8, 2023, critically wounding one Pennsylvania State Police Lieutenant and killing a State Trooper. The gunman was killed in a shootout that day with law enforcement.
