= WFXS (FM) =

Radio station in Pleasant Gap, Pennsylvania

Coordinates: 40.933°N 77.761°W

Currently silent
- Pleasant Gap, Pennsylvania; United States
- Broadcast area: State College
- Frequency: 98.7 MHz
- Branding: Sports Radio 98.7 - The Fox

Programming
- Format: Sports
- Affiliations: Fox Sports Radio

Ownership
- Owner: SkyWave Broadcasting Inc. (sale to Seven Mountains Media pending)

History
- First air date: December 1995
- Former call signs: WZRZ (1995–2000); WLTS-FM (2000–2001); WOJZ (2001–2003); WOWY (2003–2005); WQWK (2005–2006); WSGY (2006–2008); WWSH (2008–2011); WEMR (2011–2015); WFEQ (2015–2019); WLEJ (2019–January 2023); WWJL (January–March 2023); WLEJ-FM (March–June 2023)
- Call sign meaning: "Fox Sports"

Technical information
- Licensing authority: FCC
- Facility ID: 30445
- Class: A
- ERP: 2,200 watts
- HAAT: 168 meters (551 ft)

Links
- Public license information: Public file; LMS

WFXS (98.7 MHz) is a sports FM radio station licensed to Pleasant Gap, Pennsylvania, United States, and serving the State College area that is currently silent. It is owned by SkyWave Broadcasting Inc.

== History ==
The station was originally licensed to Mill Hall, Pennsylvania, as WZRZ in December 1995. Engineer Jack (Jay) Kennedy found this available frequency and sold the construction permit to Sabatino Cupelli. Cupelli built it out and put it on the air playing classic hits as Eagle 98.7 FM.

Later on, the station was sold to Forever Broadcasting and the community of license was changed to Pleasant Gap. The station adopted the call letters WLTS-FM in late 2000. During Forever's ownership, the station carried several formats including smooth jazz under the calls WOJZ, adult rock as WQWK and country as WSGY, a repeater of Froggy 98 from Altoona, Pennsylvania. In 2008, WSGY was sold to 2510 Associates who also operated State College stations WBHV-FM and WOWY. The new owners broadcast a soft adult contemporary format programmed by Nick Ferrara using the handle 98.7 Wish-FM and the call letters WWSH. The Wish Wake-Up Show was hosted by State College Radio veteran Ruth O'Brien.

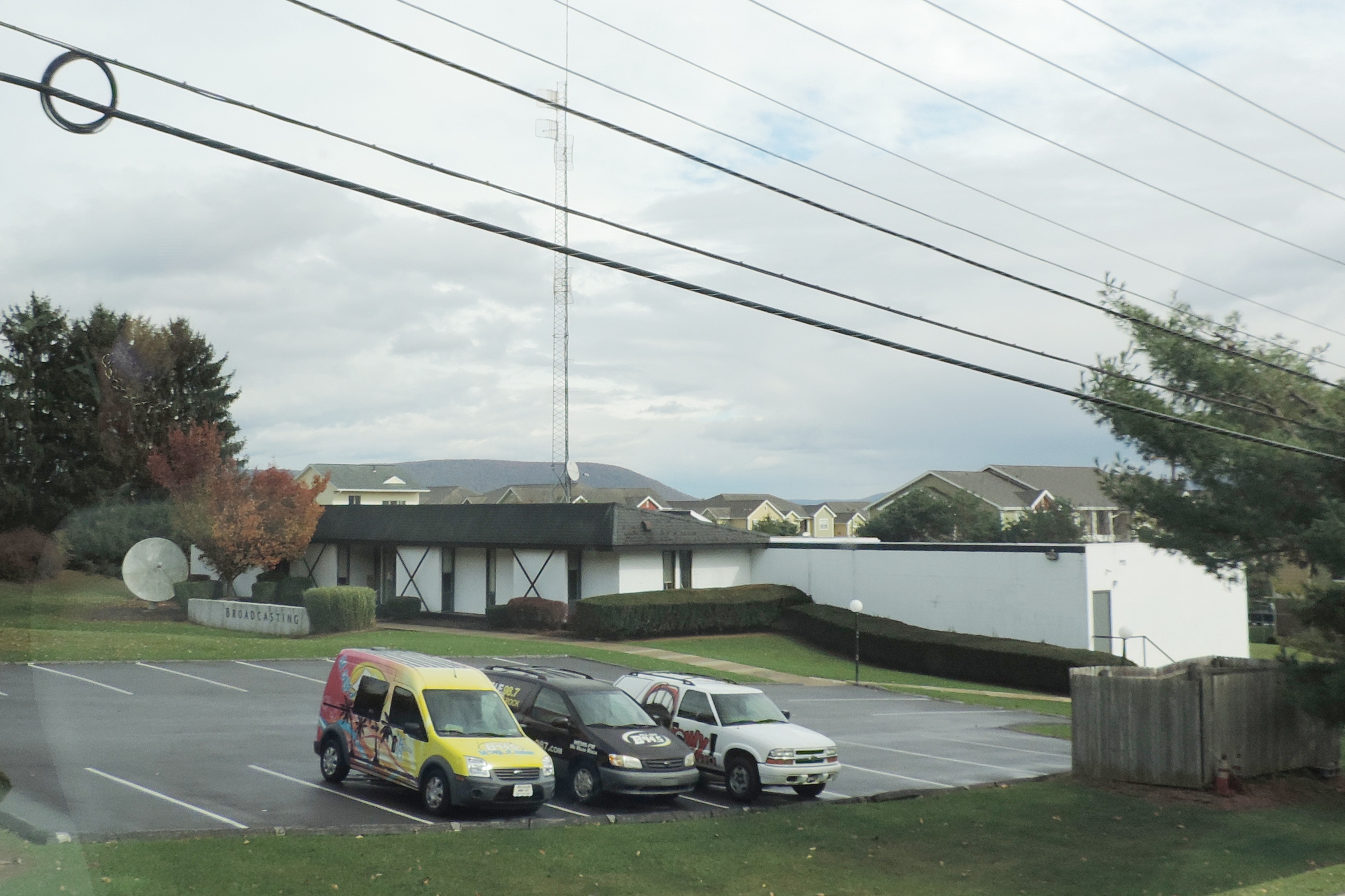
Studio

On August 18, 2011, WWSH changed its format to mainstream rock, branded as "Eagle 98.7" under new call letters, WEMR. The Eagle lineup included the "Morning Drive" with Wentz and The Drive Home "Overdrive" with Bickel.

On July 3, 2015, WEMR changed its format to adult album alternative (AAA), branded as "98.7 The Freq", and was granted the WFEQ call letters.

On March 19, 2019, WFEQ moved "The Freq" to online only and began stunting with a loop of Alan Jackson’s "Gone Country" ahead of a country format switch. Between playing of the songs were effects of grunts and something eating a frog, which was a reference to Forever Media’s WFGE. It was expected that this station would become "Bigfoot Country" after stunting.

On March 21, 2019, at noon, WFEQ ended stunting and launched a classic country format, branded as "Bigfoot Country Legends" under new WLEJ call letters, with the first song being "Bigfoot Song" by Gary Nicholson.

On December 30, 2022, it was announced that the format would move to WQWK and WPHB within days. On January 3, 2023, WLEJ dropped its classic country format and began stunting, simultaneously changing its call sign to WWJL. As this resulted in the station erroneously duplicating a call sign already assigned to another station, the call sign was changed to WLEJ-FM on March 1.

On June 15, 2023, it was announced that Covenant Communications would sell WLEJ-FM to SkyWave Broadcasting Inc. for $325,000; the sale was consummated on September 29. On June 23, WLEJ-FM changed its call sign to WFXS.

On July 17, WFXS launched a sports radio format known as 98.7 the Fox, featuring programming from Fox Sports Radio and Motor Racing Network.

In February 2026, the station went silent for undisclosed reasons. On August 20, 2026, SkyWave announced it was selling WFXS to Seven Mountains Media for the cancellation of the debt and interest remaining on their $275,000 promissory note and the unpaid tower rent owed from their purchase of the station back in 2023.

== In popular culture ==
In season 6, episode 26 of the American version of The Office, Michael Scott mentions the radio station "Froggy 98.7".
