= WLUI =

Radio station in Lewistown, Pennsylvania

- Lewistown, Pennsylvania; United States
- Broadcast area: South Central Pennsylvania
- Frequency: 670 kHz
- Branding: Big Lewie

Programming
- Format: Oldies
- Affiliations: ABC News Radio; Penn State Nittany Lions

Ownership
- Owner: Seven Mountains Media; (Southern Belle, LLC)
- Sister stations: WHUN; WIBF; WJUN; WMRF-FM; WNNA

History
- First air date: June 1, 1941
- Former call signs: WMRF (1941–1985); WIEZ (1985–2017)
- Former frequencies: 1490 kHz (1941–1989)
- Call sign meaning: Sounds like "Lewie," a play on its home borough of Lewistown

Technical information
- Licensing authority: FCC
- Facility ID: 42134
- Class: D
- Power: 5,400 watts (daytime only)
- Transmitter coordinates: 40°36′26″N 77°34′44″W
- Translator: 92.9 W225CK (Lewistown)

Links
- Public license information: Public file; LMS
- Webcast: Listen live
- Website: biglewie.com

WLUI (670 kHz) is a commercial radio station licensed to Lewistown, Pennsylvania, United States, and serving State College and Central Pennsylvania. It is owned by Seven Mountains Media with the license held by Southern Belle, LLC. WLUI airs an oldies radio format, featuring hits of the 1960s, 70s and 80s.

WLUI is a daytimer station, powered at 5,400 watts, using a non-directional antenna. Because 670 AM is a clear-channel frequency, on which WSCR in Chicago is the dominant Class A station, WLUI must leave the air at night to avoid interference. WLUI programming can be heard 24hrs a day on its FM translator, W225CK at 92.9 MHz.

== History ==
=== Early years on 1490 AM ===
Originally WMRF, the station signed on the air on June 1, 1941. It had 250 watts of power and it broadcast on 1490 kHz. The call letters stood for the initials of the name of the owner. WMRF had its studios in Hotel Coleman and it was an affiliate of the NBC Red Network. It carried NBC's schedule of dramas, comedies, sports and news through the 1940s and 50s.

Just after World War II, Lewistown Broadcasting Company expanded, applying for an FM station in Lewistown as well as an AM and eventually an FM station in Altoona, Pennsylvania. In Lewistown, the FM station was granted and constructed as WLTN-FM on 97.9. The transmitter site for WMRF was moved to the WLTN-FM site in Derry Township (Big Ridge) just north of Lewistown. The move was to provide an economical operation. At the time, a licensed engineer was required to be on duty when the station was on the air. Few people owned FM receivers in that era and in 1954, the license was turned back to the Federal Communications Commission (FCC).

=== Adding a new FM station ===
In 1964, the FCC came out with a new allocation table, which included 95.9 for Lewistown, Pennsylvania. The company applied and received a grant for 95.9 MHz, which signed on as a full time simulcast of WMRF in 1964. WMRF-FM used the original WLTN-FM building but operated from a 60-foot (18 m) telephone pole instead of mounting on the WMRF-FM tower. The old WLTN-FM antenna remained in place until the original tower was dismantled in 1981.

In 1980, the antenna was replaced with a taller tower to provide better coverage for the FM station. It also gave WMRF a 5/8 wave tower which had a significant improvement to its coverage.

In 1985, the call letters were changed to WIEZ (EZ-1490) as programming on WMRF-FM and WIEZ were now separated.

=== Move to 670 ===
In 1988, WIEZ applied to move to 670 kHz which would give it wider coverage. The daytime power would increase to 5,400 watts. However, 670 is a daytimer frequency with the station giving up the 1490 full-time frequency. After the move in 1989, the format was initially oldies.

WIEZ switched to a talk radio format, which lasted until January 3, 2017. It carried mostly syndicated talk hosts featuring Dr. Joy Browne, Glenn Beck, Rush Limbaugh, and Sean Hannity.

On January 3, WIEZ flipped from talk back to oldies, branded as "Big Lewie", slang for Lewistown, its city of license. The new WLUI call sign was already put into place on January 2, 2017, and a simulcast on FM translator W225CK 92.9 MHz Lewistown was added.
