= Milford Township, Juniata County, Pennsylvania =

Township in Pennsylvania, US

Coordinates: 40°33′00″N 77°28′59″W

- Township
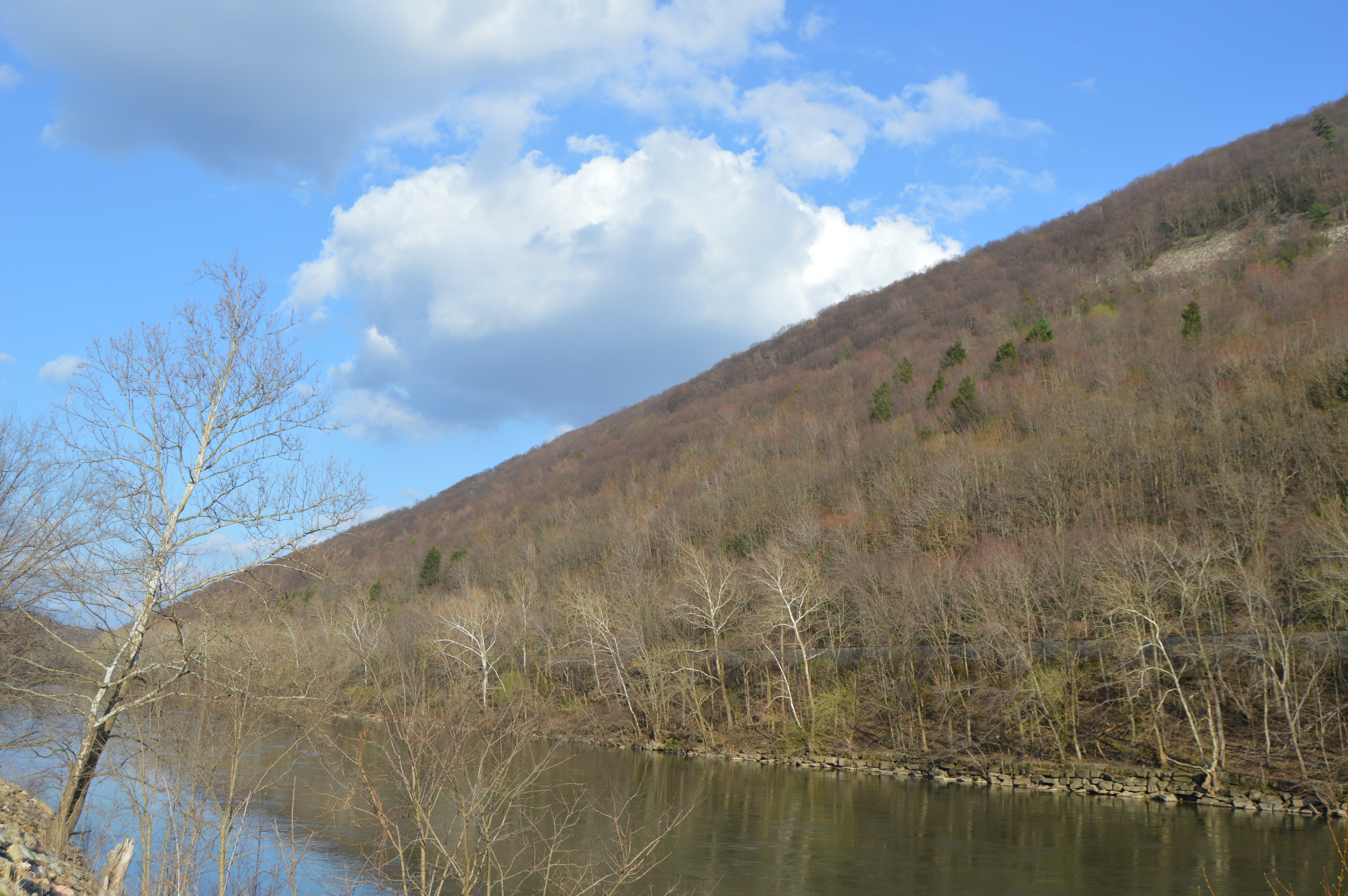
- Blue Mountain at the Lewistown Narrows

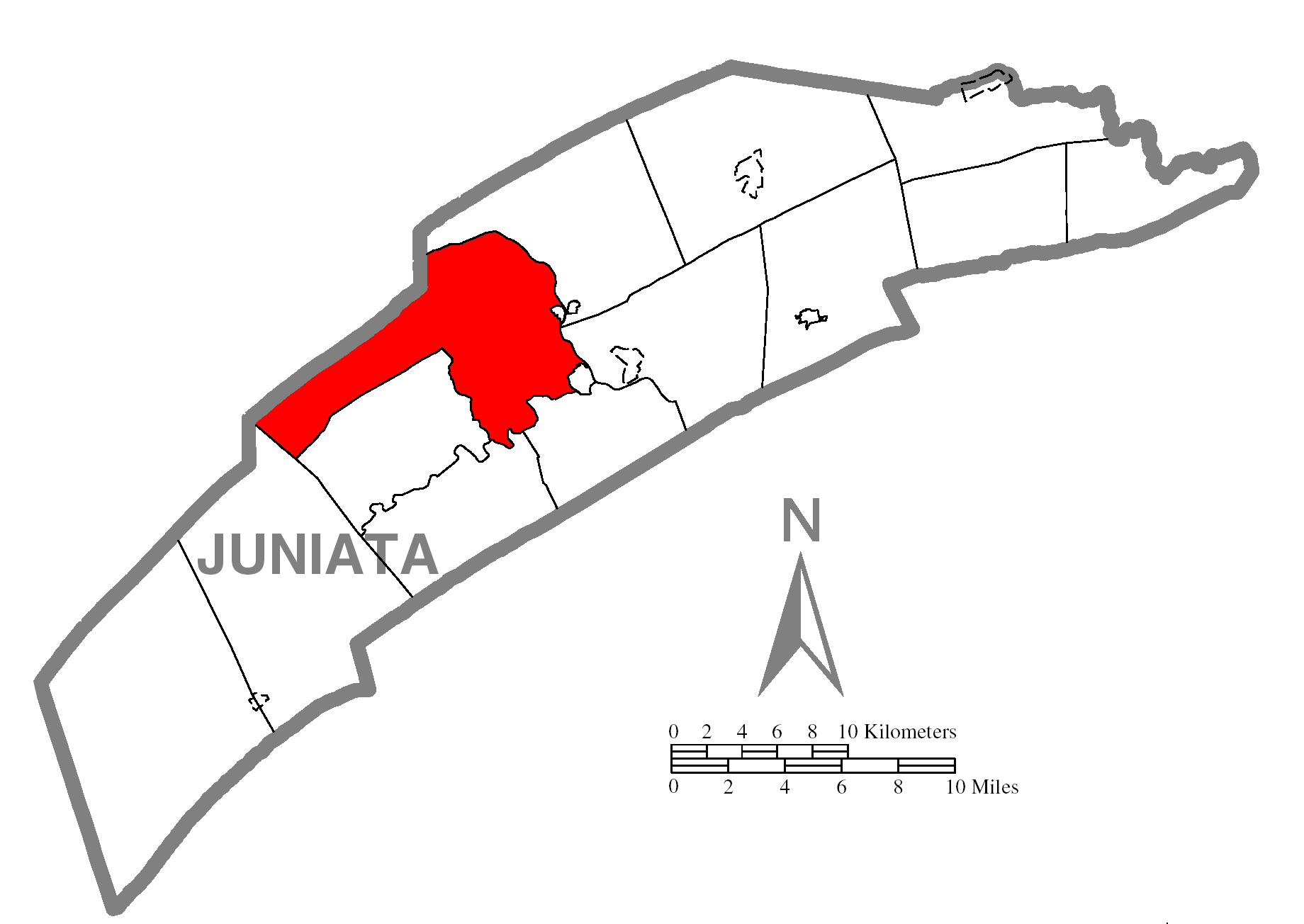
- Map of Juniata County, Pennsylvania highlighting Milford Township

- Map of Juniata County, Pennsylvania
- Country: United States
- State: Pennsylvania
- County: Juniata
- Settled: 1755
- Incorporated: 1768

Area
  - Total: 40.51 sq mi (104.91 km^{2})
  - Land: 40.05 sq mi (103.73 km^{2})
  - Water: 0.46 sq mi (1.18 km^{2})

Population (2020)
  - Total: 1,989 ▼
  - Estimate (2022): 1,977
  - Density: 53/sq mi (20.3/km^{2})
- Time zone: UTC-5 (EST)
  - Summer (DST): UTC-4 (EDT)
- Area code: 717
- FIPS code: 42-067-49392
- Website: https://www.milfordtwpjuniata.com/

Milford Township is a township in Juniata County, Pennsylvania, United States. The population was 1,989 at the 2020 census, a decline from the figure of 2,088 tabulated in 2010.

== Geography ==
According to the United States Census Bureau, the township has a total area of 40.5 square miles (104.9 km^{2}), of which 40.0 square miles (103.7 km^{2}) are land and 0.46 square miles (1.2 km^{2}), or 1.13%, are water. It is in the Ridge-and-Valley province of the Appalachian Mountains. Blue Mountain forms the northwest border of the township, and Shade Mountain, a parallel ridge, forms the western part of the southern boundary. The Juniata River forms the northern and eastern border of the township, and Tuscarora Creek, a tributary, forms the eastern part of the southern boundary.

Milford Township is bordered by Mifflin County to the north, Fermanagh Township to the north and east, Walker Township to the east, Port Royal to the south and east, Turbett and Spruce Hill Townships to the south, and Beale Township to the west and south. The borough of Mifflin borders a portion of the township in the east, and Port Royal borders the southeast corner. Unincorporated communities in the township include Denholm, Rockville, and Martins Crossroad.

Pennsylvania Route 35 crosses the eastern part of the township, leading east into Mifflin. Pennsylvania Route 333 follows the Juniata River through the Lewistown Narrows in the northern part of the township, connecting Mifflin with Lewistown to the west.

== Demographics ==
Historical population
Census	Pop.	Note	%±
1850	1,095		—
1860	1,102		0.6%
1870	1,158		5.1%
1880	1,341		15.8%
1890	1,276		−4.8%
1900	1,204		−5.6%
1910	1,177		−2.2%
1920	1,240		5.4%
1930	1,194		−3.7%
1940	974		−18.4%
1950	944		−3.1%
1960	1,033		9.4%
1970	1,160		12.3%
1980	1,452		25.2%
1990	1,429		−1.6%
2000	1,758		23.0%
2010	2,088		18.8%
2020	1,989		−4.7%
2022 (est.)	1,977		−0.6%
U.S. Decennial Census

As of the census of 2000, there were 1,758 people, 687 households, and 504 families residing in the township. The population density was 43.9 inhabitants per square mile (16.9/km^{2}). There were 747 housing units at an average density of 18.7/sq mi (7.2/km^{2}). The racial makeup of the township was 95.34% White, 0.17% African American, 0.17% Native American, 0.68% Asian, 2.16% from other races, and 1.48% from two or more races. Hispanic or Latino of any race were 5.97% of the population.

There were 687 households, 27.2% of which had children under the age of 18 living with them, 64.2% were married couples living together, 5.8% had a female householder with no husband present, and 26.6% were nonfamilies. 22.9% of all households were made up of individuals, and 9.5% had someone living alone who was 65 years of age or older. The average household size was 2.45, and the average family size was 2.85.

In the township the population was spread out, with 20.4% under the age of 18, 7.7% from 18 to 24, 29.0% from 25 to 44, 25.0% from 45 to 64, and 17.8% who were 65 years of age or older. The median age was 41 years. For every 100 females, there were 95.6 males. For every 100 females age 18 and over, there were 95.9 males.

The median income for a household in the township was $36,536, and the median income for a family was $42,171. Males had a median income of $30,400 versus $20,804 for females. The per capita income for the township was $16,677. About 5.8% of families and 7.7% of the population were below the poverty line, including 7.9% of those under age 18 and 6.5% of those age 65 or over.
