= Turbett Township, Pennsylvania =

Township in Pennsylvania, US

Coordinates: 40°31′00″N 77°22′59″W

- Township
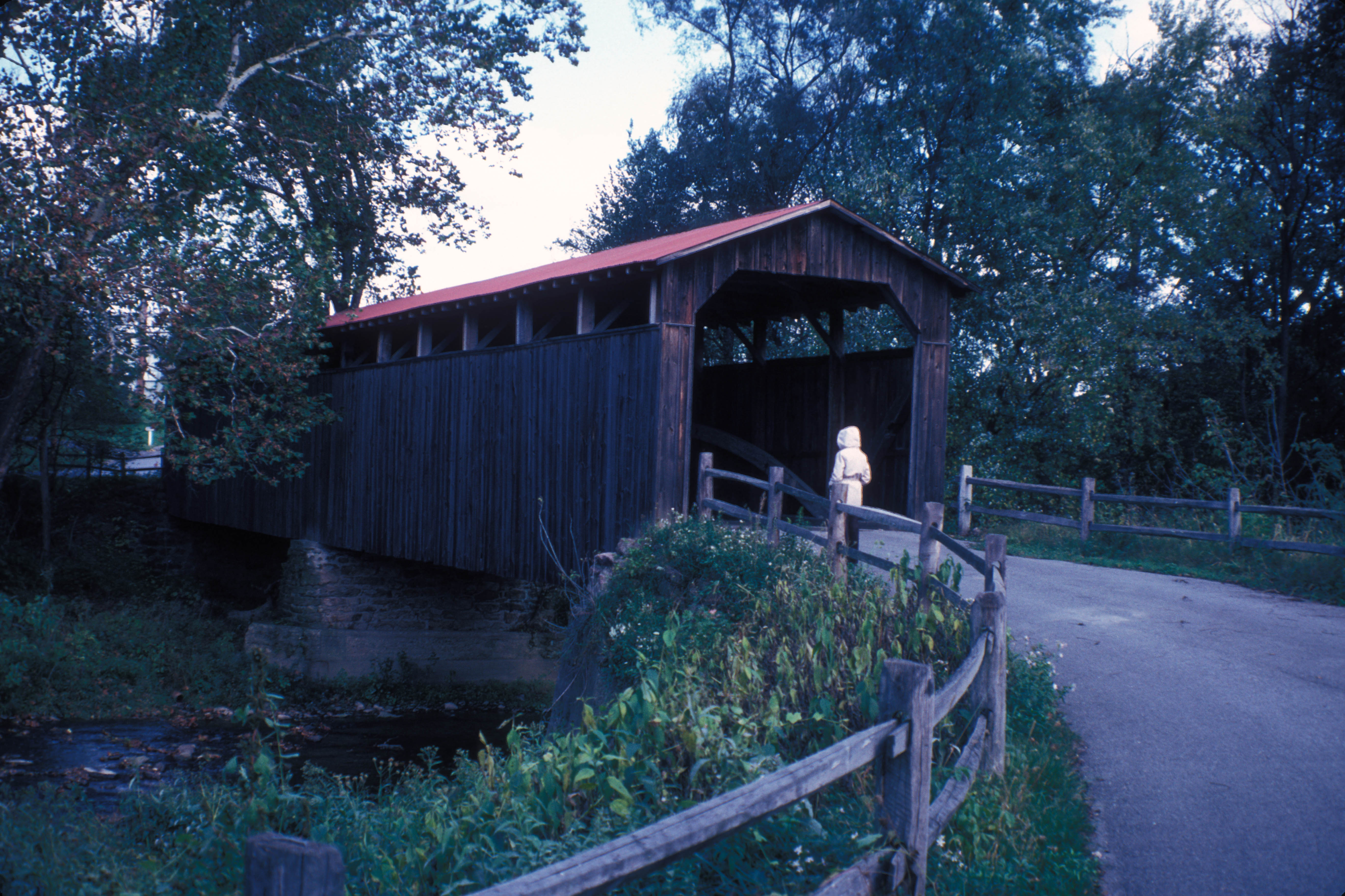
- Lehman's, Port Royal Covered Bridge

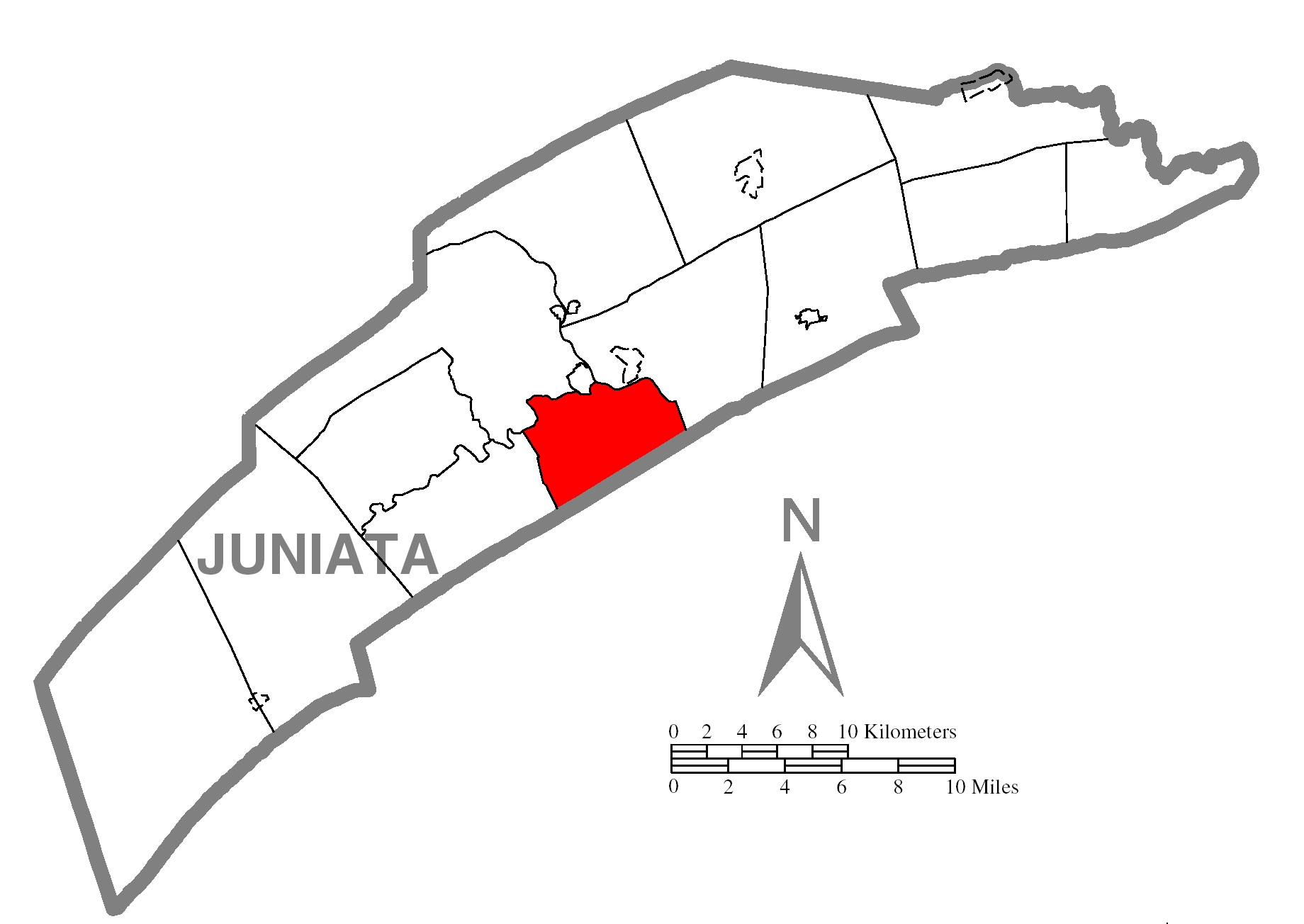
- Map of Juniata County, Pennsylvania highlighting Turbett Township

- Map of Juniata County, Pennsylvania
- Country: United States
- State: Pennsylvania
- County: Juniata
- Settled: 1755
- Incorporated: 1815

Area
  - Total: 16.52 sq mi (42.79 km^{2})
  - Land: 16.37 sq mi (42.41 km^{2})
  - Water: 0.15 sq mi (0.38 km^{2})

Population (2020)
  - Total: 977 ▼
  - Estimate (2022): 967
  - Density: 61.2/sq mi (23.63/km^{2})
- Time zone: UTC-5 (EST)
  - Summer (DST): UTC-4 (EDT)
- Area code: 717
- FIPS code: 42-067-77824

Turbett Township is a township in Juniata County, Pennsylvania, United States. The population was 977 at the 2020 census, a decline from the figure of 981 tabulated in 2010.

== History ==
The Lehman's, Port Royal Covered Bridge was listed on the National Register of Historic Places in 1979.

== Geography ==
According to the United States Census Bureau, the township has a total area of 16.5 square miles (42.8 km^{2}), of which 16.4 square miles (42.4 km^{2}) are land and 0.2 square miles (0.4 km^{2}), or 0.89%, are water. The Juniata River forms the northeastern border of the township.

Turbett Township is in south-central Juniata County and is bordered by Milford Township and the borough of Port Royal to the north, Walker Township to the north and east, Perry County to the south and Spruce Hill Township to the west. The southern boundary of the township follows the top of Tuscarora Mountain, part of the Ridge-and-Valley Appalachians.

The township includes the unincorporated communities of Old Port and Tuscarora.

== Demographics ==
Historical population
Census	Pop.	Note	%±
1850	1,399		—
1860	703		−49.7%
1870	714		1.6%
1880	747		4.6%
1890	693		−7.2%
1900	683		−1.4%
1910	648		−5.1%
1920	569		−12.2%
1930	520		−8.6%
1940	536		3.1%
1950	576		7.5%
1960	578		0.3%
1970	678		17.3%
1980	793		17.0%
1990	779		−1.8%
2000	819		5.1%
2010	981		19.8%
2020	977		−0.4%
2022 (est.)	967		−1.0%
U.S. Decennial Census

As of the census of 2000, there were 819 people, 308 households, and 251 families residing in the township. The population density was 49.9 people per square mile (19.3/km^{2}). There were 403 housing units at an average density of 24.5/sq mi (9.5/km^{2}). The racial makeup of the township was 99.39% White, 0.12% African American, 0.24% from other races, and 0.24% from two or more races. Hispanic or Latino of any race were 0.73% of the population.

There were 308 households, out of which 33.8% had children under the age of 18 living with them, 72.1% were married couples living together, 6.2% had a female householder with no husband present, and 18.5% were non-families. 17.2% of all households were made up of individuals, and 9.4% had someone living alone who was 65 years of age or older. The average household size was 2.66 and the average family size was 2.99.

In the township the population was spread out, with 25.2% under the age of 18, 8.4% from 18 to 24, 28.1% from 25 to 44, 26.0% from 45 to 64, and 12.3% who were 65 years of age or older. The median age was 38 years. For every 100 females there were 101.2 males. For every 100 females age 18 and over, there were 100.3 males.

The median income for a household in the township was $35,000, and the median income for a family was $40,492. Males had a median income of $28,095 versus $21,538 for females. The per capita income for the township was $14,905. About 6.1% of families and 8.8% of the population were below the poverty line, including 10.0% of those under age 18 and 27.5% of those age 65 or over.
