= Lehman's, Port Royal Covered Bridge =

- U.S. National Register of Historic Places
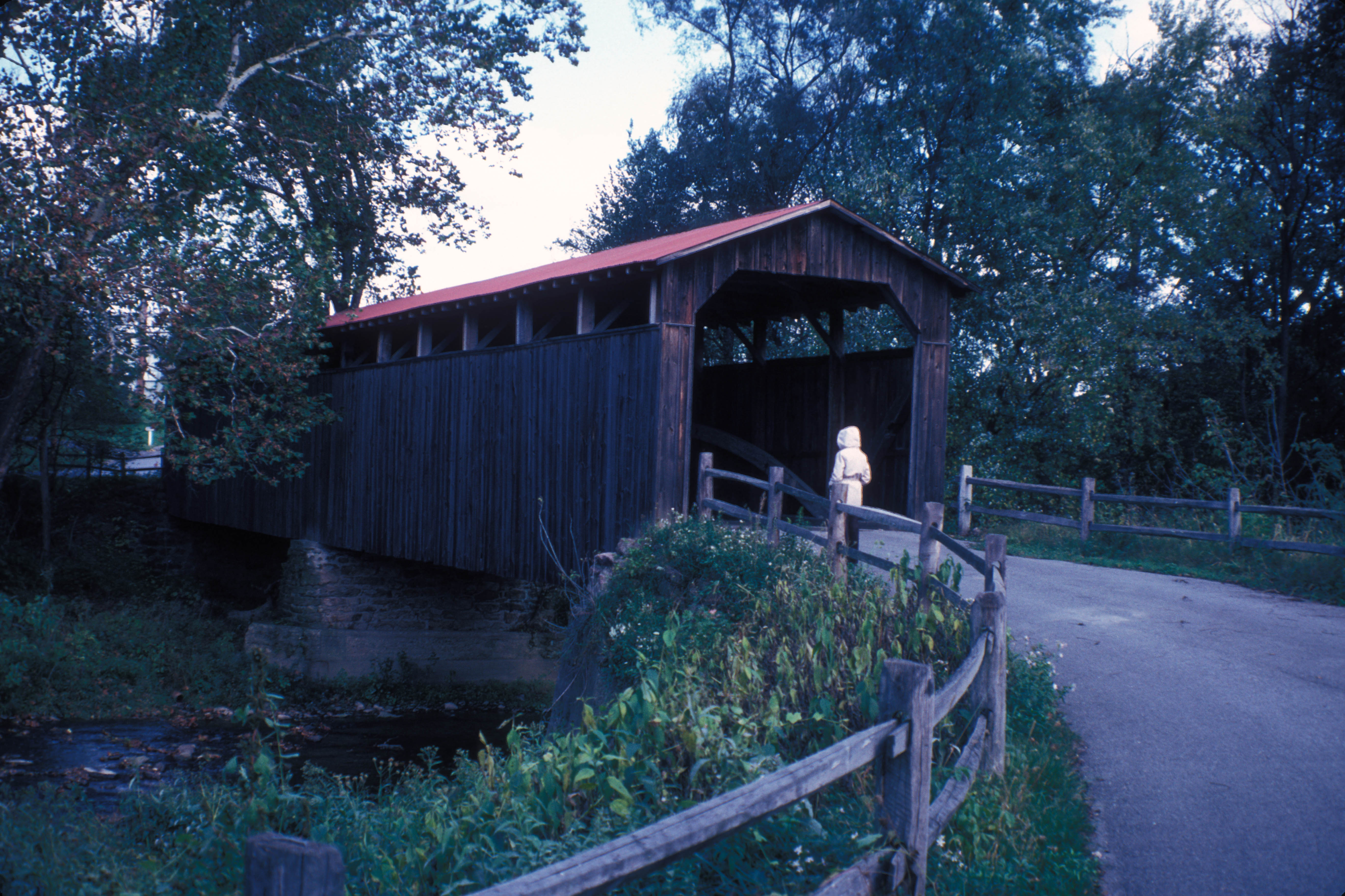
- Lehman's, Port Royal Covered Bridge

- Location within Pennsylvania Location within the United States
- Location: SW of Port Royal, Turbett Township, Pennsylvania
- Coordinates: 40°31′45″N 77°23′45″W
- Area: 0.1 acres (0.040 ha)
- Built: 1888
- Architectural style: Double Burr Arch
- MPS: Covered Bridges of Juniata and Snyder Counties TR
- NRHP reference No.: 79002248
- Added to NRHP: August 10, 1979

The Lehman's, Port Royal Covered Bridge is an historic covered bridge that is located near Port Royal in Turbett Township, Juniata County, Pennsylvania, United States.

It was listed on the National Register of Historic Places in 1979.

== History and architectural features ==
This historic structure is a Double Burr Arch truss bridge that was built in 1888. It measures 107-foot-long (33 m) and has vertical siding, windows at eave level, and a gable roof. It was damaged during Hurricane Agnes in 1972, and subsequently rebuilt.
