= WGJC =

Radio station in University Park, Pennsylvania

Coordinates: 40.808°N 77.941°W

Simulcasting WGRC Lewisburg

University Park, Pennsylvania; United States
- Broadcast area: State College, Pennsylvania
- Frequency: 97.1 MHz

Programming
- Format: Christian adult contemporary
- Affiliations: SRN News

Ownership
- Owner: Jim Loftus (Covenant Communications); (JFLIV, LLC)
- Operator: Salt and Light Media Ministries, Inc.
- Sister stations: WNLI, WLGJ, WFXS

History
- First air date: 1969 (as WQWK)
- Former call signs: WRSC-FM (1965–1969); WQWK (1969–2005); WOWY (2005–2023)
- Call sign meaning: similar to WGRC

Technical information
- Licensing authority: FCC
- Facility ID: 64850
- Class: A
- ERP: 2,000 watts
- HAAT: 123 meters (404 ft)

Links
- Public license information: Public file; LMS
- Webcast: Listen live
- Website: wgrc.com

WGJC (97.1 FM) is a radio station broadcasting from University Park, Pennsylvania. It operates as part of the network of Christian adult contemporary stations based out of WGRC in Lewisburg. The station's license is held by Jim Loftus of Covenant Communications, through licensee JFLIV, LLC, which also owns WFXS, WLGJ, and WNLI.

== History ==
On June 28, 2019, the then-WOWY began simulcasting on WHUN 1150 AM and WHUN-FM 103.5 Huntingdon and W249DD 97.7 FM Huntingdon and rebranded as "97.1 97.7 103.5 WOWY".

On August 24, 2021, WOWY, WHUN, and WHUN-FM completed their evolution from 1960s-1970s oldies to 1970s-1980s classic hits.

On December 30, 2022, it was announced the station would be simulcasted on WAPY within days.

On January 1, 2023, Covenant Communications consummated the purchase of WOWY and four sister stations from Seven Mountains Media for $1 million. On January 3, 2023, WOWY dropped its classic hits format (which moved to WAPY) and began stunting towards a new format. The station changed its call sign to WGJC on January 10, 2023.

On February 27, 2023, WGJC ended stunting and switched to a simulcast of contemporary Christian-formatted WGRC. WGRC's owner, Salt and Light Media Ministries, filed to acquire the station outright for $300,000 in May 2023.
