= WJUN (AM) =

Radio station in Mexico, Pennsylvania

Coordinates: 40°32′06″N 77°20′26″W

Simulcasts WBUS Centre Hall
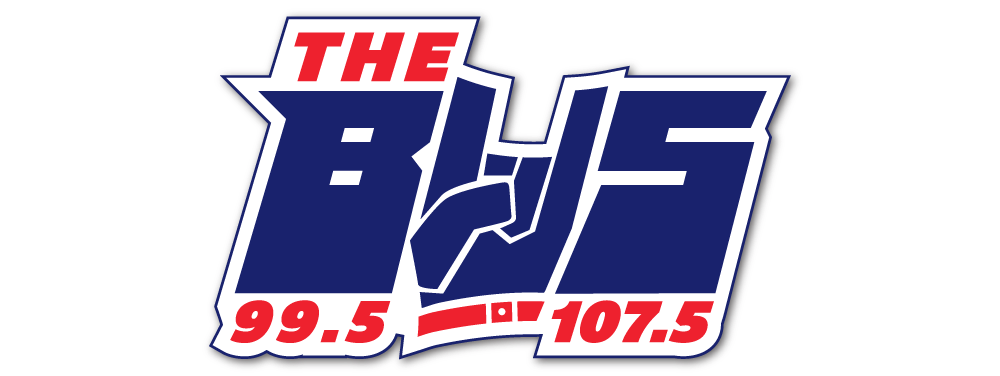
- Mexico, Pennsylvania; United States
- Broadcast area: Lewistown
- Frequency: 1220 kHz
- Branding: 99.5/107.5 The Bus

Programming
- Format: Classic rock
- Affiliations: United Stations Radio Networks; Pittsburgh Steelers Radio Network

Ownership
- Owner: Seven Mountains Media; (Southern Belle, LLC)
- Sister stations: WHUN; WIBF; WLUI; WMRF-FM; WNNA

History
- First air date: September 8, 1955

Technical information
- Licensing authority: FCC
- Facility ID: 62369
- Class: D
- Power: 1,000 watts day; 46 watts night
- Translator: 107.5 W298CR (Mexico)

Links
- Public license information: Public file; LMS
- Webcast: Listen Live
- Website: thebusrocks.com

WJUN (1220 kHz) is a radio station licensed to Mexico, Pennsylvania, United States, and serving the Lewistown, Pennsylvania, market. The station is owned by Seven Mountains Media, through licensee Southern Belle, LLC. The station broadcasts a classic rock format as it simulcasts WBUS in Centre Hall.

== History ==
The station was started by Lewistown Broadcasting under the name Juniata-Perry Broadcasting Co. WJUN signed on the air September 8, 1955.

In 1957, the power was increased to 1000 watts. In 1970, pre-sunrise operation at 500 watts was authorized. After the FCC authorized nighttime operation for many daytime AM stations, WJUN began nighttime coverage of sports events in 1986.

For the first 25 years, it ran a middle of the road format and block programming consisting of country (6 - 7 am, 11 - 12 AM), Gospel 12:45 - 1:00 PM + weekends), Easy listening (5 PM - Sign off), Polka (12:30 - 1:00 PM Sunday) plus paid religion weekdays, weekends. Add to that mix Phillies baseball, Mutual News and the local obituary column.

In 1977, the station was sold to Mid-State Broadcasting.

The FCC opened an FM allocation in 1986, which Mid-State applied for and was granted in 1987 for a Class A FM on 92.5. However they lacked the funds to construct the permit, so the station and CP were sold to Starview Media who signed on WJUN-FM in July 1988. WJUN soon began running a MOR/Oldies format, switching to ESPN Radio several years later.

On July 9, 2018, Starview Media sold WJUN and the translator construction permit to Kristin Cantrell's Seven Mountains Media for $70,500. The sale was completed on November 1, and WJUN started simulcasting oldies-formatted WLUI 670 AM Lewistown.

In June 2023, WJUN changed its format from a simulcast of oldies-formatted WLUI 670 AM Lewistown to a simulcast of classic rock-formatted WBUS 99.5 FM Centre Hall, branded as "99.5/107.5 The Bus".
