= WGRC =

Radio station based out of Lewisburg, Pennsylvania

Coordinates: 40.945°N 76.879°W

- Lewisburg, Pennsylvania; United States
- Broadcast area: Sunbury-Selinsgrove-Lewisburg, Pennsylvania
- Frequency: 91.3 MHz

Programming
- Format: Christian adult contemporary
- Affiliations: SRN News

Ownership
- Owner: Salt and Light Media Ministries, Inc.

History
- First air date: April 22, 1988
- Call sign meaning: "We're Growing in Christ"

Technical information
- Licensing authority: FCC
- Facility ID: 58717
- Class: A
- ERP: 5,000 watts
- HAAT: 98 meters (322 ft)
- Translator: See § Translators
- Repeater: See § Simulcasts

Links
- Public license information: Public file; LMS
- Webcast: Listen live
- Website: www.wgrc.com

WGRC (91.3 FM) is a Christian adult contemporary music formatted radio station located in Lewisburg, Pennsylvania. WGRC first signed on the air April 22, 1988.

== Simulcasts ==
In addition to its primary frequency, WGRC can be heard on several relay stations and translators in north central PA, and streaming on the internet.

Call sign	Frequency	City of license	ERP W	Class	FCC info
WCRG	90.7 FM	Williamsport, Pennsylvania	3,000	A	FCC (WCRG)
WJRC	90.9 FM	Lewistown, Pennsylvania	94	A	FCC (WJRC)
WZRG	91.9 FM	Kulpmont, Pennsylvania	1,450	A	FCC (WZRG)
WGJC	97.1 FM	University Park, Pennsylvania	2,000	A	FCC (WGJC)

=== Translators ===
Broadcast translators for WGRC
Call sign	Frequency	City of license	FID	ERP (W)	Class	FCC info
W296AP	107.1 FM	Williamsport, Pennsylvania	58718	5	D	LMS
W299AF	107.7 FM	Catawissa, Pennsylvania	58712	1	D	LMS

Broadcast translator for WJRC
Call sign	Frequency	City of license	FID	ERP (W)	Class	FCC info
W272EN	102.3 FM	State College, Pennsylvania	76831	10	D	LMS

Broadcast translator for WZRG
Call sign	Frequency	City of license	FID	ERP (W)	Class	FCC info
W284CB	104.7 FM	St. Clair, Pennsylvania	58714	150	D	LMS
