= WIBF (FM) =

Radio station in Mexico, Pennsylvania

- Mexico, Pennsylvania; United States
- Broadcast area: Lewistown; Mifflintown; Thompsontown; Newport
- Frequency: 92.5 MHz
- Branding: Bigfoot Country 92–106 FM

Programming
- Language: English
- Format: Country
- Affiliations: Bigfoot Country; Motor Racing Network

Ownership
- Owner: Seven Mountains Media; (Southern Belle, LLC)
- Sister stations: WHUN; WJUN; WLUI; WMRF-FM; WNNA

History
- First air date: July 4, 1989
- Former call signs: WJUN-FM (1989–2015)
- Call sign meaning: "Bigfoot"

Technical information
- Licensing authority: FCC
- Facility ID: 62367
- Class: A
- ERP: 310 watts
- HAAT: 433 meters (1,421 ft)
- Transmitter coordinates: 40.572306°N 77.513889°W

Links
- Public license information: Public file; LMS
- Webcast: Listen live
- Website: www.radiobigfoot.com

WIBF (92.5 MHz) is a radio station licensed to Mexico, Pennsylvania, United States, serving the Lewistown market. The station is owned by Seven Mountains Media, through licensee Southern Belle, LLC. The station broadcasts a country music format and part of a simulcast with WDBF of Mount Union. WIBF's transmitter is located near Granville Township.

WIBF is a member of the Motor Racing Network and provides live coverage of all NASCAR races. WIBF also features locally produced racing programs with news and results from Central Pennsylvania Sprint car racing.

== History ==
WIBF (then WJUN-FM) was granted a construction permit on November 16, 1988, and signed on-air on July 4, 1989.

In November 2014, Starview Media sold WJUN-FM and WLZS to Seven Mountains Media for $650,000. In January 2015, Seven Mountains began operating the stations under a time brokerage agreement until the sale was fully completed on April 17. Also that same month, Seven Mountains applied to relocate WJUN-FM and WMRF-FM to a new location and would operate with 310 watts at 433 meters.

On September 1, 2015, WJUN-FM changed their call letters to WIBF and rebranded as "Bigfoot Country", alongside WLZS and WHUN-FM.

== See also ==
- WDBF-FM
