= WLGJ =

Radio station in Philipsburg, Pennsylvania

Simulcast of WLEJ State College
- Philipsburg, Pennsylvania; United States
- Broadcast area: State College
- Frequency: 1260 kHz
- Branding: Bigfoot Country Legends 103.7 104.3

Programming
- Format: Classic country
- Affiliations: Compass Media Networks; United Stations Radio Networks; Penn State Nittany Lions

Ownership
- Owner: Seven Mountains Media; (Southern Belle, LLC)
- Sister stations: WBHV; WBUS; WFGE; WLEJ; WOWY; WZWW

History
- First air date: June 1, 1956
- Former call signs: WPHB (1956–2023)

Technical information
- Licensing authority: FCC
- Facility ID: 43879
- Class: D
- Power: 5,000 watts day; 34 watts night
- Transmitter coordinates: 40°53′39″N 78°11′51″W
- Translator: 104.3 W282CV (State College)

Links
- Public license information: Public file; LMS
- Webcast: Listen live
- Website: bigfootcountrylegends.com

WLGJ (1260 AM) is a commercial radio station in Philipsburg, Pennsylvania, United States, in Centre County. The station is owned by Seven Mountains Media, through licensee Southern Belle, LLC, and is broadcasting a classic country format, simulcasting WLEJ 1450 AM State College. WLGJ operates at a daytime power of 5,000 watts and a nighttime power of 34 watts.

== History ==
WLGJ first went on the air on June 1, 1956 as WPHB. The station was founded by Reverend William Emert, and for much of its early history, broadcast a religion-based format under the name Moshannon Valley Broadcasting, which it operated under for many years, though the owner principals would change over time. As AM stations were also issued FM licenses, WPHB began with an FM sister station, but this license would be forfeited and returned to the FCC by the end of the 1950s.

WPHB was acquired on July 16, 1982, by brothers C. Dean and Sheldon Sharpless, both of whom had worked for the station in varying capacities since its inception, but the corporate name was retained. Dean acted as the station's general manager, news director and engineer, while Sheldon served as promotions director, general sales manager and program director. Sheldon Sharpless had already been a part of WPHB's staff full-time for twenty years prior to the purchase. During this period, WPHB offered religion-based programming in addition to country music.

WPHB experienced its biggest growth while under ownership of the Sharpless brothers: seven years after their acquisition of WPHB, an FM station was returned to the air, taking the WPHB-FM call letters and assigned to the 105.9 MHz frequency at a power of 3,000 watts. (The FM station is now WQWK.)

Originally, the AM and FM stations simulcasted for about half of the broadcast day. For the remainder of the day, the AM carried religious and gospel-themed programming while the FM was music-intensive. In later years, after being sold to Magnum Broadcasting, the FM concentrated on State College as "105.9 The Buzz", WUBZ, an alternative Rock station.

WPHB continued to serve the Philipsburg area playing classic country music, with DJs Sheldon Sharpless, CJ Daniels, Ken Owens from 2001-2005 & Jerry Pollock replacing Ken Owens in late 2005.

Magnum Broadcasting, Inc. acquired the radio station in November 2004. They continued with the same programming.

As of September 2009, WPHB played a mix of Country and Americana music. In the morning, Jerry Pollock played the classic country sound that WPHB had been known for over the years. With the departure of Sheldon Sharpless in the early summer of 2010, Jerry and Mase Daniels shared the airwaves daily playing Classic Country and Americana for Centre County and the surrounding areas

On April 24, 2020, Twilight Broadcasting closed on the purchase of WPHB and the construction permit for translator W281CB from Magnum Broadcasting, at a price of $95,000. In early May 2020, WPHB changed its format from country to classic hits, branded as "1260 PHB".

On May 27, 2021, All Access reported that Twilight Broadcasting was in the process of selling WPHB and translator W281CB to Lightner Communications, LLC for $77,500, $17,500 less than what Twilight originally paid. The sale was consummated on October 29, 2021.

On February 28, 2022, the station began stunting with a loop of a heartbeat monitor sound effect, and redirecting listeners to WTRN. On March 2, Philipsburg translator W281CB (104.1 FM) moved to State College, changed frequencies to 104.3 FM (and subsequently became W282CV), as it prepared to launch a new format on March 7; the station began stunting with multiple formats “that will be unlike any other in the history of Happy Valley”, such as "The Toad" (country music, to compete with WFGE), "Unhappy 104" (classic hits, to compete with WAPY), "Slow Rock 104" (rock music, to compete with WQCK), "Giger 24/7" (sports talk), "Chill 104" (oldies), "Red Hot 104" (hip hop), and "Polkamania 104". On March 7, WPHB began simulcasting WYUP's adult hits format, branded as "107.1 & 104.3 Jack FM".

On December 30, 2022, it was announced that the station would flip to classic country as "Bigfoot Legends" within days.

On January 3, 2023, WPHB switched from a simulcast of adult hits-formatted WYUP 1400 AM Loretto to a simulcast of classic country-formatted WQWK (now WLEJ) 1450 AM State College.

In March 2023, Covenant Communications swapped WRSC-FM to Lightner Communications in exchange for WPHB, translator W282CV, and $100,000 to be paid in $1000 increments over 100 months. The sale was completed on June 30.

On October 19, 2023, WPBH changed its call sign to WLGJ.

In May 2024, Covenant Communications sold WLGJ and WHUN-FM to Seven Mountains Media for $75,000. The sale was completed on August 15, 2024.

== Previous logos ==
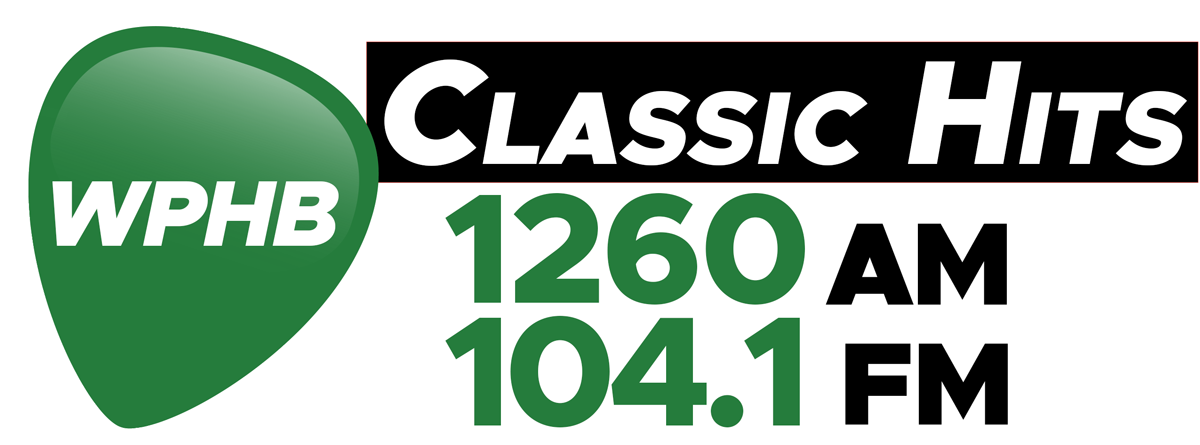
