= Fermanagh Township, Juniata County, Pennsylvania =

Township in Pennsylvania, US

Coordinates: 40°37′00″N 77°24′59″W

Fermanagh Township, Pennsylvania
- Township
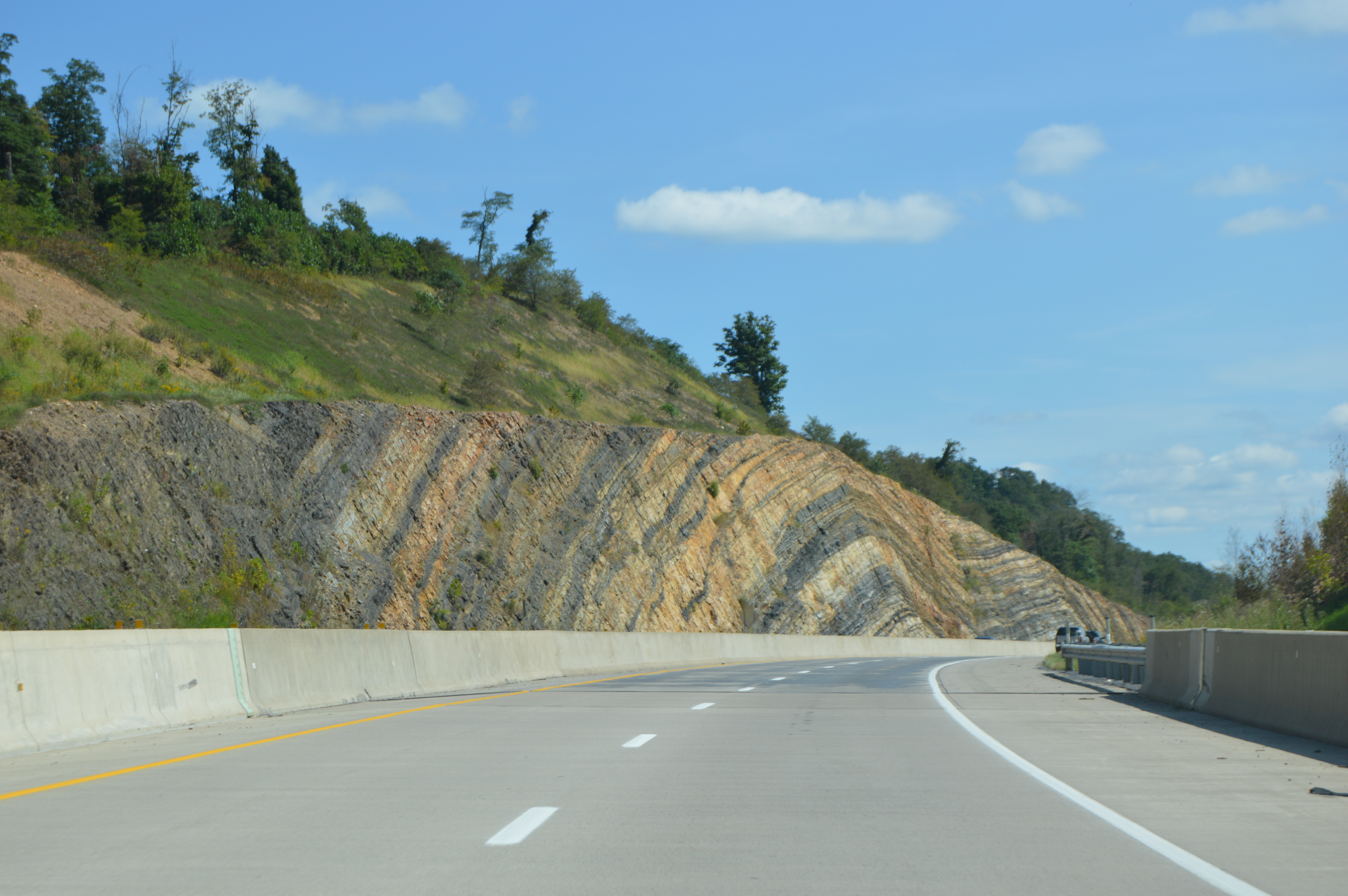
- A road cut along U.S. Route 322 with visible anticline rock strata

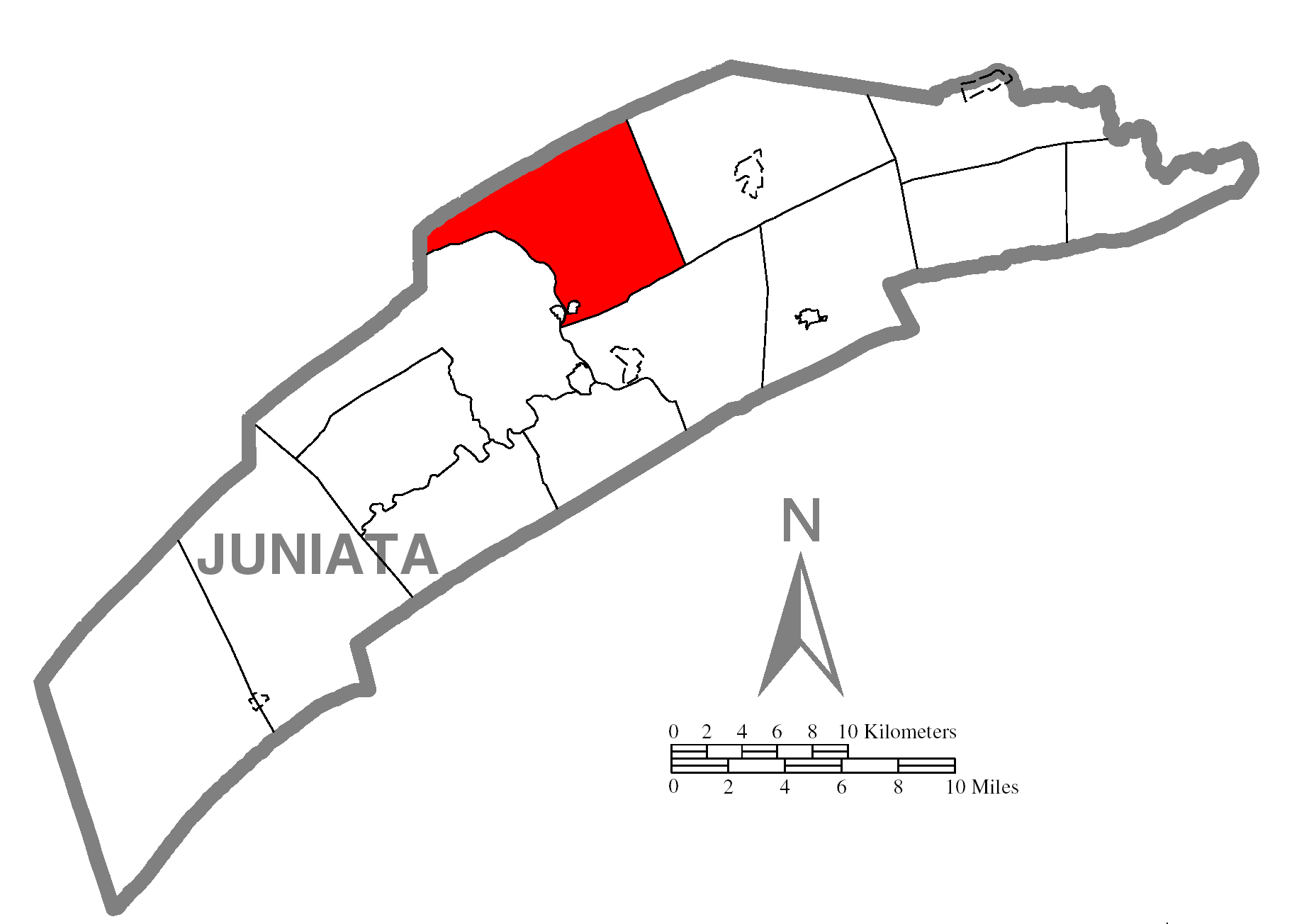
- Map of Juniata County, Pennsylvania highlighting Fermanagh Township

- Map of Juniata County, Pennsylvania
- Country: United States
- State: Pennsylvania
- County: Juniata
- Settled: 1754
- Incorporated: 1755

Area
  - Total: 32.49 sq mi (84.15 km^{2})
  - Land: 32.05 sq mi (83.00 km^{2})
  - Water: 0.44 sq mi (1.15 km^{2})

Population (2020)
  - Total: 2,865 ▲
  - Estimate (2022): 2,854
  - Density: 89.0/sq mi (34.36/km^{2})
- Time zone: UTC-5 (EST)
  - Summer (DST): UTC-4 (EDT)
- ZIP code: 17059
- Area code: 717
- FIPS code: 42-067-25648
- Website: https://fermanaghtwp.com/

Fermanagh Township is a township in Juniata County, Pennsylvania, United States. The population was 2,865 at the 2020 census, an increase over the figure of 2,811 tabulated in 2010.

The township was named after County Fermanagh in Ireland.

== Geography ==
According to the United States Census Bureau, the township has a total area of 32.5 square miles (84.1 km^{2}), of which 32.0 square miles (83.0 km^{2}) are land and 0.46 square miles (1.2 km^{2}), or 1.37%, are water.

Fermanagh Township is bordered by Mifflin County to the north, Fayette Township to the east and Walker Township to the south. The Juniata River forms the western and southern borders with Milford Township. The borough of Mifflintown, a separate municipality, lies along the river in the southwestern corner of the township. Unincorporated communities in the township include Macedonia, Arch Rock, Jericho Mills, and Cuba Mills.

Shade Mountain forms the northern border of the township, ending at the Lewistown Narrows, a water gap traversed by the Juniata River. U.S. Routes 22 and 322, together forming a four-lane expressway, travels through the gap westward to Lewistown and crosses Fermanagh Township, passing to the east of Mifflintown and leading southeast to Thompsontown. Pennsylvania Route 35 runs through the southern part of the township, coming from the west out of Mifflintown and leading east to McAlisterville.

== Demographics ==
Historical population
Census	Pop.	Note	%±
1850	887		—
1860	1,101		24.1%
1870	993		−9.8%
1880	1,114		12.2%
1890	968		−13.1%
1900	850		−12.2%
1910	825		−2.9%
1920	817		−1.0%
1930	1,076		31.7%
1940	1,161		7.9%
1950	1,297		11.7%
1960	1,441		11.1%
1970	1,855		28.7%
1980	2,097		13.0%
1990	2,249		7.2%
2000	2,544		13.1%
2010	2,811		10.5%
2020	2,865		1.9%
2022 (est.)	2,854		−0.4%
U.S. Decennial Census

As of the census of 2000, there were 2,544 people, 971 households, and 728 families residing in the township. The population density was 79.2 inhabitants per square mile (30.6/km^{2}). There were 1,098 housing units at an average density of 34.2 per square mile (13.2/km^{2}). The racial makeup of the township was 98.86% White, 0.31% African American, 0.63% Asian, and 0.20% from two or more races. Hispanic or Latino of any race were 0.55% of the population.

There were 971 households, out of which 30.4% had children under the age of 18 living with them, 65.6% were married couples living together, 6.0% had a female householder with no husband present, and 25.0% were non-families. 21.8% of all households were made up of individuals, and 11.8% had someone living alone who was 65 years of age or older. The average household size was 2.44 and the average family size was 2.84.

In the township the population was spread out, with 21.9% under the age of 18, 5.5% from 18 to 24, 25.0% from 25 to 44, 25.6% from 45 to 64, and 22.1% who were 65 years of age or older. The median age was 44 years. For every 100 females, there were 88.9 males. For every 100 females age 18 and over, there were 84.7 males.

The median income for a household in the township was $34,643, and the median income for a family was $42,232. Males had a median income of $32,176 versus $20,417 for females. The per capita income for the township was $17,315. About 7.4% of families and 8.9% of the population were below the poverty line, including 11.0% of those under age 18 and 6.0% of those age 65 or over.
