= WDBF-FM =

Radio station in Mount Union, Pennsylvania

Simulcasts WIBF Mexico
- Mount Union, Pennsylvania; United States
- Broadcast area: Altoona; Huntingdon
- Frequency: 106.3 MHz
- Branding: Bigfoot Country 92–106 FM

Programming
- Format: Country
- Affiliations: Compass Media Networks

Ownership
- Owner: Seven Mountains Media; (Southern Belle, LLC)
- Sister stations: WALY; WFBG; WFGY; WQWY; WRKY-FM; WTNA

History
- First air date: March 30, 1992
- Former call signs: WQHG (1991–2001); WWZB (2001–2002); WWLY (2002–2006); WSGY (2006); WFZY (2006–2008); WBSS (2008–2009); WHUN-FM (2009–2015)
- Call sign meaning: "Bigfoot"

Technical information
- Licensing authority: FCC
- Facility ID: 28132
- Class: A
- ERP: 120 watts
- HAAT: 439 meters (1,440 ft)
- Transmitter coordinates: 40°24′53″N 77°54′13″W

Links
- Public license information: Public file; LMS
- Webcast: Listen live
- Website: www.radiobigfoot.com

WDBF-FM (106.3 MHz) is a radio station licensed to Mount Union, Pennsylvania and serving parts of Altoona and Huntingdon. It is owned by Seven Mountains Media, through licensee Southern Belle, LLC and is part of a simulcast of WIBF of Mexico, Pennsylvania. WDBF's transmitter is located in Huntingdon County.

Although also owned by Seven Mountains Media, WIBF and WDBF do not feature the same programming as the network of Bigfoot Country stations based in Selinsgrove.

== History ==
=== History of 106.3 FM ===
A station at 106.3 FM first went on the air as the sister FM to WHUN (1150 AM) featuring simulcast broadcast. When the AM signed off at local sunset listeners were invited to switch to 106.3 FM and continuing listening until midnight. In 1976 the FM became WRLR, Raystown Lake Radio and featured a beautiful music format. Heavy rotation of instrumental versions of popular songs, with a few vocals each hour. WHUN AM first went on the air in March 1947 at 1400 AM with 250 watts, then increased power to 1,000 watts. WHUN AM then switched to 1150 AM a regional signal and operates at 5,000 watts daytime and has decreased pre and post sunset power levels non-directional.

In early 1987, WRLR switched from 106.3 to 103.5 FM in order to increase its coverage area from a new tower location on Williamsburg Mountain, leaving the old frequency vacant.

=== History of WDBF-FM ===
In 1992, Mary Lou Maierhofer of Altoona applied for and was granted the license to operate at 106.3 FM in Huntingdon. The station with the call letters WQHG went on the air from the studio location of a now-dark directional daytime-only AM radio station, WQRO (AM 1080, which had signed on the air on December 18, 1978 and failed by 1987) utilizing the old WQRO studios along Fairgrounds Road.

WQHG also acquired the old transmitter location of WRLR on Stone Creek Ridge. One remaining tower from the old WQRO was used as an STL facility for WQHG to send its signal to the transmitter site.

In 1998, Maierhofer agreed to sell the station to Warren Diggins and his Millennium Broadcasting, who switched the format from adult contemporary to country under the theme Bear Country. Diggins' group then sold the station to Megahertz Licenses, a subsidiary of Forever Broadcasting in Altoona, Pennsylvania, for $620,000 in 2002.

Three years after the sale, Megahertz Licenses successfully petitioned the FCC for a change in the station's community of license from Huntingdon to Mount Union.

On September 21, 2009, WBSS changed their call letters to WHUN-FM and flipped from classic rock (simulcasting WBUS 93.7 FM) to oldies, branded as "Hunny 106".

On September 1, 2015, WHUN-FM dropped the oldies format in favor of a country station known as "Bigfoot Country", along with WIBF and WZBF. This followed the consummation of the sale of WHUN-FM and sister station WHUN by Forever Media to Seven Mountains Media, at a purchase price of $100,000. On September 15, WHUN-FM changed their call letters to WDBF-FM, to go with the new branding.

== See also ==
- WIBF (FM)
