= WQWK (FM) =

Radio station in State College, Pennsylvania

- Philipsburg, Pennsylvania; United States
- Broadcast area: State College, Pennsylvania
- Frequency: 105.9 MHz
- Branding: QWiK Rock 105.9

Programming
- Format: Active rock

Ownership
- Owner: Jeffry and Mark Schlesinger; (Schlesinger Communications, Inc.)

History
- First air date: 1989 (as WPHB-FM)
- Former call signs: WPHB-FM (1988–1996); WUBZ-FM (1996–2006); WJOW (2006–2009); WQCK (2009–2023)
- Call sign meaning: W QWiK

Technical information
- Licensing authority: FCC
- Facility ID: 43880
- Class: A
- ERP: 710 watts
- HAAT: 290 meters
- Transmitter coordinates: 40°47′34.00″N 78°10′29.00″W

Links
- Public license information: Public file; LMS
- Webcast: Listen Live
- Website: 1059qwikrock.com

WQWK (105.9 MHz) is an active rock FM radio station broadcasting in State College, Pennsylvania, United States. It is known as QWIK Rock. The station, owned by Jeffry and Mark Schlesinger, through licensee Schlesinger Communications, Inc., was founded by brothers C. Dean & Sheldon Sharpless, doing business as Moshannon Valley Broadcasting. The current incarnation was formed after WQWK abandoned its active rock format for talk radio in 2008. On April 21, 2023, the station recaptured the WQWK call sign after a shakeup in the market which made it available. WQWK's tower is located in Sandy Ridge, south of Philipsburg.

== Early years: as WPHB-FM ==
This station was originally known as WPHB-FM, first signing on the air in 1989 from the studios of its co-owned AM station with the WPHB call sign. Both stations simulcast a classic country music format for approximately half of the broadcast day, with break-aways during the daytime hours for WPHB's more Christian-based programming.

In 1996, the Sharpless family sold both stations to local residents Cliff and Laura Mack, who changed the format of the FM station to modern rock. The station also adopted the new call sign WUBZ-FM and the "105.9 The Buzz" moniker. In 1999, the station moved its tower to provide a city-grade signal in State College. WPHB and WUBZ-FM were then sold a few years later to Magnum Broadcasting, which moved WUBZ-FM's studios to State College. WPHB, which was more of a local station serving Philipsburg and the Moshannon Valley almost exclusively, stayed in Philipsburg, where it remains today.

In 2006, WUBZ-FM changed its call sign to WJOW and switched to a country format branded as "Joe FM". Magnum Broadcasting's previously titled "106.9 The Surge", which broadcast to Renovo and Lock Haven, changed in February 2007 to simulcast "Joe FM" as well. Another change is that "Joe FM" started to mix in more Southern and classic rock hits with the country music to differentiate themselves from their main competitor in the State College area, Froggy 101. "Rock N' Country" was their motto.

On September 3, 2009, WJOW changed its format to active rock, branded as "QWiK Rock 105.9" under the WQCK call sign. The line-up featured Todd and Troy Craig in the Morning (Troy was the former PD from the defunct 103.1 QWK Rock), 6am - 10am, Drew Shannon 10am - 3pm, AJ 3pm - 7pm, Andy Robb 7pm - midnight and Glennie B 12am - 6am.

== History of QWK Rock ==
After leaving the marketplace when being shut down at 103.1 FM by Forever Broadcasting, the active rock format, branded as "Qwik Rock", returned to the airwaves on September 3, 2009, at 5 p.m. on a frequency owned by Magnum Broadcasting Inc. The station seeks to recreate the sound of the original Qwik Rock from years gone by and it even features some of the names and voices from QWK 103.1.

"Quick Radio" began circa 1969 as an underground/progressive rock station. The first sign that its format was about to change may have been toward the end of 1970, when it held a call-in contest entitled "Quick Radio Sells Out!"

In 1989, WQWK (then broadcasting on 96.7 FM with a Top 40/CHR format) had a frequency switch to 97.1 FM, while also relocating its tower from the station's studios on Clearview Avenue to a new site near Scotia Game Lands. Shortly thereafter, the station's format flipped to classic rock, its on-air name changed to 97QWK ("97-Quick"), and the slogan changed to become "Lion Country's Home of Rock n' Roll". At the time, the station was well known for morning shock jocks Tom Ragan and Karen Pingar aka "Tom & Karen in the Morning". Ragan and Pignar left the station in the middle of 1993's spring sweeps period to take a job with WGR in Buffalo. Ragan and Pingar were then replaced by Ed Wenck and Steve Biddle ("Wenck & Biddle in the Morning").

In 1993, then-WQWK owner Tele-Media Broadcasting acquired WIYQ (now WRKW) in Ebensburg from the Allegheny Mountain Network. Tele-Media dropped WIYQ's satellite-delivered oldies format to simulcast WQWK's programming over WIYQ, which took the call sign WQKK. The new duo operated under the QWK Rock ("Quick Rock") moniker. Today, classic rock is available with WBUS.

In 2004, WQWK moved to 98.7 FM.

In 2006, WQWK moved to 103.1 FM, which was previously held by WBHV-FM.

When Forever Broadcasting took the station off-air in favor of talk radio, the WQWK call sign was moved to Forever's ESPN 1450, most likely just in case they ever decided to resurrect the station at a later date, but Magnum decided they could relaunch the station without its heritage calls and so one month to the day after the station went silent, it was reborn in a new spot on the dial.

Effective August 31, 2020, Magnum Broadcasting sold WQCK, two sister stations, and a translator to Jeffry and Mark Schlesinger's Schlesinger Communications, Inc. for $1.05 million.

In September 2022, WQCK-FM1 was surrendered to the FCC

On April 21, 2023, the station reinstated the WQWK call sign as it had become available after a market shakeup whereby Seven Mountains Media, who'd acquired the former Forever Broadcasting stations, ceased use of it in the market.
