= WRSC-FM =

Radio station in Bellefonte–State College, Pennsylvania

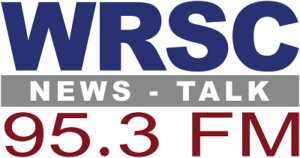
- Bellefonte, Pennsylvania; United States
- Broadcast area: State College
- Frequency: 95.3 MHz
- Branding: 95.3 WRSC

Programming
- Format: News/talk
- Affiliations: Fox News Radio; Compass Media Networks; Premiere Networks; Radio America; Salem Radio Network; Westwood One; Penguins Radio Network

Ownership
- Owner: Matt Lightner; (Lightner Communications LLC)

History
- First air date: September 15, 1986; 39 years ago
- Former call signs: WWZW (1986); WZWW (1986–2023)
- Call sign meaning: "Radio State College"

Technical information
- Licensing authority: FCC
- Facility ID: 64572
- Class: A
- ERP: 790 watts
- HAAT: 194 meters (636 ft)
- Transmitter coordinates: 40°53′35.2″N 77°51′47.0″W

Links
- Public license information: Public file; LMS
- Webcast: Listen live
- Website: www.lightnercommunications.com/wrsc/

WRSC-FM (95.3 MHz) is a radio station licensed to Bellefonte, Pennsylvania, serving the State College area. It currently airs a news/talk format.

== History ==
When State College's radio station formats shuffled in 2004, the then-WZWW was one of the few FM stations that maintained its frequency. When the bars in State College tried to promote their respective businesses, they were confused as to which stations to hire.

On September 4, 2020, at 2 PM, after teasing a relaunch with construction noises between songs the previous day, WZWW shifted from adult contemporary to hot adult contemporary, keeping the "3WZ" name. The first song after the relaunch was "Good as Hell" by Lizzo.

On December 20, 2022, it was announced that the format and branding would move to WMAJ within the following days and would be replaced by the news/talk format heard on WRSC. On January 2, 2023, the station changed its call sign to WRSC-FM. On January 3, 2023, WRSC-FM changed its format to news/talk. Seven Mountains Media exited the spoken-word format as a result. The station was programmed by Lightner Communications as a result of swapping WPHB to Covenant Communications in exchange for WRSC-FM.

== HD radio ==
On May 8, 2022, the station's third HD subchannel, simulcast on translator W268BB (101.5 FM), launched with a loop of "Kernkraft 400" by Zombie Nation as "We Are 101.5", the branding and stunt a reference to the association of the song with the Penn State Nittany Lions football team and the university's "We Are Penn State" chants, promoting the launch of a new format at noon on May 13. At the promised time, WZWW-HD3 launched an urban contemporary format, branded as "Loud 101.5", with the first song being "First Class" by Jack Harlow. As of the 'Great Seven Mountains Media Station Shuffle of 2023', WRSC no longer operates an HD Radio signal. This HD 3 signal was moved to WBUS FM, where the Loud Radio signal resides to this day.
