= WHUN (AM) =

Radio station in Huntingdon, Pennsylvania

Simulcast of WOWY State College
- Huntingdon, Pennsylvania; United States
- Broadcast area: Mount Union–Lewistown
- Frequency: 1150 kHz
- Branding: 97.7 103.1 103.5 WOWY

Programming
- Format: Classic hits
- Affiliations: United Stations Radio Networks; Penn State Nittany Lions

Ownership
- Owner: Seven Mountains Media; (Southern Belle, LLC)
- Sister stations: WIBF; WJUN; WLUI; WMRF-FM; WNNA

History
- First air date: 1947
- Former call signs: WHUN (1947–2010); WLLI (2010–2013)
- Call sign meaning: Huntingdon

Technical information
- Licensing authority: FCC
- Facility ID: 28131
- Class: D
- Power: 1,000 watts day 36 watts night
- Transmitter coordinates: 40°27′18″N 77°58′50″W
- Translator: see below
- Repeater: see below

Links
- Public license information: Public file; LMS
- Webcast: Listen live
- Website: wowyonline.com

WHUN (1150 kHz) is a classic hits AM radio station licensed to Huntingdon, Pennsylvania, United States, serving Mount Union and Lewistown. Owned by Seven Mountains Media, the broadcast license has been held by Southern Belle, LLC.

On June 28, 2018, the station became known as "97.7 103.1 103.5 WOWY, simulcasting with WOWY (103.1 FM) in State College and WHUN-FM (103.5) in Huntingdon.

== History ==
WHUN began in 1947. Among its original personnel was Cary H. Simpson, who assisted in building the station and would later build a series of his own stations in central and northern Pennsylvania.

For many years, WHUN's ownership would be relatively unchanged, with the station and its FM sister, WLAK (103.5 FM), which would come on the air years later, staying in the Biddle and McMeen families until the stations were sold in the mid-1990s to BARDCOM of Mount Union, Pa. From 1994-2002, WHUN was the sister station of WXMJ 99.5 FM (Majic 99). Both stations were sold to Forever Broadcasting in 2002.

The station's call sign was changed to WLLI on February 8, 2010, and from 2010 to 2012, the station was a country music station known as Willy AM 1150. On December 31, 2012, the format changed to sports radio, and the station became known as ESPN Radio 1150. The call sign was changed back to WHUN on January 2, 2013.

Effective September 1, 2015, Forever Broadcasting sold WHUN and sister station WHUN-FM (106.3 FM) to Seven Mountains Media for $100,000.

In 2016, WHUN’s format changed from sports to a simulcast of classic hits-formatted WHUN-FM (103.5 FM).

On June 28, 2019, WHUN and WHUN-FM switched to a simulcast of oldies station WOWY 97.1 FM University Park.

On August 24, 2021, WOWY, WHUN, and WHUN-FM completed their evolution from 1960s to 1970s oldies to classic hits from the 1970s to 1980s.

== Repeaters ==
Call sign	Frequency	City of license	Facility ID	Class	ERP (W)	Height (m (ft))	Transmitter coordinates	Former call signs
WHUN-FM	103.5 FM	Huntingdon, Pennsylvania	42135	A	160	435 meters (1,427 ft)	40°29′51″N 78°8′0″W	WLAK (1989–2015)

Broadcast translator for WHUN (AM)
Call sign	Frequency	City of license	FID	ERP (W)	HAAT	Class	Transmitter coordinates	FCC info
W249DD	97.7 FM	Huntingdon, Pennsylvania	139876	108	412 m (1,352 ft)	D	40°24′52″N 77°54′10″W	LMS
