= WBUS (FM) =

Radio station in Centre Hall, Pennsylvania

Coordinates: 40.753°N 77.754°W

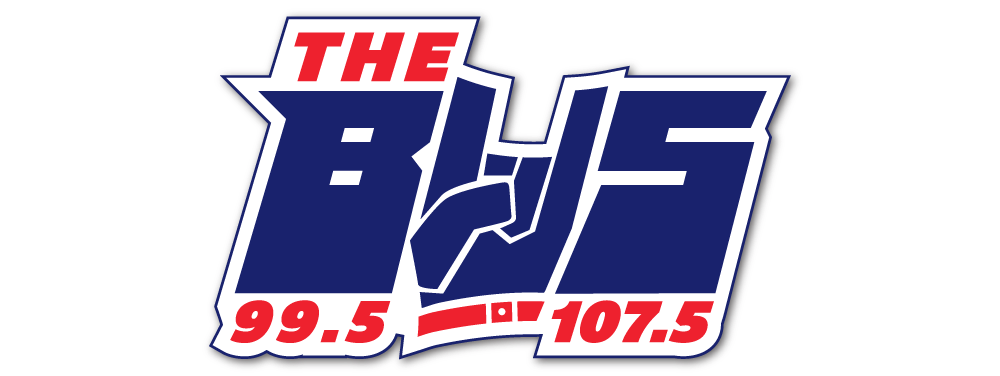
- Centre Hall, Pennsylvania; United States
- Broadcast area: State College, Pennsylvania
- Frequency: 99.5 MHz (HD Radio)
- Branding: 99.5/107.5 The Bus

Programming
- Format: Classic rock
- Subchannels: HD1: WBUS-FM analog; HD2: Silent; HD3: Loud 101.5 (Urban contemporary)
- Affiliations: Compass Media Networks; United Stations Radio Networks; Penn State Sports Network; Pittsburgh Steelers Audio Network

Ownership
- Owner: Seven Mountains Media; (Southern Belle Media Family, LLC)
- Sister stations: WBHV; WFGE; WLEJ; WLGJ; WOWY; WZWW

History
- First air date: May 24, 1989 (as WXMJ)
- Former call signs: WXMJ (1988–2005); WXOT (2005–2006); WLTS (2006–2007); WMAJ-FM (2007–2019)
- Call sign meaning: The Bus

Technical information
- Licensing authority: FCC
- Facility ID: 3956
- Class: B1
- ERP: 850 watts
- HAAT: 417 meters (1,368 ft)
- Translator: HD3: 101.5 W268BB (State College) FM: 102.3 W272EN (State College)
- Repeater: 1220 WJUN (Mexico)

Links
- Public license information: Public file; LMS
- Webcast: Listen live
- Website: thebusrocks.com; HD3: loudradiopa.com

WBUS (99.5 MHz) is a radio station licensed to Centre Hall, Pennsylvania, United States, serving the State College area.

== History ==
Originally on 94.5, the WLTS call sign and format moved to 99.5 while 94.5 became WBHV-FM. 99.5 was originally a class A station licensed to the town of Mount Union using the call sign WXMJ (Magic 99.5). When purchased by Forever Broadcasting, the company applied for and was granted a change in the city of license to Centre Hall along with a change to a class B1 (25,000 watts equivalent) status. The transmitter site was moved to Tussey Mountain on the south side of State College.

On January 22, 2019, WMAJ-FM's CHR format moved to WBUS 93.7 FM Boalsburg, swapping frequencies with classic rock-formatted "The Bus" and the station assuming the WBUS call sign.

It was announced on October 12, 2022, that Forever Media was selling 34 stations, including WBUS and five other sister stations, to State College-based Seven Mountains Media for $17.3 million. The deal closed on January 1, 2023.
