= WBHV (AM) =

Radio station in State College, Pennsylvania

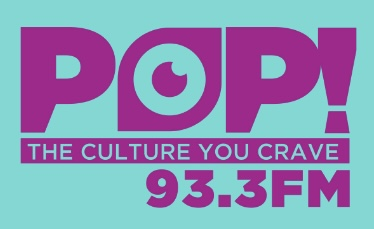
- State College, Pennsylvania; United States
- Frequency: 1390 kHz
- Branding: Pop! Radio 93.3

Programming
- Format: Contemporary hit radio
- Affiliations: Compass Media Networks; Premiere Networks; Penn State Nittany Lions

Ownership
- Owner: Seven Mountains Media; (Southern Belle Media Family, LLC)
- Sister stations: WBUS; WFGE; WLEJ; WLGJ; WOWY; WZWW

History
- First air date: 1961
- Former call signs: WRSC (1961–2023)

Technical information
- Licensing authority: FCC
- Facility ID: 64849
- Class: B
- Power: 2,000 watts (day); 1,000 watts (night)
- Transmitter coordinates: 40°48′30″N 77°56′32″W
- Translator: 93.3 W227DV (State College)

Links
- Public license information: Public file; LMS
- Webcast: Listen live
- Website: itspopradio.com

WBHV (1390 kHz) is a contemporary hit radio station in State College, Pennsylvania, United States, with a power of 2,000 watts daytime, and 1,000 watts nighttime.

== History ==
The then-WRSC moved its talk programming on 1390 AM to 103.1 FM on August 3, 2009, as "Newsradio 103 WRSC". The AM station switched to a business news/talk format branded as "Money Talk 1390".

On November 18, 2013, WRSC changed its format to sports radio, branded "1390 The Fanatic".

On May 20, 2015, WRSC flipped back to news/talk as "Newsradio 1390 WRSC".

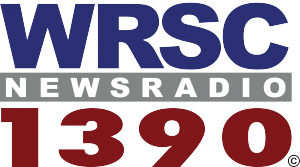
Logo before translator sign on

It was announced on October 12, 2022, that Forever Media was selling 34 stations and 12 translators, including WRSC and five other sister stations, to State College-based Seven Mountains Media for $17.375 million. The deal closed on January 1, 2023.

On December 30, 2022, it was announced that the station would change its format to top 40, branded as "Pop Radio" within days. The talk format would move to WRSC-FM (95.3) on January 4, 2023. On March 26, 2023, the call sign was changed to WBHV.
