= WLEJ (AM) =

Radio station in State College, Pennsylvania

- State College, Pennsylvania; United States
- Frequency: 1450 kHz
- Branding: Bigfoot Country Legends 103.7 104.3

Programming
- Format: Classic country
- Affiliations: Compass Media Networks; United Stations Radio Networks; Penn State Nittany Lions

Ownership
- Owner: Seven Mountains Media; (Southern Belle Media Family, LLC)
- Sister stations: WBHV; WBUS; WFGE; WLGJ; WOWY; WZWW

History
- First air date: October 29, 1945
- Former call signs: WKRJ (1945); WMAJ (1945–2009); WQWK (2009–2023)
- Call sign meaning: "Legends"

Technical information
- Licensing authority: FCC
- Facility ID: 48923
- Class: C
- Power: 1,000 watts unlimited
- Transmitter coordinates: 40°48′32″N 77°50′28″W
- Translator: 103.7 W279DK (State College)
- Repeater: 1260 WLGJ (Philipsburg)

Links
- Public license information: Public file; LMS
- Webcast: Listen live
- Website: bigfootcountrylegends.com

WLEJ (1450 kHz) is a classic country AM radio station broadcasting in State College, Pennsylvania, United States. It is owned by Seven Mountains Media, through licensee Southern Belle Media Family, LLC. Programming is also heard over FM translator W279DK (103.7 FM), offering a signal on the FM band in the immediate State College area.

== History ==
Centre Broadcasters, Inc., applied for a construction permit from the Federal Communications Commission (FCC) to build a new 250-watt radio station in State College on April 18, 1944. The application was approved on July 10, 1945. Broadcasting of Centre County's first radio station began on October 29 of that year from studios in State College's Glennland Building and a transmitter site north of town in Ferguson Township. The WMAJ call sign was submitted out of desperation; after various call signs to allude to Centre County and State College were rejected, Centre Broadcasters submitted scrambled versions of the initials of its various employees, including Alethea J. Mattern, the first program director,and the other founding owner, Richard J. Kennard (the FCC originally assigned WKRJ). The station was approved to upgrade from 250 to 1,000 watts in 1962 after having filed in late 1958 for the change. In the 1960s, WMAJ programmed a Top 40 format aimed at the large student audience at Penn State University.

The main owner of WMAJ was William K. Ulerich, who had previously transformed the weekly newspaper in State College into a daily publication, the Centre Daily Times; in the 1970s, he also served as a trustee of Penn State University.Ulerich owned WMAJ and its FM spinoff, WMAJ-FM/WXLR 103.1, until 1988, when he opted to retire and sold the pair to Burbach Broadcasting of Pittsburgh.The new ownership converted WMAJ to primarily automated programming focusing on adult standards music.This was changed to a full news/talk format in 1990.

Forever Broadcasting acquired the Burbach stations in 1998; by that time, WMAJ's talk format included such offerings as The Rush Limbaugh Show and the talk programs of Joy Brown and G. Gordon Liddy.In 2002, Forever installed a sports format on the frequency.The call letters were changed to WQWK in 2009 after the previous WQWK, 103.1 FM, was flipped to conservative talk.

It was announced on October 12, 2022, that Forever Media was selling 34 stations and 12 translators, including WQWK and five of its sister stations, to State College-based Seven Mountains Media for $17.375 million. The deal closed on January 1, 2023.

On December 30, 2022, it was announced that the station would flip to classic country as "Bigfoot Legends" within days.

On January 3, 2023, WQWK changed their format from sports to classic country, branded as "Bigfoot Country Legends". The station changed its call sign to WLEJ on February 5, 2023.

== Programming ==
The station is one of four stations in State College that are local flagships of the Penn State Nittany Lions radio network. It also is part of the Pittsburgh Steelers radio network.
