= WFGE =

Radio station in State College, Pennsylvania

- State College, Pennsylvania; United States
- Frequency: 101.1 MHz
- Branding: Big Froggy 101

Programming
- Format: Country
- Affiliations: Compass Media Networks; Westwood One

Ownership
- Owner: Seven Mountains Media; (Southern Belle Media Family, LLC)
- Sister stations: WBHV; WBUS; WLEJ; WLGJ; WOWY; WZWW

History
- First air date: August 15, 1961 (as WGMR)
- Former call signs: WGMR (1961–2008)
- Call sign meaning: "Froggy"

Technical information
- Licensing authority: FCC
- Facility ID: 1057
- Class: B
- ERP: 8,500 watts
- HAAT: 357 meters
- Transmitter coordinates: 40°55′10.0″N 77°58′28.0″W

Links
- Public license information: Public file; LMS
- Webcast: Listen live
- Website: bigfroggy101.com

WFGE (101.1 FM) is a country music formatted radio station licensed to State College, Pennsylvania, serving the State College–Bellefonte area. WFGE is owned and operated by Seven Mountains Media, through licensee Southern Belle Media Family, LLC.

WFGE boasts one of the strongest signals in Central Pennsylvania.

== History ==
Founded by Allegheny Mountain Network President Cary H. Simpson, WGMR first signed on the air on August 15, 1961, as the FM sister station to WTRN Tyrone. Though also licensed to Tyrone, WGMR has primarily served State College and Centre County. Through the years, WGMR has changed formats a couple times, from country to alternative and Top 40 at the turn of the 21st century.

Prior to the top 40 format, WGMR was the State College region's alternative music station, branded as "101.1 The Revolution", and was rated one of the Top 10 alternative stations in the country for a couple of years. The station switched formats and became a Top 40 radio station using the handle "The All New Revolution 101", which was later shortened to "G101". The station also broadcast at 101.3 FM in Altoona, but no longer does due to the Altoona area already having a "Froggy" station, "Froggy 98".

This station was previously owned by the Allegheny Mountain Network, and was sold to Forever Broadcasting of Altoona on July 2, 2008. Prior to the sale of the station, the station invited back some of the old personalities for one last show. On the last day before the sale was final the station turned back the clock for a couple of hours and played Alternative music under the Revolution branding.

The station is now a country music station serving communities primarily in Centre County, Clearfield Country, Clinton County, Huntingdon County, and Mifflin County, and northern portions of Blair County, all in central Pennsylvania.

== WFGE today ==
Starting July 7, 2008, WGMR began broadcasting a country station owned by Forever Broadcasting branded "Froggy 101." Shortly after, WGMR switched its call sign to WFGE. The WFGE call sign was originally used by a station in Murray, Kentucky that is also a "Froggy" country station. The old WFGE is now called WFGS, although the branding did not change.

As of October 25, 2010, the station is known as "Big Froggy 101" to avoid confusion with WGGY (101.3 FM) from Scranton.

It was announced on October 12, 2022, that Forever Media was selling 34 stations, including WFGE and five of its sister stations, to State College-based Seven Mountains Media for $17.3 million. The deal closed on January 1, 2023.
