= Mexico, Juniata County, Pennsylvania =

Unincorporated community in Pennsylvania, US

Mexico, Pennsylvania
- Census-designated place
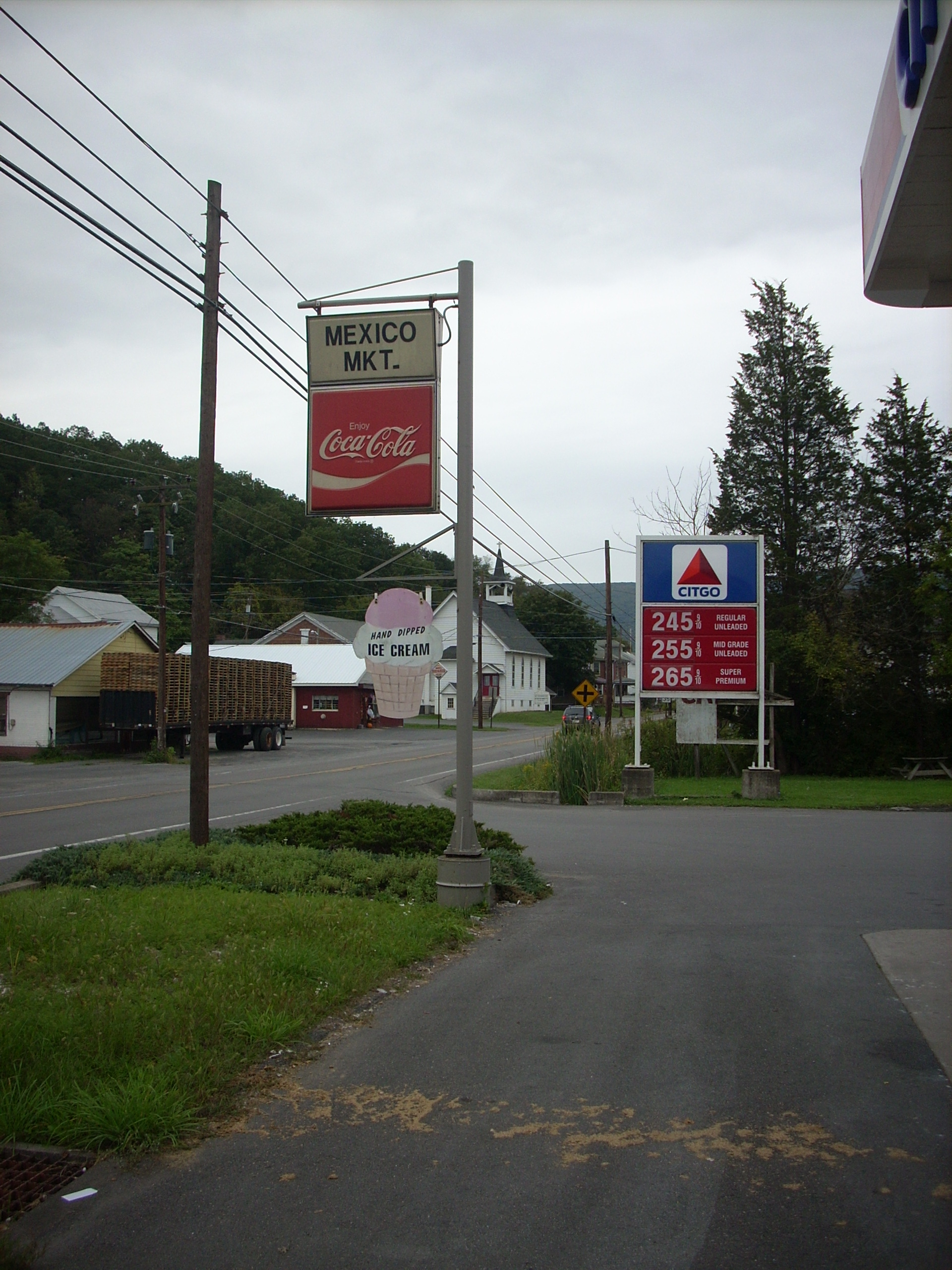
- Mexico Mkt. and gas station

- Location within Pennsylvania Location within the United States
- Coordinates: 40°32′36″N 77°21′17″W
- Country: United States
- State: Pennsylvania
- County: Juniata
- Township: Walker

Area
  - Total: 1.08 sq mi (2.81 km^{2})
  - Land: 1.08 sq mi (2.81 km^{2})
  - Water: 0 sq mi (0.00 km^{2})
- Elevation: 443 ft (135 m)

Population (2020)
  - Total: 398
  - Density: 366.8/sq mi (141.64/km^{2})
- Time zone: UTC-5 (Eastern (EST))
  - Summer (DST): UTC-4 (EDT)
- ZIP code: 17056
- Area code: 717
- FIPS code: 42-48904
- GNIS feature ID: 1180983

Mexico is an unincorporated community and census-designated place (CDP) in Walker Township, Juniata County, Pennsylvania, United States.

The population was 472 at the time of the 2010 census.

== Geography ==
Mexico is located in central Juniata County at 40°32′36″N 77°21′17″W (40.543341, -77.354771), in the western part of Walker Township. It is bordered to the south by the Juniata River.

U.S. Routes 22 and 322 run concurrently as a four-lane expressway along the northeastern edge of the community, with access from PA 75 at the northern tip of the community. Routes 22 and 322 lead northwest 17 miles (27 km) to Lewistown and southeast 27 miles (43 km) to Duncannon. PA 75 leads southwest 1.4 miles (2.3 km) across the Juniata River to Port Royal, and the William Penn Highway (old Routes 22/322) leads northwest 3 miles (5 km) to Mifflintown, the Juniata county seat.

According to the United States Census Bureau, the Mexico CDP has a total area of 1.1 square miles (2.8 km^{2}), all land.

== Demographics ==
Historical population
Census	Pop.	Note	%±
2020	398		—
U.S. Decennial Census

As of the census of 2000, there were 279 people, 112 households, and 89 families residing in the CDP.

The population density was 375.7 inhabitants per square mile (145.1/km^{2}). There were 116 housing units at an average density of 156.2 units per square mile (60.3 units/km^{2}). The racial makeup of the CDP was 98.57% White, 1.08% African American, and 0.36% from two or more races.

There were 112 households, out of which 25.9% had children under the age of eighteen living with them; 63.4% were married couples living together, 10.7% had a female householder with no husband present, and 20.5% were non-families. 18.8% of all households were made up of individuals, and 9.8% had someone living alone who was sixty-five years of age or older.

The average household size was 2.49 and the average family size was 2.79.

In the CDP the population was spread out, with 20.1% under the age of eighteen, 8.2% from eighteen to twenty-four, 26.5% from twenty-five to forty-four, 31.5% from forty-five to sixty-four, and 13.6% who were sixty-five years of age or older. The median age was forty-one years.

For every one hundred females there were 96.5 males. For every one hundred females aged eighteen and over, there were 93.9 males.

The median income for a household in the CDP was $35,417, and the median income for a family was $35,833. Males had a median income of $21,908 compared with that of $19,063 for females.

The per capita income for the CDP was $16,620. 10.0% of the population and 7.1% of families were below the poverty line. Out of the total number of people living in poverty, 20.3% were under the age of eighteen. None were aged sixty-five or older.
