= WZWW (FM) =

Radio station in Boalsburg, Pennsylvania

- Boalsburg, Pennsylvania; United States
- Broadcast area: State College, Pennsylvania
- Frequency: 93.7 MHz
- Branding: 93.7 3WZ

Programming
- Format: Hot adult contemporary

Ownership
- Owner: Seven Mountains Media; (Southern Belle Media Family, LLC)
- Sister stations: WBHV; WBUS; WFGE; WLEJ; WLGJ; WOWY

History
- First air date: April 13, 1988 (as WBUS)
- Former call signs: WVCV (1991–1997); WBUS (1997–2019); WMAJ (2019–2023)

Technical information
- Licensing authority: FCC
- Facility ID: 6025
- Class: A
- ERP: 330 watts
- HAAT: 415 meters (1,362 ft)

Links
- Public license information: Public file; LMS
- Webcast: Listen live
- Website: www.3wz.com

WZWW (93.7 MHz) is a hot adult contemporary music formatted radio station licensed to Boalsburg, Pennsylvania, United States, and serving the State College area.

== History ==
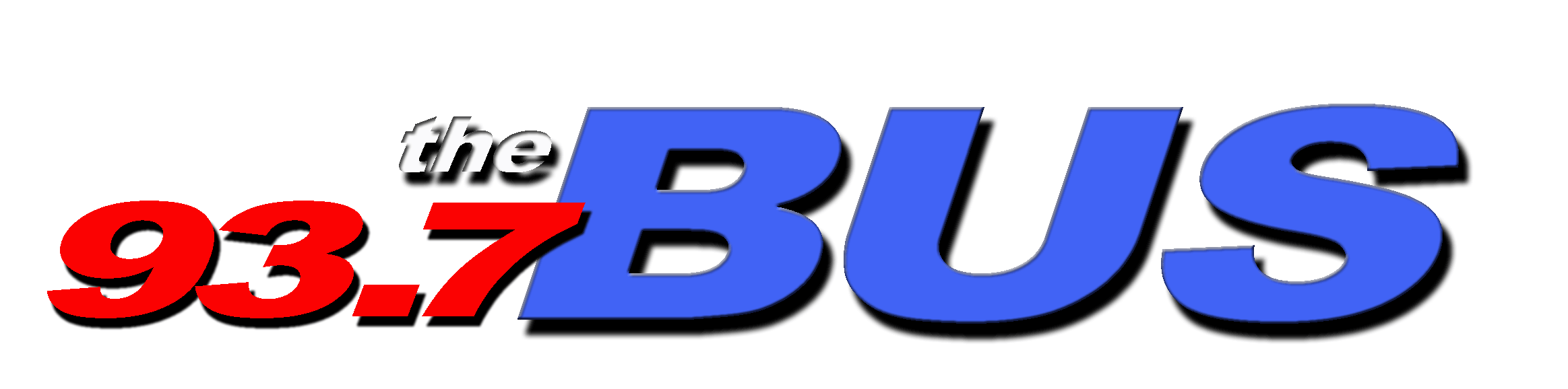
Logo as "93.7 The Bus"

WZWW signed on as WBUS on April 13, 1998, part of Boalsburg Broadcasting, with a city of license of Boalsburg, Pennsylvania. The station was purchased later by Dame Broadcasting in 2001, then by Forever Broadcasting in March 2005.

On January 22, 2019, the station's classic rock format swapped frequencies with 99.5 WMAJ-FM, with the station changing its call sign to WMAJ and assuming a Top 40 format.

It was announced on October 12, 2022, that Forever Media was selling 34 stations and 12 translators, including WMAJ and five other sister stations, to State College-based Seven Mountains Media for $17.375 million. The deal closed on January 1, 2023.

On December 30, 2022, it was announced that the station would adopt a hot adult contemporary format and the "3WZ" branding, both moving from WZWW (95.3 FM), within days. On January 3, 2023, the format and branding were moved from 95.3 FM to 93.7 FM, with the station changing its call sign to WZWW on January 11.
