= WOWY (FM) =

Radio station in State College, Pennsylvania

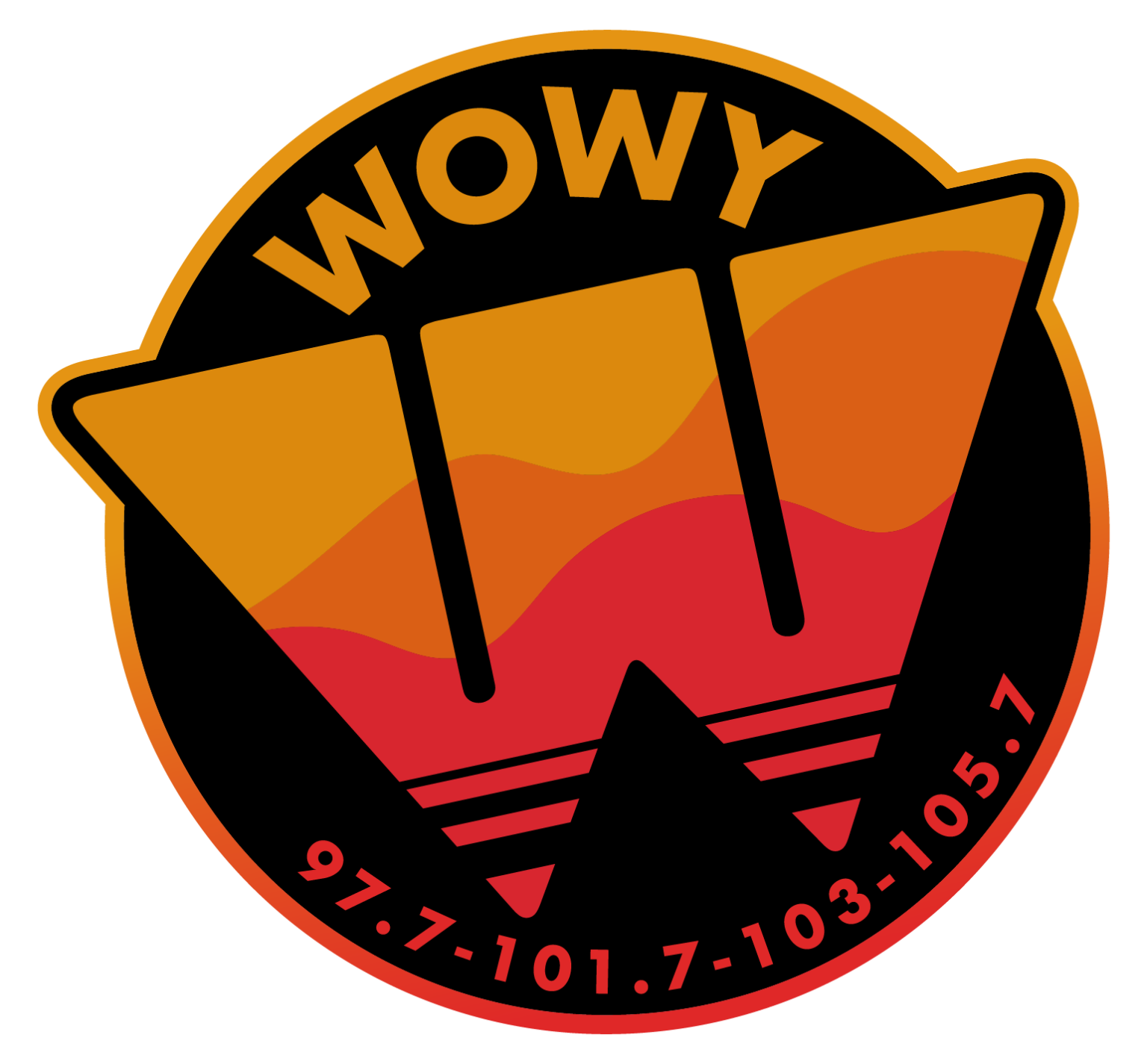
- State College, Pennsylvania; United States
- Frequency: 103.1 MHz
- Branding: WOWY 97.7 103.1 103.5

Programming
- Format: Classic hits
- Affiliations: United Stations Radio Networks; Penn State Nittany Lions

Ownership
- Owner: Seven Mountains Media; (Southern Belle Media Family, LLC)
- Sister stations: WBHV; WBUS; WFGE; WLEJ; WLGJ; WZWW

History
- First air date: 1965 (as WMAJ-FM)
- Former call signs: WMAJ-FM (1964–1972); WXLR (1972–1988); WBHV (1988–2005); WJHT (2005–2006); WJHT-FM (2006); WQKK (2006); WQWK (2006–2009); WRSC-FM (2009–2016); WAPY (2016–2023)

Technical information
- Licensing authority: FCC
- Facility ID: 48926
- Class: A
- ERP: 370 watts
- HAAT: 398 meters (1,306 ft)
- Transmitter coordinates: 40°48′30″N 77°56′32″W
- Repeaters: 1150 WHUN (Huntingdon); 103.5 WHUN-FM (Huntingdon)

Links
- Public license information: Public file; LMS
- Webcast: Listen live
- Website: wowyonline.com

WOWY (103.1 FM) is a classic hits radio station in State College, Pennsylvania, United States, operating with a power of 370 watts. The station is owned by Seven Mountains Media.

== History ==
The talk programming of WRSC moved from 1390 AM to 103.1 FM on Monday, August 3, 2009, as "Newsradio 103 WRSC".

Until May 20, 2015, WRSC-FM carried many nationally syndicated shows such as, Coast to Coast AM with George Noory, America in the Morning with Jim Bohannon, The Glenn Beck Program, The Dave Ramsey Show, The Sean Hannity Show, The Michael Savage Show, The Mark Levin Show, The Jerry Doyle Show, The Clark Howard Show, and Live on Sunday Night with Bill Cunningham. WRSC-FM also aired a local show, The WRSC Morning Show, starring Centre Region-area radio veteran Kevin Nelson (& Company), which was replaced with Pat Urban show. WRSC-FM aired NASCAR programming as well during the week from MRN Radio.

The news/talk format moved from WRSC-FM back to 1390 AM on May 20, 2015, as 103.1 flipped to classic hits as WAPY, "Happy 103.1".

It was announced on October 12, 2022, that Forever Media was selling 34 stations and 12 translators, including WAPY and five other sister stations, to State College-based Seven Mountains Media for $17.375 million. The deal closed on January 1, 2023.

On December 30, 2022, it was announced that the station's classic hits format would be merged with that of Seven Mountains Media's WOWY (97.1 FM) within days. On January 3, 2023, WAPY picked up the WOWY classic hits format from 97.1, which began stunting towards a new format. WAPY changed its call sign to WOWY on January 16, 2023.
