= WNLI (FM) =

State College, Pennsylvania; United States
- Broadcast area: State College, Pennsylvania
- Frequency: 94.5 MHz
- Branding: Air1

Programming
- Format: Contemporary worship

Ownership
- Owner: Educational Media Foundation
- Sister stations: WKPA

History
- First air date: October 23, 1991 (as WGGY)
- Former call signs: WGGY (1991–1992); WFGI (1992–2001); WLTS (2001–2006); WSMO (2006); WBHV-FM (2006–2023)

Technical information
- Licensing authority: FCC
- Facility ID: 38271
- Class: A
- ERP: 1,900 watts
- HAAT: 179 meters (587 ft)
- Transmitter coordinates: 40°54′04″N 77°50′20″W

Links
- Public license information: Public file; LMS
- Webcast: Listen Live
- Website: www.air1.com

WNLI (94.5 MHz) is a radio station licensed to serve State College, Pennsylvania. The station is owned by Educational Media Foundation.

== History ==
=== Early years ===
WNLI's history broadcasting to State College on the 94.5 FM frequency includes operating under the call signs WGGY (1991–1992), WFGI (1992–2001), adult contemporary WLTS (2001–2006), and WSMO (February–August 2006). The call sign was officially changed to WBHV-FM on August 29, 2006.

=== WNLI ===
On December 30, 2022, it was announced that the station's top 40/CHR format would move to WRSC (1390 AM) as "Pop Radio" within days. On January 3, 2023, WBHV-FM dropped its top 40/CHR format and began stunting. The call sign was changed to WNLI on March 26, 2023. After taking the station silent that June following the loss of its programming source, JFLIV agreed to sell WNLI to the Educational Media Foundation (EMF) in September 2023 as part of a $200,000 deal that also saw EMF transfer translator station W296CD (107.1 FM) in Jonestown to JFLIV. EMF already owned K-Love station WKPA (107.9 FM) in the State College area, and as such, the station is expected to change to their Air 1 network upon sale closure.
