= WCGF =

WCGF may refer to:

- WCGF-FM, a radio station (104.3 FM) licensed to serve Moon Township, Pennsylvania, United States
- WCGF-LP, a low-power radio station (104.3 FM) licensed to serve Greer, South Carolina, United States
- WESD, a radio station (92.1 FM) licensed to serve Elwood City, Pennsylvania, United States, which held the call sign WCGF-FM from June to September 2026
- WCGV (FM), a radio station (89.9 FM) licensed to serve Cambridge Springs, Pennsylvania, United States, which held the call sign WCGF from 2010 to 2016
