= WASP (AM) =

Radio station in Brownsville, Pennsylvania (1968–2012)

- Brownsville, Pennsylvania; United States
- Broadcast area: Pittsburgh, Pennsylvania
- Frequency: 1130 kHz
- Branding: The Pickle

Programming
- Format: Defunct (was Classic Hits (simulcast of WPKL) )

Ownership
- Owner: Keymarket Licenses, LLC

History
- First air date: August 2, 1968
- Last air date: June 28, 2012

Technical information
- Licensing authority: FCC
- Facility ID: 65708
- Class: D
- Power: 1,000 watts (Daytime); 1,000 watts (Critical Hours)
- Transmitter coordinates: 40°2′35.00″N 79°54′19.00″W

Links
- Public license information: Public file; LMS

WASP (1130 AM) was a radio station formerly licensed to Brownsville, Pennsylvania, United States. It served the Pittsburgh area. The station was owned by Keymarket Licenses, LLC.

== History ==
WASP was one of the first stations in a last round of FCC daytime-only licenses granted towards the end of the 1960s, at the time that FM was beginning to gain momentum. WASP was granted a license to broadcast on 1130 kHz, with a power of 1 kW non-directional while WKEG was granted a license to broadcast on 1110 kHz, 1 kW directional from nearby Washington, Pennsylvania at around this same time. When WASP increased its power in the early 1970s to 5 kW and because of the close proximity of WKEG, WASP had to adopt a directional antenna pattern during daytime hours and 1 kW non-direction pattern during "Critical Hours" (2 hrs morning and 2 hours evening) to protect their adjacent competitor.

WASP was founded by Carl Loughry in the late 1960s and formed Brownsville Radio, Inc. Mr. Laughry also owned WFRB in Frostburg, Maryland. WASP was managed for many years by Bob Logue (a.k.a. Bob Williams) who went on to host the Midnight to 5AM talk program on KDKA in Pittsburgh. James J. Humes, who formed The Humes Broadcasting Corporation, purchased WASP from Laughry in the 1980s. WASP operated for many years with a classic country format, and in the late 1980s, Humes Broadcasting successfully applied for an FM license. After being granted the construction permit, WASP began to add more talk to its programming lineup. Kim Smith, Bill Alexander and Joe Gearing were a few of the local talk show hosts heard on WASP.

== WASP-FM signs on ==
Though the construction permit for WASP-FM in Oliver, Pennsylvania was first issued in 1988, it wouldn't go on the air until 1993. Nevertheless, WASP-FM did go on the air, and operated with a country music format similar to the one given up by its AM sister in favor of local and syndicated national talk.

WASP-FM, operating on 94.9, transmitted its signal from North Union Township. However, both stations shared studio space in the single-story brick building which also housed the transmitter of WASP (AM) along Route 88 (a.k.a. Blaine Road), just south of California, Pennsylvania.

== Sale to Keymarket Communications ==
In 1999, James Humes wanted to retire from the radio business after more than a decade of ownership. He agreed to sell WASP-AM-FM to Keymarket Communications that year. Keymarket had acquired WASP-AM-FM in an effort to use WASP-FM as a vehicle for its "Froggy" brand of networked country music stations. With the transaction went WASP-FM morning announcer Jimmy Roach, who had enjoyed a highly successful run at both WDSY and WDVE in Pittsburgh. Roach was then the flagship morning DJ of Keymarket's entire Pittsburgh Froggy operation.

For its part, WASP went to a format of MOR music from ABC Radio's Timeless Classics satellite-delivered format, and discarded much of its local programming. By 2002, WASP abandoned the satellite delivered format and simulcast co-owned Keymarket oldies station WPKL, licensed to Uniontown.

== WASP prior to suspending operations ==
The operations for WASP and its newly acquired Keymarket affiliate stations in the area moved from its longtime location on Route 88 to a new state-of-the-art facility at Foster Plaza in Greentree, just outside Pittsburgh's city limits.

In April 2007, Keymarket Communications successfully applied for a facility change to reduce its power from 5,000 watts directional to 1,000 watts non-directional. The change allowed WASP to only have to broadcast from one single tower, rather than two as had been the case in years past. Some facilities related to both the AM and FM stations reside in the same building that had been WASP's home for many years. The building has been expanded and now resides next to the athletic complex of California University of Pennsylvania.

On August 28, 2010, WASP went silent (off the air). As of Saturday, September 18, 2010, WASP resumed its ongoing simulcast of WPKL.

On June 28, 2012, WASP went silent again. Keymarket surrendered the station's license to the Federal Communications Commission (FCC) on July 6, 2012. The FCC cancelled the license and deleted the WASP call sign from its database on July 19, 2012.
