= Pittsburgh Derby Brats =

Junior Flat track roller derby league

- Metro area: Pittsburgh, PA
- Country: United States
- Founded: 2013
- Teams: Yinzer Dead AllStars (L3 A); PittBulls (L3 B); PittSqueaks (L2)
- Track type: Flat
- Affiliations: JRDA
- Org. type: 501(c)3
- Website: www.pittsburghderbybrats.net

The Pittsburgh Derby Brats (PDB) are an all-gender junior roller derby team based out of Pittsburgh, Pennsylvania.

== History ==
The Pittsburgh Derby Brats junior roller derby team was founded in 2013 for girls aged 10-17 as the first junior team in the state of Pennsylvania. The team became a JRDA member league in 2016.

In 2021, the league opened up for all genders to compete. This directly affected enrollment rates, with enrollment rising up to 80 skaters,

In 2023, the Yinzer Dead All Stars were formed as the team's open division Level 3 A-team with a roster of the top skaters in the league. The Level 3 B-team was named the PittBulls, paying homage to their coach PittBull Dozer. Similarly, the team's Level 3 female division team was named the Berry Bombers to honor another coach, Smashberry. The Level 2 team was named the Pitt Squeaks.

Skaters from the Brats have gone on to compete in the AAU Junior Olympics, JRDA National Championships, and have represented Team USA in the Junior Roller Derby World Cup.

=== In the media ===
The Pittsburgh Derby Brats have been featured several times over the years on different local news outlets, from their first feature on WTAE to 90.5 WESA to CBS News Pittsburgh.

== JRDA Championships ==
Year	Playoffs		Championships	
Year	Host	Place	Host	Place
2016	DNQ	DNQ	Lincoln, NE	DNQ
2017	DNQ	DNQ	Loveland, CO	DNQ
2018	DNQ	DNQ	Philadelphia, PA	DNQ
2019	DNQ	DNQ	Loveland, CO	DNQ
2022	Hagerstown, MD	2	Phoenix, AZ	DNQ
2023	Rochester, NY	1	Washington DC	6
2024	Lincoln, NE	2	Chicago, IL	DNQ
2025	Indianapolis, IN	1	Loveland, CO	6

- no rankings 2020-2022 due to COVID-19 pandemic
