= Allegheny Township, Somerset County, Pennsylvania =

Township in Pennsylvania, US

- Township
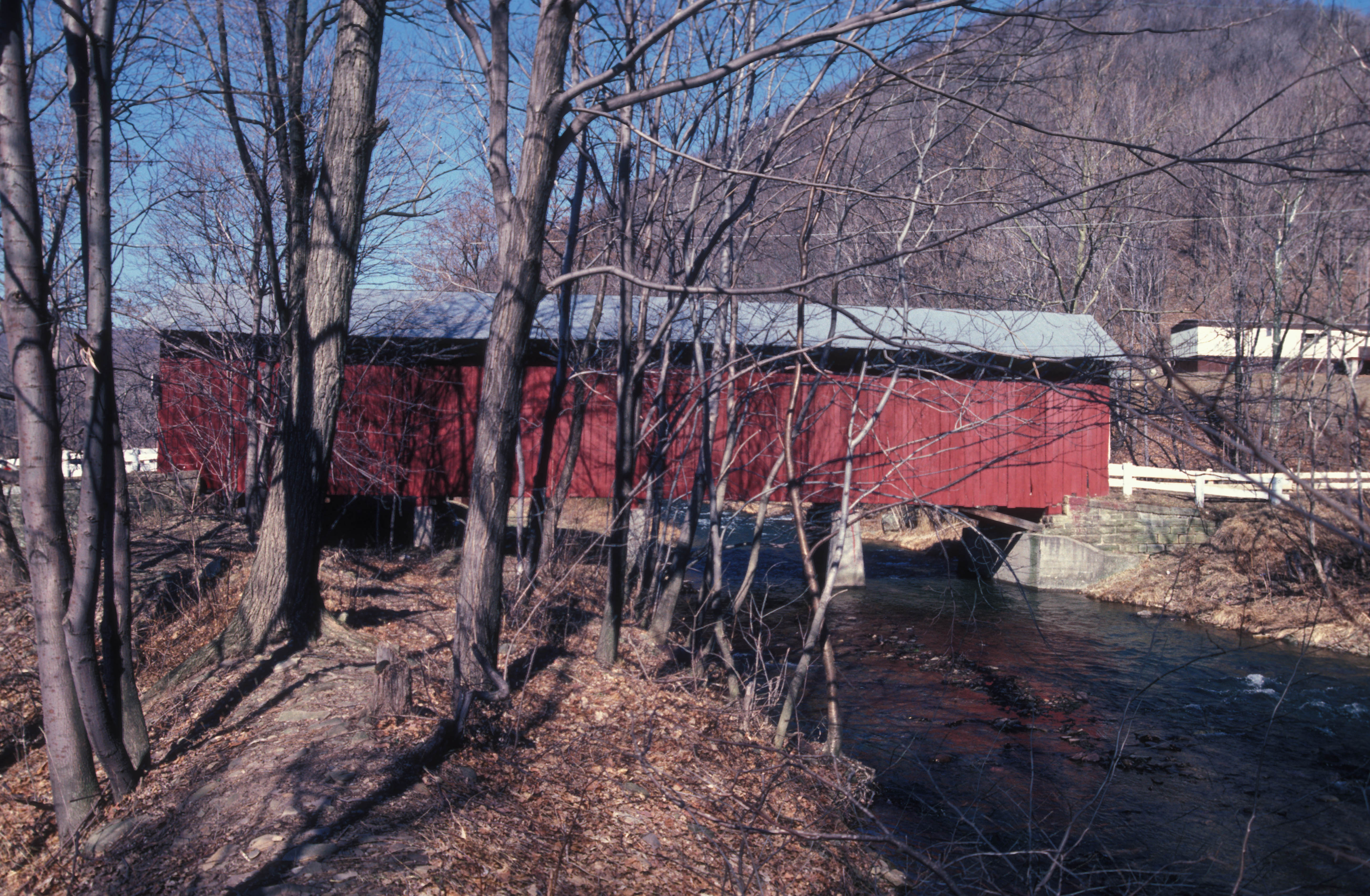
- New Baltimore Covered Bridge

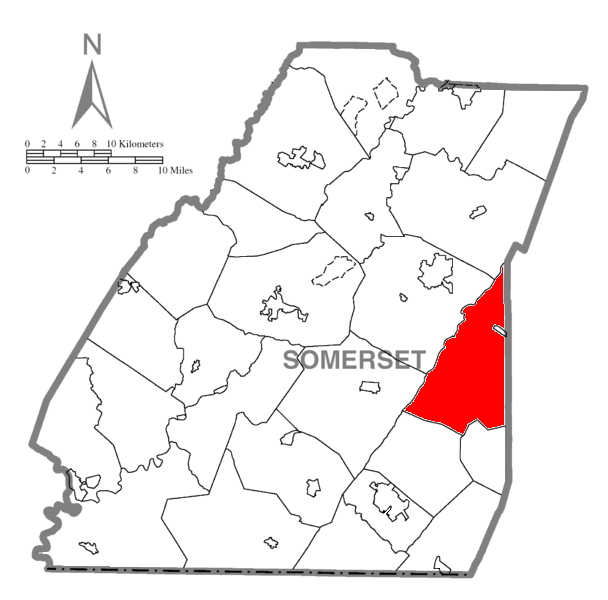
- Map of Somerset County, Pennsylvania Highlighting Allegheny Township

- Map of Somerset County, Pennsylvania
- Country: United States
- State: Pennsylvania
- County: Somerset
- Settled: 1790
- Incorporated: 1805

Area
  - Total: 51.09 sq mi (132.31 km^{2})
  - Land: 51.08 sq mi (132.30 km^{2})
  - Water: 0.0077 sq mi (0.02 km^{2})

Population (2020)
  - Total: 615 ▼
  - Estimate (2022): 615
  - Density: 13/sq mi (5.1/km^{2})
- Time zone: UTC-5 (Eastern (EST))
  - Summer (DST): UTC-4 (EDT)
- FIPS code: 42-111-00876

Allegheny Township is a township in Somerset County, Pennsylvania, United States. The population was 615 at the 2020 census. It is part of the Johnstown, Pennsylvania, Metropolitan Statistical Area.

== History ==
The remains of Fort Dewart (Duart) are in the northern part of the township, about half a mile north of U.S. Route 30, near the head of Breastwork Run. This small redoubt along Forbes Road was known as "the fort on the top of Allegheny Hill" during the French & Indian War.

== Geography ==
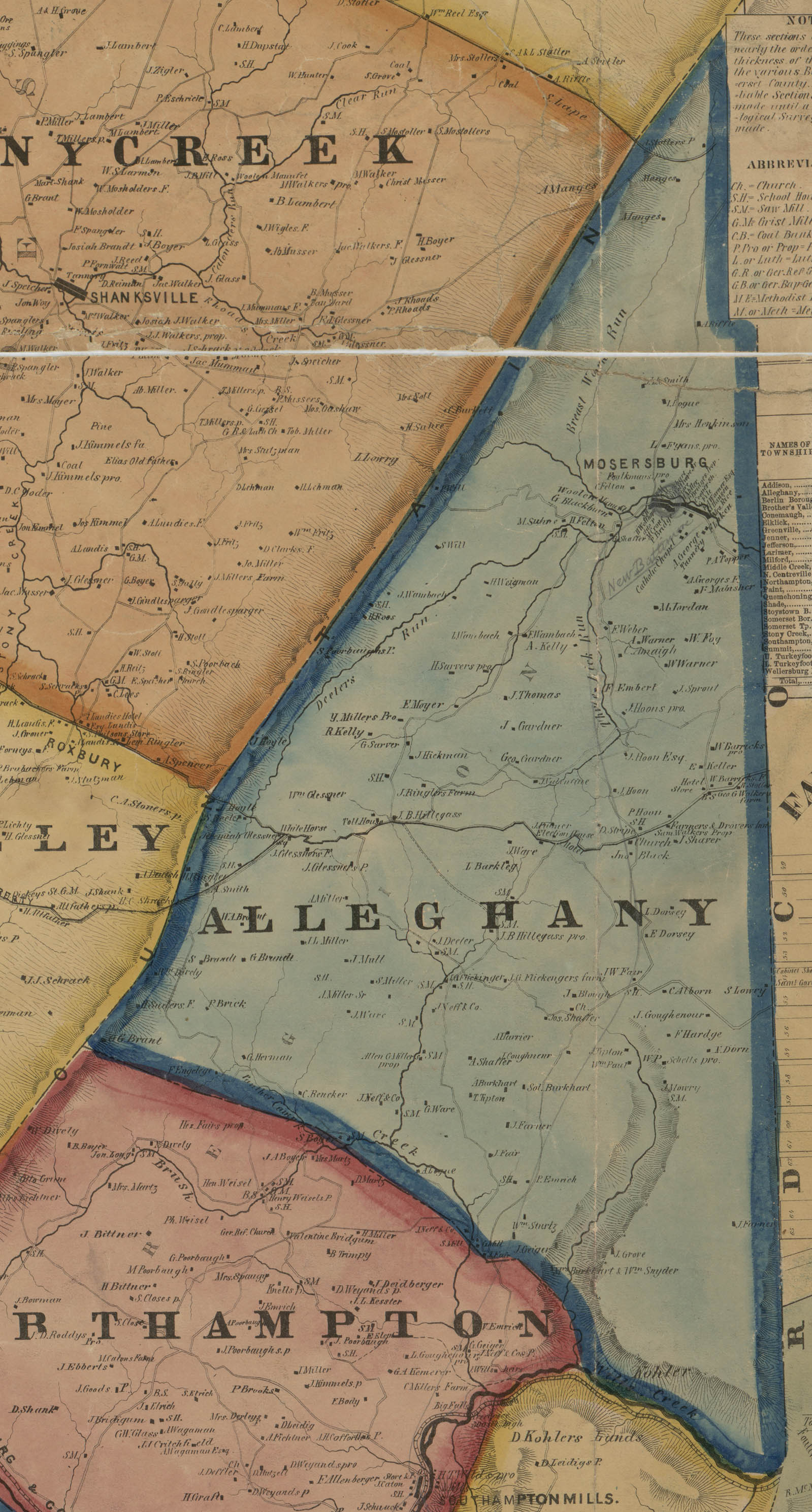
Allegheny Township, Somerset County, Pennsylvania, 1860

According to the United States Census Bureau, the township has a total area of 51.8 square miles (134 km^{2}), all land. Allegheny Township is bordered by Fairhope and Northampton townships to the south, Brothersvalley and Stonycreek townships to the west, Shade Township to the north, and Bedford County to the east. The borough of New Baltimore is located on the eastern edge of the township, along its border with Bedford County.

Pennsylvania Route 31 passes through Allegheny Township, running from the township's western border with Brothersvalley and Stonycreek townships to its eastern border with Bedford County. U.S. Route 30 / the Lincoln Highway passes through the extreme northern tip of Allegheny Township, running from Shade and Stonycreek townships on the west to Bedford County on the east. Interstates 70 and 76, both part of the Pennsylvania Turnpike mainline, also crosses the township. The Turnpike's eastern portal of the Allegheny Mountain Tunnel is in the township.

== Recreation ==
A small portion of the Pennsylvania State Game Lands Number 104 is located in the southeastern corner of the township.

== Demographics ==
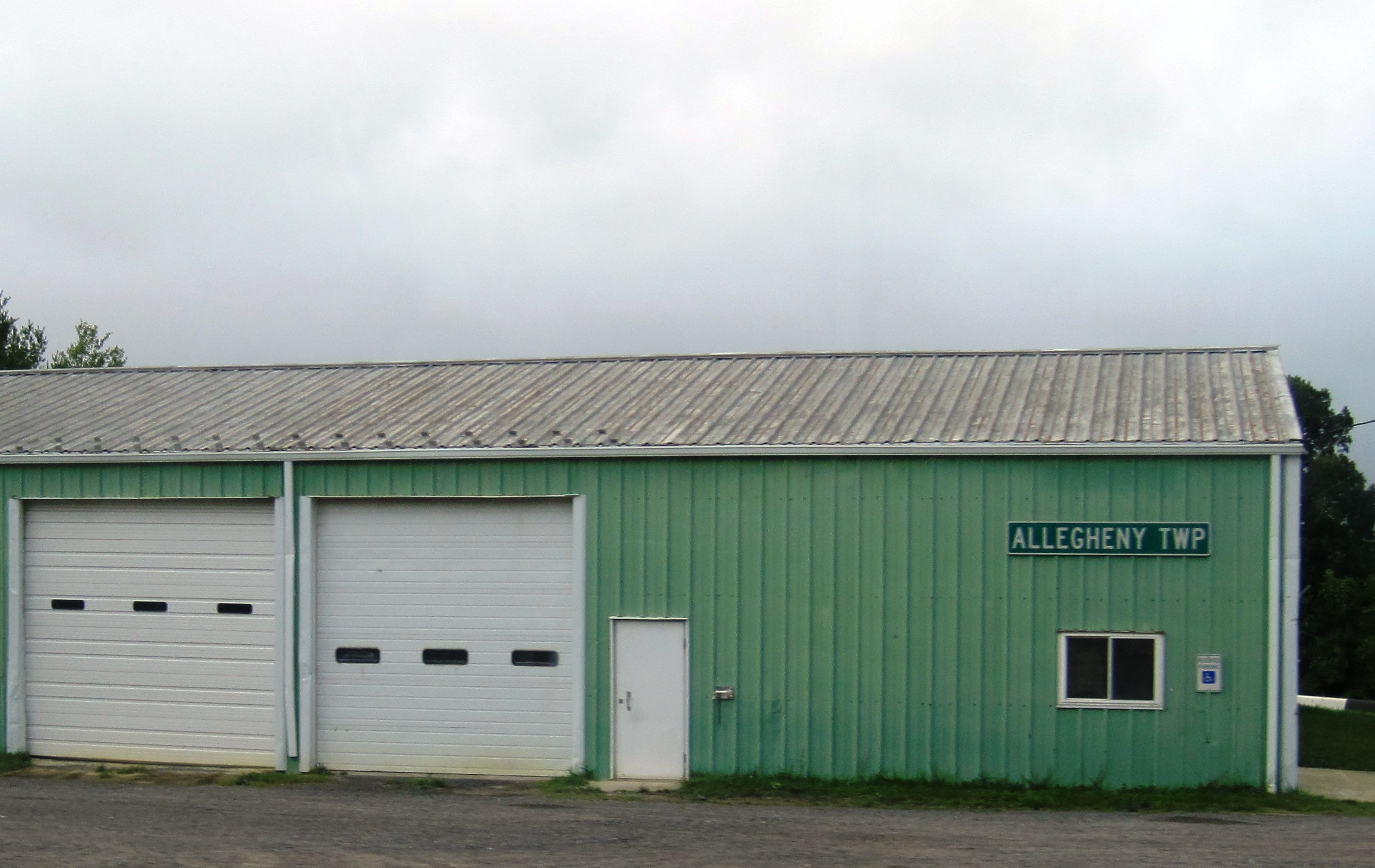
Allegheny Township Building

Historical population
Census	Pop.	Note	%±
2000	654		—
2010	692		5.8%
2020	615		−11.1%
2022 (est.)	615		0.0%
U.S. Decennial Census

At the 2000 census there were 654 people, 250 households, and 185 families living in the township. The population density was 12.6 people per square mile (4.9/km^{2}). There were 442 housing units at an average density of 8.5/sq mi (3.3/km^{2}). The racial makeup of the township was 97.86% White, 0.31% Asian, 1.68% from other races, and 0.15% from two or more races. Hispanic or Latino of any race were 1.68%.

Of the 250 households 30.4% had children under the age of 18 living with them, 63.2% were married couples living together, 5.6% had a female householder with no husband present, and 26.0% were non-families. 22.8% of households were one person and 8.8% were one person aged 65 or older. The average household size was 2.58 and the average family size was 3.04.

The age distribution was 22.2% under the age of 18, 7.2% from 18 to 24, 26.9% from 25 to 44, 29.2% from 45 to 64, and 14.5% 65 or older. The median age was 42 years. For every 100 females there were 105.7 males. For every 100 females age 18 and over, there were 111.2 males.

The median household income was $30,875 and the median family income was $38,000. Males had a median income of $25,536 versus $17,321 for females. The per capita income for the township was $14,970. About 12.5% of families and 14.9% of the population were below the poverty line, including 24.3% of those under age 18 and 12.5% of those age 65 or over.

== Education ==
It is in the Berlin Brothersvalley School District.
