= New Baltimore, Pennsylvania =

Borough in Pennsylvania, US

- Borough
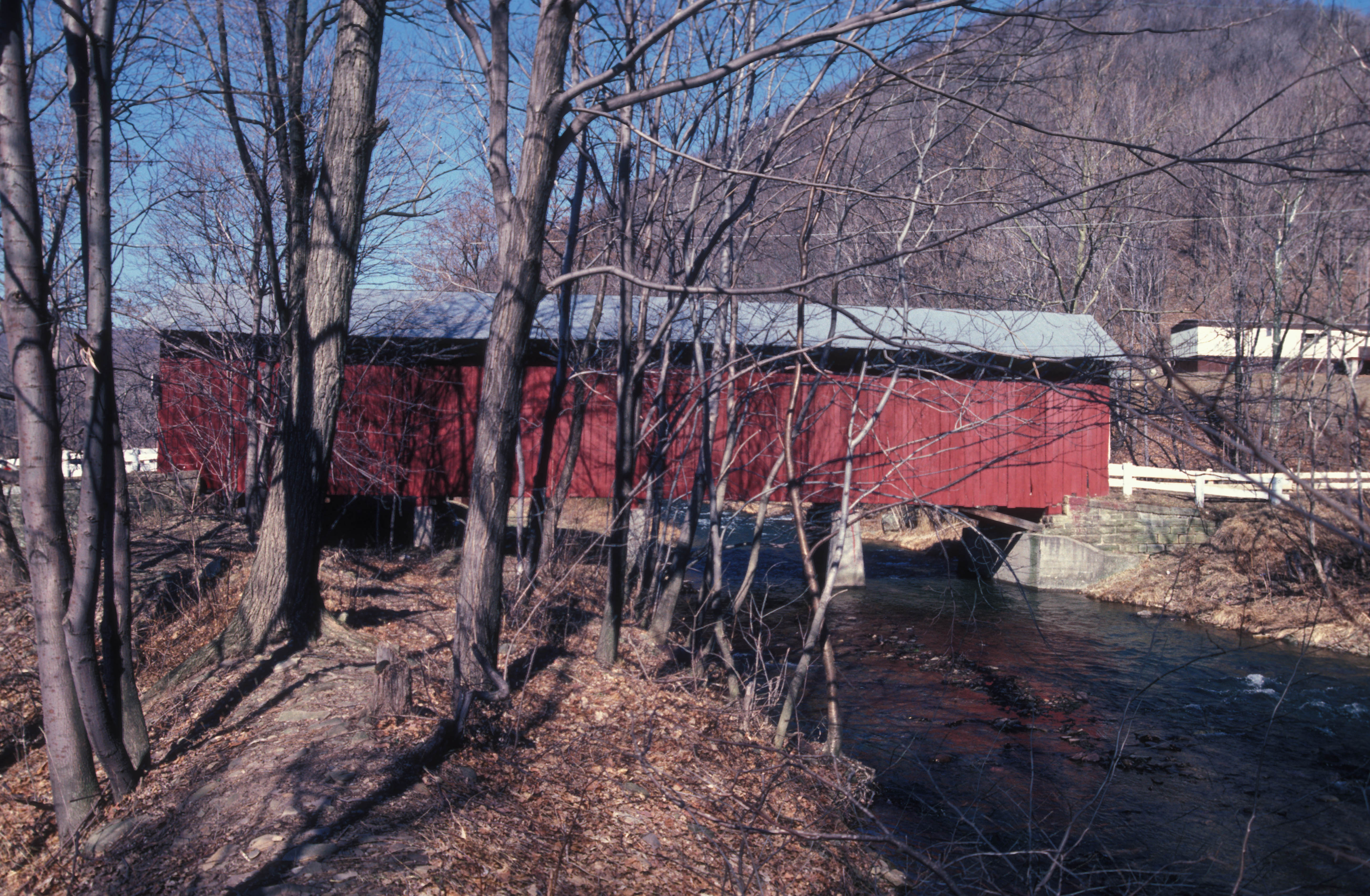
- New Baltimore Covered Bridge

- Location of New Baltimore in Somerset County, Pennsylvania.

- Location within Pennsylvania Location within the United States
- Coordinates: 39°59′02″N 78°46′20″W
- Country: United States
- State: Pennsylvania
- County: Somerset
- Settled: 1829
- Incorporated: 1874

Government
  - Type: Borough Council

Area
  - Total: 0.35 sq mi (0.90 km^{2})
  - Land: 0.35 sq mi (0.90 km^{2})
  - Water: 0 sq mi (0.00 km^{2})

Population (2020)
  - Total: 142
  - Density: 409.6/sq mi (158.16/km^{2})
- Time zone: UTC-5 (Eastern (EST))
  - Summer (DST): UTC-4 (EDT)
- ZIP code: 15553
- Area code: 814
- FIPS code: 42-53168

New Baltimore is a borough in Somerset County, Pennsylvania, United States. The population was 137 at the 2020 census. It is part of the Johnstown, Pennsylvania, Metropolitan Statistical Area.

== History ==
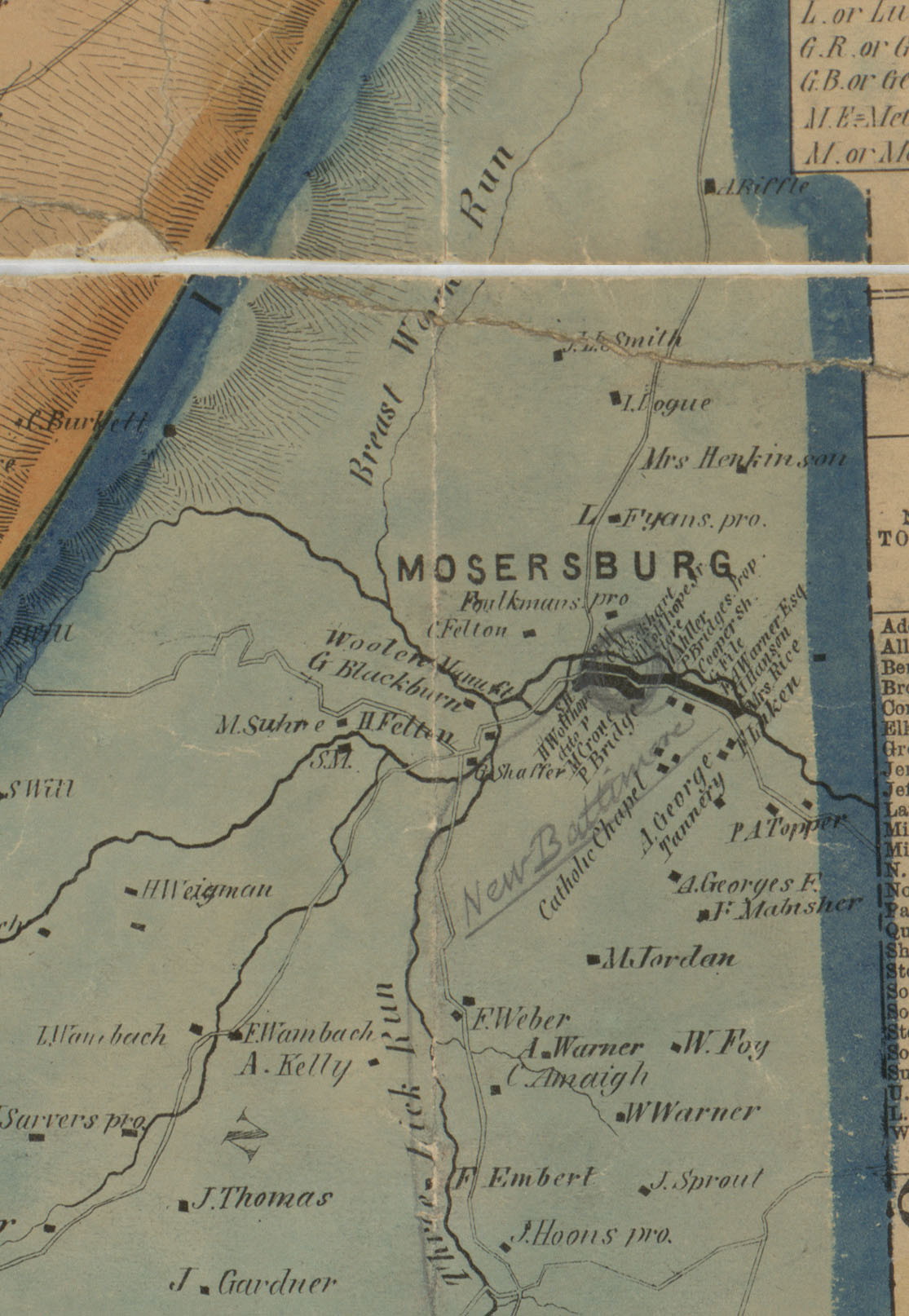
Mosersburg, Somerset County, PA, 1860

The first settler was Michael Riddlemoser, who built a house here in 1820, and laid out the street plan in 1829. The community was initially known as Mosersburg, and was later renamed New Baltimore, after Riddlemoser's hometown. The borough was incorporated in 1874.

In the 1880s, a major railroad yard and maintenance facility were planned for New Baltimore to serve the South Pennsylvania Railroad. In the end, construction on the railroad stopped and the tracks were never laid, and New Baltimore lost its chance to become a significant railroading center.

The New Baltimore Bridge, built in 1879, was added to the National Register of Historic Places in 1980.

== Geography ==
New Baltimore is located at 39°59′2″N 78°46′20″W (39.983808, −78.772154). The borough is located on the eastern edge of Allegheny Township, along its border with Bedford County. According to the United States Census Bureau, New Baltimore has a total area of 0.3 square miles (0.78 km^{2}), all land. Farmlands predominate in the village and the mountain range, with the majority of the area forested to the west.

== Demographics ==
Historical population
Census	Pop.	Note	%±
1880	150		—
1890	185		23.3%
1900	201		8.6%
1910	177		−11.9%
1920	174		−1.7%
1930	137		−21.3%
1940	260		89.8%
1950	221		−15.0%
1960	263		19.0%
1970	214		−18.6%
1980	221		3.3%
1990	162		−26.7%
2000	168		3.7%
2010	180		7.1%
2020	142		−21.1%
2021 (est.)	136	▼	−4.2%

As of the census of 2000, there were 168 people, 66 households, and 48 families residing in the borough. The population density was 531.7 inhabitants per square mile (205.3/km^{2}). There were 75 housing units at an average density of 237.4 per square mile (91.7/km^{2}). The racial makeup of the borough was 96.43% White and 3.57% Asian.

There were 66 households, out of which 31.8% had children under the age of 18 living with them, 65.2% were married couples living together, 4.5% had a female householder with no husband present, and 25.8% were non-families. 22.7% of all households were made up of individuals, and 12.1% had someone living alone who was 65 years of age or older. The average household size was 2.53 and the average family size was 2.92.

In the borough the population was spread out, with 22.6% under the age of 18, 4.8% from 18 to 24, 30.4% from 25 to 44, 25.0% from 45 to 64, and 17.3% who were 65 years of age or older. The median age was 39 years. For every 100 females there were 104.9 males. For every 100 females age 18 and over, there were 109.7 males.

The median income for a household in the borough was $30,000, and the median income for a family was $37,500. Males had a median income of $27,500 versus $22,031 for females. The per capita income for the borough was $14,552. About 8.0% of families and 5.8% of the population were below the poverty line, including 9.3% of those under the age of eighteen and 5.9% of those 65 or over.

== Education ==
It is in the Berlin Brothersvalley School District.

== Transportation ==
New Baltimore is just north of the Pennsylvania Turnpike (Interstates 70 and Interstate 76) but it has no interchange, it is also accessed via U.S. 30 (Lincoln Highway).

=== Church of the Turnpike ===
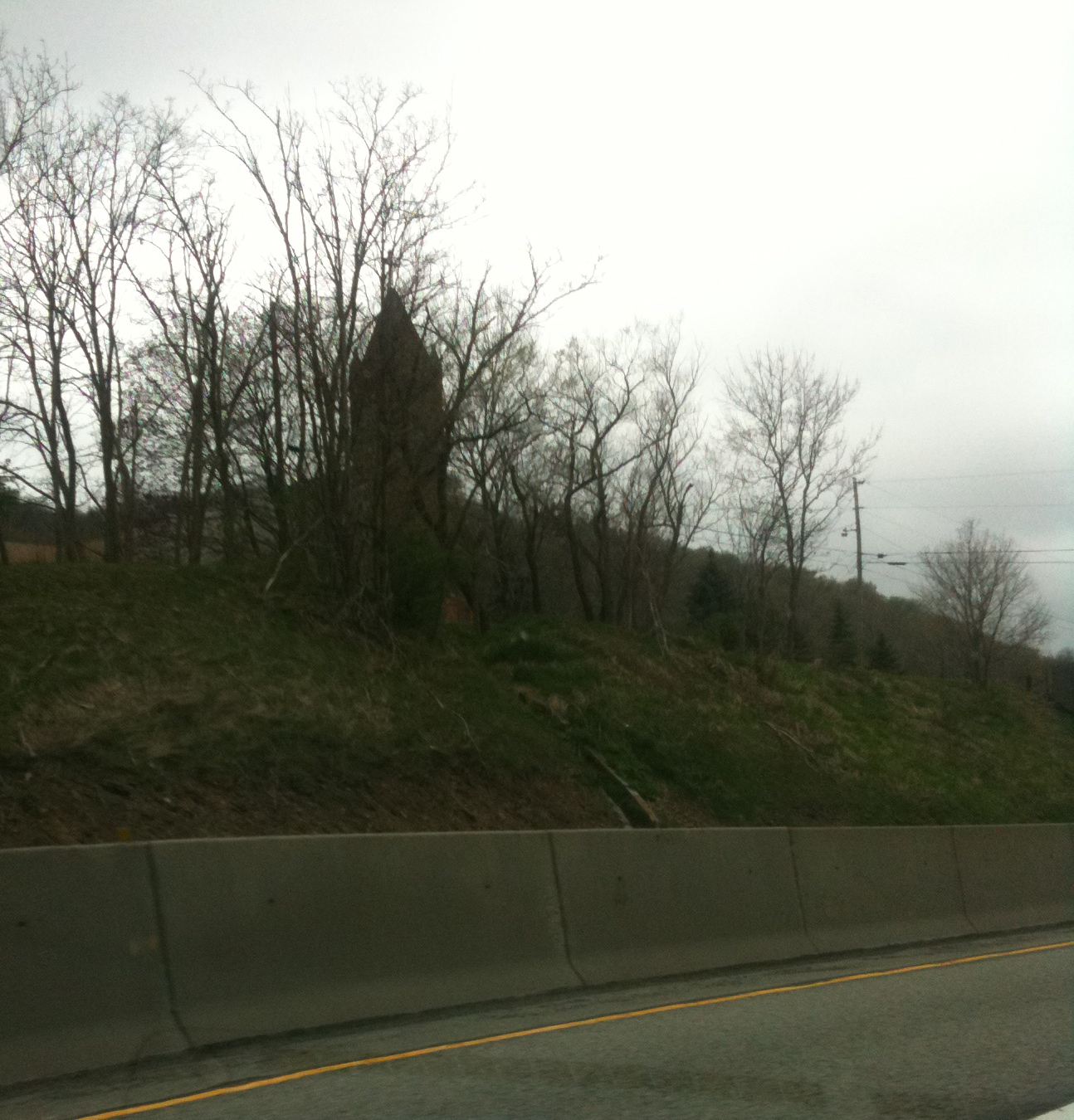
The stairs from the Pennsylvania Turnpike to St. John's Church in New Baltimore

New Baltimore is perhaps best known for being home to the St. John the Baptist Church, a Carmelite church located on the southern end of town. The church is unique in that it had two sets of steps along the Pennsylvania Turnpike at milepost 129, one set of each side of the highway. (The church itself is located on the eastbound side of the highway.) The steps dated from when the Turnpike first opened, as part of an informal, unwritten pact between the Pennsylvania Turnpike Commission (PTC) and the church after St. John's Church was separated from the rest of New Baltimore due to the Turnpike passing through. In addition, Carmelite priests were buried on the right-of-way of the Turnpike, and their graves had to be moved. The steps were long a novelty of the Turnpike and to curious travelers who have stopped along the Turnpike just to stop at the church.

In 2007, the PTC announced that it would eventually remove the steps that lead to St. John's Church. The steps were primarily being removed due to a widening project for the Turnpike. While a written pact has not been found by either the church or the PTC, even if a written pact were to be found, the Turnpike was forbidden by federal regulations to replace the steps in any case due to safety concerns. Despite the announcement, the PTC didn't start removing the steps until November 2022 when demolition work on the eastbound side of the steps began. The removal was completed by August 2023.
