= WOGG =

Radio station in Oliver, Pennsylvania

Simulcast with WOGI Moon Township
- Oliver, Pennsylvania; United States
- Broadcast area: Greater Pittsburgh Region
- Frequency: 94.9 MHz
- Branding: Froggy 94.9

Programming
- Format: Country

Ownership
- Owner: Forever Media (sale to Broadcast Communications pending); (FM Radio Licenses, LLC)
- Sister stations: WPKL

History
- First air date: June 11, 1993
- Former call signs: WXAK (1991–1993); WASP-FM (1993–2000)
- Call sign meaning: FrOGGy (station branding)

Technical information
- Facility ID: 65709
- Class: B1
- ERP: 1,650 watts
- HAAT: 376 meters 376 meters (1,234 ft)
- Transmitter coordinates: 39°52′11.00″N 79°38′22.00″W

Links
- Webcast: Listen live
- Website: www.foreverpittsburgh.com/froggy949/

WOGG (94.9 FM) is a radio station broadcasting a country music format. Licensed to Oliver, Pennsylvania, United States, the station is currently owned by Forever Media, and simulcasts with sister station WOGI.

WOGG is also one of the local primary stations for the Emergency Alert System for Fayette County, Pennsylvania; the other is WPKL 99.3.

== History ==
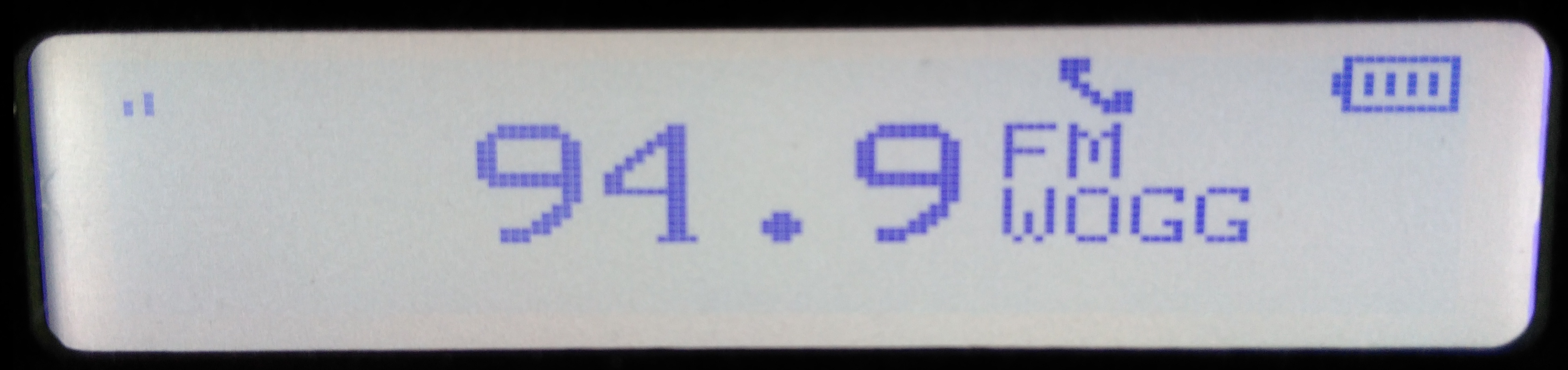
WOGG on a SPARC HD Radio with RDS.

The construction permit for this radio station was first issued June 16, 1988 to The Humes Broadcasting Corporation, licensee of the now-defunct WASP in Brownsville, Pennsylvania; about 12 miles north of Oliver.

The station was first issued the callsign WXAK on November 29, 1991, and on June 11, 1993, the station went on the air with the callsign WASP-FM, the call letters shared by its country-and-talk-formatted AM sister. WASP-FM went on the air with a country format, but with more current music and programmed entirely separately, with longtime Pittsburgh morning radio personality Jimmy Roach hosting the morning show.

Both stations operated out of their longtime studio location on Blaine Road (PA Route 88), just south of California until shortly after its sale to its present owner. This location was also the transmitter location for WASP, but the transmitter site for WASP-FM was located further south in North Union Township, Fayette County, Pennsylvania.

In 1999, Humes Broadcasting sold WASP-AM-FM to its current owner, Keymarket Communications, and on January 1, 2000, the station switched calls to WOGG.

WOGG was partially simulcast on WOGI in Moon Township, Pennsylvania for many years. The two stations had separate morning shows but were simulcast throughout the day. In July 2020, the stations combined into a full simulcast are known as Froggy 104.3 and Froggy 94.9.

In July 2026, it was announced that Forever Media would sell this station and WPKL to Broadcast Communications for $995,000, completing Forever's divestiture of the Pittsburgh market.
