= Radio Information Service =

American reading service for the blind

RIS Logo

The Radio Information Service or RIS was a reading service for the blind in Pittsburgh, Pennsylvania that was carried via subcarrier on WDUQ in Pittsburgh.

Prior to closing in 2009, the RIS weekly audience was 1,200 listeners with two-thirds of the audience over 60 years of age. Most listeners lived in Allegheny, Washington and Westmoreland Counties but RIS also served nine other counties in the region, including Armstrong, Beaver, Butler, Cambria, Fayette, Greene, Indiana, Lawrence and Somerset. RIS also serves parts of Ohio and West Virginia.

Listeners accessed RIS through a special FM radio receiver, over the Internet, on Comcast Cable systems or through the RIS Telephone Dial-In Service.

== Programming ==
RIS based its programming on its motto "Independence Through Information". Given that many visual impairments tend to be age-related, RIS's services were specially tailored to their needs. One of the most popular programs was the daily newspapers where a pair of narrators read local and regional newspapers, including the Pittsburgh Post-Gazette and the Pittsburgh Tribune-Review. Other programming included popular magazines, ads from grocery, drug and department stores, TV listings and other special interest publications. Additionally, RIS provided translations of printed material to Braille or audio recording.

== History ==
At its founding in 1976 RIS was broadcast from the campus of Duquesne University to whom it paid rent for space and a small fee for transmitter use on WDUQ-FM. Around 1991, the university told the small non-profit that it no longer had room for them on its campus and gave it 30 days to vacate. Protesting loudly, the service was able to convince the university that 30 days was not ample time to relocate. Following a year of emergency fund raising, design, and build-out, the station moved to the Birmingham Towers on the Southside neighborhood of Pittsburgh.

In 2004, facing a lack of funding and a possible shutdown, the board of RIS began exploring possibilities of partnering with another organization. On November 1, 2005, RIS entered into a Management Agreement with WDUQ. This agreement allowed the reading service to remain a separate 501(c)(3) nonprofit organization with a governing board responsible for all fundraising and community outreach while WDUQ was responsible for the day-to-day RIS business operations, including programming, services, personnel and volunteer management.

However, by 2009, the service was no longer able to sustain operations, and the service went inactive on August 14, 2009.

== Other Radio Information Service - for the blind ==
- Radio Reading Services - American Foundation for the Blind
- Chicagoland Radio Information Service Live
- NPR Illinois Radio Information Service
- Detroit Radio Information Service
- Radio Information Service by Wabash Valley College Live
- Sun Sounds of Arizona - Listen Live

== See also ==
- Radio reading service
