= WESA (FM) =

Radio station in Pittsburgh

Coordinates: 40.43004°N 79.98654°W

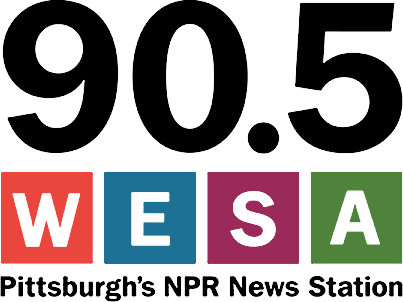
- Pittsburgh, Pennsylvania; United States
- Broadcast area: Pittsburgh metropolitan area
- Frequency: 90.5 MHz (HD Radio)
- Branding: 90.5 WESA

Programming
- Format: Public radio and talk
- Subchannels: HD2: JazzWorks; HD3: BBC World Service
- Affiliations: NPR; PRI; APM; BBC World Service

Ownership
- Owner: Pittsburgh Community Broadcasting Corporation
- Sister stations: WYEP-FM WESD

History
- First air date: December 15, 1949
- Former call signs: WDUQ (1949–2011)

Technical information
- Licensing authority: FCC
- Facility ID: 17747
- Class: B
- ERP: 25,000 watts
- HAAT: 146 meters (479 ft)

Links
- Public license information: Public file; LMS
- Webcast: Listen live
- Website: wesa.fm

WESA (90.5 FM) is a non-commercial radio station licensed to Pittsburgh, Pennsylvania, United States. A member station of National Public Radio (NPR), WESA features a talk and information-based public radio format. The studios and offices for WESA and sister station WYEP-FM (91.3) are on Bedford Square at South 12th Street.

WESA's transmitter is located on Shiloh Street at Grandview Avenue in Pittsburgh. WESA broadcasts in HD Radio; its HD2 subchannel plays jazz and the HD3 subchannel carries the BBC World Service. Programming is also heard on four FM translators in Western Pennsylvania; by way of three of those translators, the station is also the NPR member for the Johnstown area.

== History ==
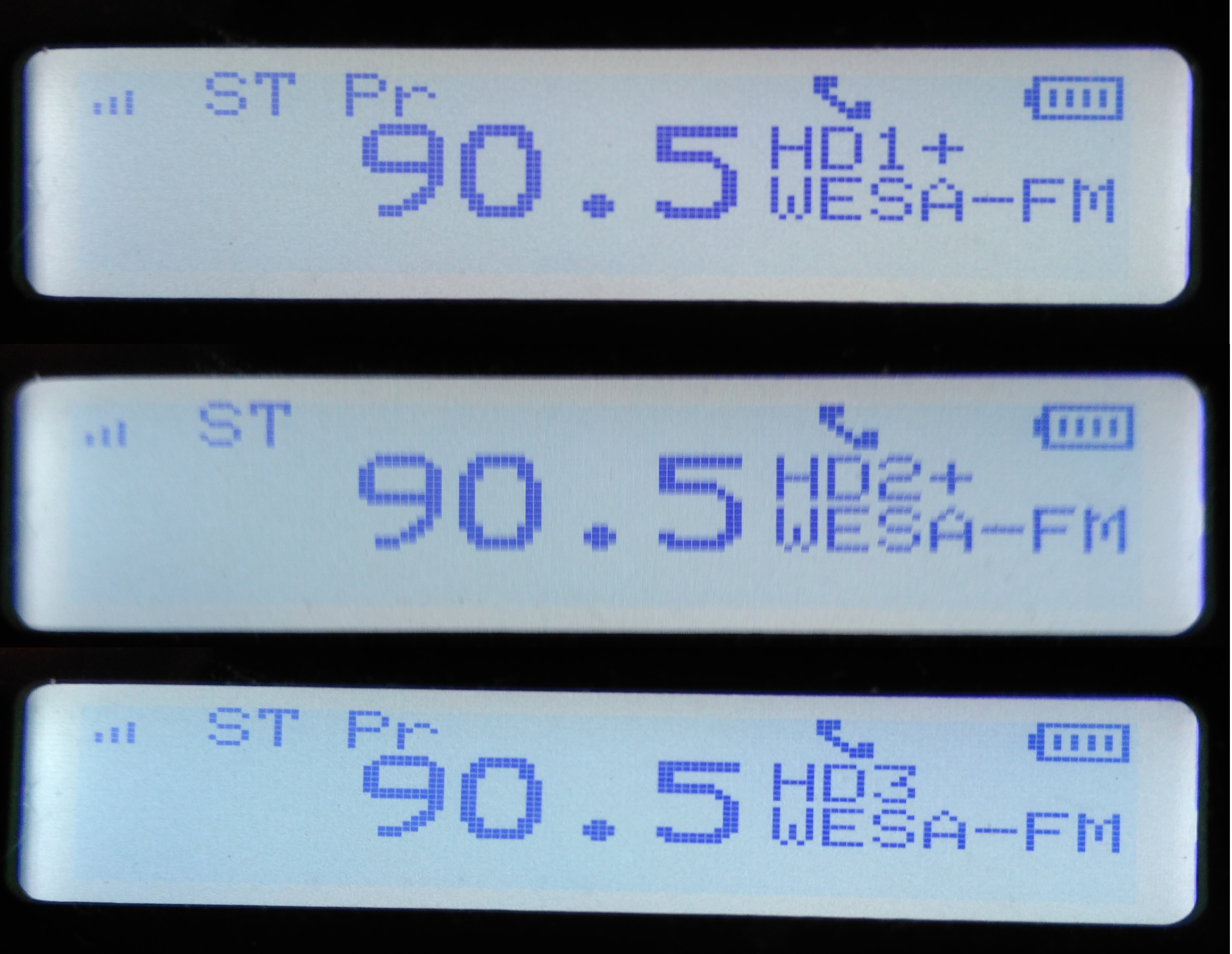
WESA's HD Radio Channels on a SPARC Radio with PSD.

=== Early years ===
The station signed on the air on December 15, 1949, as WDUQ, owned by Duquesne University. It originally served as a student laboratory on the Duquesne campus, helping students train for careers in broadcasting and gave local audiences access to cultural programs and information.

WDUQ became a member of National Public Radio in the 1970s. As NPR national shows were rolled out, they were added to the WDUQ schedule, including All Things Considered and Morning Edition as well as the popular weekend show, Car Talk. The station also had a significant local and regional news effort, including in-depth coverage of a variety of issues. The station produced and distributed programming heard on other public radio stations nationwide. WDUQ was also known as the main radio outlet for jazz music in Pittsburgh.

=== Radio Information Service ===
The station began carrying the programming of the newly formed Radio Information Service in 1976, a reading service for the visually impaired and print-handicapped. The service broadcast on a subsidiary communications authority (SCA) subchannel, only available on some FM receivers. WDUQ entered into a management agreement to handle RIS's day-to-day business operations in late 2005. In Fall 2001, WDUQ was the most listened-to public radio outlet in Pittsburgh.

In 2006, WDUQ began to give several distant communities a local signal. FM translators now relay WDUQ programming on 100.5 MHz in Johnstown, Pennsylvania; 104.1 MHz in Somerset, Pennsylvania; 92.3 MHz in New Baltimore, Pennsylvania serving the Pennsylvania Turnpike; and 104.1 MHz in Ligonier, Pennsylvania.

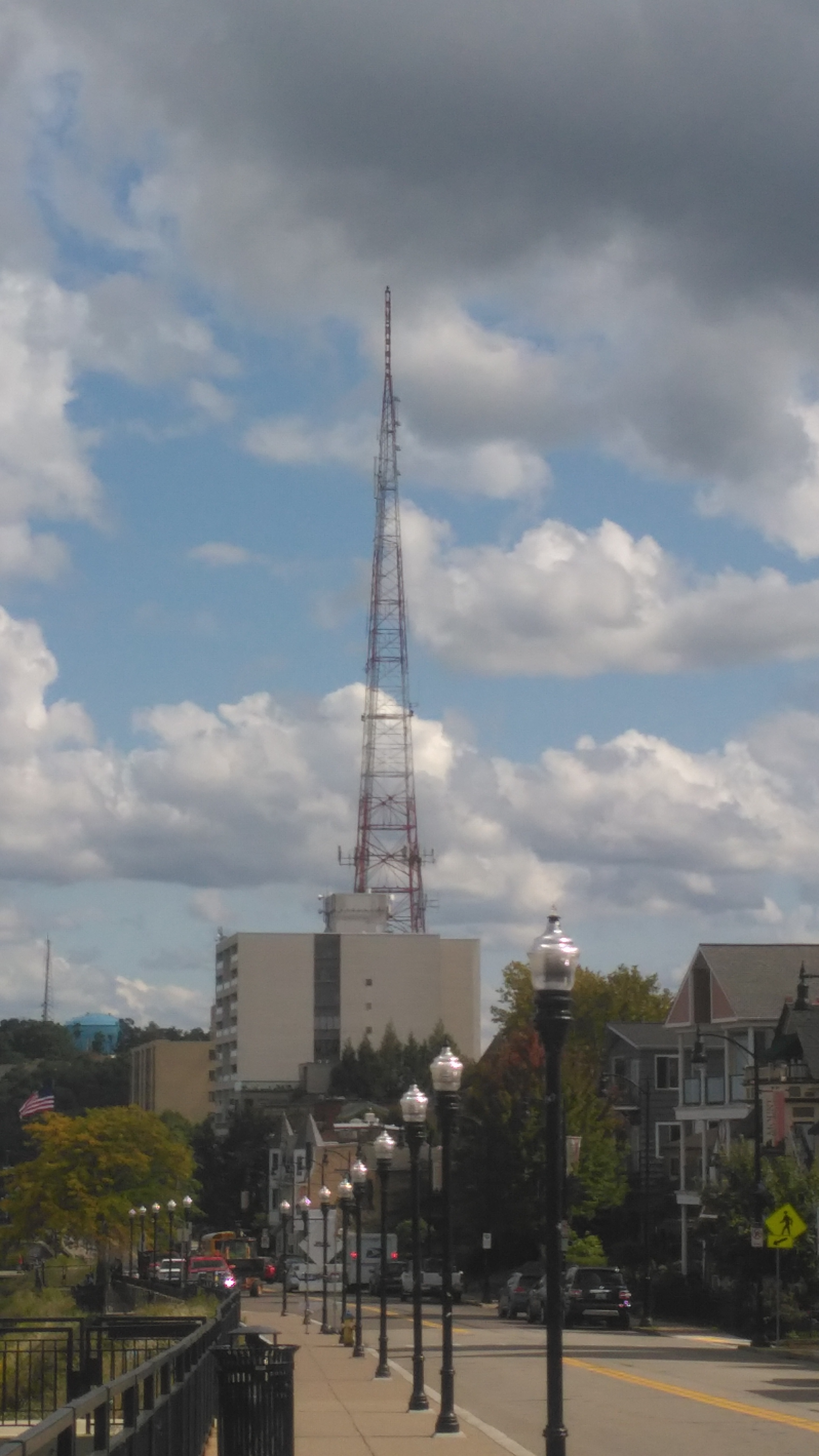
WESA-FM's Tower atop Mount Washington

=== Planned Parenthood controversy ===
In October, 2007, WDUQ sparked controversy regarding the corporate underwriting it received from Planned Parenthood of Western Pennsylvania. In exchange for a gift of more than $5,000, WDUQ began airing a series of public service announcements (PSAs) for Planned Parenthood on October 8, 2007.

The messages focused on breast and cervical cancer screening, STD treatment, and abstinence education. They did not mention abortion-related services. Planned Parenthood, however, is the largest provider of abortions in the United States. On October 10, Duquesne University President Dr. Charles J. Dougherty ordered the station to return the money and cease airing the PSAs, citing conflict with the university's Catholic identity.

=== Sale and rebranding ===
Duquesne University announced in January 2010 that it would be searching for options to sell WDUQ. According to a spokesperson for the university, "Over the years, WDUQ has evolved into a station that is virtually independent of the university. This could be an opportunity for Duquesne to reallocate assets for the enhancement of our educational enterprise and for the station to thrive on its own". Duquesne University decided to find a qualified buyer for WDUQ and its related frequencies.

On January 14, 2011, the university accepted an offer from Essential Public Media, a joint venture between WYEP and Public Media Company, a subsidiary of public media proponent, brokerage and consultancy Public Radio Capital. Proceeds of the sale were to support new Duquesne University endowed chairs in African Studies and Mission Studies. The proceeds would also pay for stipends for graduate students and "scholarships to increase diversity in the student body". The station's production facility moved to WYEP's Community Broadcast Center on the South Side and back-office functions were combined. WDUQ adopted a new call sign, WESA, upon the completion of the sale.

On July 1, 2011, the new management eliminated much of the jazz programming on weekdays. The station now has an all news-talk-information format, while adding a full-time jazz station on its HD Radio digital subchannel. On September 15, 2011 the sale was finalized. The station began operating under the branding "Essential Public Radio" for several months in 2012 before adopting the WESA call letters as the primary brand.

== Programming ==
WESA airs all news and information programs on weekdays from NPR and other public radio networks, including Morning Edition, All Things Considered, Fresh Air, Here and Now, On Point, 1A, Think and Marketplace. The WESA newsroom provides local news updates during the day. The BBC World Service runs overnight. Jazz is featured on Saturday nights.

== Translators ==
Call sign	Frequency	City of license	FID	ERP (W)	Class	FCC info
W263AW	100.5 FM	Johnstown, Pennsylvania	140931	10	D	LMS
W281AI	104.1 FM	Ligonier, Pennsylvania	140966	13	D	LMS
W222AP	92.3 FM	New Baltimore, Pennsylvania	140904	10	D	LMS
W281AH	104.1 FM	Somerset, Pennsylvania	140951	13	D	LMS
