= WIUP-FM =

Radio station at Indiana University of Pennsylvania

- Indiana, Pennsylvania; United States
- Frequency: 90.1 MHz

Programming
- Format: Freeform

Ownership
- Owner: Indiana University of Pennsylvania

History
- First air date: October 9, 1969
- Former frequencies: 91.3 MHz (1969–1980)
- Call sign meaning: Indiana University of Pennsylvania

Technical information
- Licensing authority: FCC
- Facility ID: 28604
- Class: A
- ERP: 1,500 watts Non-Directional
- HAAT: 27.0 meters
- Transmitter coordinates: 40°36′57.00″N 79°9′40.00″W

Links
- Public license information: Public file; LMS
- Website: www.wiupfm.org

WIUP-FM (90.1 FM) is the student-run radio station of Indiana University of Pennsylvania in Indiana, Pennsylvania, United States. The station is currently owned by Indiana University of Pennsylvania and is run by the faculty and students of the university.

== History ==
In 1968, IUP applied for a construction permit to build a new radio station at 91.3 MHz, broadcasting with 1,600 watts. The new station was initially slated to broadcast from the Learning Research Center, at that time under construction. WIUP-FM signed on for the first time on October 9, 1969, from its Davis Hall studios.

WIUP-FM relocated frequencies to 90.1 MHz in 1980. This move was a requirement of a facility upgrade for WYEP-FM in Pittsburgh, which at the same time was approved move from 91.5 to 91.3 and increased its effective radiated power.

== Programming ==
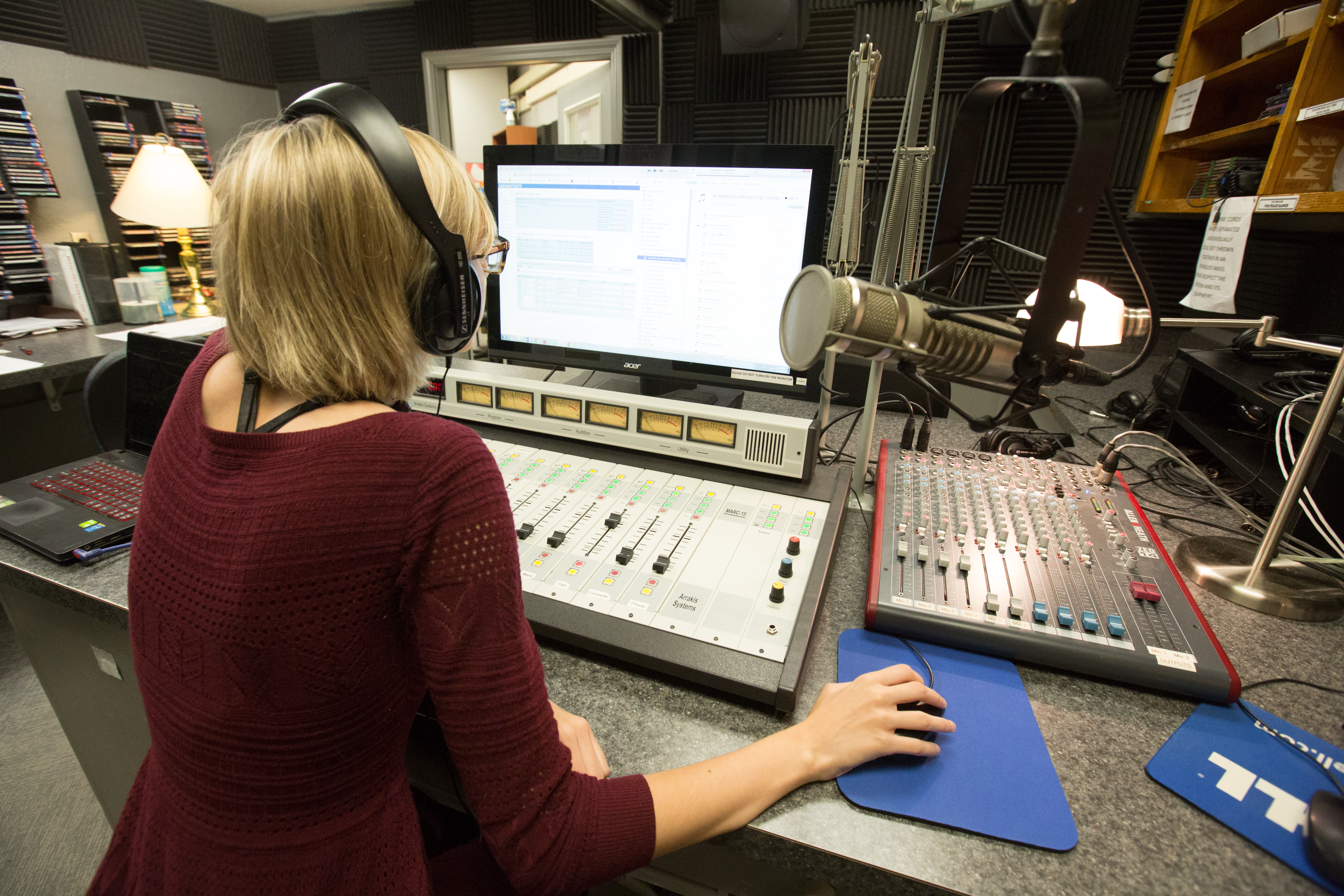
WIUP-FM's studio in the basement of Davis Hall

IUP students from across the campus host and produce shows, plan and execute promotional events, and manage social media accounts. Student managers supervise and train other students and coordinate the program schedule. The station's eclectic format includes a wide selection of musical genres including jazz, rock, pop, rap, and classical. The station is supervised by a faculty member from the IUP Department of Communications Media.

== See also ==
- Campus radio
- List of college radio stations in the United States
