= WYEP-FM =

Public radio station in Pittsburgh

Coordinates: 40.4117°N 79.9312°W

- Pittsburgh, Pennsylvania; United States
- Frequency: 91.3 MHz (HD Radio)
- Branding: 91.3 WYEP

Programming
- Format: Adult album alternative (AAA)

Ownership
- Owner: Pittsburgh Community Broadcasting Corp.
- Sister stations: WESA WESD

History
- First air date: April 30, 1974 (at 91.5)
- Former frequencies: 91.5 MHz (1974–1983)

Technical information
- Facility ID: 52745
- Class: B1
- ERP: 18,000 watts
- HAAT: 116 meters (381 ft)

Links
- Webcast: Listen Live
- Website: wyep.org

WYEP (91.3 MHz) is a listener-supported, non-commercial radio station that is located in Pittsburgh, Pennsylvania. It carries an Adult Album Alternative (AAA) radio format and is run by the Pittsburgh Community Broadcasting Corporation, along with 90.5 WESA. The studios and offices are located on Bedford Square at South 12th Street. WYEP-FM holds periodic fundraisers to support the station.

WYEP-FM has an effective radiated power (ERP) of 18,000 watts. The transmitter is on Longview Street in Pittsburgh.

== History ==
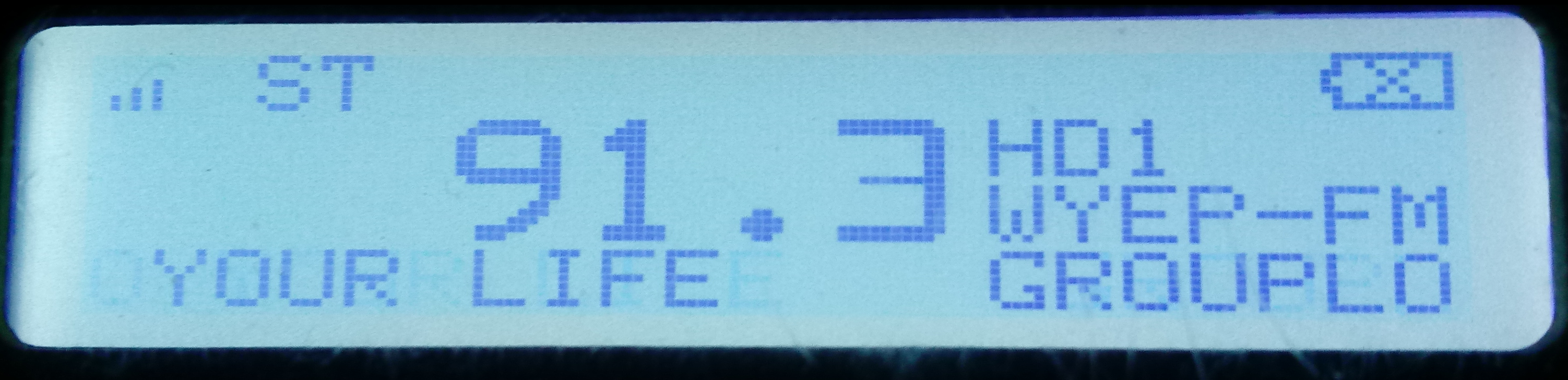
WYEP on a SPARC HD Radio receiver with PSD.

WYEP was located in the South Oakland area of Pittsburgh in the former police horse stable at 4 Cable Place. It began broadcasting on April 30, 1974, on 91.5 MHz. Prior to using its own frequency, the Pittsburgh Community Broadcasting Corporation (the licensee which was incorporated in 1972 solely for the purpose of building and operating a community based, non-commercial radio station) produced three hourly music and public affairs programs under agreement with WDUQ 90.5. The programs scheduled at 4 p.m. provided an example of the content WYEP would broadcast. The radio station studios were built by volunteers.

During the station's early days, it was principally operated by volunteers knowledgeable in music or an area of public affairs.

In 1979, WYEP filed to move to 91.3 MHz and upgrade its signal to 18 kW. Transmission facilities were moved from atop the Cathedral of Learning on the University of Pittsburgh campus to a tower above the Monongahela River near Hazelwood. The move became effective in 1983 and also saw WIUP-FM 91.3 in Indiana move to 90.1.

In 1987, the station reorganized and relocated its broadcast facility to the campus of Chatham University in Pittsburgh's East End. In 1994, the station moved to Birmingham Place on the South Side of Pittsburgh.

In early 2006, the station began broadcasting from the new WYEP Community Broadcast Center, located in the Bedford Square section of Pittsburgh's South Side. In September 2006, the WYEP Community Broadcast Center received a LEED-NC Silver rating, making it environmentally friendly and "the first green station in the nation".

In 2011, WYEP purchased the license for WDUQ from Duquesne University, and launched an NPR News and information format station, 90.5 WESA. The staff and management of 90.5 WESA were co-located at the Community Broadcast Center. In 2014, WYEP celebrated its 40th anniversary on the air.

In 2016, the boards of WYEP and WESA merged, becoming the Pittsburgh Community Broadcasting Corp.

WYEP currently broadcasts and streams music programming twenty-four hours per day.

== Programs ==
- Dubmission - Produced and hosted by Kerem Gokmen, for the past 25 years on WYEP, beginning in 1998. Dubmission's format is a mix of glitch, house, techno, soul, funk, jazz, offbeat, leftfield, hip hop, dub, downtempo, disco, broken beat, and rare grooves, just to name a few. Featuring guest mixes and in studio performances and visits by artists such as Booka Shade, RJD2, Bob Sinclar, Thomas Cox, Scuba, Shawn Rudiman, Bonobo, DJ Vadim, Byron the Aquarius and many more. A signature of the show has been in offering a wide variety of music; often playing tracks that are strictly released on vinyl record only.

== Hosts ==
- Kerem Gokmen - DJ with WYEP since 1997. Kerem has produced and hosted a long standing free-form electronic music based variety mix show, every Saturday overnight into Sunday morning, for the past 25 years, called Dubmission.

== See also ==
- List of community radio stations in the United States
