= WPKL =

Radio station in Uniontown, Pennsylvania

- Uniontown, Pennsylvania; United States
- Broadcast area: Pittsburgh
- Frequency: 99.3 MHz
- Branding: Pickle 99.3

Programming
- Format: Classic hits
- Affiliations: Westwood One

Ownership
- Owner: Forever Media (sale to Broadcast Communications pending); (FM Radio Licenses, LLC)
- Sister stations: WOGG

History
- First air date: December 20, 1968
- Former call signs: WPQR-FM (1968–2001)
- Call sign meaning: Pickle

Technical information
- Licensing authority: FCC
- Facility ID: 33828
- Class: A
- ERP: 3,000 watts
- HAAT: 90 meters (300 ft)
- Transmitter coordinates: 39°53′9.3″N 79°46′28.2″W

Links
- Public license information: Public file; LMS
- Webcast: Listen live
- Website: www.foreverpittsburgh.com/pickle99-3/

WPKL (99.3 FM) is a radio station licensed to Uniontown, Pennsylvania, United States, featuring a classic hits format branded as "The Pickle". Until 2026, WPKL's programming was simulcast on WKPL in Ellwood City, Pennsylvania, at 92.1 FM.

== History ==
WPKL first signed on the air December 20, 1968 as WPQR-FM, licensed to Warman Broadcasting Inc.; founded by Edwin Warman, with Ed Olesh serving as the station's first vice president and general manager. For many of its early years, the station operated from an office building at 540 Morgantown Road in Uniontown.

WPQR was purchased by Pittsburgh attorney Geoffrey P. Kelly on May 21, 1987, who operated the station under the corporate name Kel Com Broadcasting, Inc. The Kel Com endeavor was a joint partnership between Kelly and Monroeville broadcaster Marlene J. Heshler, who had bought WCVI (AM) in nearby Connellsville (as Mar Com Broadcasting) two years before. For many years following the sale, WPQR maintained a separate sales office in Uniontown, with on-air operations moving to WCVI's facilities at 133 East Crawford Avenue in downtown Connellsville.

The early 1990s marked a period of financial distress for WPQR, but the circumstances surrounding it are still unknown. Heshler and Kelly dissolved their partnership in 1991, but Heshler stayed on as General Manager for WPQR and sister station WCVI for a couple of years afterward, with Kelly taking ownership and control of both WCVI and WPQR. Heshler left those stations for good by 1994. At around the time of the dissolution, legal action had been taken against both stations by ASCAP/BMI over alleged unpaid music licensing fees.

WPQR would carry an adult contemporary format until 1999, when the station suddenly went dark. According to the Pittsburgh Tribune-Review, the transmitter had broken down and no money was available to fix it. To complicate matters even further, when the money became available, engineers were not permitted on the property where the transmitter and tower were located to make repairs because Kel Com had lapsed on its rental payments for the leased site. Complicating matters further than that, the property was owned by Fayette County court judge Gerald Solomon. It also became known that Kel Com/Mar Com had also owed its employees back wages, including its succeeding General Manager, who had assumed Heshler's former duties.

WPQR and WCVI were totally automated by this time, using the services of Jones Radio Network's AC format for WPQR, and Music of Your Life for WCVI, offering little in the way of full-service programming elements, as much of the airstaff had left the station after not being paid.

Nevertheless, some of the station's employees, who were still owed the back wages, continued to work for free in a loyal, dedicated effort to keep both stations afloat through WCVI, which still remained on the air, even working in inhumane conditions, such as the heat being turned off in the building, due to a lapse in utility bill payments. WPQR and WCVI were eventually forced to move to a ground floor office at 131 East Crawford Avenue in the same building, as the second and third floor offices at 133 East Crawford were deemed unsafe by the state Health Department, due largely to a tree growing out of the back of the building that was compromising its structural integrity.

WPQR was also issued an FCC monetary forfeiture of $20,000 in March 2000 for tower marking and registration violations, as well as failing to install new EAS equipment, which replaced the former EBS system. The licenses for both WCVI and WPQR were turned over to bankruptcy receiver Robert H. Slone of Greensburg in August of that same year.

Both stations were sold in a bankruptcy bid sale in November 2000 for $475,000, along with the WCVI tower site.

Keymarket took WCVI off the air and immediately began work to overhaul the transmitter sites of both it and WPQR, restoring both to the air in August 2001. Keymarket successfully applied for the new call letters WPKL, to represent its new format flip to oldies, via ABC's Oldies Radio, as "The Pickle". WCVI returned under the new call letters WPNT (WPNT later changed to WYJK), and simulcasts WPKL. No real information on why "The Pickle" was chosen as their name (it's believed that the name was an homage to Pittsburgh's Heinz foods, which also produces pickles), but it is one-of-a-kind. WPKL simulcasts on co-owned WKPL-FM 92.1 in Ellwood City, Pennsylvania.

Upon the sale, WPKL and WYJK moved its operations out of the Crawford Avenue building to the building housing its sister stations along Route 88 in California, Pennsylvania, just north of Brownsville. The Crawford Avenue building was later sold and razed, later being replaced with a new single-story office building.

== WPKL today ==
In August 2001, Keymarket hired Robert "Fish" Herring as their new morning DJ. Herring previously worked at Washington County oldies competitor WJPA. Herring left the station in 2012. The morning show was then hosted by longtime Pittsburgh radio personality Phil Kirzyc, the Kielbasi Kid. Currently, Kalen Boyd is the morning show host.

Following the morning show, WPKL airs Classic Hits programming from Westwood One using Storq technology.

In June 2026, 92.1 WKPL The Pickle became WCGF and joined the Family Life Ministries network. The Pickle classic hits format continues on WPKL at 99.3 FM in Uniontown.
