= New Baltimore Bridge =

- U.S. National Register of Historic Places
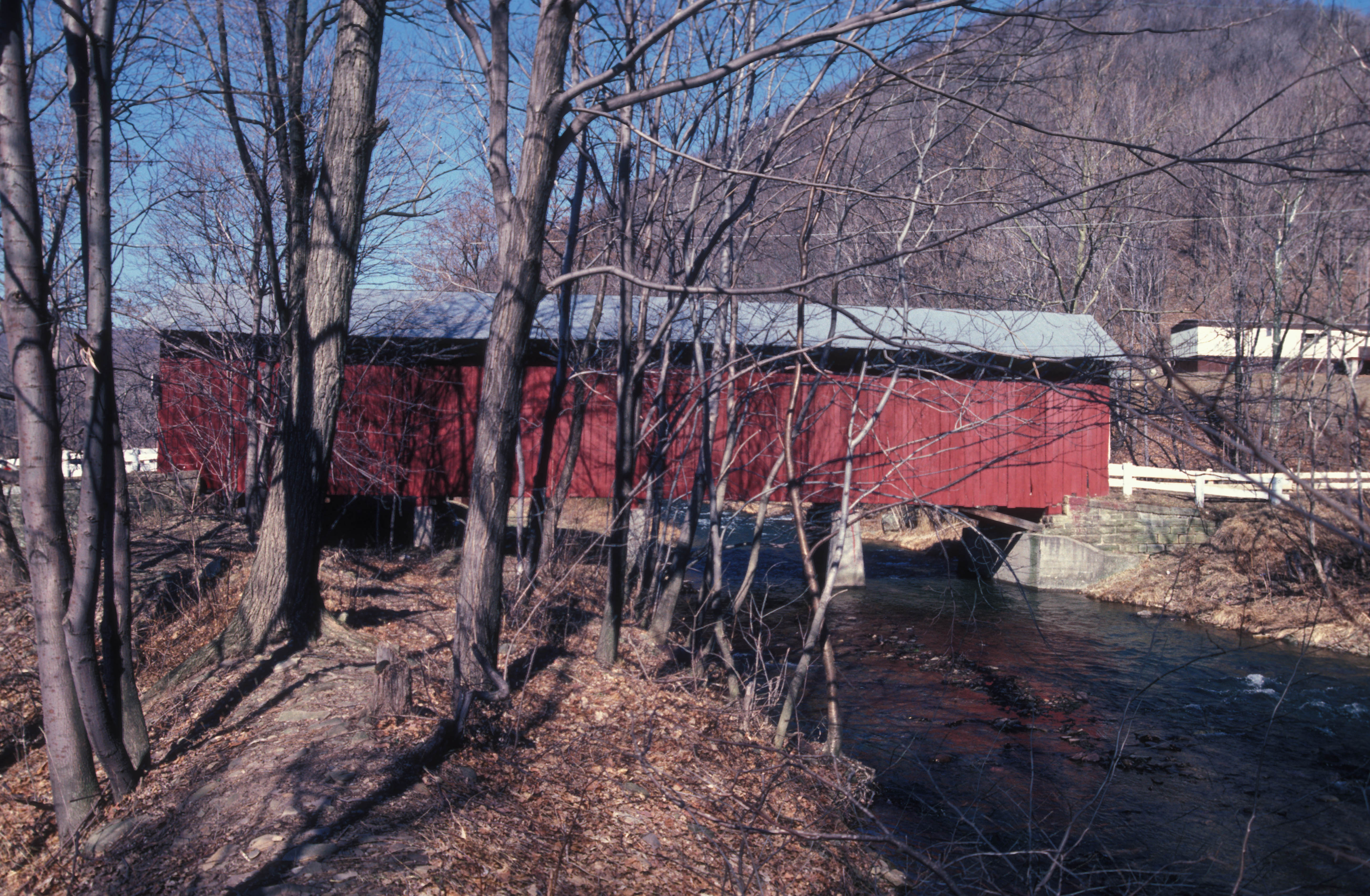

- Location within Pennsylvania Location within the United States
- Location: Off of Juniata Street over the Raystown Branch Juniata River, Allegheny Township, Pennsylvania
- Coordinates: 39°59′13″N 78°46′21″W
- Area: 0.1 acres (0.040 ha)
- Built: 1879
- Architectural style: Queenpost truss
- MPS: Covered Bridges of Somerset County TR
- NRHP reference No.: 80003630
- Added to NRHP: December 10, 1980

The New Baltimore Bridge is a historic covered bridge in Allegheny Township, Somerset County, Pennsylvania. Township Route 812 crosses the Raystown Branch Juniata River on the bridge. The Queenpost truss bridge was built in 1879 and is 86 feet 6 inches (26.37 m) in length and 12 feet (3.7 m) wide. It is one of 10 covered bridges in Somerset County.
