= WCGF-FM =

Radio station in Moon Township, Pennsylvania

- Moon Township, Pennsylvania; United States
- Broadcast area: Pittsburgh and New Castle, Pennsylvania; Steubenville and East Liverpool, Ohio; Weirton, West Virginia
- Frequency: 104.3 MHz

Programming
- Format: Christian radio

Ownership
- Owner: Family Life Network; (Family Life Ministries, Inc.)
- Sister stations: WESD

History
- First air date: April 15, 1959
- Former call signs: WOHI-FM (1959–1967); WRTS (1967–1974); WELA (1974–2000); WOGF (2000–2009); WOGI (2009–2026)

Technical information
- Licensing authority: FCC
- Facility ID: 13711
- Class: B
- ERP: 13,000 watts
- HAAT: 219 meters (719 ft)
- Transmitter coordinates: 40°35′14″N 80°25′15″W
- Translator: 105.5 W288BO (Pittsburgh)

Links
- Public license information: Public file; LMS
- Website: www.familylife.org

WCGF-FM (104.3 FM) is a radio station licensed to Moon Township, Pennsylvania, United States, serving the Pittsburgh Media Market as a Christian radio station for the Family Life Network.

== History ==
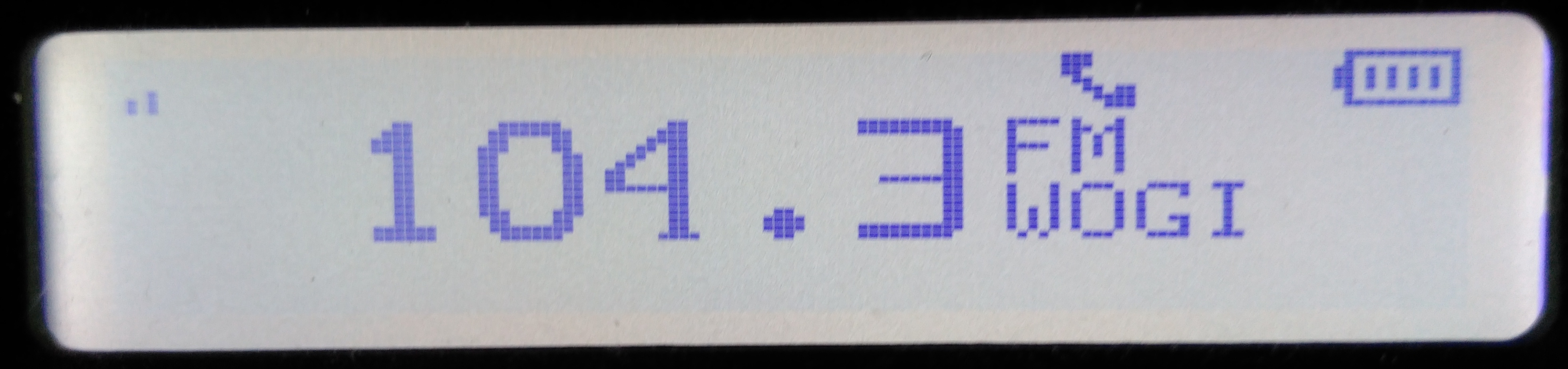
WOGI on a SPARC HD Radio with RDS.

WCGF-FM signed on the air April 15, 1959, as WOHI-FM in East Liverpool, Ohio, the FM sister station of WOHI, both owned by East Liverpool Broadcasting Company. WOHI and WOHI-FM were sold to Constrander Corporation, owned by Joseph D. Coons for $175,000 on December 20, 1960. The acquisition of the stations took effect January 27, 1961. WOHI-FM changed call signs to WRTS in June 1967, signaling the debut of separate programming on a full-time basis; the station adopted a country music format in November 1968. In November 1971, Coons sold both WOHI and WRTS to Frank Mangano for $290,493; however, the name of the company remained the same under the new owner. WRTS changed call signs once again to WELA in May 1974, coinciding with the station's move to easy listening.

By 1981, the easy listening format was dropped in favor of a country format. By the late 1990s, the station had a classic hits format dubbed "Classic Hits 104".

Keymarket purchased both WOHI and WELA in 2000. The new owner changed the callsign to WOGF on July 7, 2000, and adopted a country music format with the "Froggy" moniker; a format which continues today.

WOGF changed its city of license to Moon Township, Pennsylvania, from East Liverpool, Ohio. The tower location remains in Beaver County, Pennsylvania.

WOGF assumed the callsign WOGI in 2009, a callsign that was previously used on WPKV (98.3 FM), a station in Pittsburgh that Keymarket sold to the Educational Media Foundation in 2009.

WOGI was partially simulcast on WOGG in Oliver, Pennsylvania for many years. The two stations had separate morning shows but were simulated throughout the day. In July 2020, the stations combined into a full simulcast are known as Froggy 104.3 and Froggy 94.9.

WOGI dropped all of its local programming outside morning drive in October 2025. As of January 8, 2026, Trisha Tadpole was the weekday morning show personality. The station otherwise carried the Mainstream Country network from Westwood One full time.

On August 5, 2026, Forever Media announced that it would sell WOGI to Family Life Ministries for $1 million. This marked the second deal between the parties; Family Life had closed on its purchase of WKPL in June. The country format remained on WOGG. The sale was completed on September 22. On October 1, 2026, the station changed its call sign to WCGF-FM.
