= WESD =

Radio station in Ellwood City, Pennsylvania

- Ellwood City, Pennsylvania; United States
- Broadcast area: Pittsburgh (Lawrence County)
- Frequency: 92.1 MHz
- Branding: 91.3 WYEP Holiday Pop Up

Programming
- Format: Temporary Christmas Music

Ownership
- Owner: Pittsburgh Community Broadcasting Corporation
- Sister stations: WESA-FM, WYEP-FM

History
- First air date: August 4, 1968
- Former call signs: WFEM (1968–1988); WKST-FM (1988–2000); WJST (2000–2004); WKPL (2004–June 2026); WCGF-FM (June–September 2026)

Technical information
- Licensing authority: FCC
- Facility ID: 24999
- Class: A
- ERP: 2,500 watts
- HAAT: 156 meters (512 ft)
- Transmitter coordinates: 40°46′9.2″N 80°16′55.2″W
- Repeater: 91.3 WYEP-FM HD-2

Links
- Public license information: Public file; LMS
- Website: www.wyep.org/wyep-programming/2026-11-15/holiday-pop-up

WESD (92.1 MHz) is a non-commercial radio station licensed to Ellwood City, Pennsylvania, United States, and serving the Pittsburgh area and Lawrence County. It is currently broadcasting “WYEP Holiday Pop Up” after being acquired by Pittsburgh Community Broadcasting Corporation.

The station will simulcast sister station 90.5 WESA after January 1.

== History ==
WESD first signed on the air as WFEM on August 4, 1968, and was owned by Ellwood City Broadcasting Company, a company owned by Herbert Scott, who also owned Great Scott Broadcasting Company, licensee of WKST in New Castle, about 8 miles (13 km) north of Ellwood City. Studios and offices for WFEM were located at 226 Fifth Street in Ellwood City, from where it broadcast an easy listening music format. In 1986, WFEM came under the control of Faye Scott following the death of Herb Scott in 1984. Not long afterwards, WFEM's operations were moved to those of WKST at 219 Savannah-Garder Road in New Castle. By the end of the 1980s, WFEM changed its call letters to WKST-FM, to mirror that of its AM sister, but adopting the slogan "Star 92.1" after signing an affiliation agreement with the Satellite Music Network and adopting its "Starstation" adult contemporary format.

WKST-FM's call sign was changed to WJST on October 10, 2000, in coordination with WPHH-FM in Pittsburgh becoming WKST-FM, using the KISS-FM. In April 2004, Clear Channel Communications announced the sale of WKST along with WBZY and WJST (FM) to Forever Broadcasting for $2.85 million. On September 20, 2004, the WJST call sign was moved to 1280 AM, and WJST-FM became WKPL.

In April 2026, Family Life Ministries purchased WKPL from Forever Media for $350,000. In June 2026, 92.1 WKPL The Pickle became WCGF-FM and joined the Family Life Network.

In August 2026, it was announced that Pittsburgh Community Broadcasting Corporation would acquire WCGF-FM from Family Life Ministries for $375,000. The sale was consummated on October 30.

In September 2026, the call sign was changed to WESD and WOGI became WCGF-FM on October 1.
