= Harrisburg–Carlisle metropolitan area =

Harrisburg–Carlisle, Pennsylvania MSA Susquehanna Valley
- Metropolitan Statistical Area
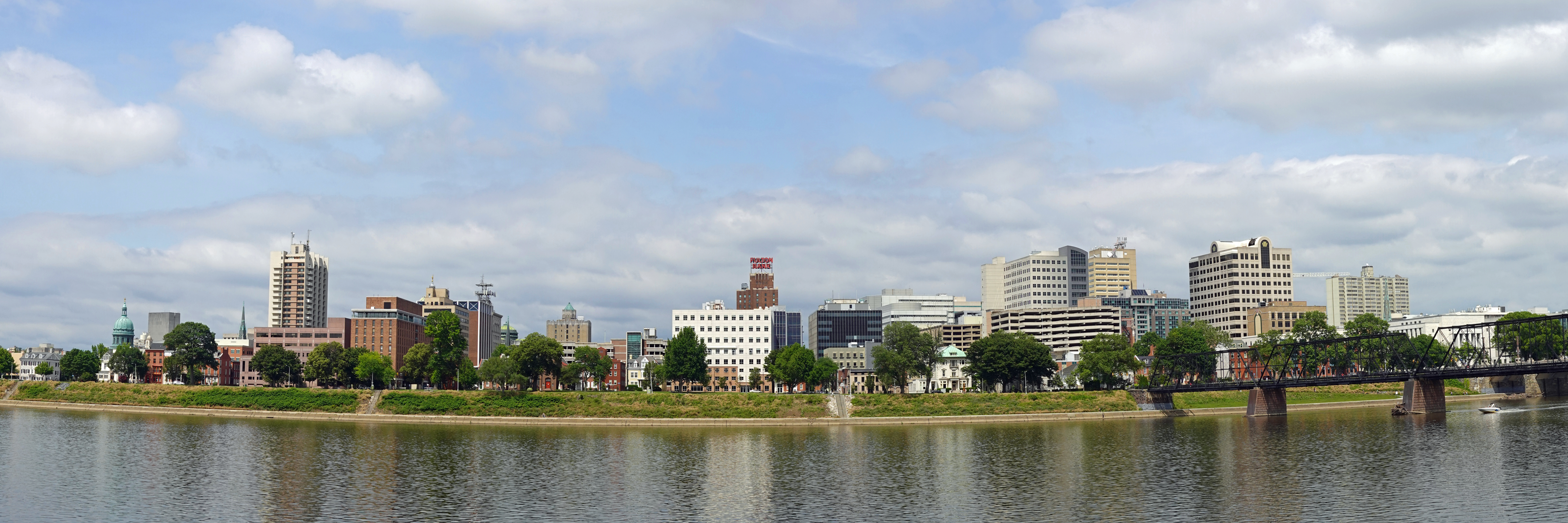
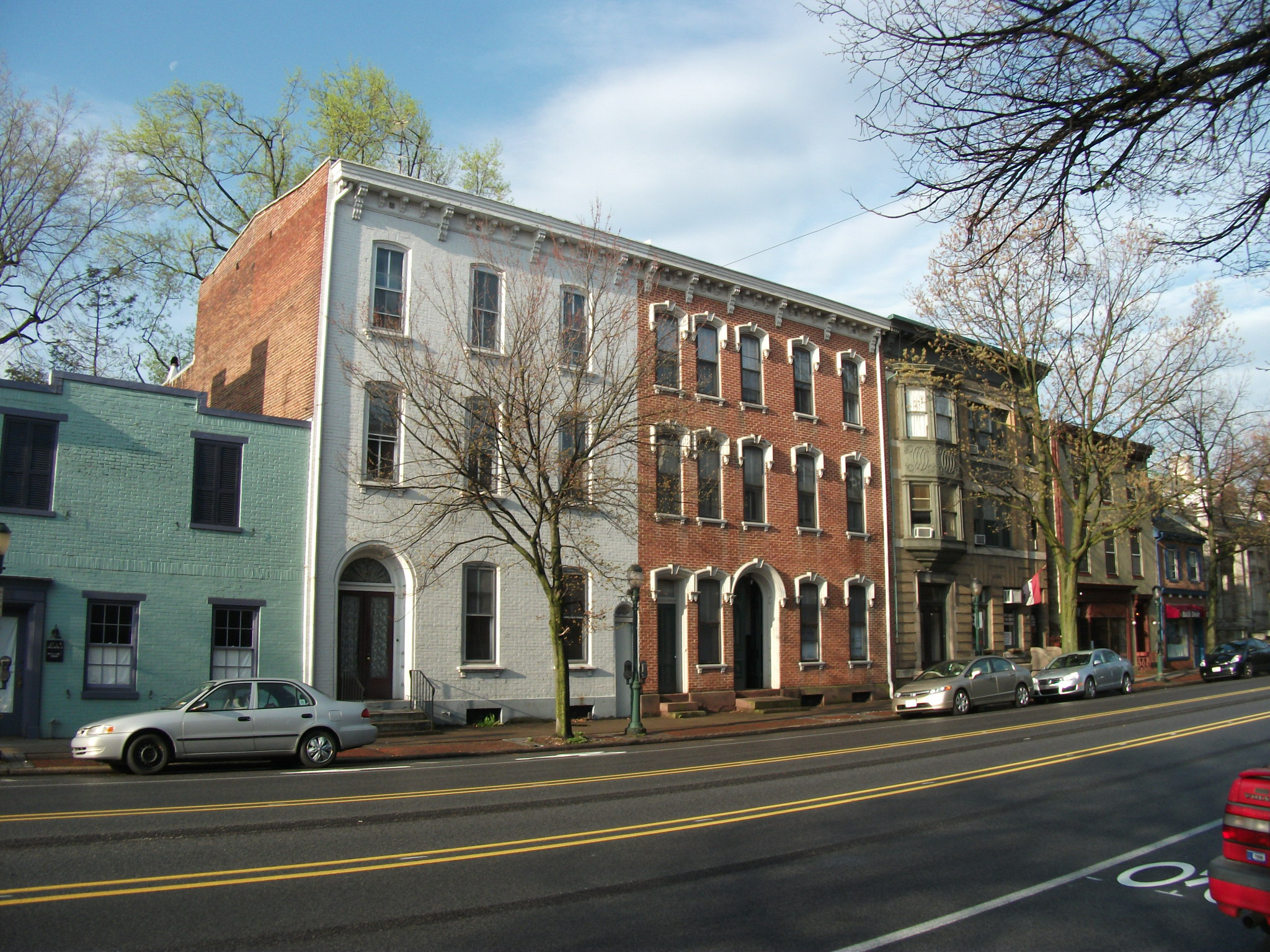
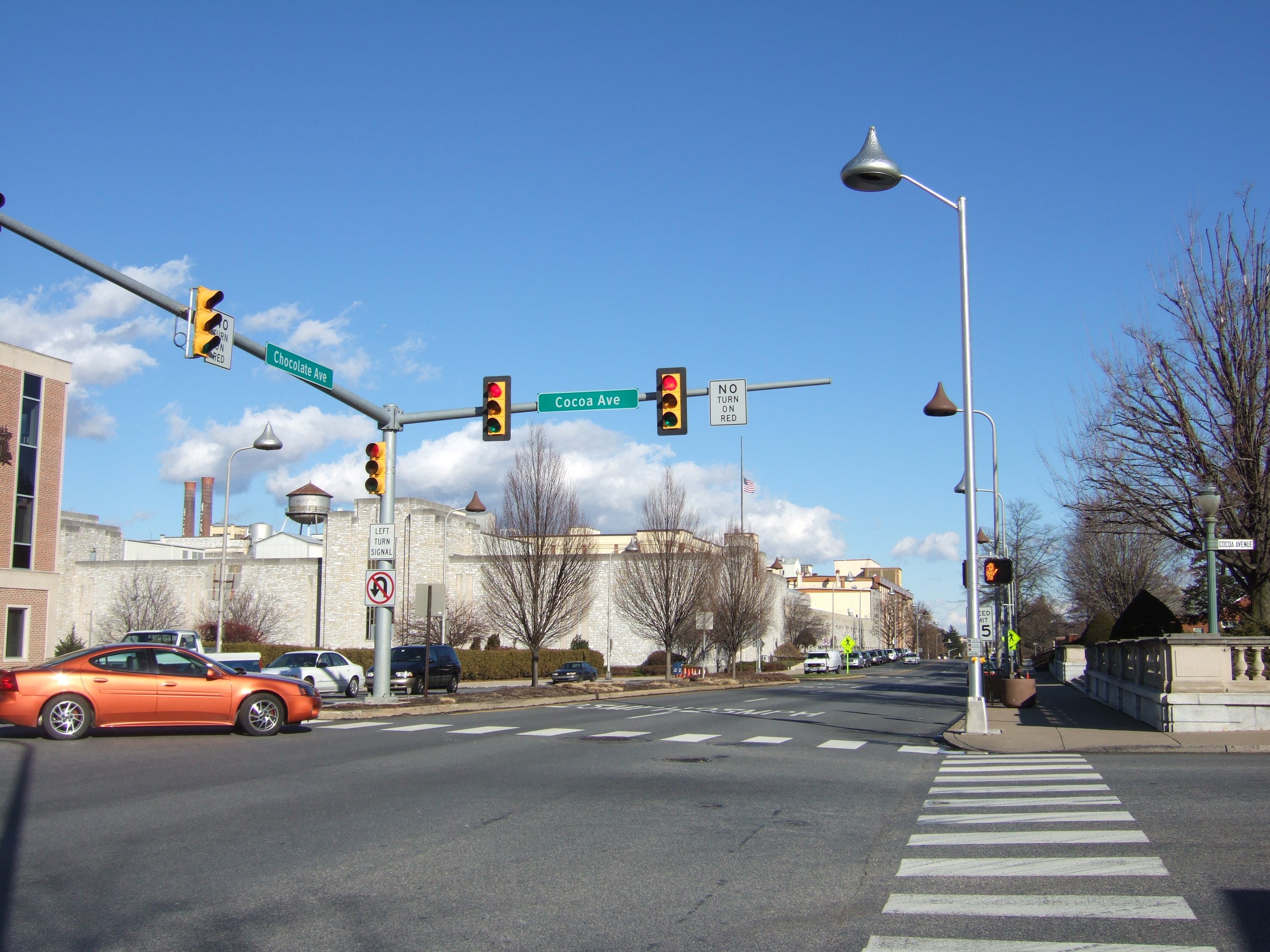
- Clockwise from top left: Harrisburg, Carlisle, and Hershey
Interactive Map of Harrisburg–York–Lebanon
Combined Statistical Area
Harrisburg–Carlisle, PA MSA
Lebanon, PA MSA
Gettysburg, PA MSA
York–Hanover, PA MSA
- Country: United States
- State: Pennsylvania
- Principal cities: Harrisburg; Carlisle

Area
  - Metropolitan Statistical Area: 1,656 sq mi (4,290 km^{2})

Population (2010 est.)
  - Urban: 444,474 (87th)
  - MSA: 549,475 (98th)
  - CSA: 1,271,801 (46th)

GDP
  - MSA: $47.815 billion (2022)
- Time zone: UTC-5 (ET)
  - Summer (DST): UTC-4 (EDT)

The Harrisburg–Carlisle metropolitan statistical area, officially the Harrisburg–Carlisle, PA Metropolitan Statistical Area, and also referred to as the Susquehanna Valley, is defined by the Office of Management and Budget as an area consisting of three counties in South Central Pennsylvania, anchored by the cities of Harrisburg and Carlisle.

As of the 2020 census, the metropolitan statistical area (MSA) had a population of 591,712, making it the fourth-most-populous metropolitan area in Pennsylvania, after the Philadelphia metropolitan area, Greater Pittsburgh, and the Lehigh Valley.

Since 2012, it has been defined as part of the Harrisburg–York–Lebanon combined statistical area, which also includes York, Lebanon, and Adams counties.

== Components ==
The Harrisburg–Carlisle Metropolitan Area consists of three counties, located entirely within the Commonwealth of Pennsylvania. The following three counties are designated as being part of the greater Harrisburg–Carlisle area:

- Cumberland County, Pennsylvania
- Dauphin County, Pennsylvania
- Perry County, Pennsylvania

Officially, Lebanon County is not part of the Harrisburg–Carlisle metropolitan statistical area, and has not been since 2003. It is rather part of combined statistical area, but it is culturally considered to be part of Greater Harrisburg, with Harrisburg suburbs extending into the county.

=== Combined statistical area ===
Additionally, three more counties are included as part of the Harrisburg–York–Lebanon, PA combined statistical area. Collectively, they have a population of 1,271,801 people, making it the 46th-most-populous combined statistical area (CSA) in the United States, and the 3rd-most-populous CSA in the state of Pennsylvania.

- Adams County, Pennsylvania
- Lebanon County, Pennsylvania
- York County, Pennsylvania

=== Statistical history ===
- 1950: The Harrisburg standard metropolitan area (SMA), consisting of Cumberland and Dauphin counties, was first defined.
- 1959: Following a term change by the Bureau of the Budget (present-day Office of Management and Budget), the Harrisburg SMA became the Harrisburg standard metropolitan statistical area (SMSA).
- 1963: Perry County added to the Harrisburg SMSA.
- 1983: Harrisburg SMSA renamed the Harrisburg–Lebanon–Carlisle metropolitan statistical area (MSA); Lebanon County added to the MSA.
- 2003: MSA split into two separate metropolitan areas – Harrisburg–Carlisle metropolitan statistical area (Cumberland, Dauphin, and Perry counties) and the Lebanon metropolitan statistical area (Lebanon County); Both MSAs together form the Harrisburg–Carlisle–Lebanon combined statistical area.
- 2010: The Harrisburg–York–Lebanon urban agglomeration area is defined for the first time, linking York County to the CSA.
- 2012: The Harrisburg–York–Lebanon combined statistical area was formally defined and includes the counties of York and Adams.

== Geography and climate ==
=== Geography ===
Harrisburg–Carlisle is located in the Susquehanna River's valley, which makes the terrain rolling, with occasional flat land and tall hills. The metropolitan area is underlain with limestone, which makes the land ideal for farming. Much of the region is within the piedmont region of the United States.

=== Climate ===
The Harrisburg metropolitan area has a humid continental climate, experiencing four mild seasons: summer, autumn, winter, and spring. The average high temperature is 62 °F, while the average low is 44 °F. Harrisburg receives about 41 inches of rainfall annually.

== Communities ==
Places with more than 40,000 inhabitants

- Harrisburg (Principal City)

Places with 10,000 to 20,000 inhabitants

- Carlisle
- Hershey
- Colonial Park

Places with 1,000 to 10,000 inhabitants

- Progress
- Mechanicsburg
- Middletown
- Camp Hill
- New Cumberland
- Lower Allen
- Linglestown
- Enola
- Steelton
- Shippensburg
- Paxtonia
- Schlusser
- Lemoyne
- Hummelstown
- Rutherford
- Skyline View
- Lawnton
- Boiling Springs
- Wormleysburg
- Penbrook
- Shippensburg University
- Millersburg
- Marysville
- Highspire
- Messiah College
- Mount Holly Springs
- Lykens
- Newport
- Shiremanstown
- Paxtang
- Duncannon
- Elizabethville
- Bressler
- Williamstown
- Newville
- Palmdale
- West Fairview
- New Bloomfield
- Enhaut

Places with fewer than 1,000 inhabitants

- Liverpool
- Wiconsico
- Royalton
- Halifax
- Dauphin
- Gratz
- Millerstown
- Oberlin
- Lenkerville
- New Kingstown
- Union Deposit
- Plainfield
- Berrysburg
- Newburg
- Pillow
- Blain
- Landisburg
- New Buffalo

== Demographics ==
Historical population
Census	Pop.	Note	%±
1990	474,242		—
2000	509,074		7.3%
2010	549,475		7.9%
2020	591,712		7.7%
US Decennial Census

As of the 2000 census, there were 509,074 people, 202,380 households, and 134,557 families residing within the MSA. The racial makeup of the MSA was 86.20% White, 9.39% African American, 0.15% Native American, 1.68% Asian, 0.03% Pacific Islander, 1.17% from other races, and 1.37% from two or more races. Hispanic or Latino people of any race were 2.67% of the population.

The median income for a household in the MSA was $43,374, and the median income for a family was $51,792. Males had a median income of $36,368 versus $26,793 for females. The per capita income for the MSA was $21,432.

In 2009, the urban population of the MSA increased to 383,008 from 362,782 in 2000, a change of 20,226 people.

County	2025 estimate	2020 Census	Change	Area	Density
Dauphin County	293,351	286,401	+2.43%	558 mi^{2} (1,450 km^{2})	526/sq mi (203/km^{2})
Cumberland County	277,270	259,469	+6.86%	550 mi^{2} (1,400 km^{2})	504/sq mi (195/km^{2})
Perry County	46,806	45,842	+2.10%	556 mi^{2} (1,440 km^{2})	84/sq mi (33/km^{2})
Total	617,427	591,712	+4.35%	1,664 mi^{2} (4,310 km^{2})	530/sq mi (205/km^{2})

== Transportation ==
=== Roads and highways ===
The Harrisburg–Carlisle metropolitan area is served by a number of interstates, US routes, and state highways that help facilitate the movement of people and goods throughout the region. Major routes in the region include:

- I-76 / Penna Turnpike
- I-81
- I-83
- I-283
- US 11
- US 15
- US 22
- US 209
- US 322
- US 422
- PA 17
- PA 25
- PA 34
- PA 39
- PA 74
- PA 94
- PA 104
- PA 114
- PA 147
- PA 174
- PA 225
- PA 230
- PA 233
- PA 235
- PA 274
- PA 283
- PA 325
- PA 341
- PA 441
- PA 443
- PA 465
- PA 533
- PA 581
- PA 641
- PA 696
- PA 743
- PA 849
- PA 850
- PA 944
- PA 997
- Airport Connector

=== Air ===
Harrisburg International Airport (MDT) is the primary airport for the Harrisburg–Carlisle area. Located in Middletown, the airport serviced 1.137 million passengers in 2017. It is Pennsylvania's 3rd-busiest airport. It is owned and operated by the Susquehanna Area Regional Airport Authority, which also operates several other airports throughout South Central Pennsylvania.

Some residents use Baltimore/Washington, Ronald Reagan Washington, and Philadelphia airports for a wider selection of destinations and airlines.

=== Rail ===
Harrisburg–Carlisle is served by Amtrak's Keystone Service and Pennsylvanian. Amtrak's Keystone Service, which terminates at Harrisburg Transportation Center, allows for rail trips to points east, including Philadelphia and New York City. The Pennsylvanian connects Harrisburg–Carlisle with Pittsburgh and New York City (by way of Philadelphia).

Currently, the Harrisburg–Carlisle region is not served by any commuter rail; however, there were plans to bring it to the metropolitan and combined statistical areas. Plans included a commuter rail line, called the Capital Red Rose Corridor, running from Lancaster to Harrisburg, with a possible extension to Carlisle.

=== Bus ===
The region is interconnected by bus services, which offer service for local and regional trips, as well as for intercity trips. The primary bus service provider for the region is Capital Area Transit (CAT). CAT provides local and commuter bus service in eastern Cumberland and southern Dauphin counties. Its services are used by about 8,000 daily riders. Intercity bus service is primarily provided by Greyhound Lines and Fullington Trailways.

== Colleges and universities ==
The Harrisburg–Carlisle metropolitan area is home to several universities. The following is a list of non-profit colleges and universities within Harrisburg–Carlisle:

=== Cumberland County ===
- Central Penn College
- Dickinson College
- Messiah University
- Penn State Dickinson School of Law
- Shippensburg University of Pennsylvania
- United States Army War College

=== Dauphin County ===
- HACC, Central Pennsylvania's Community College (Harrisburg Campus)
- Harrisburg University of Science and Technology
- Penn State College of Medicine
- Penn State Harrisburg
- Widener University Commonwealth Law School

== Media ==
The Harrisburg–Carlisle metropolitan area is located entirely within the Harrisburg–York–Lebanon media market. It is the 42nd largest in the United States, with 772,810 households as of 2021.

=== Newspapers ===
- The Patriot-News
- Central Penn Business Journal
- Press and Journal
- Carlisle Sentinel

=== Television ===
The Harrisburg TV market is served by:

- WGAL – (NBC)
- WXBU – (Comet)
- WHBG-TV – cable-only, public access
- WHP-TV – (CBS)
- WHTM-TV – (ABC)
- WCZS-LD – (CTVN)
- WITF-TV – (PBS)
- WPMT – (Fox)
- WLYH – independent, religious
- PCN-TV, is a cable television network dedicated to 24-hour coverage of government and public affairs in the commonwealth.
- Roxbury News –independent news

=== Radio ===
The Harrisburg area's radio market is ranked 78th in the nation.

This is a list of FM stations in the Harrisburg–Carlisle metropolitan area:

Callsign	MHz	Band	"Name", format, owner	City of license
WDCV	88.3	FM	Indie/College Rock, Dickinson College	Carlisle
WXPH	88.7	FM	WXPN relay, University of Pennsylvania	Harrisburg
WSYC	88.7	FM	Alternative, Shippensburg University	Shippensburg
WITF-FM	89.5	FM	NPR	Harrisburg
WVMM	90.7	FM	Indie/College Rock, Messiah College	Grantham
WJAZ	91.7	FM	WRTI relay, Classical/Jazz, Temple University	Harrisburg
WKHL	92.1	FM	"K-Love" Contemporary Christian	Palmyra
WPPY	92.7	FM	"Happy 92.7" Adult Contemporary	Starview
WTPA-FM	93.5	FM	"93.5 WTPA" Classic Rock	Mechanicsburg
WRBT	94.9	FM	"Bob" Country	Harrisburg
WLAN	96.9	FM	"FM 97" CHR	Lancaster
WRVV	97.3	FM	"The River" Classic Hits and the Best of Today's Rock	Harrisburg
WYCR	98.5	FM	"98.5 The Peak" Classic Hits	York
WQLV	98.9	FM	98.9 WQLV	Millersburg
WHKF	99.3	FM	"Kiss-FM" CHR	Harrisburg
WFVY	100.1	FM	Adult Contemporary	Lebanon
WROZ	101.3	FM	"101 The Rose" Hot AC	Lancaster
WARM	103.3	FM	"Warm 103" Hot AC	York
WNNK	104.1	FM	"Wink 104" Hot AC	Harrisburg
WQXA	105.7	FM	"105.7 The X" Active Rock	York
WWKL	106.7	FM	"Hot 106.7" CHR	Hershey
WGTY	107.7	FM	"Great Country"	York

This is a list of AM stations in the Harrisburg–Carlisle metropolitan area:

Callsign	kHz	Band	Format	City of license
WHP (AM)	580	AM	Conservative News/Talk	Harrisburg
WHYF	720	AM	EWTN Global Catholic Radio Network	Shiremanstown
WSBA (AM)	910	AM	News/Talk	York
WADV	940	AM	Gospel	Lebanon
WHYL	960	AM	Adult Standards	Carlisle
WIOO	1000	AM	Classic Country	Carlisle
WKBO	1230	AM	Christian Contemporary	Harrisburg
WQXA	1250	AM	Country	York
WLBR	1270	AM	Talk	Lebanon
WHGB	1400	AM	ESPN Radio (Formerly Adult R&B: The Touch)	Harrisburg
WTKT	1460	AM	sports: "The Ticket"	Harrisburg
WRDD	1480	AM	Country	Shippensburg
WRKY	1490	AM	Classic rock	Lancaster
WPDC	1600	AM	Sport	Elizabethtown
Penndot	1670	AM	NOAA Weather and Travel	Several

== Area codes ==
The entire Harrisburg–Carlisle metropolitan area is served by two area codes:

- 717: area code used in South Central Pennsylvania
- 223: overlay plan with 717 area code

== See also ==
- Pennsylvania statistical areas
- List of Pennsylvania metropolitan areas
- List of United States metropolitan areas
- List of United States combined statistical areas
