= WYCR =

Radio station in York–Hanover, Pennsylvania

- York–Hanover, Pennsylvania; United States
- Broadcast area: Harrisburg–Carlisle metropolitan area
- Frequency: 98.5 MHz
- Branding: Rocky 98-5

Programming
- Language: English
- Format: Classic rock
- Affiliations: Baltimore Ravens; United Stations Radio Networks

Ownership
- Owner: Forever Media (sale to On First Media LLC pending); (FM Radio Licenses, LLC)
- Sister stations: WGTY; WHVR

History
- First air date: 1962
- Former call signs: WHVR-FM (1960–1962)
- Call sign meaning: "York City Radio"

Technical information
- Licensing authority: FCC
- Facility ID: 54608
- Class: B
- ERP: 10,500 watts
- HAAT: 283 meters (928 ft)
- Transmitter coordinates: 39°51′26.4″N 76°56′52.9″W

Links
- Public license information: Public file; LMS
- Webcast: Listen live
- Website: www.foreveryork.com/rocky-98-5/

WYCR (98.5 MHz, "Rocky 98-5") is a commercial FM radio station licensed to York and Hanover, Pennsylvania, United States, serving the Harrisburg–Carlisle metropolitan area. The station is owned by Forever Media, through licensee FM Radio Licenses, LLC, and broadcasts a classic rock format. Its broadcast tower is located near Hanover at (39°51′26.0″N 76°56′53.0″W).

WYCR programming is simulcast on sister station WRKY and WRKY's translator on 92.5 MHz in Lancaster, Pennsylvania.

WYCR airs Nights with Alice Cooper on weekdays and The House of Hair with Dee Snider on Saturdays.

== History ==
The Federal Communications Commission granted Radio Hanover, Inc. a construction permit for the station on June 15, 1960, with the WHVR-FM call sign. The station was granted its first license on December 27, 1962, by which time the call sign had been changed to WYCR.

"98.5 The Peak" logo

On December 14, 2004, the station changed formats from contemporary hit radio (CHR) to classic hits, and switched branding from "98YCR" to "98.5 The Peak".

On March 1, 2016, Radio Hanover Inc. sold WYCR (and WHVR) to Forever Media for $2.6 million. The new owner changed WYCR's format to classic rock and re-branded the station as "Rocky 98-5" on April 25, 2016.

Following the completion of Forever Media's purchase of WONN-FM, WLPA, and WLPA's translator on October 15, 2021, WLPA and its translator began a simulcast of WYCR programming. WLPA’s call sign was subsequently changed to WRKY effective November 1, 2021.

On October 15, 2026, it was announced that Forever Media would sell its York cluster, including WYCR, to York Revolution's On First Media LLC for $3.1 million.

== Signal note ==
WYCR is short-spaced to two other Class B stations:

WKRZ 98.5 KRZ (licensed to serve Freeland, Pennsylvania) operates on the same channel as WYCR and the distance between the stations' transmitters is 110 miles as determined by FCC rules. The minimum distance between two Class B stations operating on the same channel according to current FCC rules is 150 miles.

WMZQ-FM 98.7 WMZQ (licensed to serve Washington, D.C.) operates on 98.7 MHz, a first adjacent channel to WYCR, and the distance between the stations' transmitters is 68 miles as determined by FCC rules. The minimum distance between two Class B stations operating on first adjacent channels according to current FCC rules is 105 miles.
