= WLPA =

WLPA may refer to:

- WRKY (AM), a radio station (1490 AM) licensed to serve Lancaster, Pennsylvania, which held the call sign WLPA from 1979 to 2021
- WPPY, a radio station (92.7 FM) licensed to serve Starview, Pennsylvania, which held the call sign WLPA-FM from 2014 to 2015
