= WSBA =

WSBA may refer to:

- WSBA (AM), a radio station (910 AM) licensed to York, Pennsylvania, United States
- WARM-FM, a radio station (103.3 FM) licensed to York, Pennsylvania, which used the call sign WSBA-FM from 1962 to 1988
- WPMT, a television station (channel 43 analog/47 digital) licensed to York, Pennsylvania, United States, which used the call sign WSBA-TV from 1952 to 1983
- Western Sovereign Base Area, a part of the Akrotiri and Dhekelia on the island of Cyprus
- Washington State Bar Association
