= WZBT =

Radio station at Gettysburg, College

- Gettysburg, Pennsylvania; United States
- Broadcast area: Adams County, Pennsylvania
- Frequency: 91.1 MHz
- Branding: 91.1 WZBT Gettysburg

Programming
- Format: Indie rock Adult album alternative Jazz; Freeform

Ownership
- Owner: Gettysburg College

History
- Founded: 1948
- First air date: October 23, 1978
- Former frequencies: 90.3 MHz (1978–1982)

Technical information
- Licensing authority: FCC
- Facility ID: 24132
- Class: A
- ERP: 350 watts
- HAAT: 35.5 meters (116 ft)
- Transmitter coordinates: 39°50′29″N 77°13′25″W

Links
- Public license information: Public file; LMS
- Webcast: Listen live Playlist
- Website: www.wzbt.org

WZBT (91.1 FM) is a radio station licensed to Gettysburg College, located in Gettysburg, Pennsylvania, United States. WZBT broadcasts as an independent, student-managed, non-commercial FM radio station, serving the greater Adams County, Pennsylvania community with music, news, and other programs as an FCC licensed broadcast entity since 1978. With an approximate broadcast radius of 35 miles from the center of Gettysburg, Pennsylvania, WZBT reaches a wide audience located in south central Pennsylvania and upper Maryland. Supervised by Gettysburg College administrators and faculty, and operated by the students of Gettysburg College, WZBT's purposes are to offer an effective means of responsible communication for students, faculty, staff, and community members, to be a source of information within and beyond the confines of the college, and to provide entertainment for its audience.

== History ==
Founded in 1948 as WWGC, the station was formed as a student-run media club on the Gettysburg College campus. The station was an on-campus only, closed-circuit radio system utilizing telephony transmission to dorm rooms and dining halls. Financed by the Student Chest and fully administered by students, WWGC's first studio was located on the third floor of Breidenbaugh Hall and broadcast was limited to three hours per evening, six days per week. During the fall of 1975, the Gettysburg College Board Of Trustees granted approval to WWGC-AM to transform from its closed-circuit AM frequency to a full service terrestrial radio FM station and received its first FCC license for educational FM broadcast in 1976. With initial funding from the Parents’ Committee that summer, WWGC was reborn as WZBT 90.3 FM on October 23, 1978. It began as a 10-watt educational FM collegiate radio station with an effective radius of 1 mile that covered the entire campus and downtown Gettysburg area.

In 1982, WZBT expanded to a Class A non-commercial radio broadcast entity and was reassigned to the 91.1 radio frequency. The station also increased its wattage from 10 to 128 watts, expanding its reach even further into the Gettysburg community.

In 1991, WZBT was displaced from its studio located in the College Union Building. The station remained off-the-air for close to a year until the President's Council allocated the funds for the station to build its new studio on the first floor of the Plank Gymnasium. WZBT was reborn in the spring of 1992 in its new facilities and was given approval to move its transmitter off-campus to the WGTY tower in Gettysburg, Pennsylvania. With another increase to 180 watts, the station was able to broadcast a total radius of twenty miles.

In 2008, WZBT optimized its terrestrial coverage, with a new 500 watt transmitter placed at 213 feet at the new WGTY tower with FCC license approval to cover the entirety of Adams County, - giving WZBT an ERP of 350 watts as a Class A FM broadcast entity. Additionally, in 2008, WZBT also acquired a new radio automation system, and for the first time in its 60-year history, the station was able to broadcast twenty-four hours a day, seven days a week.

== Programming ==
WZBT's programming consists of both live DJ shows and fully programmed automation that plays a wide variety of music – from indie rock, modern rock, jazz, blues, folk, electronica, and Americana. WZBT's live Internet stream allows individuals to listen to its programming without any geographic limits. It can be accessed via the station's streaming page or on the TuneIn streaming platform.

WZBT was formerly CMJ Radio 200, Loud Rock, and Jazz reporting station until July 2016. Currently, the station contributes it full airplay playlist to the Spinitron reporting and publishing service for the industry.
