= WSOX =

- Red Lion, Pennsylvania; United States
- Broadcast area: Harrisburg–Carlisle metropolitan area
- Frequency: 96.1 MHz (HD Radio)
- Branding: 96.1 SOX

Programming
- Language: English
- Format: Classic hits
- Subchannels: HD2: WSBA simulcast (talk); HD3: HOPE FM (Christian radio)

Ownership
- Owner: Cumulus Media; (Radio License Holding SRC, LLC)
- Sister stations: WARM-FM; WIOV-FM; WSBA

History
- First air date: 1959
- Former call signs: WGCB-FM (1959–1997); WTHM-FM (1997–1998)

Technical information
- Licensing authority: FCC
- Facility ID: 55351
- Class: B
- ERP: 13,500 watts (analog); 135 watts (digital)
- HAAT: 290 meters (950 ft)
- Transmitter coordinates: 39°54′16.4″N 76°34′46.9″W
- Translator: See § Translators

Links
- Public license information: Public file; LMS
- Webcast: Listen live; Listen live; Listen live (via iHeartRadio); Listen live (via Audacy); HD3: Listen live
- Website: www.961sox.com; HD3: hopefm.net

WSOX (96.1 MHz, 96-1 SOX) is a commercial radio station licensed to serve Red Lion, Pennsylvania. The station is owned by Cumulus Media through licensee Radio License Holding SRC, LLC and broadcasts a classic hits radio format. The station's service contour includes the metro areas of York, Harrisburg, Lebanon, Gettysburg and Lancaster, Pennsylvania, as well as the northern suburbs of Baltimore, Maryland. Its broadcast tower is located near Red Lion at (39°54′16.7″N 76°34′46.6″W).

WSOX uses HD Radio, and simulcasts the talk radio programming of sister station WSBA on its HD2 subchannel. The HOPE FM branded Christian radio programming is broadcast on the station's HD3 subchannel, which is simulcast on three FM translators.

== History ==
The Federal Communications Commission granted John M. Norris a construction permit for the station on July 22, 1959, with the WGCB-FM call sign. The station was granted its first license on August 1, 1960. WGCB-FM aired a Christian radio format.

The station's license was voluntarily assigned to Red Lion Broadcasting Company, Inc., effective May 23, 1963.

In 1969, Red Lion Broadcasting lost a landmark First Amendment case (Red Lion Broadcasting Co. v. FCC), after the station refused to grant free on-air time for a journalist to rebutt the claims made against him by an on-air evangelist.

In August 1997, the station's license was transferred from Thomas H. Moffit Sr. to Pioneer Broadcasting Corporation, followed by a call sign change to WTHM-FM on December 5, 1997. On July 1, 1998, the call sign was changed to WSOX. In March 2003, the license was transferred from Pioneer Broadcasting Corporation to Lancaster-York Broadcasting, LLC (owned by Brill Media) and four months later, in July 2003, the license was transferred from Lancaster-York Broadcasting, LLC to Susquehanna License, LLC, which was owned by Susquehanna Radio Corporation.

On October 31, 2005, Cumulus Media announced the creation of a new private partnership, Cumulus Media Partners, LLC, formed with Bain Capital, The Blackstone Group and Thomas H. Lee Partners, to purchase Susquehanna Radio Corporation for approximately $1.2 billion. The purchase was completed on May 5, 2006, at which time the license for WSOX was transferred to Radio License Holding SRC, LLC., a licensee of Cumulus Media Partners Susquehanna Corporation.

== Translators ==
The following three translators are licensed to Hope Christian Church of Marlton, Inc, and simulcast the programming of HOPE FM (owned by Calvary Chapel of Marlton) broadcast on WSOX-HD3:

Broadcast translators for WSOX-HD3
Call sign	Frequency	City of license	FID	ERP (W)	HAAT	Class	Transmitter coordinates	FCC info
W237DC	95.3 FM	New Holland, Pennsylvania	144115	250	260 m (853 ft)	D	40°04′45.4″N 76°00′43.8″W	LMS
W262CW	100.3 FM	Harrisburg, Pennsylvania	155485	250	170 m (558 ft)	D	40°11′30.3″N 76°52′0.9″W	LMS
W265DE	100.9 FM	Hershey, Pennsylvania	144130	120	194 m (636 ft)	D	40°15′2.3″N 76°39′43.9″W	LMS

== Signal note ==
WSOX is short-spaced to three other stations: WHUR-FM 96.3 WHUR (licensed to serve Washington, D.C.), WCTO Cat Country 96 & 107 (licensed to serve Easton, Pennsylvania), and WWIN-FM Magic 95.9 (licensed to serve Glen Burnie, Maryland).

WSOX and WCTO operate on the same channel and the distance between the stations' transmitters is 78 miles as determined by FCC rules. The minimum distance between two Class B stations operating on the same channel according to current FCC rules is 150 miles.

WSOX and WHUR-FM operate on first adjacent channels (96.1 & 96.3) and the distance between the stations' transmitters is 71 miles as determined by FCC rules. The minimum distance between two Class B stations operating on first adjacent channels according to current FCC rules is 105 miles.

WSOX and WWIN-FM also operate on first adjacent channels (95.9 & 96.1) and the distance between the stations' transmitters is 48 miles as determined by FCC rules. The minimum distance between a Class B station (WSOX) and a Class A station (WWIN-FM) operating on first adjacent channels according to current FCC rules is 70 miles.

WSOX uses a directional antenna to reduce its signal toward the south-southwest, in the direction of WHUR-FM and WWIN-FM.
