= WHVR =

Radio station in Hanover, Pennsylvania

- Hanover, Pennsylvania; United States
- Broadcast area: South Central Pennsylvania; Central Maryland
- Frequency: 1280 kHz
- Branding: Happy 95-3 and 1280

Programming
- Language: English
- Format: Adult contemporary
- Affiliations: Baltimore Orioles; Westwood One

Ownership
- Owner: Forever Media (sale to On First Media LLC pending); (FM Radio Licenses, LLC)
- Sister stations: WGTY; WYCR

History
- First air date: January 7, 1949
- Call sign meaning: Hanover

Technical information
- Licensing authority: FCC
- Facility ID: 54607
- Class: B
- Power: 5,000 watts (day); 500 watts (night)
- Transmitter coordinates: 39°49′11.4″N 77°0′23.9″W
- Translator: 95.3 W237EN (Hanover)

Links
- Public license information: Public file; LMS
- Webcast: Listen live
- Website: www.foreveryork.com/happy-95-3/

WHVR (1280 kHz) is a commercial AM radio station in Hanover, Pennsylvania, United States, serving the York radio market. The station is owned by Forever Media, through licensee FM Radio Licenses, LLC and broadcasts an adult contemporary format, known as "Happy 95-3 and 1280". WHVR also carries Baltimore Orioles baseball games.

By day, WHVR is powered at 5,000 watts. To protect other stations on 1280 AM from interference, WHVR reduces power at night to 500 watts. It uses a directional antenna at all times. Programming is also heard on FM translator W237EN at 95.3 MHz in Hanover. The translator has an effective radiated power (ERP) of 250 watts.

== History ==
On January 7, 1949, WHVR first signed on the air. It was a daytimer with a power of 1,000 watts. Its radio studios were in the Hanover Trust building. John D. Bair was the president and Production Manager. Initially the station was on the air from 6:30 am until local sunset.

WHVR was a pioneer in remote pickup with a 26.35 MHz unit that would allow broadcasting back to the station events where a phone line was not available.

On August 1, 2005, WHVR changed their format to classic country, branded as "Real Country 1280 WHVR".

On March 20, 2017, WHVR changed formats from classic country to classic hits, and switched branding from "Real Country 1280 WHVR" to "Classic Hits 1280 and 95.3 WHVR".

On May 21, 2019, WHVR, along with WGET in Gettysburg, began simulcasting an adult contemporary format, along with the new launch of W229DK, 93.7 FM which rebroadcasts WGET. Collectively, the AM stations and FM translators are known as Happy 1280, 1320 AM & 95.3, 93.7 FM.

On January 1, 2022, the stations shifted their format to contemporary hit radio. With this change, they ended their simulcast and were branded as "Nu 95.3" and "Nu 93.7", respectively, though both stations featured identical playlists supplied by Westwood One. The "Nu" branding was shared with WNUU (92.7) in nearby Starview.

On November 1, 2022, WHVR and WGET dropped their Top 40/CHR format and began stunting with Christmas music, branded as "Santa 95.3", with a new format to launch in January 2023. On January 1, 2023, the stations returned to an adult contemporary format and the "Happy" branding. WNUU concurrently made identical format changes and became WPPY. The stations again began playing Christmas music under the "Santa" name on November 1.

== Previous logo ==
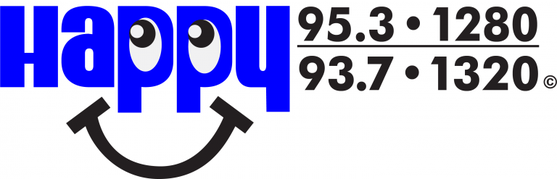
