= WGTY =

Radio station in Gettysburg, Pennsylvania

Coordinates: 39.856°N 76.949°W

- Gettysburg, Pennsylvania; United States
- Broadcast area: Gettysburg metropolitan area
- Frequency: 107.7 MHz
- RDS: PI: 6686; PS: Froggy 107.7 Title Artist; RT: Title by Artist
- Branding: Froggy 107-7

Programming
- Language: English
- Format: Country music

Ownership
- Owner: Forever Media (sale to On First Media LLC pending); (FM Radio Licenses, LLC)
- Sister stations: WHVR; WYCR

History
- First air date: July 5, 1962
- Former call signs: WGET-FM (1962–1982)
- Call sign meaning: Gettysburg

Technical information
- Licensing authority: FCC
- Facility ID: 67131
- Class: B
- ERP: 16,000 watts horizontal; 15,500 watts vertical
- HAAT: 259 meters (850 ft)

Links
- Public license information: Public file; LMS
- Webcast: Listen live
- Website: www.foreveryork.com/froggy-107-7/

WGTY (107.7 MHz, Froggy 107-7) is a country music formatted commercial radio station. Owned by Forever Media, through licensee FM Radio Licenses, LLC, it is licensed to Gettysburg, Pennsylvania, serving Adams County and York County in Pennsylvania. It was formerly called "Great Country 107.7".

== History ==
WGET-FM was an automated beautiful music station for many years, a forgotten companion to the full-service WGET (1320 AM). The call sign was changed to WGTY in 1982. In early 1984, Rick McCauslin, then a sales rep for WGET/WGTY was promoted to general manager, replacing the long-time GM, Richard Selby. Rick planned to investigate the possibility of changing WGTY to a live country station, as the York–Adams County area only had one country station serving it, Z-107, broadcasting out of the Harrisburg area. Rick hired Wally Daniels as the program director for both stations, tasking him with building the country station.

The station signed off at midnight in those days. Dave Cannon was the music director and helped to establish WGTY's country library. On November 11, 1984, at 6 a.m., WGTY officially began its new life as "Country FM 108".

WGTY was sold to Forever Media's FM Radio Licenses, LLC effective December 1, 2015, at a purchase price of $4.25 million, and on January 4, 2016, the station's branding was changed to "Froggy 107-7".

On October 15, 2026, it was announced that Forever Media would sell its York cluster, including WGTY, to York Revolution's On First Media LLC for $3.1 million.
