= WLBR =

Radio station in Lebanon, Pennsylvania

- Lebanon, Pennsylvania; United States
- Frequency: 1270 kHz
- Branding: 99.7 WiLBuR Radio

Programming
- Format: Full-service radio–classic hits
- Affiliations: NBC News Radio; Compass Media Networks

Ownership
- Owner: Seven Mountains Media; (Southern Belle Media Family, LLC)
- Sister stations: WFVY

History
- First air date: 1946
- Call sign meaning: Lebanon Broadcasting (former owner)

Technical information
- Licensing authority: FCC
- Facility ID: 36874
- Class: B
- Power: 5,000 watts (day); 1,000 watts (night)
- Transmitter coordinates: 40°21′35.33″N 76°27′28.87″W
- Translator: 99.7 W259DM (Lebanon)

Links
- Public license information: Public file; LMS
- Webcast: Listen Live
- Website: wilburradio.com

WLBR (1270 AM, "WiLBuR 99.7") is a radio station with a classic hits format in Lebanon, Pennsylvania, United States, the station is currently owned by Seven Mountains Media, through licensee Southern Belle Media Family, LLC, and features programming from NBC News Radio and Compass Media Networks. Prior to the sale of WLBR and WQIC (now WFVY), both stations were owned by the Lebanon Broadcasting Company.

== History ==
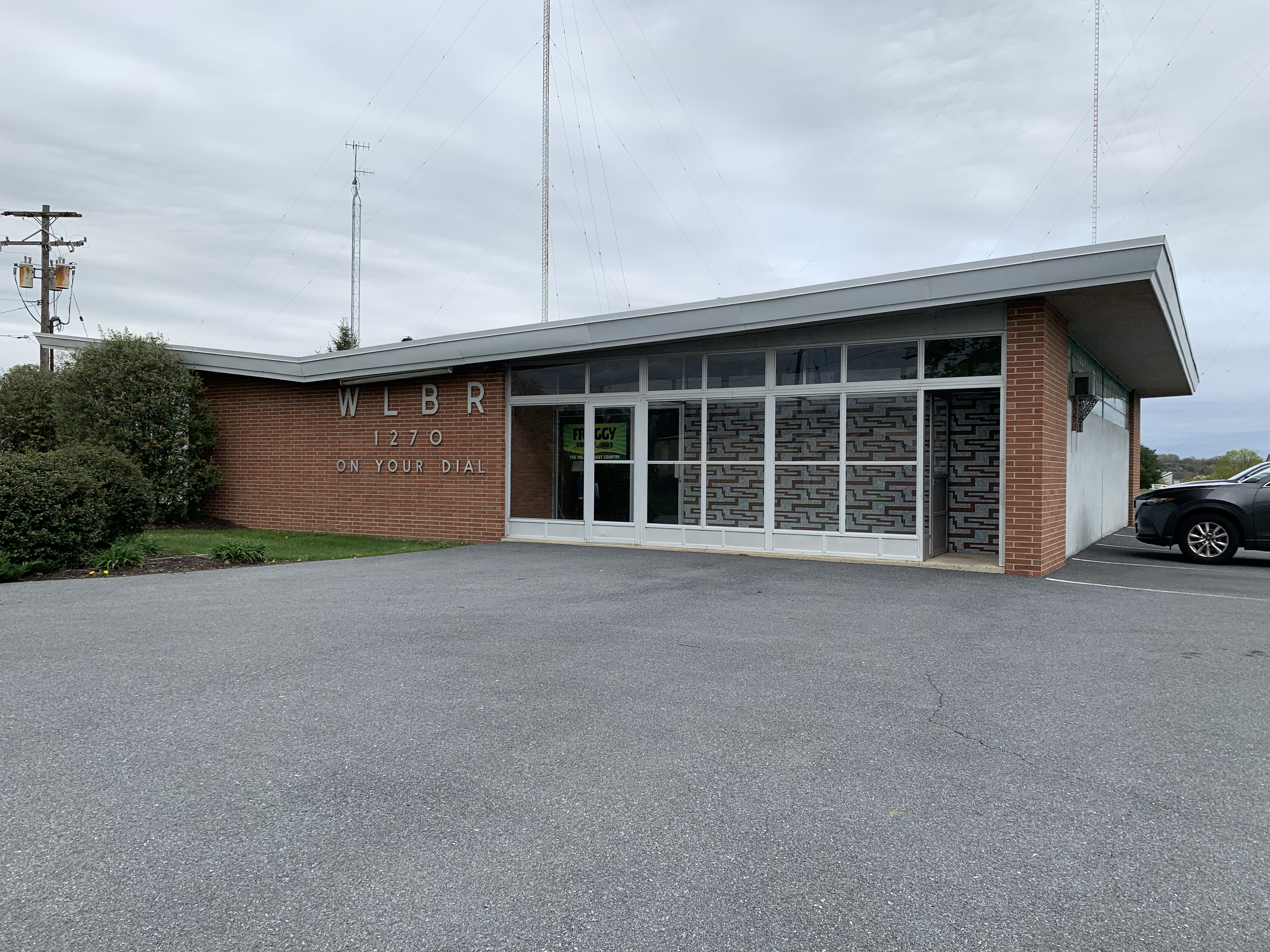
WLBR studio in Lebanon, PA

WLBR's studio shares the same building with sister station, 100.1 WFVY, along Pennsylvania Route 72 in Ebenezer, two miles northwest of Lebanon. The building has been the home of the station since the 1950s. WLBR's transmitter and four towers stand behind the studios.

After more than 70 years of family ownership, Lebanon Broadcasting president Robert Etter announced on August 23, 2019, that he was selling WLBR and WQIC to Hollidaysburg-based Forever Media for $1.225 million. The transaction was finalized on December 31, 2019.

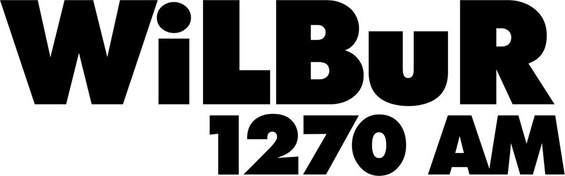
"WiLBuR 1270" logo

On April 28, 2020, the station flipped to classic hits as WiLBuR 1270.

The station was affiliated with ABC News Radio for many decades until April 2020 when the station switched to Westwood One News. After Westwood One News ceased operations on August 30, 2020, WLBR began carrying NBC News Radio.

In late November 2021, WLBR switched to a 24/7 Christmas music format, replacing WROZ in Lancaster as an official Christmas station in Central Pennsylvania and the entire Lebanon Valley. The station returned to its classic hits format on December 27 at midnight.

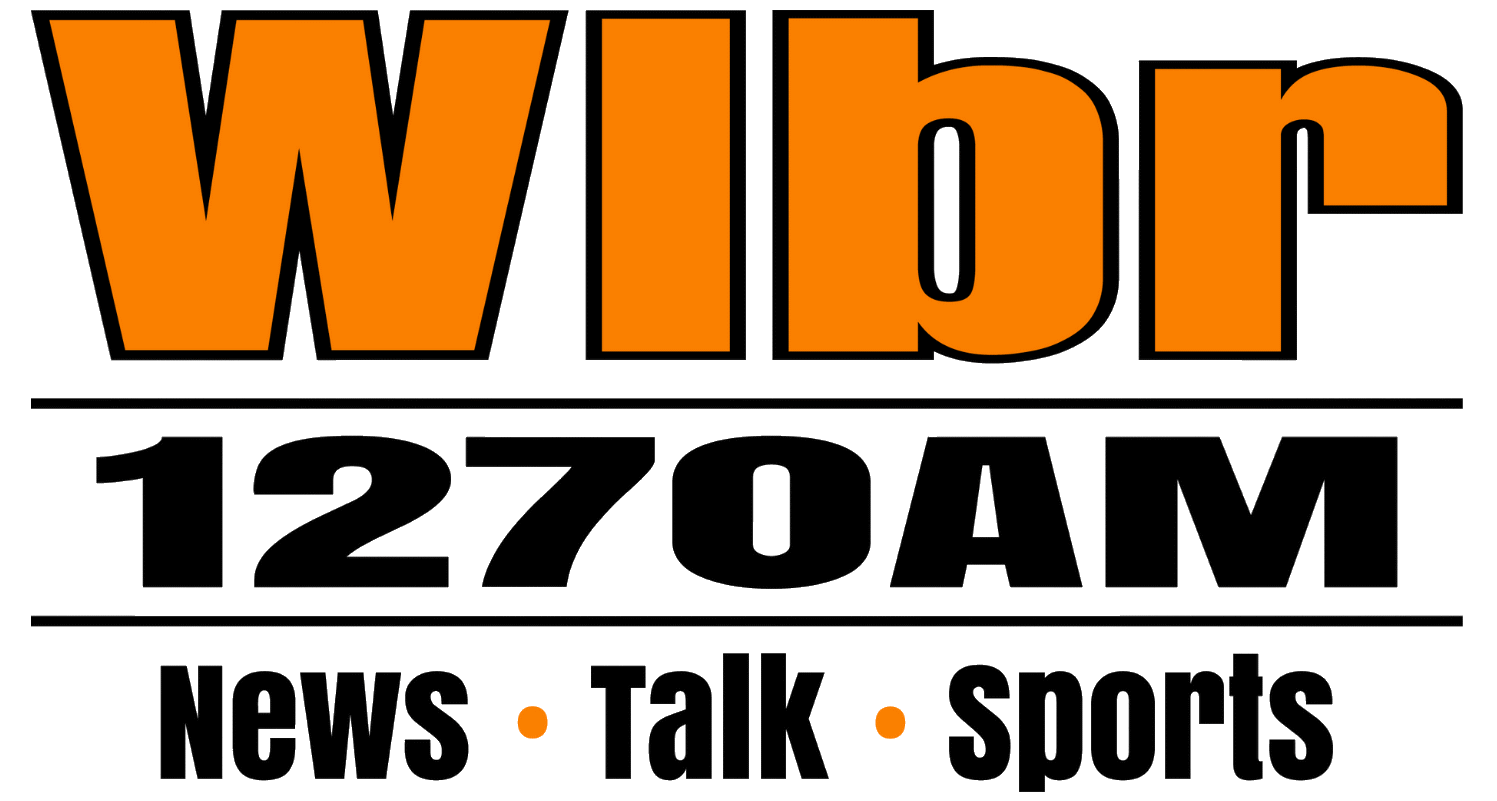
Logo as a conservative talk station

WLBR flipped from classic hits to conservative talk on March 15, 2022.

It was announced on October 12, 2022, that Forever Media planned to sell 34 stations, including WLBR and WFVY, to State College-based Seven Mountains Media for $17.375 million. The deal closed on January 1, 2023.

On November 30, 2023, after a one-year hiatus, WLBR again began playing a 24/7 Christmas music format, with local and national news continuing to air on the station. WLBR also switched from NBC News Radio to CBS News Radio, marking the third affiliation switch for the station since 2020. On January 1, 2024, WLBR began stunting with a "wheel of formats", changing hourly with the temporary formats including adult contemporary (previously used by its FM sister station, WFVY) as "Easy 1270", disco as "Disco 1270", oldies as "Hippie 1270", all-Elvis Presley as "1270 The King", and alternative rock as "1270 The Alternative". On January 3, 2024, the station returned to a classic hits format, while in the process, launching an FM simulcast on 99.7 under the WiLBuR 99.7 branding. In May of 2026, following the demise of CBS News Radio, the station switched back to NBC News Radio.

The station was also one of the longest-tenured affiliates of the Philadelphia Phillies Radio Network. In 2024, the station opted not to renew its radio affiliation with the Phillies, citing a rate increase by the team.

== Translator ==
Call sign	Frequency	City of license	FID	ERP (W)	Class	Transmitter coordinates	FCC info
W259DM	99.7 FM	Lebanon, Pennsylvania	143437	180	D	40°21′35.33″N 76°27′28.87″W	LMS
