= Harrisburg–York–Lebanon combined statistical area =

Harrisburg–York–Lebanon, PA CSA South Central Pennsylvania
- Combined Statistical Area
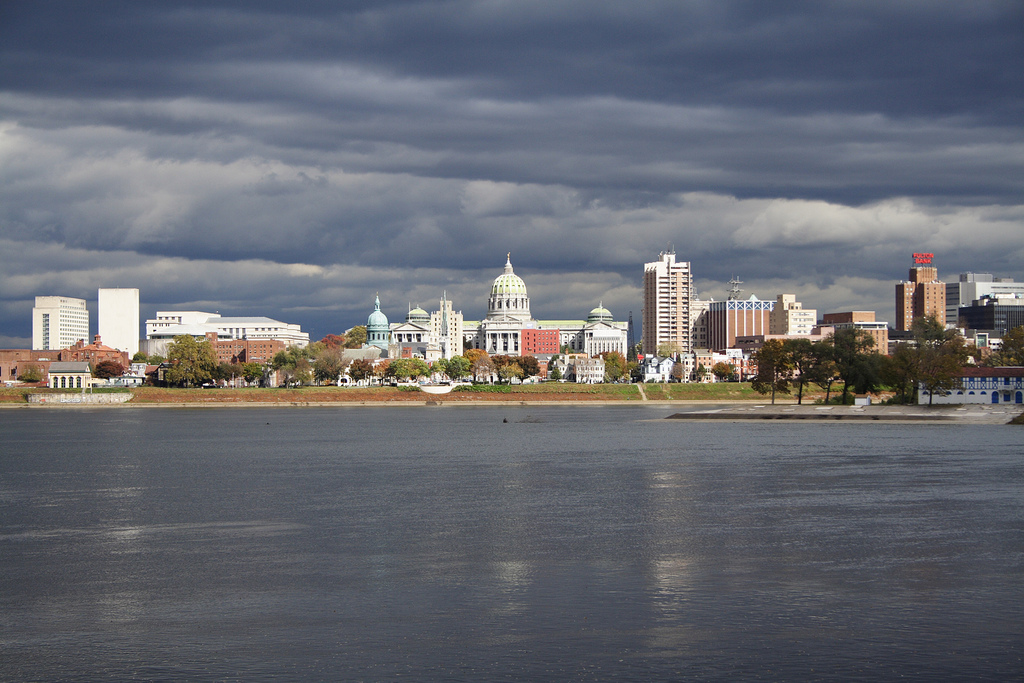
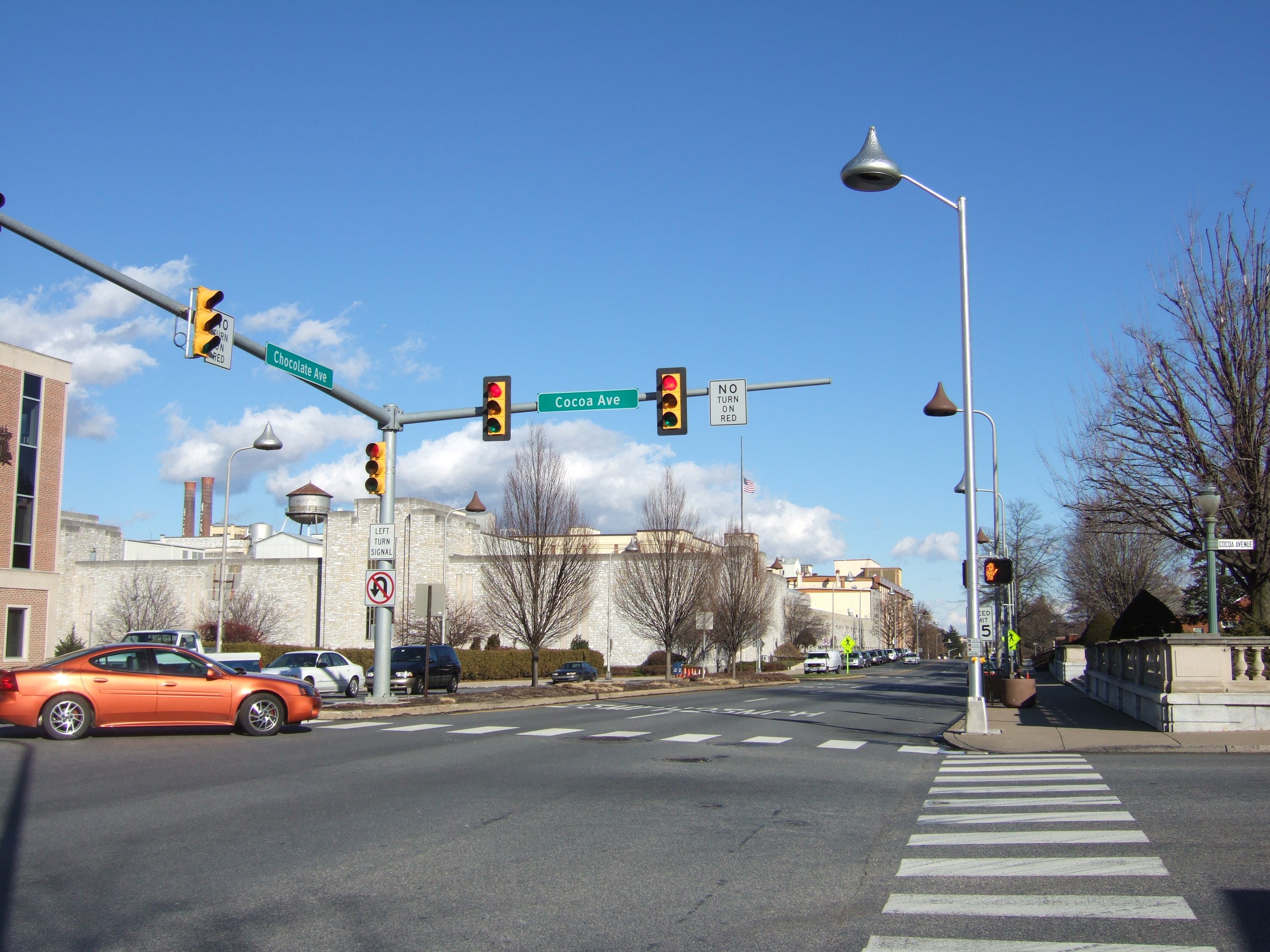
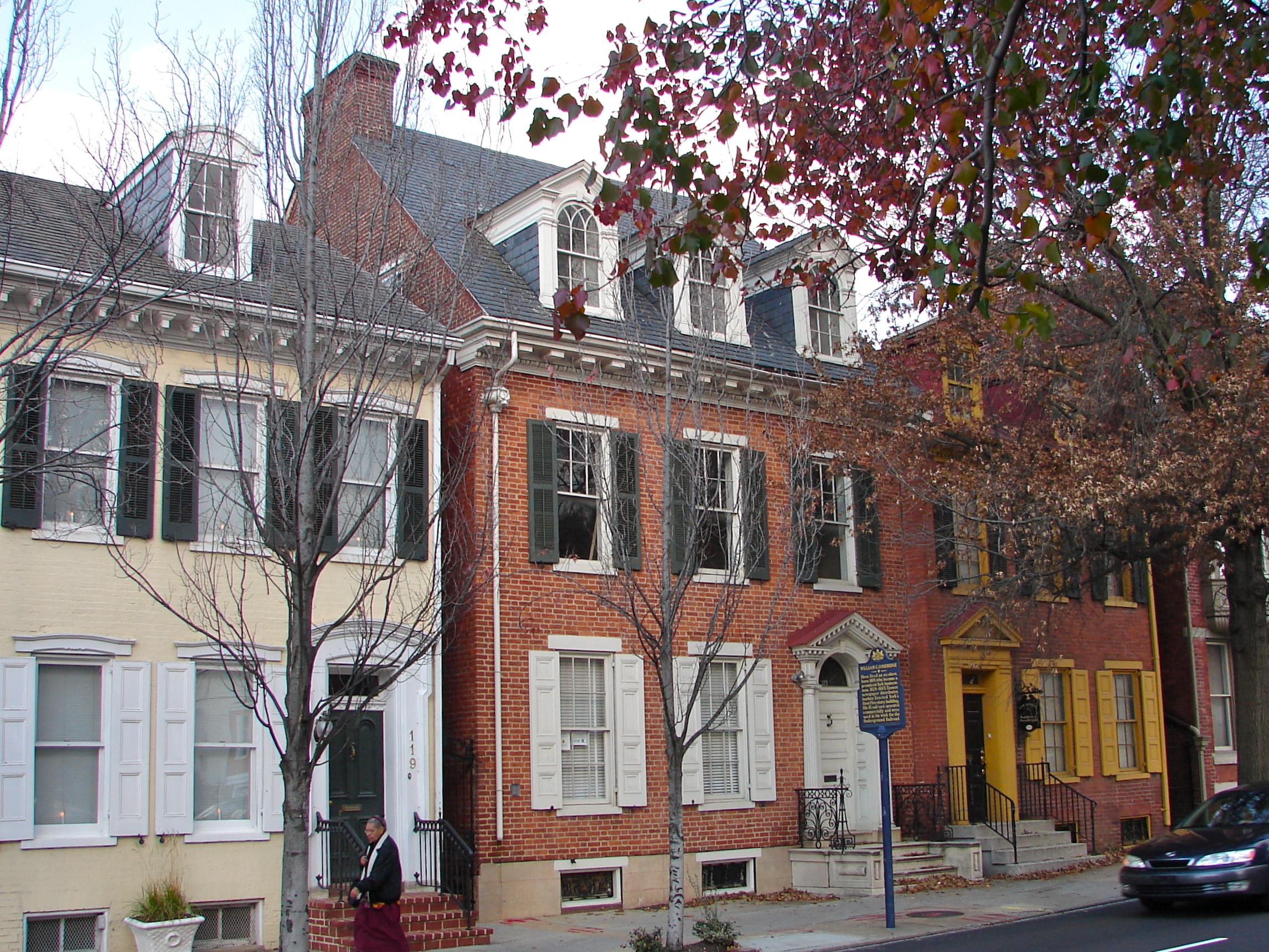
Interactive Map of Harrisburg–York–Lebanon
Combined Statistical Area
Harrisburg–Carlisle, PA MSA
Lebanon, PA MSA
Gettysburg, PA MSA
York–Hanover, PA MSA
- Country: United States
- State: Pennsylvania
- Principal cities: Harrisburg; York; Lebanon; Carlisle; Hanover; Gettysburg

Area
  - Total: 3,459.1 sq mi (8,959 km^{2})

Population (2010 est.)
  - Total: 1,219,422
  - Density: 352.5/sq mi (136.1/km^{2})
- Time zone: UTC-5 (ET)
  - Summer (DST): UTC-4 (EDT)

The Harrisburg–York–Lebanon, PA combined statistical area (CSA) is a region assigned by the U.S. Office of Management and Budget that includes six cities in the Harrisburg and York areas along with several metropolitan statistical areas of Pennsylvania that combine to form a combined statistical area. As of the 2010 United States census, the CSA had a population total of 1,219,422, and ranked the third most populous CSA in Pennsylvania and 43rd most populous in the nation.

== Components of the combined statistical area ==
- Harrisburg–Carlisle, PA metropolitan statistical area
  - Cumberland County population 235,406
  - Dauphin County population 268,100
  - Perry County population 45,969
- Lebanon, PA metropolitan statistical area
  - Lebanon County population 133,568
- Gettysburg, PA metropolitan statistical area
  - Adams County population 101,407
- York–Hanover, PA metropolitan statistical area
  - York County population 434,972

== Demographics ==
As of 2000 census, there were 629,401 people, 248,931 households, and 167,328 families residing in the CSA. The racial makeup of the CSA was 87.78% White, 7.84% African American, 0.14% Native American, 1.53% Asian, 0.03% Pacific Islander, 1.38% from other races, and 1.29% from two or more races. Hispanic or Latino people of any race were 3.11% of the population.

The median income for a household in the CSA was $42,740, and the median income for a family was $51,071. Males had a median income of $35,660 versus $26,116 for females. The per capita income for the CSA was $21,017.

== See also ==
- Combined statistical area
- Metropolitan statistical area
- Pennsylvania metropolitan areas
