= WIOV-FM =

Radio station in Ephrata, Pennsylvania

- Ephrata, Pennsylvania; United States
- Broadcast area: South Central Pennsylvania
- Frequency: 105.1 MHz (HD Radio)
- Branding: I 105

Programming
- Format: Country
- Affiliations: Westwood One

Ownership
- Owner: Cumulus Media; (Radio License Holding CBC, LLC)
- Sister stations: WARM-FM, WSBA, WSOX

History
- First air date: November 9, 1962 (as WGSA-FM)
- Former call signs: WGSA-FM (1961–1969)
- Call sign meaning: Western and Roman numerals for "105"

Technical information
- Licensing authority: FCC
- Facility ID: 55308
- Class: B
- ERP: 25,000 watts
- HAAT: 214 meters (702 ft)
- Transmitter coordinates: 40°10′30.3″N 76°9′29.8″W

Links
- Public license information: Public file; LMS
- Webcast: Listen live
- Website: www.wiov.com

WIOV-FM (105.1 MHz, "The Big I 105") is a commercial radio station licensed to serve Ephrata, Pennsylvania. The station is owned by Radio License Holding CBC LLC, a part of Cumulus Media, and broadcasts a country music radio format. The station's studios and offices are located on South Reading Road, along PA 272, at Rothsville Road in Ephrata. The station's broadcast tower is located off Tower Road near Ephrata at (40°10′30.2″N 76°9′29.5″W).

WIOV-FM has local DJs in the daytime with syndicated shows at night from Whitney Allen (evenings) and Blair Garner (overnight).

== History ==
The Federal Communications Commission granted Garden Spot Broadcasters, Inc. a construction permit for the station on April 24, 1962, with the WGSA-FM call sign. On November 9, 1962, the station signed on for the first time. It was the FM counterpart to AM 1360 WGSA (now off the air). WGSA-AM-FM were both owned by Garden Spot Broadcasters with the two stations simulcasting part of their day. At the time, WGSA-FM was licensed for only 1,580 watts, a fraction of its current effective radiated power (ERP). The station was granted its first license by the FCC on January 23, 1963.

On April 4, 1970, Garden Spot Broadcasters was granted a construction permit by the FCC to increase the station's ERP to 50,000 watts while its height above average terrain (HAAT) remained at 500 feet, followed by a new license with the upgraded facilities on October 19, 1970. By 1970, the FM station was running an automated country music format, with the new call sign WIOV, using a mix of western and Roman numerals to represent the dial position at 105 MHz. Over time, disc jockeys were added and the automation was scaled back.

In 1984, the FM station was acquired by Brill Media. Brill moved the studios to 44 Bethany Road.

On April 14, 1999, the FCC granted a construction permit to increase the station's HAAT to 214 meters (702 ft) while decreasing the station's ERP to 25,000 watts.

In 2004, Citadel Broadcasting acquired WIOV-FM. In 2011, the United States Department of Justice approved the purchase of Citadel Broadcasting by Cumulus Media. The sale was completed September 18, 2011.

Longtime morning host Jerry Murphy was found dead in his home on February 14, 2018, when he failed to show up for work. Murphy (born Gerald Gebhard) had been the wake up voice on WIOV-FM since 1999. He was 61. Casey Allen, his co-host, is now paired with Program Director Rich Creeger for morning drive time.

On March 2, 2018, Cumulus Media announced that two stations in its Harrisburg cluster, country formatted 106.7 WZCY-FM, would trade places with Top 40/CHR formatted 93.5 WWKL effective March 15. WIOV and WZCY had service contours that overlapped in much of South Central Pennsylvania. The move to the lower-powered Class A station on 93.5 MHz would allow WZCY to continue focusing on covering the Harrisburg market, while WWKL, at 106.7 MHz, would get a Class B signal having a larger service contour, covering Lancaster, York and Lebanon in addition to Harrisburg. In December 2021, WIOV became the sole Cumulus country station in South Central Pennsylvania, as WZCY switched its format to classic rock.

== Signal note ==
WIOV-FM is short spaced to three other Class B stations: WDAS-FM 105.3 WDAS-FM (licensed to serve Philadelphia, Pennsylvania), WWPR-FM Power 105.1 (licensed to serve New York City) and WAVA-FM 105.1 WAVA (licensed to serve Arlington, Virginia).

WIOV-FM and WDAS-FM operate on first adjacent channels (105.1 MHz and 105.3 MHz) and the distance between the stations' transmitters is 49 miles as determined by FCC rules. The minimum distance between two Class B stations operating on first adjacent channels according to current FCC rules is 105 miles.

WIOV-FM and WWPR-FM operate on the same channel and the distance between the stations' transmitters is 121 miles as determined by FCC rules. WAVA-FM also operates on the same channel as WIOV-FM and the distance between the stations' transmitters is 103 miles as determined by FCC rules. The minimum distance between two Class B stations operating on the same channel according to current FCC rules is 150 miles.
