= Pennsylvania metropolitan areas =

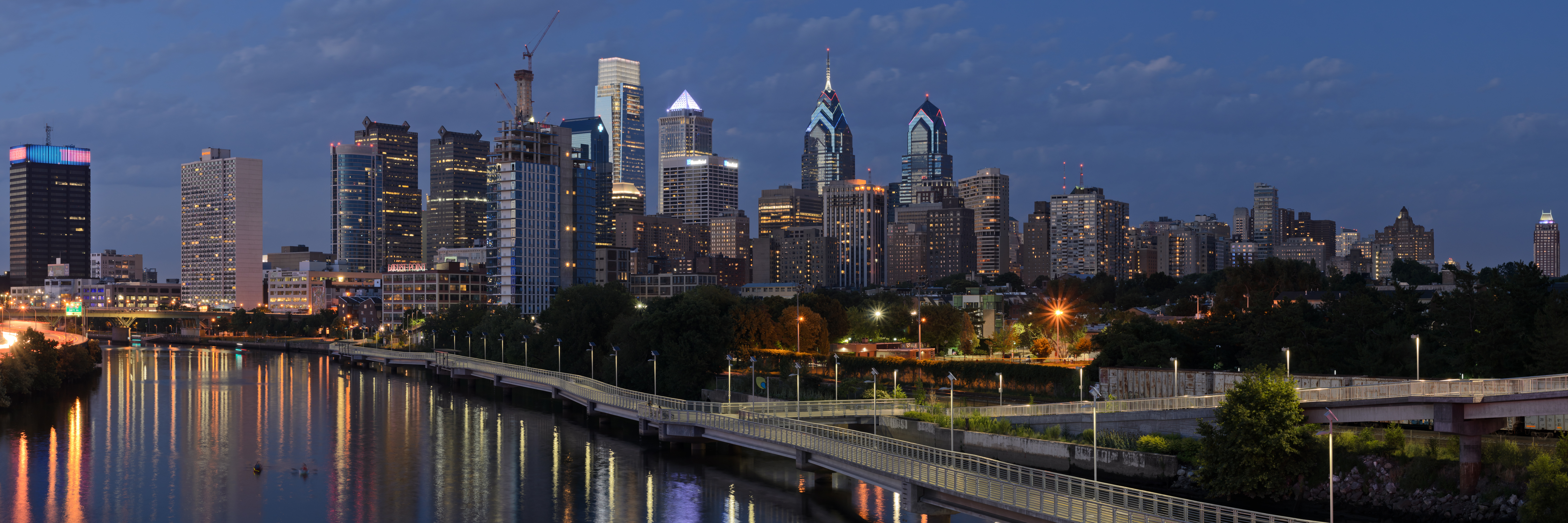
Philadelphia, the largest city in Pennsylvania and sixth-largest city in the nation, with a population of 1,603,797, and the center of the Philadelphia-Camden-Wilmington, PA-NJ-DE-MD metropolitan area, the state's largest metropolitan statistical area and nation's seventh-largest with a population of 6,245,051

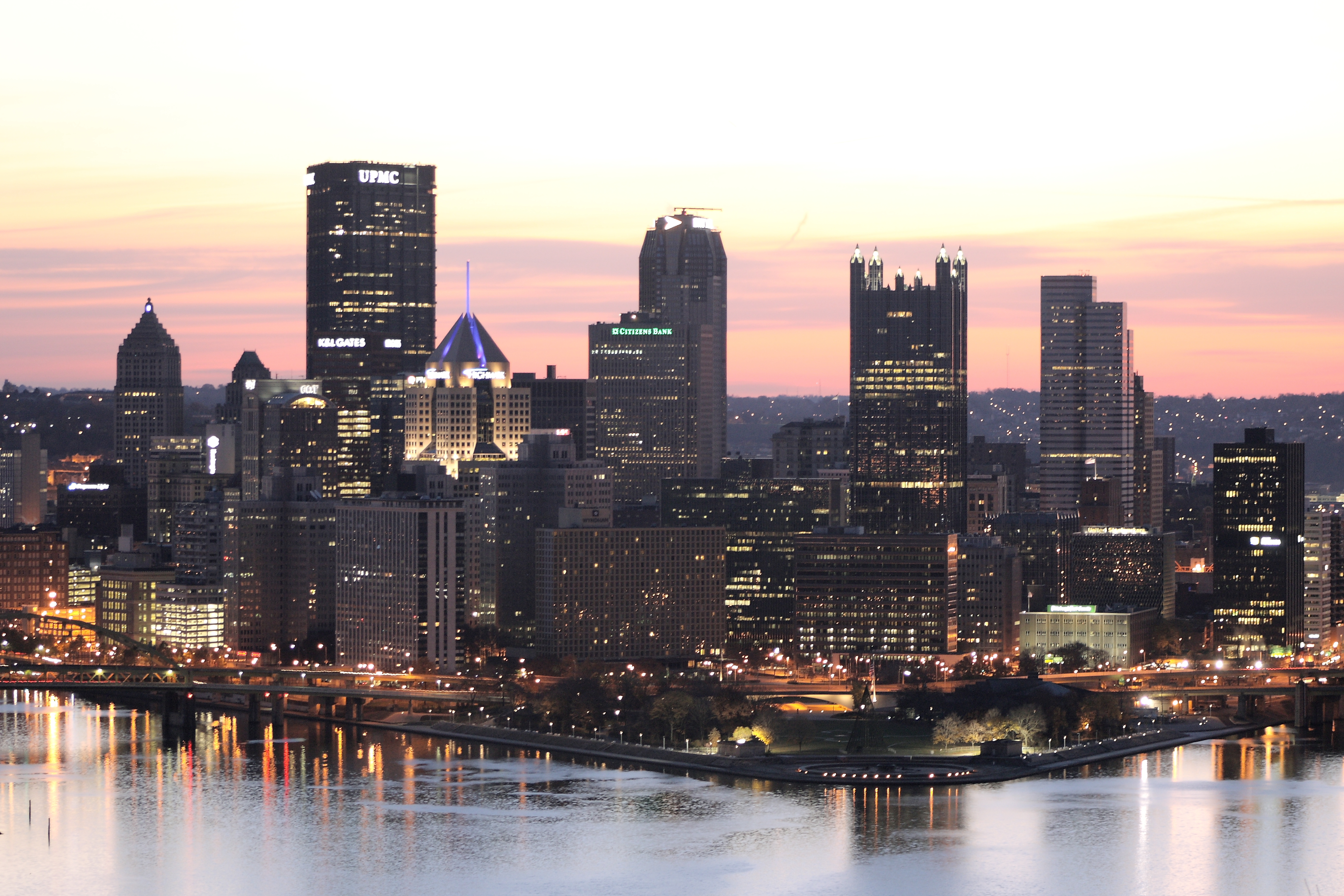
Pittsburgh, the second-largest city in Pennsylvania, and the center of Greater Pittsburgh, the state's second-largest metropolitan area

Pennsylvania has 14 U.S. Census Bureau-designated metropolitan statistical areas (MSAs) and four combined statistical areas (CSAs). As of 2020, Philadelphia, the seventh-largest United States metropolitan area, is the state's largest metropolitan area followed by Pittsburgh and Allentown.

== Metropolitan statistical areas (MSAs) ==
The following sortable table lists the 18 MSAs of the Commonwealth of Pennsylvania, including:

1. The MSA rank by population as of July 1, 2020, as estimated by the United States Census Bureau
2. The MSA name as designated by the United States Office of Management and Budget
3. The MSA population as of April 1, 2020, as enumerated by the 2020 United States census
4. The MSA population as of April 1, 2010, as enumerated by the 2010 United States census
5. The percent MSA population change from April 1, 2010, to July 1, 2020
6. The combined statistical area (CSA) if the MSA is a component

The 18 "metropolitan statistical areas" of Pennsylvania
Rank	Metropolitan statistical area	2020 Census	2010 Census	% Change	Encompassing combined statistical area
1	Philadelphia-Camden-Wilmington, PA-NJ-DE-MD MSA	6,245,051	5,965,343	+4.69%	Philadelphia-Reading-Camden, PA-NJ-DE-MD CSA
2	Pittsburgh, PA MSA	2,370,930	2,356,285	+0.62%	Pittsburgh-New Castle-Weirton, PA-OH-WV CSA
3	Allentown-Bethlehem-Easton, PA-NJ MSA	861,889	821,173	+4.96%	
4	Harrisburg-Carlisle, PA MSA	591,712	549,475	+7.69%	Harrisburg-York-Lebanon, PA CSA
5	Scranton–Wilkes-Barre, PA MSA	567,559	563,631	+0.70%	
6	Lancaster, PA MSA	552,984	519,445	+6.46%	
7	York-Hanover, PA MSA	456,438	434,972	+4.94%	Harrisburg-York-Lebanon, PA CSA
8	Reading, PA MSA	428,849	411,442	+4.23%	Philadelphia-Reading-Camden, PA-NJ-DE-MD CSA
9	Erie, PA MSA	270,876	280,566	−3.45%	Erie-Meadville, PA CSA
10	East Stroudsburg, PA MSA	168,327	169,842	−0.89%	New York-Newark, NY-NJ-CT-PA CSA
11	State College, PA MSA	158,172	153,990	+2.72%	State College-DuBois, PA CSA
12	Chambersburg-Waynesboro, PA MSA	155,932	149,618	+4.22%	Washington-Baltimore-Arlington, DC-MD-VA-WV-PA CSA
13	Lebanon, PA MSA	143,257	133,568	+7.25%	Harrisburg-York-Lebanon, PA CSA
14	Johnstown, PA MSA	133,472	143,679	−7.10%	Johnstown-Somerset, PA CSA
15	Altoona, PA MSA	122,822	127,089	−3.36%	
16	Williamsport, PA MSA	114,188	116,111	−1.66%	Williamsport-Lock Haven, PA CSA
17	Gettysburg, PA MSA	103,852	101,407	+2.41%	Harrisburg-York-Lebanon, PA CSA
18	Bloomsburg-Berwick MSA	82,863	85,562	−3.15%	Bloomsburg-Berwick-Sunbury, PA CSA

== Combined statistical areas (CSAs) ==
The following sortable table lists the combined statistical areas (CSAs) of the Commonwealth of Pennsylvania with the following information:

1. CSA rank by population as of July 1, 2020, as estimated by the United States Census Bureau
2. The CSA name as designated by the United States Office of Management and Budget
3. The CSA population as of July 1, 2020, as estimated by the United States Census Bureau
4. CSA population as of April 1, 2010, as enumerated by the 2010 United States census
5. Percent CSA population change from April 1, 2010, to July 1, 2020
6. Core Based Statistical Areas (CBSAs) that constitute the CSA

(Metropolitan Statistical Areas that are not combined with other MSAs or CBSAs are not also listed below.)

Combined Statistical Areas (CSAs) of the Commonwealth of Pennsylvania
Rank	Combined Statistical Area	2020 Census	2010 Census	Change	Constituent Core Based Statistical Areas
1	New York-Newark, NY-NJ-CT-PA CSA	23,582,649	22,255,491	+5.96%	New York-Newark-Jersey City, NY-NJ-PA MSA; Bridgeport-Stamford-Norwalk, CT MSA; New Haven-Milford, CT MSA; Trenton-Princeton, NJ MSA; Torrington, CT μSA; Kingston, NY MSA
2	Washington-Baltimore-Arlington, DC-MD-VA-WV-PA CSA	9,973,383	9,050,192	+10.20%	Washington-Arlington-Alexandria, DC-VA-MD-WV MSA; Baltimore-Columbia-Towson, MD MSA; Hagerstown-Martinsburg, MD-WV MSA; Chambersburg-Waynesboro, PA MSA; Winchester, VA-WV MSA; California-Lexington Park, MD MSA; Easton, MD μSA; Cambridge, MD μSA
3	Philadelphia-Reading-Camden, PA-NJ-DE-MD CSA	7,379,700	7,067,807	+4.41%	Philadelphia-Camden-Wilmington, PA-NJ-DE-MD MSA; Reading, PA MSA; Atlantic City-Hammonton, NJ MSA; Dover, DE MSA; Vineland-Bridgeton, NJ MSA; Ocean City, NJ MSA
4	Pittsburgh-New Castle-Weirton, PA-OH-WV CSA	2,657,149	2,660,727	−0.13%	Pittsburgh, PA MSA; Weirton-Steubenville, WV-OH MSA; New Castle, PA μSA; Indiana, PA μSA
5	Harrisburg-York-Lebanon, PA CSA	1,295,259	1,219,422	+6.22%	Harrisburg–Carlisle metropolitan statistical area York-Hanover, PA MSA; Lebanon, PA MSA; Gettysburg, PA MSA
6	Allentown-Bethlehem-East Stroudsburg, PA-NJ CSA	1,030,216	991,015	+3.96%	Allentown-Bethlehem-Easton, PA-NJ MSA; East Stroudsburg, PA MSA
7	Youngstown-Warren-East Liverpool, OH-PA CSA	643,120	673,614	−4.53%	Youngstown-Warren-Boardman, OH-PA MSA; Salem, OH μSA
7	Erie-Meadville, PA CSA	354,814	369,331	−3.93%	Erie, PA MSA; Meadville, PA μSA
8	Bloomsburg-Berwick-Sunbury, PA CSA	256,927	264,739	−2.95%	Sunbury, PA μSA; Bloomsburg-Berwick, PA MSA; Lewisburg, PA μSA; Selinsgrove, PA μSA
9	State College-DuBois, PA CSA	238,734	235,632	+1.32%	State College, PA MSA; DuBois, PA μSA
10	Johnstown-Somerset, PA CSA	207,601	221,421	−6.24%	Johnstown, PA MSA; Somerset, PA μSA
11	Altoona-Huntingdon, PA CSA	166,914	173,002	−3.52%	Altoona, PA MSA; Huntingdon, PA μSA
12	Williamsport-Lock Haven, PA CSA	151,638	155,349	−2.39%	Williamsport, PA MSA; Lock Haven, PA μSA

== See also ==
- List of cities in Pennsylvania
- List of metropolitan statistical areas
- List of municipalities in Pennsylvania
