= WHYF =

Radio station in Shiremanstown, Pennsylvania

Coordinates: 40°11′28″N 76°57′09″W

- Shiremanstown, Pennsylvania; United States
- Broadcast area: Harrisburg metropolitan area
- Frequency: 720 kHz
- Branding: Holy Family Radio

Programming
- Format: Catholic talk and teaching
- Affiliations: EWTN Radio

Ownership
- Owner: Holy Family Radio, Inc

History
- First air date: June 1987
- Former call signs: WWII (1987–2011)
- Call sign meaning: Holy Family

Technical information
- Licensing authority: FCC
- Class: D
- Power: 2,200 watts (days only)

Links
- Public license information: Public file; LMS
- Webcast: Listen live
- Website: www.720whyf.com

WHYF (720 AM) is a noncommercial radio station licensed to Shiremanstown, Pennsylvania, United States, and serving the Harrisburg metropolitan area, operating during the daytime hours only. It broadcasts a Catholic radio format, mostly from EWTN Radio with some local programs. It is owned by Holy Family Radio, Inc.

== History ==
In June 1987, the station signed on the air. It used the call sign WWII and had a contemporary Christian music format in AM stereo.

In July 2011, the station was sold to a group of Catholic broadcasters in the Diocese of Harrisburg, using the name Holy Family Radio, Inc. The call sign switched to WHYF on August 2, 2011.
