= WSBA (AM) =

- York, Pennsylvania; United States
- Frequency: 910 kHz
- Branding: NewsTalk 93.9 & 910 WSBA

Programming
- Format: News-talk
- Network: Fox News Radio
- Affiliations: Compass Media Networks; Premiere Networks; Westwood One; Baltimore Orioles Radio Network; Baltimore Ravens Radio Network

Ownership
- Owner: Cumulus Media; (Radio License Holding SRC, LLC)
- Sister stations: WARM-FM; WIOV-FM; WSOX

History
- First air date: September 1, 1942
- Call sign meaning: Susquehanna Broadcasting Associates (former owner)

Technical information
- Licensing authority: FCC
- Facility ID: 73979
- Class: B
- Power: 5,000 watts (day); 1,000 watts (night)
- Transmitter coordinates: 39°59′57.35″N 76°44′41.88″W
- Translator: 93.9 W230CQ (York)
- Repeater: 96.1 WSOX-HD2 (Red Lion)

Links
- Public license information: Public file; LMS
- Webcast: Listen live; Listen live (via Audacy); Listen live (via iHeartRadio)
- Website: www.newstalkwsba.com

WSBA (910 kHz, "NewsTalk 93.9 & 910 WSBA") is a commercial AM radio station licensed to York, Pennsylvania. The station is owned by Cumulus Media, through licensee Radio License Holding SRC, LLC. It broadcasts a news-talk radio format. The studios are on Susquehanna Plaza Drive near U.S. Route 30.

During the day, WSBA is powered at 5,000 watts. At night, however, to protect other stations on 910 AM from interference, WSBA reduces power to 1,000 watts. It uses a directional antenna with a four-tower array at all times. The transmitter is on Susquehanna Trail in York. The towers are at 121.3 meters (398 ft) elevation with a height of 75.3 meters (247 ft). Their tops are 196.6 meters (645 ft) above sea level. Programming is also heard on 250-watt FM translator W230CQ at 93.9 MHz. It is also simulcast on the HD Radio subchannel of sister station 96.1 WSOX-HD2.

== Programming ==
Most of the weekday schedule is nationally syndicated conservative talk shows, including Michael DelGiorno, Brian Kilmeade, Dan Bongino, Ben Shapiro, Michael Knowles, Matt Walsh, Mark Levin, Dave Ramsey, Red Eye Radio and America in the Morning. Most hours begin with world and national news from Fox News Radio.

Weekends feature shows on money, health, gardening, technology, home improvement and the outdoors. Syndicated weekend programs include The Kim Komando Show, In the House with Jason Chaffetz, The Brett Baier Show, The Chris Plante Show, America at Night with Rick Valdes and The Money Pit Home Improvement Radio Show. WSBA also carries Baltimore Orioles baseball games and Baltimore Ravens football games.

== History ==
=== Waiting for sign-on ===
On July 24, 1942, an article in the Gazette and Daily discussed a new radio station, saying it would go on air in York sometime in the late summer. Otis Morse would be the Program Director and Willis Weaver would be the chief engineer.

In August, the Gazette and Daily ran an advertisement that stated "On the air soon - 900 the mid-point on your dial." A September announcement came in The Gazette and Daily on August 31, 1942. The September 1, 1942, Gazette and Daily Page 2 article announced, 'WSBA On the Air Today'.

=== First day ===
The station signed on the air with a prayer by the Reverend Paul E. V. Shannon of the first United Brethren Church. York Mayor Harry B. Anstine read his Heroes Day proclamation. Much of the programming reflected that the nation was nearing the end of the first year of World War II.

The station had a 240-foot antenna and a 1,000 watt transmitter. An advertisement on page 3 that day called WSBA "York's own radio station."

Nearby, 580 WHP in Harrisburg went on the air in 1925, predating WSBA by 17 years. WLXW (now WHYL) in Carlisle went on the air in 1948, six years after WSBA and WGET in Gettysburg first aired August 27, 1950. WHVR AM in Hanover went into operation on January 7, 1949, on 1280 kHz with a power of 1000 watts.

Other stations in York in the 1950-1970 period included WORK and WNOW-FM and WNOW (AM) which was mainly country.

=== Moving to AM 910 ===
WSBA moved from 900 to 910 kHz on October 21, 1949. It still continued to be listed in radio listings as the old frequency 900 kHz through the middle of the 50s when the Gazette and Daily discontinued the radio listings.

The move allowed WSBA to increase its daytime power to 5,000 watts. WSBA's move to 910 is discussed in more detail in the publication "Susquehanna First 50 Years" by Phillip K. Eberly.

=== Full-service MOR ===
During the 1950-1980 period, WSBA carried a full service, middle of the road (MOR) format of popular music, news, and sports. Ed Wickenheiser was one of the newscasters in the earliest reporting of the "Three Mile Island accident" in 1979 and is cited in the book TMI by investigative reporter Mark Lane.

During Hurricanes Agnes and Eloise, snowstorms, and other weather events, WSBA had frequent updates and information. When disasters hit, regular programming stopped. During the late 50s and early 60s, the station did a rundown of that week's Top 40 Hits on Saturday afternoons.

Ralph Lockwood was a long term morning host during that period and had a fictional sidekick Luscious Laverne. Ed Lincoln was another personality at that time who had a feature, the hit of the week, which was played every night on his program. The feature was available in Sol Kessler's Hi Fi Shop for $.59 during that week.

=== WSBA-FM ===
WSBA management decided to add an FM station. On November 21, 1947, manager Otis Morse IV spoke to the York Exchange Club about frequency modulation (FM) radio. WSBA-FM first appears in a programming guide on February 28, 1949, in the Hanover Sun. The station was on the air at 103.3 MHz.

A seminar was presented featuring Otis Morse from WSBA, with others from WNOW-AM, WORK-AM, and WRZE-FM 98.3 (per radio listing The Evening Sun May 12, 1953) participating.

During the 1960s and 1970s, WSBA was a leading top 40 music station in the Harrisburg-York-Lancaster area. It was also the flagship station of Susquehanna Radio's top 40 stations (which also included WHLO, WARM, and WICE).

=== Cumulus ownership ===
On October 31, 2005, Cumulus Media announced the creation of a new private partnership, Cumulus Media Partners, LLC, formed with Bain Capital, The Blackstone Group and Thomas H. Lee Partners, to purchase Susquehanna Radio Corporation for approximately $1.2 billion. The purchase was completed on May 5, 2006.

At that time, the license for WSBA was transferred to Radio License Holding SRC, LLC., a division of Cumulus Media Partners Susquehanna Corporation.

Logo before translator sign on

On July 20, 2017, translator W253AC (now W230CQ), licensed to York, began simulcasting WSBA programming.

== Translator ==
WSBA programming is simulcast on the following translator:

Broadcast translator for WSBA
Call sign	Frequency	City of license	FID	ERP (W)	HAAT	Class	Transmitter coordinates	FCC info
W230CQ	93.9 FM	York, Pennsylvania	39873	250	200 m (656 ft)	D	39°59′56.4″N 76°41′41.9″W	LMS
