= Cam Robinson (baseball) =

American baseball player (born 1999)

York Revolution
- Pitcher
- Born: September 6, 1999 (age 26); Tampa, Florida, U.S.
- Bats: Right Throws: Right

Cameron Julian Robinson (born September 6, 1999) is an American professional baseball pitcher for the York Revolution of the Atlantic League of Professional Baseball.

== Career ==
Robinson attended University High School in Orlando, Florida.

=== Milwaukee Brewers ===
Robinson was drafted by the Milwaukee Brewers in the 23rd round, with the 684th overall selection, of the 2017 Major League Baseball draft. He made his professional debut that year with the rookie–level Arizona League Brewers and also played for them in 2018 and 2019. He also played for the Rocky Mountain Vibes in 2019.

Robinson did not play in a game in 2020 due to the cancellation of the minor league season because of the COVID-19 pandemic. He returned in 2021 to play for the Single-A Carolina Mudcats, High-A Wisconsin Timber Rattlers and one game for the Double-A Biloxi Shuckers. Robinson started 2022 with Wisconsin before being promoted to Biloxi. On November 15, 2022, the Brewers added Robinson to their 40-man roster to protect him from the Rule 5 draft.

Robinson was optioned to the Triple-A Nashville Sounds to begin the 2023 season. In 21 games split between Biloxi and Nashville, Robinson struggled to an 8.55 ERA with 30 strikeouts and two saves in 20 innings of work. He was designated for assignment by the Brewers on June 14, 2023. He cleared waivers and was sent outright to Double–A Biloxi on June 17. Robinson elected free agency following the season on November 6.

=== New York Mets ===
On December 14, 2023, Robinson signed a minor league contract with the New York Mets. In 28 appearances for the Double-A Binghamton Rumble Ponies, he compiled a 3-1 record and 3.20 ERA with 40 strikeouts across 39 1/3 innings pitched. Robinson elected free agency following the season on November 4, 2024.

=== York Revolution ===
On April 9, 2025, Robinson signed with the York Revolution of the Atlantic League of Professional Baseball. He made 42 relief appearances for the Revolution, compiling a 5-4 record and 0.61 ERA with 49 strikeouts and 16 saves across 44 innings of work. With York, Robinson won the Atlantic League championship.

=== Rieleros de Aguascalientes ===
On December 18, 2025, Robinson signed a minor league contract with the Tampa Bay Rays organization. Robinson was released by the Rays prior to the start of the regular season on March 17, 2026.

On March 23, 2026, Robinson signed with the Rieleros de Aguascalientes of the Mexican League. In 40 games he threw 40.1 innings of relief going 6-1 with a 2.45 ERA with 38 strikeouts and 17 saves.

=== York Revolution (second stint) ===
On August 18, 2026, Robinson signed with the York Revolution of the Atlantic League of Professional Baseball.
