= Harrisburg Broadcast Network =

WHBG TV 20
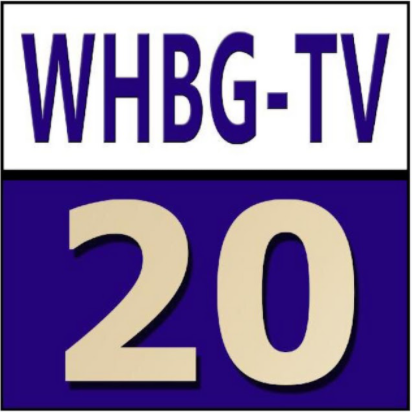

Harrisburg, Pennsylvania; United States
- Channels: Digital: 20

History
- First air date: June 1, 2003
- Call sign meaning: Harrisburg Abbreviation

Links
- Webcast: WHBG20 on YouTube
- Website: Official Website

The Harrisburg Broadcast Network, branded as WHBG TV 20, is a Public, educational, and government access (PEG) cable TV channel in Harrisburg, Pennsylvania, United States. Despite its call sign, it is not an FCC-sanctioned terrestrial television station. It is seen in Harrisburg on Comcast cable channel 20 and on YouTube.

== History ==
WHBG TV 20 broadcasting began on June 1, 2003. The broadcast center, located at 223 Walnut Street in Harrisburg, was dedicated by Harrisburg Mayor Stephen R. Reed and Pennsylvania Governor Ed Rendell. The network was produced in a partnership with CN8, owned by Comcast. Comcast also contributed money towards the new studio and equipment worth $400,000. In 2004, WHBG expanded online.
