= WOYK =

Sports radio station in York, Pennsylvania

- York, Pennsylvania; United States
- Broadcast area: South Central Pennsylvania
- Frequency: 1350 kHz
- Branding: SportsRadio 98.9 & WOYK 1350

Programming
- Format: Sports radio
- Affiliations: Fox Sports Radio; Westwood One; Hershey Bears; Philadelphia Phillies; Philadelphia Eagles; Philadelphia 76ers; Washington Capitals; York Revolution

Ownership
- Owner: York Professional Baseball Club, LLC

History
- First air date: March 17, 1932
- Former call signs: WORK (1932–1973); WZIX (1973–1981)

Technical information
- Licensing authority: FCC
- Facility ID: 73873
- Class: B
- Power: 5,000 watts (day); 1,000 watts (night)
- Transmitter coordinates: 39°56′00″N 76°49′06″W
- Translator: 98.9 W255DJ (York)

Links
- Public license information: Public file; LMS
- Webcast: Listen live
- Website: www.989woyk.com

WOYK (1350 kHz) is a commercial AM radio station licensed to York, Pennsylvania, and also serving the Harrisburg, and Lancaster radio markets. The station is owned by the York Revolution. The Revolution is an Atlantic League of Professional Baseball team, whose games air on WOYK.

The station's transmitter is off North Emig Mill Road in West Manchester Township, Pennsylvania. WOYK broadcasts at 5,000 watts by day, using a non-directional antenna. But at night, to protect other stations on 1350 AM, it switches to a directional antenna and drops to 1,000 watts. WOYK's programming is also simulcast on translator station W255DJ (98.9 FM).

WOYK airs a sports radio format, primarily from the Fox Sports Radio and also airing the syndicated Dan Patrick Show.

== History ==
WOYK is the oldest radio station in York, having signed on the air on March 17, 1932. For most of its history it used the call sign WORK. It was first owned by the York Broadcasting Company and was powered at 1,000 watts, heard on 1000 AM. After the enactment of the North American Regional Broadcasting Agreement (NARBA) in 1941, it switched to its current frequency at 1350 AM.

WORK was an affiliate of the NBC Red Network and the Mutual Broadcasting System, carrying their dramas, comedies, news, sports, soap operas, game shows and big band broadcasts during the "Golden Age of Radio". In the 1950s, it got a boost to 5,000 watts by day, while still broadcasting at 1,000 watts at night, its current power. As network programming moved to television, WORK switched to a full service middle of the road music format, changing call letters to WZIX in 1973. On October 25, 1981, at 7 a.m., WZIX changed its call sign to WOYK. In the 1980s, it shifted to an oldies format. On October 14, 1991, at 9 a.m., it shifted to a classic country format before going to all-sports in April 1999.

The station has a rich history of sports broadcasting going back to the 1930s. During its history, WORK carried the Baltimore Orioles from the 1950s through the early 1980s and then again from 2007 to 2009.

For many years, through the 1960s, the station carried Philadelphia Phillies baseball as well. For years, NFL football games, featuring the Baltimore Colts, were carried. WOYK has a long history of carrying local high school and college sports. The station currently broadcasts York Revolution minor league baseball, Hershey Bears hockey, York College of Pennsylvania basketball, NCAA basketball, and professional football, including the playoffs and the Super Bowl. As of the 2022 season, WOYK now broadcasts Philadelphia Eagles football games.

Logo before translator sign on

In March 2019, WOYK added a 250-watt translator station, 98.9 W255DJ, and rebranded as "SportsRadio 98.9 & WOYK 1350."

== Translator ==
Broadcast translator for WOYK
Call sign	Frequency	City of license	FID	ERP (W)	Class	Transmitter coordinates	FCC info
W255DJ	98.9 FM	York, Pennsylvania	202184	250	D	39°56′30″N 76°41′55″W	LMS
