= WFVY =

Radio station in Lebanon, Pennsylvania

- Lebanon, Pennsylvania; United States
- Broadcast area: Lebanon Valley
- Frequency: 100.1 MHz
- Branding: Froggy Valley 100.1

Programming
- Format: Country
- Affiliations: Compass Media Networks; Hershey Bears

Ownership
- Owner: Seven Mountains Media; (Southern Belle Media Family, LLC)
- Sister stations: WLBR

History
- First air date: February 1948 (as WLBR-FM)
- Former call signs: WLBR-FM (1947–1974); WUFM (1974–1992); WQIC (1992–2020)
- Former frequencies: 104.1 MHz (1947–1948)
- Call sign meaning: "Froggy Valley"

Technical information
- Licensing authority: FCC
- Facility ID: 36878
- Class: A
- ERP: 3,000 watts
- HAAT: 81 meters (266 ft)
- Transmitter coordinates: 40°21′37.3″N 76°27′29.8″W

Links
- Public license information: Public file; LMS
- Webcast: Listen Live
- Website: myfroggyvalley.com

WFVY (100.1 FM, "Froggy Valley 100.1") is a commercial radio station in Lebanon, Pennsylvania, United States. The station is owned by Seven Mountains Media, through licensee Southern Belle Media Family, LLC, with a country music format. WFVY also broadcasts local high school sporting events and Hershey Bears hockey games.

WFVY shares studios with sister station WLBR (1270 AM). Both stations were owned by the Lebanon Broadcasting Company prior to their sale to Forever Media in 2020 and Seven Mountains Media in 2022.

== History ==
The Federal Communications Commission granted Lebanon Broadcasting Company a construction permit for a new FM station on 104.1 MHz on July 26, 1947, with the WLBR-FM call sign. The station signed on for the first time in 1948. On March 24, 1949, the FCC reassigned the station to 100.1 MHz. The FCC then granted the station its first license on April 15, 1949.

The station's call sign was changed to WUFM effective October 29, 1974. The format changed to soft rock.

On November 27, 1992, the station changed call signs to WQIC, rebranded as "Q-100" and changed to a Top-40/hot AC hybrid format. "Q-100" was an affiliate of Open House Party. In March 1997, the station dropped the "Q-100" branding and returned to an adult contemporary format.

After over 70 years of family ownership, Lebanon Broadcasting president Robert Etter announced on August 23, 2019, that he would be selling WLBR and WQIC to Hollidaysburg-based Forever Media for $1.225 million. The transaction was finalized on December 31, 2019.

On February 25, 2020, the station's call sign was changed to WFVY. Despite this, the station continued to use WQIC in its branding for a short time. On May 19, 2020, WFVY changed formats from adult contemporary to country, branded as "Froggy Valley 100.1".

It was announced on October 12, 2022, that Forever Media was selling 34 stations, including WFVY and WLBR, to State College-based Seven Mountains Media (a firm owned by Forever founder Kerby Confer's daughter Kristin Cantrell) for $17.375 million. The deal closed on January 1, 2023.
