= WGET =

Radio station in Gettysburg, Pennsylvania

Coordinates: 39°50′30.3″N 77°13′23.9″W

- Gettysburg, Pennsylvania; United States
- Broadcast area: South Central Pennsylvania
- Frequency: 1320 kHz

Programming
- Language: English
- Format: Contemporary Christian
- Affiliations: K-Love

Ownership
- Owner: Educational Media Foundation; (K-Love Inc.)
- Sister stations: WKYJ

History
- First air date: August 27, 1950
- Call sign meaning: Gettysburg

Technical information
- Licensing authority: FCC
- Facility ID: 67132
- Class: B
- Power: 1,000 watts (day); 500 watts (night)
- Translator: 93.7 W229DK (Gettysburg)

Links
- Public license information: Public file; LMS
- Website: www.klove.com

WGET (1320 AM) is a radio station licensed to Gettysburg, Pennsylvania, United States, and serving South Central Pennsylvania. It is owned by the Educational Media Foundation and broadcasts K-Love.

By day, WGET broadcasts at 1,000 watts. But to protect other stations on 1320 AM, from interference, at night, it reduces power to 500 watts. Programming is also heard on FM translator W229DK at 93.7 FM.

== History ==
The station made its debut broadcast on August 27, 1950. Robert Smith of New Oxford, Pennsylvania, was the announcer who put WGET on the air. 20 years later, on August 27, 1970, he and Lester M. Blair of Gettysburg, Pennsylvania, an engineer/announcer, were the only two people still working for WGET. The station signed on with power of 250 watts. As an aside, Walter Lane, photographer and amateur radio operator W3KGN in town had a transmitter that produced 275 watts. In March 1961, Judge W.C. Sheeley, who had made the principal address at the opening ceremony, pressed a button in the press room of the Hotel Gettysburg which converted WGET from a 250-watt to a 1,000-watt AM station and a 10,000-watt FM station. At one time using a single tower, there are now has three AM towers and a 500-foot FM tower.

In January 1951, WGET affiliated with the short-lived Progressive Broadcasting System radio network. From the 1960s to the 1980s, WGET and later WGET-FM were affiliated with the Mutual Broadcasting System.

For much of the early 2000s, WGET had a full service, adult contemporary format. In January 2011, the station flipped to a sports radio format as an affiliate of the Fox Sports Radio network. In June 2013, it switched affiliations to ESPN Radio.

In September 2015, WGEY sold to Forever Media for $4.25 million.

On May 21, 2019, WGET, along with sister station WHVR in York, Pennsylvania, began simulcasting an adult contemporary format with the launch of FM translator W229DK at 93.7 FM which rebroadcasts WGET.

On January 1, 2022, WGET and WHVR changed their formats to contemporary hit radio. With this change, they ended their simulcast and were branded as "Nu 93.7" and "Nu 95.3", respectively. The "Nu" branding was shared with WNUU (92.7) in nearby Starview.

On November 1, WGET and WHVR dropped their top 40/CHR format and began stunting with Christmas music, branded as "Santa 93.7", with a new format to launch in January 2023. On January 1, the stations returned to an adult contemporary format, and revived the "Happy" branding that had been used prior to January 2022. WNUU concurrently made identical format changes and became WPPY. The stations again began playing Christmas music under the "Santa" name on November 1, and annually ever since.

K-Love Inc. (the Educational Media Foundation) acquired WGET and WPPY in Starview from Forever Media in a deal filed in April 2025.

== Previous logos ==
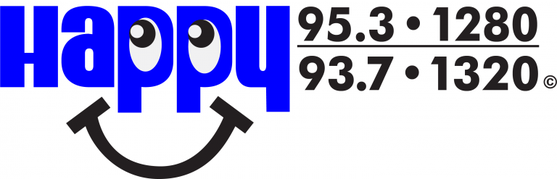
