= WROZ =

- Lancaster, Pennsylvania; United States
- Broadcast area: South Central Pennsylvania
- Frequency: 101.3 MHz
- Branding: Air1

Programming
- Language: English
- Format: Contemporary worship music
- Network: Air1

Ownership
- Owner: Educational Media Foundation; (K-LOVE, Inc.)
- Sister stations: WKHL; WKYJ

History
- First air date: October 9, 1946
- Former call signs: WGAL-FM (1947–1977); WNCE (1977–1992)
- Former frequencies: 45.5 MHz (1944–1946) (CP); 92.7 MHz (1946–1947)
- Call sign meaning: "Rose" (previous branding)

Technical information
- Licensing authority: FCC
- Facility ID: 25865
- Class: B
- ERP: 7,400 watts
- HAAT: 379 meters (1,243 ft)
- Transmitter coordinates: 40°2′4.3″N 76°37′6.9″W

Links
- Public license information: Public file; LMS
- Webcast: Listen live
- Website: www.air1.com

WROZ (101.3 MHz) is a non-commercial FM radio station licensed to Lancaster and serving South Central Pennsylvania. The station is owned and operated by the Educational Media Foundation and carries its Air1 Christian worship music radio format. WROZ's studios and offices were formerly located off Route 283 at 1996 Auction Road in Manheim.

WROZ's transmitter tower is co-located with former sister station WGAL-TV. It is off Tower Road in Hellam Township, York County at (40°2′4.3″N 76°37′6.9″W).

== History ==
=== Early years ===
On February 5, 1944, the Federal Communications Commission (FCC) granted WGAL, Inc. a construction permit to build an FM station. WGAL 1490 AM was owned by John Steinman and James Steinman The new FM station would be on 45.5 MHz. The original FM band was found between 42-50 MHz.

The FCC created the current FM band on June 27, 1945. So the new FM station was reassigned to 92.7 MHz on July 29, 1946. On January 22, 1947, the station was granted the WGAL-FM call sign, and on June 27, 1947, the station was reassigned to 101.3 MHz.

The FCC granted WGAL-FM its first license on November 16, 1951.

WGAL-FM was a sister station to WGAL (1490 AM, now WRKY). In 1949, the region's first TV station also went on the air, WGAL-TV. The three stations were owned by the Steinman Family, which also owned two local daily newspapers, the Intelligencer Journal and the Lancaster New Era. At first WGAL-FM simulcast its AM counterpart.

On May 21, 1959, WGAL, Inc., was granted a construction permit by the FCC to install a new transmitter for the FM station at the WGAL-TV tower in Hellam Township, York County and side-mount a new antenna on the TV tower. A new license with the updated facilities was granted on July 28, 1960.

=== Beautiful Music ===
By the early 1970s, the station had switched its format to beautiful music, a format of soft instrumentals with limited talk and commercials. It competed with several other beautiful music outlets in the Lancaster and surrounding radio markets, including WHP-FM in Harrisburg (97.3 FM, now WRVV) and WSBA-FM in York (103.3 FM, now WARM-FM).

In March 1976, WGAL, Inc. sold WGAL-FM, along with WGAL (AM), to Hall Communications for $850,000. The effective date of the sale was February 17, 1977, when the FM station's license was voluntarily assigned to Hall Communications. The station's call sign was changed from WGAL-FM to WNCE that day. The station's branding was changed to Nice 101. The station's easy listening format was not changed.

As the 1980s were ending, most easy listening stations around the country were trying to update their format. WSBA-FM in nearby York had switched to soft adult contemporary as WARM-FM. In response, WNCE began adding more vocals to its playlist.

=== Soft AC ===
In 1992, the easy listening format came to an end. The station changed its call sign to WROZ on November 16, 1992. That was coupled with a switch to soft adult contemporary music, rebranding as The Rose. Competitor WHP-FM in nearby Harrisburg had already abandoned its easy listening format in March 1992, switching to Rock Adult Contemporary as WRVV The River.

On May 14, 2015, at 12 p.m., WROZ rebranded as fun 101.3, as it flipped to a simple adult contemporary format. In addition, it promised to play "Always Six Songs In a Row, Always".

=== Sale to EMF ===
On July 13, 2021, Hall Communications announced it would sell WROZ to the Educational Media Foundation (EMF) for $1.725 million. EMF already maintained a presence in South Central Pennsylvania through K-Love station WKHL (92.1) and a translator station in Carlisle for the Air1 network, but neither of those stations' signals put an adequate signal into the Lancaster or York areas.

On September 2, EMF filed an application with the FCC to modify the status of the station's license from commercial to non-commercial. The FCC subsequently granted a reassignment of the station's license to EMF on September 15. The sale consummated on September 30, 2021. At 5 p.m. that day, after the station ran a "Farewell to Fun" week (also hammering in the finality, the DJs, who helmed the station right up to the final song, declared the celebration, and the final day specifically, as the "series finale" of Fun), WROZ temporarily went silent. The final song played on WROZ as fun 101.3 was "These Are Days" by 10,000 Maniacs, followed by one final station identification before signing off.

Later in October, WROZ signed back on the air, this time broadcasting EMF's Air1 network.

=== Christmas music ===
WROZ changed its format to all Christmas music each year for most of November and December, rebranding as "The Christmas Station." It returned to its regular format on December 26. 2020, marking its final months as a commercial AC station.

== Signal note ==
WROZ is short-spaced to three other Class B stations:

WBEB B101.1 (licensed to serve Philadelphia, Pennsylvania) and WWDC DC101 (licensed to serve Washington, D.C.) both operate on 101.1 MHz, a first adjacent channel to WROZ. The distance between WROZ's transmitter and WBEB's transmitter is 73 miles, while the distance between WROZ's transmitter and WWDC's transmitter is 75 miles, as determined by FCC rules. The minimum distance between two Class B stations operating on first adjacent channels according to current FCC rules is 105 miles.

WGGY Froggy 101 (licensed to serve Scranton, Pennsylvania) operates on the same channel as WROZ and the distance between the stations' transmitters is 106 miles as determined by FCC rules. The minimum distance between two Class B stations operating on the same channel according to current FCC rules is 150 miles.
