= York Revolution =

American independent baseball team

Logo
Cap insignia

Information
- League: Atlantic League of Professional Baseball (North Division)
- Location: York, Pennsylvania
- Ballpark: WellSpan Park
- Founded: 2006
- Nickname: The Revs
- Atlantic League championships: (5) 2010, 2011, 2017, 2024, 2025
- Division championships: (5) 2010, 2011, 2017, 2024, 2025
- Colors: Navy blue, gold, white, silver
- Mascot: DownTown
- Retired numbers: 42, 8, 35, 5
- Ownership: York Professional Baseball Club LLC
- President: Ben Shipley
- General manager: Ben Shipley
- Manager: Rick Forney
- Media: WOYK 1350AM; York Daily Record; York Dispatch
- Website: yorkrevolution.com

The York Revolution is an American professional baseball team based in York, Pennsylvania. It is a member of the North Division of the Atlantic League of Professional Baseball, an independent "partner league" of Major League Baseball. The Revolution plays its home games at WellSpan Park, which opened in the surrounding Arch Street neighborhood in 2007. The team has won the league championship five times, most recently over the High Point Rockers on October 1, 2025.

Before the Revolution's inaugural season, baseball fans in York had waited almost four decades for the return of professional baseball to their city.

In 2012, the Revolution franchise/team introduced a new brand and logo to also emphasize York's contributions to American history in the Industrial Revolution of the early 19th century, with a secondary emphasis on patriotism. The southeast Pennsylvania region is home to many industrial manufacturers such as Harley-Davidson, Stauffer's, and York International/Johnson Controls.

== History of York baseball ==
=== York White Roses ===
The York White Roses (known as the York Pirates in their last two seasons of existence, because of their affiliation then with Major League Baseball's Pittsburgh Pirates), played for 85 years in York from 1884 to 1969. The White Roses were bitter rivals of the Lancaster Red Roses baseball team of Lancaster, Pennsylvania, county seat and largest town in adjacent Lancaster County to the east. Both teams were named after the two warring 15th-century royal houses and political factions from the historic cities of York and Lancaster in the Kingdom of England's 32-years-long civil war in the Wars of the Roses (1455–1487).

=== Revolution ===
York tried for ten years to bring professional baseball back to the city. The process looked promising in 2003, until politics halted the project. The new baseball stadium was to be located at the Small Athletic Field, on York City School District property, but the district school board voted negatively as they did not believe the ballpark would be the best use of district money and land. For three years, political and financial discussions continued to delay the project. A new site for the stadium was agreed upon in the Arch Street neighborhood, and that plan was successful. Other sites that were considered but not chosen included Hoffman Field and the Ohio Blenders of PA, Inc.

In April 2006, the American minor league Atlantic League of Professional Baseball formally announced an expansion team for the city of York. One of the prominent members of the team's ownership group was Brooks Robinson, a Golden Glove award-winner, All-Star, and World Series champion third-baseman who played briefly with the minor league old York White Roses and later further south in the Major Leagues with the Baltimore Orioles of the American League from 1955 to 1977. In addition to Robinson memorials erected at Oriole Park at Camden Yards in southwest Downtown Baltimore, a statue of Robinson was erected and dedicated in York in the area outside the Arch Street stadium entrance named Brooks Robinson Plaza in his honor. Robinson died in 2023.

The Revolution's inaugural season saw the team finish third in the South Division with a record of 58–68. Their fortunes changed quickly, however, with 2008 bringing a first-place finish in the newly named Freedom Division and the franchise's first trip to the playoffs. The Revs were ousted early in the 2008 playoffs, but were back in 2010 when they won the Atlantic League championship, the first professional baseball title the city had won since the 1969 York Pirates of the Eastern League. The Revs took home the trophy again the next season in 2011, winning back-to-back championships and becoming just the second team in league history to accomplish the feat. They returned to the playoffs for a third straight season in 2012, but lost in the opening round.

In the 2009 preseason, the Revolution joined the two other Atlantic League teams in holding their spring training at home instead of the traditional site in Lakeland, Florida. The respective ownership groups of the three teams made this decision to cut costs during the 2008 financial crisis and the Great Recession.

On March 24, 2014, the Revolution became the first professional baseball team to accept Bitcoins as a form of payment for ticket purchases.

On August 2, 2025, pitchers Tyler Palm, Ethan Firoved, Ian Churchill, Brendan Cellucci, Nick Mikolajchak, and Cam Robinson combined to record a franchise-record 20 strikeouts in a win over the Charleston Dirty Birds.

On June 18, 2026, the Revolution forfeited a game against the Southern Maryland Blue Crabs when they couldn't field the minimum-required nine players willing to wear the uniform jersey chosen for Pride Night. The team continued the other programming for the Pride event at WellSpan Park, pledged a $10,000 donation to the Rainbow Rose Center, and allowed ticket holders to use their tickets for another 2026 regular-season home game.

=== All-Star Games ===
The Revolution hosted the 2011 Atlantic League All-Star Game at the four-year-old WellSpan Park on Arch Street on July 14, 2011. Seven Revs players were named to the All-Star team in addition to manager Andy Etchenbarren (former longtime player with the Baltimore Orioles), who skippered the Freedom Division. In front of a sellout crowd, two of those Revolution players, Corey Thurman and Val Majewski, helped to lead the Freedom Division to a 7–0 shutout over the Liberty Division. Thurman started the game, throwing two shutout innings and Majewski hit a solo homerun over the right field wall to start the scoring. Michael Hernandez of the Somerset Patriots ended up taking home the game's MVP award with a solo blast of his own and an RBI triple in the seventh inning. Prior to the game, Val Majewski participated in the home run derby and was a member of the winning team. The first pitch of the Atlantic League All-Star Game was thrown out by former local Dover High School and later National Football League Green Bay Packer player John Kuhn.

The Revolution again hosted the Atlantic League All-Star Game at WellSpan Park eight years later in July 2019.

== Logos and uniforms ==
The Revolution's original primary logo

From 2007 to 2010, the York Revolution's team colors were navy blue, red, white, brass, and silver. The original brand focused exclusively on patriotic symbols such as the United States flag and the bald eagle national bird symbol of America. The team re-branded after four years for the 2011 season to the different look used today.

The current team colors of the York Revolution are navy blue, yellow, white, and silver. The "Revolution" wordmark is colored white in an industrial script centered on a navy blue background. The word "York" is featured above in white with a baseball standing in for the letter "o". The entire wordmark is outlined in silver. Centered above the wordmark is an American bald eagle holding a baseball bat.

The York Revolution wear caps produced by the firms of OC Sports and uniforms by New Balance. The caps are navy blue throughout with a stylized white "Y" topped with an eagle's head clutching a baseball. The entire cap logo is outlined in silver. The Revolution wordmark is centered on the back, lower edge of the cap. There is also an all yellow hat featuring the York "Y" being grasped by an eagle talon.

The home jerseys are white with navy blue and yellow paneling down the sides. They feature a navy blue cursive serif wordmark with a yellow outline that pays tribute to the Baltimore Orioles' style of script on their black / orange and white team jerseys. The Revolution away jersey is gray with navy blue and yellow paneling down the sides. Across the chest is the cursive "York" wordmark in navy blue outlined in yellow with a traditional underscore. The team also sports a third alternate jersey, which has changed numerous times over the years.

On June 18, 2026, the York Revolution forfeited a scheduled game after too many on its roster of 28 players were not willing to wear the game's rainbow-sleeved jerseys. The game had been scheduled as part of the team's 11th annual Pride in the Park event, which was still held.

== Season-by-season records ==
York Revolution
Season	Record	Win %	Finish	Manager	Playoffs
2007	58–68	.460	3rd	Chris Hoiles	Did not qualify for playoffs
2008	71–69	.507	1st	Chris Hoiles	Lost Division Championship vs. Somerset Patriots, 2–0
2009	53–87	.379	4th	Chris Hoiles/Sam Snider/Andy Etchebarren	Did not qualify for playoffs
2010	69–71	.493	2nd	Andy Etchebarren	Won Freedom Division vs. Somerset Patriots, 3–2; Won Atlantic League Championship vs. Bridgeport Bluefish, 3–0
2011	73–51	.589	1st	Andy Etchebarren	Won Freedom Division vs. Lancaster Barnstormers, 3–2; Won Atlantic League Championship vs. Long Island Ducks, 3–1
2012	79–61	.564	2nd	Andy Etchebarren	Lost Division Championship vs. Lancaster Barnstormers, 3–0
2013	65–75	.464	4th	Mark Mason	Did not qualify for playoffs
2014	78–62	.557	3rd	Mark Mason	Lost Division Championship vs. Sugar Land Skeeters, 3–2
2015	64–75	.460	4th	Mark Mason	Did not qualify for playoffs
2016	76–64	.543	1st	Mark Mason	Lost Division Championship vs. Sugar Land Skeeters, 3–0
2017	68–72	.486	2nd	Mark Mason	Won Freedom Division vs. Southern Maryland Bluecrabs, 3–1; Won Atlantic League Championship vs. Long Island Ducks, 3–0
2018	68–58	.540	3rd	Mark Mason	Did not qualify for playoffs
2019	75–65	.534	1st	Mark Mason	Lost Division Championship vs. Sugar Land Skeeters, 3–1
2020	Season canceled due to the COVID-19 pandemic				
2021	56–64	.467	4th	Mark Mason	Did not qualify for playoffs
2022	56–76	.424	4th	Mark Mason	Did not qualify for playoffs
2023	71–54	.568	1st	Rick Forney	Did not qualify for playoffs
2024	80–45	.640	1st	Rick Forney	Won North Division vs. Lancaster Stormers, 3–1; Won Atlantic League Championship vs. Charleston Dirty Birds, 3–0
2025	74–52	.587	1st	Rick Forney	Won North Division vs. Lancaster Stormers, 3–0; Won Atlantic League Championship vs. High Point Rockers, 3–1
Totals	1,165–1,097	.515	—	—	33–22 Playoff record 5 North Division championships, 5 Atlantic League championships

== Tradition ==
=== War of the Roses ===
The cities of Lancaster and York in South Central Pennsylvania, US have a historical rivalry in all sporting events from the high-school level to the professional. Since the cities are named after the English cities of Lancaster and York, their former Pennsylvania baseball teams were named for the opposing sides of the Wars of the Roses. As a metaphor, "War of the Roses" describes the intense baseball matches fought between the Lancaster Red Roses and the York White Roses. With the addition of York to the Atlantic League, the Revolution and Stormers now continue this tradition as they battle each other for lower Susquehanna supremacy.

The "War of the Roses" was rekindled with the sound of celebratory cannon fire at the start of the 2007 Atlantic League season in Wrightsville, a borough located on the Susquehanna River, the natural boundary between Lancaster and York counties. The winner of the War of the Roses is presented with the Community Cup, while the defeated team is obligated to sing the ballpark classic "Take Me Out to the Ball Game" and plant a rose garden at the opponent's ballpark with their representative color: red for Lancaster, white for York. The first Community Cup was championed by the Stormers in the 2007 season, though the Revolution avenged them by winning it in 2008. The clubs also competed in the Route 30 Showdown in 2009–2011, an annual cross-county doubleheader inadvertently created after the 2008 season by a rain-delay.

Community Cup Record
Year	Series Winner	Stormers W	Revolution W	Notes
2007	Stormers	10	8	first Community Cup
2008	Revolution	9	11	
2009	Stormers	14	6	
2010	Revolution	4	16	2nd-earliest cup win; July 24
2011	Stormers	10	8	
2012	Stormers	10	10	Lancaster retains cup in a tie
2013	Revolution	8	12	
2014	Revolution	7	13	first consecutive cup win
2015	Stormers	15	11	
2016	Stormers	11	9	
2017	Revolution	9	10	
2018	Stormers	10	8	
2019	Revolution	8	11	
2020	Season canceled due to the COVID-19 pandemic			
2021	Revolution	12	13	
2022	Stormers	18	14	
2023	Revolution	8	13	
2024	Revolution	4	18	Earliest cup win; July 2
2025	Revolution	7	14	
Overall	Revolution (10–8)	173	201	

== Philanthropy ==
In 2013, the team started the York Revolution Community Fund through the York County Community Foundation. The team raises funds through jersey auctions, memorabilia sales, 50/50 raffles, and the sale of other items like the Revs Kitchen cookbook, which sees Revolution players, coaches, and staff sharing their favorite recipes. The money raised by the fund is then given back to the community in the form of grants to local non-profit groups who provide services directly to York County.

The Revolution benefit the Big Brothers Big Sisters youth mentoring organization annually by wearing purple jerseys that are auctioned off immediately following the Purple Jersey Night game. Additionally, the team also partnered with Columbia Gas to donate $50 to the York Red Cross for each run scored by a Revolution player.

== Radio ==
The official broadcast home of the York Revolution is WOYK 1350 AM, with Darrell Henry as the "Voice of the Revolution". Prior to the 2010 season, games were heard on WSBA 910 AM.

On October 15, 2026, York Revolution made an agreement with Forever Media to acqiure their York stations for $3.1 million, under the name On First Media.

== Television ==
While Revolution games are not broadcast via a traditional television network, each game was streamed live via a "York Revs TV" YouTube channel through 2018, and beginning in 2019 via the WOYK YouTube channel.

== On-field entertainment ==
=== Mascots ===
The York Revolution's official mascot is an anthropomorphic, blue creature named DownTown. He wears the team's home jersey, the primary cap worn backwards, with blue and white sneakers. DownTown debuted on March 31, 2007, at the Mascot: The Musical production at the DreamWrights Theater. His full name is DownTown Yorkie, and is the result of a sponsorship deal with Downtown Inc, a partnership of community-minded companies that work to improve and celebrate downtown York. DownTown wears a jersey with the number "00". The mascot was designed by the Raymond Entertainment Group, which also produced the Phillie Phanatic's costume.

DownTown has a cousin named SmallTown, who will occasionally turn up at games. He debuted in 2009 and wears the number "1/2". A kid wears the costume and follows DownTown for a day.

The Revolution also host a character named Cannonball Charlie, who fires a cannon after each home run or home game victory by the team. He wears the uniform of a period Continental Army soldier.

== Single season records ==
=== Offensive ===
- Hits: 172.....James Shanks, 2010
- Doubles: 47.....Frankie Tostado, 2025
- Triples: 17.....Eric Patterson, 2014
- Homeruns: 41.....Telvin Nash, 2019
- RBIs: 107.....Chris Nowak, 2012
- Walks: 108.....Nellie Rodríguez, 2022
- Stolen bases: 78.....Rudy Martin Jr., 2024

=== Pitching ===
- Wins: 15.....Chris Cody, 2013
- Strikeouts: 139.....Chris Cody, 2013
- Saves: 35.....Mike DeMark, 2016

== Atlantic League All-Stars ==
The following players were named to the Atlantic League All-Star team in each particular season. An asterisk (*) indicates the player participated in the home run derby.

2007

- Chris Cooper (LHP)
- Matt Dryer (INF)
- Nate Espy* (INF)
- Chris Steinborn (LHP)
- Luis Taveras (C)

2008

- Sandy Aracena (C)
- Jason Aspito (OF)
- Nick McCurdy (RHP)
- Jason Olson (RHP)

2009

- Tom Collaro (DH)
- Keoni DeRenne (INF)
- Chris Hoiles (MGR)
- Jason Kershner (LHP)
- Corey Thurman (RHP)

2010

- Ian Bladergroen* (1B)
- Ramon Castro (SS)
- Scott Grimes (CF)
- Derell McCall (RHP)
- John Pachot (C)
- Jesus Sanchez (LHP)
- James Shanks (LF)

2011

- Matt DeSalvo (RHP)
- Andy Etchenbarren (MGR)
- Eric Eymann (SS)
- Vince Harrison (3B)
- Val Majewski* (CF)
- Octavio Martinez (C)
- James Shanks (LF)
- Corey Thurman (RHP)

2012

- Andy Etchenbarren (MGR)
- Brandon Haveman (CF)
- Michael Hernandez (DH)
- Andrew Perez (2B)
- Adam Thomas (RHP)
- Corey Thurman (RHP)

2013

- Chris Cody (LHP)
- Salvador Paniagua (C)
- Eric Patterson (SS)
- Andres Perez (2B)
- Michael Wuertz (RHP)

2014

- Rommie Lewis (LHP)
- Johan Limonta (INF/OF)
- Eric Patterson (2B)
- Wilson Valdez (SS)

2015

- Brandon Boggs (OF)
- Luis De La Cruz (C)
- Stephen Penney (RHP)
- Andres Perez (INF)
- Bryan Pounds (INF)
- Logan Williamson (LHP)

2016

- Mike DeMark (P)
- Ricardo Gomez (P)
- Joel Guzman (DH)
- Andres Perez (INF)
- Travis Witherspoon (OF)

2017

- Brad Allen (RHP)
- Michael Burgess (INF)
- Alonzo Harris (OF)
- Chase Huchingson (LHP)
- Isaias Tejeda (C)
- Travis Witherspoon (OF)

2018

- Mitch Atkins (RHP)
- Robert Carson (LHP)
- Welington Dotel (OF)
- Jared Mitchell (OF)
- Grant Sides (RHP)

2019

- Mitch Atkins (RHP)
- Henry Castillo (OF)
- Ryan Dent (INF)
- Welington Dotel (OF)
- Jameson McGrane (RHP)
- Telvin Nash (INF)
- James Skelton (C)
- Isaias Tejeda (OF)

2020

Season canceled due to the COVID-19 pandemic

2021

- Nellie Rodríguez (1B)

2022

- Carlos Franco (3B)

2023

- Drew Mendoza (1B)

2024

- Donovan Casey (OF)
- Rudy Martin Jr. (OF)
- Matt McDermott (SS)
- John Olsen (RHP)
- Matt Turner (LHP)

2025

- Jalen Miller (2B)
- Cam Robinson (CL)

== Atlantic League/national awards ==
Player of the Year

- Scott Grimes, 2010 (co)

Manager/Executive of the Year

- Andy Etchenbarren, 2011
- Mark Mason, 2014
- John Gibson, 2021

Baseball America All-Independent Team

- Scott Grimes (OF), 2010
- Chris Nowak (DH), 2011
- Ramon Castro (2B), 2011
- Chris Nowak (1B), 2012
- Andres Perez (2B), 2012

== Notable alumni ==
These are some of the notable players who made it to the majors after playing in York. The years in parentheses indicate when they were with the Revs.

- Tike Redman (2007)
- Scott Rice (2011)
- Ian Thomas (2012)
- Bubby Rossman (2021)

== Retired numbers ==
- 5 – Brooks Robinson

Robinson began his professional baseball career in York, playing 95 games for the White Roses in 1955. He had a successful 23-year career in MLB, all spent with the Baltimore Orioles. He was inducted into the National Baseball Hall of Fame in 1983 and was a member of the Revolution's ownership group.

- 8 – Andy Etchebarren

"Etch" spent 15 years in MLB, 12 of them with the Baltimore Orioles. He managed the Revolution for four seasons (2009–2012), compiling 237 wins and guiding the team to three straight playoff appearances, including back-to-back Atlantic League championships. He retired from baseball at the end of the 2012 season.

- 35 – Corey Thurman

Thurman spent eight seasons in the Atlantic League, all with the Revolution. He is the franchise's all-time leader in wins (66), strikeouts (667), and innings pitched (980 1/3) while ranking second in Atlantic League history in the same categories. He was a three-time All-Star and two-time Atlantic League champion.

- 42 – Jackie Robinson

Robinson was the first African-American to play in MLB when he started for the Brooklyn Dodgers in 1947. He spent his entire 10-year career in Brooklyn and was inducted into the National Baseball Hall of Fame in 1962. His number was retired throughout professional baseball on April 15, 1997.

== Current roster ==
York Revolution roster
Active roster		Coaching staff
Pitchers: 29 Shane Gray; 16 Hunter Gregory; 31 Rhett Kouba; 36 Dawson Lane; 34 Nick Mikolajchak; 40 Josh Mollerus; 27 Jordan Morales; 12 Jack Nedrow; 10 Hunter Parsons; 21 Nicholas Regalado; 1 Alonzo Richardson; 14 Joely Rodriguez; 13 Braden Scott; 33 Ryan Shreve; 2 Chris Vallimont	Catchers: 11 Eddie Arteaga; 18 Austin Bates; Infielders: 4 Ben Blackwell; 2 Josh Day; 9 Nick Dunn; 23 Brandon Lewis; 20 Jackson Ross; 22 Jacob Teter; Outfielders: 3 Devonte Brown; 7 Brian Ray; 6 Tomo Otosaka; 15 Mike Rosario	Manager: 43 Rick Forney; Coaches: 24 Joe Harris (Pitching); 44 Derek Wolf (Hitting); Disabled list; ‡ Inactive list; § Suspended list; updated April 22, 2026

Achievements
Preceded by Sugar Land Skeeters; 2016	Atlantic League champions York Revolution; 2017	Succeeded by Sugar Land Skeeters; 2018
Preceded by Somerset Patriots; 2009	Atlantic League champions York Revolution; 2010, 2011	Succeeded by Long Island Ducks; 2012

Achievements
Preceded by Sugar Land Skeeters; 2016	Freedom Division champions York Revolution; 2017	Succeeded by Sugar Land Skeeters; 2018
Preceded by Somerset Patriots; 2009	Freedom Division champions York Revolution; 2010, 2011	Succeeded by Lancaster Barnstormers; 2012
