= WARM-FM =

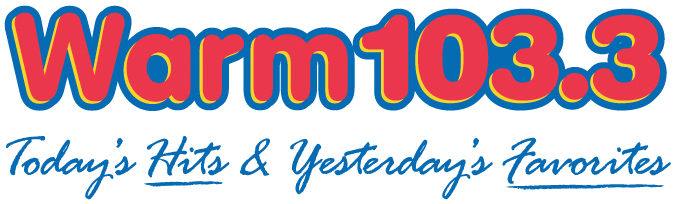
- York, Pennsylvania; United States
- Broadcast area: South Central Pennsylvania; Central Maryland
- Frequency: 103.3 MHz (HD Radio)
- Branding: Warm 103.3

Programming
- Language: English
- Format: Adult contemporary
- Affiliations: Compass Media Networks; Westwood One

Ownership
- Owner: Cumulus Media Inc.; (Radio License Holding SRC LLC)
- Sister stations: WIOV-FM; WSBA; WSOX

History
- First air date: September 1, 1962
- Former call signs: WSBA-FM (1962–1988)
- Call sign meaning: "Warm"

Technical information
- Licensing authority: FCC
- Facility ID: 73980
- Class: B
- ERP: 6,400 watts
- HAAT: 398 meters (1,306 ft)
- Transmitter coordinates: 40°1′38.3″N 76°35′58.8″W

Links
- Public license information: Public file; LMS
- Webcast: Listen live; Listen live (via Audacy); Listen live (via iHeartRadio)
- Website: www.warm1033.com

WARM-FM (103.3 FM) is a commercial radio station licensed to serve York, Pennsylvania. It is owned and operated by Cumulus Media through licensee Radio License Holding SRC LLC and airs an adult contemporary format. For much of November and December, it switches to Christmas music. Syndicated programming on WARM-FM includes The John Tesh Radio Show on weeknights, both the 1980s and 1990s versions of Backtrax USA on Saturday nights, and Your Weekend with Jim Brickman Sunday mornings.

WARM-FM's radio studios and offices are on Vartan Way in Harrisburg, Pennsylvania. The transmitter is off Brummer Lane in Hellam Township.

== History ==
=== Easy listening WSBA-FM ===
On September 1, 1962, the station first signed on as WSBA-FM. It was owned by the Susquehanna Radio Corporation, which also owned WSBA (910 AM) and WSBA-TV (Channel 43, now WPMT) in the York media market. Susquehanna, headquartered in York, eventually owned more than 40 stations in Pennsylvania and other parts of the country.

At first, WSBA-FM simulcast its AM counterpart. But a short time later, WSBA-FM switched to a beautiful music format of soft instrumentals with limited talking and commercials. The station remained easy listening for the next two decades, competing with WGAL-FM (101.3 FM), a station in nearby Lancaster. But by the 1980s, the easy listening format started to age. WSBA-FM added more vocals, and in the mid-1980s, switched to a soft adult contemporary sound.

=== Move to adult contemporary ===
In 1988, the WARM-FM call sign was moved to the station, having previously been used by a Susquehanna-owned station in Atlanta called "Warm 99", now WWWQ. (There is another station holding the WARM call letters at 590 AM in Scranton, also owned previously by Susquehanna). WARM-FM has always broadcast some type of adult contemporary (AC) music format from the time of its inception and was repeatedly ranked at the number one spot in the York radio market into the early 2000s, with significant listening also in the adjacent Lancaster and Harrisburg radio markets.

However, following the trends of other AC stations in the country, the station "freshened up" its playlist in the mid-2000s and discarded all but a handful of pre-1980 titles, focusing more heavily on current and recent pop hits. The station began leaning slightly in a hot AC direction, although still positioned as a mainstream AC, as it continued to play a considerable percentage of soft hits from the 1980s and 1990s.

In 2006, Susquehanna Radio's stations, including WARM-FM, were sold to Cumulus Media, one of the biggest owners of radio stations in the US.

=== Switch to Wink 103 ===
On September 8, 2011, WARM-FM officially changed its branding to "Wink 103". This was similar to co-owned WNNK-FM (104.1 FM), often the number one station in nearby Harrisburg, which has been known as "Wink 104" for many years. As Wink 103, WARM-FM straddled the line between AC and hot AC.

It dropped the Wink identification on December 26, 2012, returning to the "Warm 103.3" branding.

=== Christmas music ===
On November 23, 2012, WARM-FM began playing all Christmas music. On December 26, after the Christmas season, the station returned to its adult contemporary format. Each year it has followed the same pattern of going All-Christmas in early to mid-November and returning to its AC format on December 26, though in 2022, the station expanded the 24/7 Christmas format by four days, ending on December 30. While the FM station plays holiday tunes, the website also offers what it calls its "Scrooge Stream" playing the usual format.

== Signal note ==
WARM-FM is short-spaced to WPRB (licensed to serve Princeton, New Jersey) as they operate on the same channel and the distance between the two stations' transmitters is only 103 miles as determined by FCC rules. The minimum distance between two Class B stations operating on the same channel according to current FCC rules is 150 miles.
