= WRKY (AM) =

Radio station in Lancaster, Pennsylvania

- Lancaster, Pennsylvania; United States
- Broadcast area: Susquehanna Valley
- Frequency: 1490 kHz

Programming
- Format: Christian adult contemporary
- Network: Word FM

Ownership
- Owner: Four Rivers Community Broadcasting Corporation

History
- First air date: June 1922
- Former call signs: WGAL (1922–1977); WDDL (1977–1979); WLPA (1979–2021)
- Former frequencies: 1210 kHz (1927); 1190 kHz (1927–1928); 1310 kHz (1928–1934); 1500 kHz (1934–1941)
- Call sign meaning: "Rocky" (former branding)

Technical information
- Licensing authority: FCC
- Facility ID: 25870
- Class: C
- Power: 600 watts unlimited
- Transmitter coordinates: 40°3′38.4″N 76°18′57.9″W
- Translator: See § Translator

Links
- Public license information: Public file; LMS
- Website: wordfm.org

WRKY (1490 kHz) is a non-commercial educational station, licensed to Lancaster, Pennsylvania. The station is owned by Four Rivers Community Broadcasting Corporation. WRKY is one of Pennsylvania's oldest radio stations.

WRKY is powered at 600 watts, using a non-directional antenna. Its transmitter is off Fruitville Pike in Lancaster.

== History ==
The station was first licensed on June 24, 1922 to the Lancaster Electric Supply & Construction Company at 23 East Orange Street, and signed on that same month. It is one of Pennsylvania's earliest stations. The original call sign was WGAL, which was randomly assigned from a sequential roster of available call signs. The station was once housed in the historic Jasper Yeates House.

WGAL was owned by the Steinman family, which also owned two local newspapers, the Intelligencer Journal and the Lancaster New Era. In 1947 an FM sister station went on the air, WGAL-FM, now WROZ. In 1949, the family added Pennsylvania's first television station outside Philadelphia. The TV station is now owned by The Hearst Corporation and still has the WGAL call sign. For most of its history, WGAL/WLPA was a full service radio station, airing middle of the road music, news, talk and sports. It was a long-time affiliate of the NBC Radio Network.

In the early 1990s, WLPA simulcast the audio of CNN Headline News and WGAL's local newscasts, before switching to One-on-One Sports, then Sporting News Radio (both forerunners of SportsMap). It also broadcast Philadelphia Phillies games.

In July 2005, WLPA changed to a sports radio format, first affiliating with Fox Sports Radio. On August 1, 2013, WLPA became an affiliate of ESPN Radio. The station had attempted to affiliate with ESPN Radio for some years beforehand, but was unable to do so due to its geographic proximity to another ESPN affiliate, WGLD in Manchester Township. However, that station joined CBS Sports Radio in early 2013, making the ESPN affiliation available to WLPA.

On April 1, 2015, WLPA changed format from ESPN sports to adult standards, supplied by Westwood One's America's Best Music service, returning the station to the music it once played decades ago.

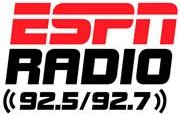
"ESPN92.5-92.7" logo

On April 4, 2016, WLPA reverted back to a sports radio format, with a simulcast of the ESPN Radio programming of sister station WONN-FM, now WPPY. WLPA adopted that station's ESPN Radio 92.7 branding at that time.

On July 23, 2021, it was announced that Forever Media would purchase WLPA and its translator along with WONN-FM for a total of $400,000. This signals Hall Communications' withdrawal from the market, as the sale of 101.3 WROZ to religious broadcaster Educational Media Foundation was announced earlier that month.

The sale consummated on October 15, 2021. WLPA and its translator subsequently switched to a simulcast of the classic rock programming of sister station WYCR. The station's call sign was changed to WRKY effective November 1, 2021.

In December 2024, it was announced that Four Rivers Community Broadcasting would purchase the translator W223CH Lancaster PA from Forever Media for $200,000. Two months later in March 2025, Four Rivers announced they would acquire WRKY from Forever for $15,000.

On July 2, 2025, the Federal Communications Commission granted its application to switch from a commercial to a noncommercial station.

== Translator ==
WRKY programming is broadcast on the following translator:

Broadcast translator for WRKY
Call sign	Frequency	City of license	FID	ERP (W)	HAAT	Class	Transmitter coordinates	FCC info
W223CH	92.5 FM	Lancaster, Pennsylvania	155427	250	57 m (187 ft)	D	40°02′18.3″N 76°18′21.8″W	LMS

== See also ==
- List of initial AM-band station grants in the United States
