= WKYJ (FM) =

Radio station in Starview, Pennsylvania

- Starview, Pennsylvania; United States
- Broadcast area: York–Harrisburg
- Frequency: 92.7 MHz

Programming
- Format: Contemporary Christian
- Network: K-Love

Ownership
- Owner: Educational Media Foundation; (K-LOVE, Inc.)
- Sister stations: WKHL, WROZ

History
- First air date: November 22, 1971
- Former call signs: WRHY (1971–1983); WHTF (1983–1996); WEGK (1996–2001); WHBO (2001–2004); WSJW (2004–2011); WKZF (2011–2014); WLPA-FM (2014–2015); WONN-FM (2015–2021); WNUU (2021–2022); WPPY (2023–2025)
- Call sign meaning: K-Love

Technical information
- Licensing authority: FCC
- Facility ID: 62368
- Class: A
- ERP: 700 watts
- HAAT: 291 meters (955 ft)
- Transmitter coordinates: 40°4′32.3″N 76°48′1.9″W

Links
- Public license information: Public file; LMS
- Website: www.klove.com

WKYJ (92.7 FM) is a non-commercial radio station licensed to Starview, Pennsylvania, United States (a neighborhood of Mount Wolf), and serving the York and Harrisburg radio markets. It broadcasts the K-Love network and is owned by the Educational Media Foundation, transmitting from a site near Copenhaffer Road in Conewago Township, York County.

== History ==
On June 23, 1971, the Federal Communications Commission (FCC) granted Capital Media, Inc., a construction permit for a new station on 92.7 MHz. It began broadcasting on November 22, 1971, as WRHY. Broadcasting what was called "musical programming for the adult", it had offices and studios in Starview as well as at the transmitter site.

Shortly after starting, WRHY debuted a nighttime progressive rock show. Progressive rock was the main format by 1974. On May 13, 1976, the FCC granted a voluntary assignment of the station's license from Capital Media, Inc., to Harrea Broadcasters, Inc. Harrea owned AM station WKBO in Harrisburg.

By 1980, the station's format had shifted to album-oriented rock. An automated nostalgia (oldies) format replaced the rock format in the early 1980s.

The station's license was voluntarily transferred from Harrea Broadcasters, Inc., to Starview Media, Inc., on July 27, 1983. On August 12, 1983, the station switched call signs to WHTF and began airing a contemporary hit radio format. Its format changed to contemporary hit radio/top 40 branded as 92 Rock. The format evolved toward classic rock over the next two years, and by the summer of 1985, the station's branding changed to Starview 92, then Starview 92.7.

On February 12, 1993, the station switched to an active rock format and re-branded as Solid Rock 92.7. With increasing consolidation in the radio industry and unable to buy another station pair, Starview Media opted to sell WHTF to Hall Communications, which owned an AM and FM outlet in Lancaster, in September 1995. When the sale closed in January 1996, the station relaunched as The Eagle with a classic rock format from Hall's studios in Mount Joy. It also adopted the new call sign WEGK.

In 2001, the station flipped to oldies as "Big 92.7 FM" and switched its call sign to WHBO. Hall made the decision based on the switch of existing oldies station WWKL (99.3 FM) to another format. Another format and call sign change took place on March 1, 2004, when it became smooth jazz station WSJW.

On July 29, 2011, the station abruptly dropped its smooth jazz format and began stunting, mainly with cover versions of Led Zeppelin's "Stairway to Heaven". The following message was displayed on the station's website:

The decision to end Smooth Jazz 92.7 was not an easy one to make. Many factors contributed to the change, including the fact that listenership never reached predicted levels and revenues coming in were not enough to support the station and keep it on the air. We thank you for being a loyal listener and for your support of the station. A new format will begin shortly.

On August 1, 2011, the station changed its call sign to WKZF, returning to classic rock, and re-branding as 92.7 WKZF, with the first song being "Stairway to Heaven" by Led Zeppelin. Rick Everett, former Hall Communications operations manager of Cat Country 98.1 WCTK in Providence, Rhode Island, was hired as a consultant for the transition. The syndicated The Free Beer and Hot Wings Show aired weekday mornings.

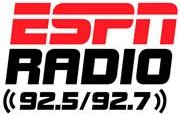
"ESPN92.5-92.7" logo

On September 1, 2014, WKZF changed its call sign to WLPA-FM, in anticipation of its format change to sports radio from ESPN Radio, which took place at midnight on September 3, 2014.

On December 2, 2015, the WLPA-FM call sign was changed to WONN-FM.

On July 23, 2021, it was announced that Forever Media would purchase WONN-FM, along with WLPA and its translator for a total of $400,000. This signals Hall Communications' withdrawal from the market, as the sale of 101.3 WROZ to religious broadcaster Educational Media Foundation was announced earlier that month.

The sale was consummated on October 15, 2021. WONN-FM simultaneously switched to a top 40 (CHR) format. The station’s call sign changed to WNUU on November 1, 2021.

On November 1, 2022, WNUU dropped its top 40 (CHR) format and began stunting with Christmas music, branded as "Santa 92.7", with a new format to launch in January.

"Happy 92.7" logo

The station applied to change its callsign to WPPY, effective January 1, 2023. On that date, WPPY launched an adult contemporary format branded as "Happy 92.7". The station again began playing Christmas music under the "Santa 92.7" name on November 1, 2023, and again on November 1, 2024.

K-Love Inc. (the Educational Media Foundation) acquired WPPY and WGET in Gettysburg from Forever Media in a deal filed in April 2025. In September 2025, WPPY flipped to K-Love and changed its call sign to the current WKYJ.
