= WLAN (AM) =

- Lancaster, Pennsylvania; United States
- Frequency: 1390 kHz
- Branding: Rumba 100.5

Programming
- Format: Defunct (was Spanish tropical)
- Affiliations: Premiere Networks

Ownership
- Owner: iHeartMedia, Inc.; (iHM Licenses, LLC)
- Sister stations: WHKF; WHP; WLAN-FM; WRBT; WRVV; WTKT

History
- First air date: August 9, 1946
- Last air date: May 27, 2025
- Call sign meaning: Lancaster

Technical information
- Licensing authority: FCC
- Facility ID: 52260
- Class: D
- Power: 1,100 watts (day); 18 watts (night)
- Transmitter coordinates: 40°3′38.35″N 76°18′57.85″W

Links
- Public license information: Public file; LMS
- Webcast: Listen live (via iHeartRadio)
- Website: rumbalancaster.iheart.com

WLAN (1390 kHz, "Rumba 100.5") was a commercial AM radio station licensed to serve Lancaster, Pennsylvania. The station was owned by iHeartMedia, Inc. through licensee iHM Licenses, LLC, and aired a Spanish tropical music format.

== History ==
WLAN signed on for the first time on August 9, 1946. The station was originally owned by The Peoples Broadcasting Company, operated by the Altdoerffer family of Lancaster County, Pennsylvania. In January 1948, the Federal Communications Commission (FCC) authorized WLAN to change from 1,000 watts (daytime only) to 1,000 watts (full-time), concurrent with a change in frequency from 1320 kHz to 1390 kHz. In 1949, a companion FM station was added, WLAN-FM. In the 1960s and 1970s, WLAN offered a Top 40 format and was an affiliate of the ABC Contemporary Network. As Top 40 music listening switched to FM, WLAN became an adult contemporary music station, and by the early 2000s it switched to adult standards.

On January 4, 2010, WLAN changed its format from standards to classic hits. Then, on February 7, 2012, the station switched to a conservative talk radio format, simulcast from co-owned WHP in Harrisburg, Pennsylvania. Programming included Glenn Beck, Rush Limbaugh, and other nationally syndicated conservative talk hosts, along with WHP's RJ Harris and Bob Durgin.

On January 7, 2010, WLAN informed the FCC that it was about to lose its long-time transmitter site. Franklin & Marshall College, which owned the site, decided not to renew the lease. WLAN chose to apply to move its transmitter to the WLPA transmitter site and diplex its signal into WLPA's non-directional antenna. The change from a directional antenna array at the former site to a non-directional antenna resulted in WLAN having to reduce power from 5,000 watts day and 1,000 watts night to 1,100 watts day and 18 watts night, with a corresponding downgrade from Class B to Class D. The FCC granted WLAN a new license with the updated facilities on August 23, 2010.

On May 4, 2015, the station changed format to Spanish tropical music and changed branding to "Rumba 1390". The station catered to the Lancaster Hispanic community and was fully automated, with announcers located in other cities and using pre-recorded voice tracks with no live on-air personalities.

In May 2017, WLAN began simulcasting on FM translator W226CC in Lancaster. The station's branding was changed to "Rumba 93.1". On September 15, 2017, the FCC received an interference complaint from the owner of WLEB-LP, alleging interference being caused to at least 56 WLEB-LP listeners by W226CC operations. The complaint contained written declarations from 56 WLEB-LP listeners, documenting where the interference was occurring now that W266CC was on the air. As a result, the FCC required the translator to move to 100.5, with a corresponding change in call sign to W263DB effective October 24, 2017. WLAN subsequently rebranded as "Rumba 100.5".

WLAN left the air on May 27, 2025, after losing its tower site lease. The "Rumba 100.5" programming moved to the third HD Radio channel of WRFY-FM in Reading to continue to feed W263DB. The FCC cancelled the station's license on March 19, 2026, after iHeartMedia surrendered it.
