= WWKL (disambiguation) =

WWKL may refer to:

- WWKL, a radio station (93.1 FM) licensed to serve Wildwood Crest, New Jersey, United States, which currently holds the call sign
- WCDM, a radio station (106.7 FM) licensed to serve Hershey, Pennsylvania, United States, which held the call sign WWKL from 2018 to 2026
- WTPA-FM, a radio station (93.5 FM) licensed to serve Mechanicsburg, Pennsylvania, which held the call sign WWKL from 2011 to 2018
- WKHL (FM), a radio station (92.1 FM) licensed to serve Palmyra, Pennsylvania, which held the call sign WWKL from 2001 to 2011
- WTKT, a radio station (1460 AM) licensed to serve Harrisburg, Pennsylvania, which held the call sign WWKL from 1998 to 2001
- WHKF, a radio station (99.3 FM) licensed to serve Harrisburg, Pennsylvania, which held the call sign WWKL from 1995 to 1998 and WWKL-FM from 1998 to 2001
- WRBT, a radio station (94.9 FM) licensed to serve Harrisburg, Pennsylvania, which held the call sign WWKL from 1989 to 1995 and WWKL-FM in 1995
