= Ken Matthews (radio) =

American radio show host

- Born: New Jersey, U.S.
- Education: North Carolina State University
- Presenting career
- Show: The Ken Matthews Show
- Country: United States
- Website: kenmatthewsmedia.com

Ken Matthews is an American talk radio show host, professional speaker, and event host. He had been hosting a national show syndicated by Talk Media Network until his show was terminated for cause in July 2022. His flagship station was WHP (AM) in Harrisburg, Pennsylvania. He was a regular rotating host for The Rush Limbaugh Show, and hosted the last two episodes of the program, after Limbaugh's passing. Matthews has repeatedly been named one of the 100 most important talk radio show hosts in America, the "Heavy Hundred", by TALKERS Magazine.

== Biography ==
=== Early years ===
Matthews was born in New Jersey in 1966, and grew up in Florida. He attended North Carolina State University in Raleigh, North Carolina and studied political science.

=== Career ===
During orientation at NC State in August 1980, Matthews visited the campus radio station, WKNC-FM. Within a month, he was hosting an overnight show "spinning classical hits from Bach to Debussy". He then did a jazz show followed by a rock in the morning. He planned to do pre-law and then attend University of North Carolina Law School, but he didn't finish his undergraduate studies, he would joke, as he “was doing too much broadcasting.”

Matthews did morning contemporary hit radio format in Portland, Maine, oldies format in Cincinnati, and CHR again in Charleston, South Carolina. His "most successful run" was decade and a half at WAEB B104 in Allentown, Pennsylvania. After being asked to leave in 2006, he "explored other options", e.g., teaching, speaking, real estate, marketing, and television while getting active on Facebook and Twitter. This led to his first talk show host position when the programming director from New Jersey 101.5 (WKXW) contacted him with the idea of doing a show based on his Facebook content. He was first asked to fill in for Bob Durgin, who had hosted his own show for 24 years at WHP-AM 580 in Harrisburg, in 2011-2012 — then hired as his full-time replacement in 2013. He considers this his greatest achievement in radio, a thrilling assignment, considering Durgin was "a market legend". "It's a heritage station with a great team, and it's what I enjoy doing."

"We need more great conversation in public," Matthews says about his show. "I like to talk about issues that sometimes make people uncomfortable, but there's a way to talk about any issue that will get people engaged in the conversation and okay with it." Jeff Hurley, Regional Program Manager at Clear Channel Media and Entertainment Harrisburg, considers Matthews "the perfect host to drive political discussion in Central Pennsylvania. He brings energy and excitement that’s infectious to everyone around him."

Matthews radio career "comeback" was profiled by local TV station '69 News' WFMZ in early 2019. He appeared as a guest on Tucker Carlson's FoxNews TV program just prior to the general election in 2020, where they discussed numerous extremist right-wing conspiracies, such as Pizzagate and replacement theory. Matthews was presented with a commemorative Russian flag, which he considered, "one of the greatest honors of my life".

Matthews considers Glenn Beck, whose "approach to marketing, business, and media" he admires, a major influence.

=== National syndication ===
Ken Matthews began nationally syndicating The Ken Matthews Show on December 16, 2021, with Talk Media Network as syndicator. On that date, his show moved three hours earlier to 12 p.m. to 3 p.m. ET, weekdays. His show was intended to be “a place where you can come to openly examine what is really going on in our country. We have everyday conversations about pop culture, people, and politics, without censorship and trendy wokeness."

WHP 580 in Harrisburg, Pennsylvania was the flagship affiliate of The Ken Matthews Show and aired the program on delay, 3 p.m. to 6 p.m. ET. Matthews gave a preview of his syndication focus in a video interview with Radio Ink.

In Feb. 2022, a radio news website published an article tracking the growth of the syndicated program. FoxNews published coverage of Ken Matthews' commentary from his radio show on April 19, 2022.

On July 16, 2022, Matthews posted that he had been terminated by his network syndicator, after "profane" comments he was exchanging with his production engineer ended up live on-air. By way of explanation (and apology), Matthews said:

... during my show you may have heard profanity and vulgarity and conversations that were not meant to be on the air and I want to apologize for that ... I was unaware that most of everything I was discussing with my engineer off the air was being broadcast on the air.

Matthews had been reading “some of Hunter Biden's texts about his mother and other family members in what I thought was a secure communication between my engineer and myself during what I presumed was a commercial break." In a follow-up post he alluded that he may begin performing a program via the social media video platform Rumble. On July 26, 2022 Matthews said, "I am un-syndicated which means I am not on regular radio anymore, so this is the first time officially in four decades that I haven’t been broadcasting."

== Stations ==
- WRFR: Franklin, NC (1981)
- WRAL/WKNC: Raleigh, NC (1983–85)
- WERI: Providence, RI (1985–87)
- WTIC-FM: Hartford, CT (1987)
- WZOU: Boston, MA (1987)
- WWGT: Portland, ME (1987–89)
- WSSX: Charleston, SC (1989)
- WGRR: Cincinnati, OH (1990)
- WAEB-FM: Allentown, PA (1991–2006)
- WKXW: Trenton, NJ (2009–10) fill-in
- WLAN-AM: Lancaster, PA
- WAEB-AM: Allentown, PA weekends
- WPHT: Philadelphia, PA (2013–2021) weekends & fill-in
- WHP: Harrisburg, PA (2013–2022)

== Personal ==
Matthews lives with his wife of 30 years and two teenage sons in the Lehigh Valley, Pennsylvania. He is a lifetime member of the National Rifle Association of America, a pistol instructor, and a former volunteer firefighter. As a rotating host on The Rush Limbaugh Show on March 5, 2021, he mentioned that he is of Hungarian and Polish descent.
