= WLAN (disambiguation) =

Wireless LAN is a computer network that links devices using wireless communication within a limited area.

WLAN may also refer to:

- WLAN-Hotspot, also known as a wireless hotspot
- WLAN (AM), a radio station in Lancaster, Pennsylvania
- WLAN-FM, a radio station in Lancaster, Pennsylvania
