= WBYN =

WBYN may refer to:

- WBYN-FM, a radio station (107.5 FM) licensed to serve Boyertown, Pennsylvania, United States
- WBYN (AM), a defunct radio station (1160 AM) formerly licensed to serve Lehighton, Pennsylvania
- WNSW, a radio station (1430 AM) licensed to serve Newark, New Jersey, United States, which held the WBYN call sign from 1941 until 1947
