= WEEU =

Talk radio station in Reading, Pennsylvania

- Reading, Pennsylvania; United States
- Broadcast area: South Central Pennsylvania
- Frequency: 830 kHz
- Branding: 830 AM WEEU

Programming
- Format: Talk radio
- Network: Townhall News
- Affiliations: Compass Media Networks; Westwood One; Philadelphia Phillies Radio Network; Philadelphia Eagles Radio Network

Ownership
- Owner: John and Kristine Treese; (Treese Media Group LLC)

History
- First air date: January 4, 1932

Technical information
- Licensing authority: FCC
- Facility ID: 70508
- Class: B
- Power: 20,000 watts (day); 6,000 watts (night)
- Transmitter coordinates: 40°30′54.33″N 76°07′22.8″W

Links
- Public license information: Public file; LMS
- Webcast: Listen live
- Website: www.830weeu.com

WEEU (830 kHz) is a commercial AM radio station in Reading, Pennsylvania. It has a talk format and is owned by The Treese Media Group, LLC, led by John and Kristine Treese. The studios and offices are on North Fourth Street.

WEEU is powered at 20,000 watts by day. Because 830 AM is a clear channel frequency reserved for Class A station WCCO in Minneapolis, WEEU must reduce power to 6,000 watts at night to avoid interference. It uses a six-tower array to create different directional signal patterns for daytime and nighttime. During the day, WEEU's signal is aimed toward the northwest and the southeast from its transmitter in Shartlesville, near Interstate 78. At night, WEEU's signal is directed toward the southeast, away from Minneapolis.

On November 4, 2026, WEEU officially started broadcasting on 99.7 FM, adding a new FM translator and antenna to its lineup as another way to reach local listeners. The FM station will carry the same programming as the AM, but offers a clearer sound. The station also launched a new website around the same time.

== History ==
=== Early years ===
On January 4, 1932, WEEU signed on the air. It originally broadcast on 830 kHz as a daytime-only station with 1,000 watts of power. It was owned by Berks Broadcasting with studios at 533 Penn Street.

In 1941, WEEU's frequency was changed to 850 kHz as a result of North American Regional Broadcasting Agreement (NARBA). In 1949, WEEU was granted fulltime authorization by the Federal Communications Commission (FCC) by adding a directional nighttime signal. In 1999, WEEU moved back to 830 kHz with a more powerful signal. It was powered at 5,000 watts in the daytime and 6,000 watts at night. It used a new five-tower array, just north of Interstate 78 in Shartlesville. In the early 2000s, WEEU added a sixth tower to its array. That allowed it to upgrade its daytime signal to 20,000 watts. 50,000 watts is the maximum for AM stations in the U.S. WEEU kept its 6,000 watt nighttime power.

Starting in the 1940s, WEEU was an ABC Radio Network affiliate. It switched to Townhall Radio News in the 2020s.

=== Reading Eagle Bankruptcy ===
WEEU had been co-owned with the Reading Eagle daily newspaper. As a result of the bankruptcy of the Reading Eagle Company and the May 2019 sale of most its assets to MediaNews Group, WEEU was put up for sale. There were tentative plans to shut the station down at the completion of the sale of the newspaper, which was to take place before July 31, 2019. Any potential buyer would be allowed to use the station's transmission facilities for up to five years, if not sold by MediaNews Group beforehand.

Former logo

In June 2019, Twilight Broadcasting agreed to purchase WEEU, allowing the station to remain on the air with most of its existing programming. However, another Reading station, 1340 WRAW owned by iHeartMedia, claimed programming from iHeart's Premiere Networks as the bankruptcy took effect. That meant the popular syndicated talk program, The Rush Limbaugh Show moved from 830 to 1340 AM.

A local marketing agreement (LMA) began on July 1, upon the completion of MediaNews Group's acquisition of The Reading Eagle. The purchase was consummated on September 12, at a price of $88,500. WEEU programming was simulcast on co-owned 1160 WBYN in Lehighton until 2021.

=== Change in ownership ===
The station was sold again to Treese Media Group LLC, led by John Treese and his wife Kristine in November 2023. Treese had been a DJ for WNPV, WQKX and WVLY-FM before becoming an owner. The sale closed on February 2, 2024.

== Programming ==
WEEU has two local talk shows on weekdays: Mornings with Mike is hosted by Mike Keller and Bob McCool in drive time. Feedback with Bill Saunders is heard in late mornings.

WEEU is part of the Philadelphia Eagles Radio Network broadcasting Eagles football games, and the Philadelphia Phillies Radio Network, broadcasting Phillies baseball games. Penn State Nittany Lions football and basketball also air on WEEU.

The station broadcasts high school football and basketball games from area schools. Shows focusing on local teams include A Slice of Sports and The Scoreboard Show hosted by Jeff Nolan.
