= WHP-TV =

Television station in Harrisburg, Pennsylvania

- Harrisburg–Lancaster–; Lebanon–York, Pennsylvania; United States
- City: Harrisburg, Pennsylvania
- Channels: Digital: 32 (UHF), shared with WXBU; Virtual: 21
- Branding: CBS 21; myTV Central PA (21.2); Central PA CW (21.3)

Programming
- Affiliations: 21.1: CBS; 21.2: Independent with MyNetworkTV; 21.3: The CW; for others, see § Subchannels

Ownership
- Owner: Sinclair Broadcast Group; (Harrisburg Licensee, LLC)
- Sister stations: WXBU

History
- First air date: July 4, 1953
- Former channel numbers: Analog: 55 (UHF, 1953–1961), 21 (UHF, 1961–2009); Digital: 4 (VHF, 2003–2009), 21 (UHF, 2009–2019)
- Former affiliations: DuMont (1953–1956)
- Call sign meaning: Harrisburg, Pennsylvania (Derived from former radio sister WHP (AM))

Technical information
- Licensing authority: FCC
- Facility ID: 72313
- ERP: 1,000 kW
- HAAT: 369 m (1,211 ft)
- Transmitter coordinates: 40°20′43.1″N 76°52′8.3″W

Links
- Public license information: Public file; LMS
- Website: local21news.com; cwcentralpa.com (21.3)

WHP-TV (channel 21) is a television station licensed to Harrisburg, Pennsylvania, United States, serving the Susquehanna Valley region as an affiliate of CBS, MyNetworkTV, and The CW. It is owned by Sinclair Broadcast Group alongside Lancaster-licensed Univision affiliate WXBU (channel 15). The two stations share studios on North 6th Street in the Uptown section of Harrisburg, with the building bisected by the city line for Harrisburg and Susquehanna Township. Through a channel sharing agreement, the stations transmit using WHP-TV's spectrum from an antenna on a ridge north of Linglestown Road in Middle Paxton Township. (It is co-located with WITF-TV and is distinguishable as the unlit red and white tower; WITF's tower is unpainted and flashes strobes at all times.)

== History ==
WHP-TV first signed on the air on July 4, 1953. It was owned by Commonwealth Communications, alongside WHP radio (580 AM and 97.3 FM, now WRVV). The station originally operated from studios located on Locust Street in Harrisburg. It has always been a primary CBS affiliate, though it also carried programming from the DuMont Television Network. The station lost DuMont when that network folded in 1956.

WHP-TV moved from channel 55 to UHF channel 21 on July 1, 1961. In 1963, the Federal Communications Commission (FCC) collapsed south central Pennsylvania, previously split between the Harrisburg–York and Lancaster markets, into a single market. Soon afterward, WHP-TV began to share CBS programming with WLYH-TV (channel 15, now WXBU) in Lebanon and WSBA-TV (channel 43) in York as part of the Keystone Network. This arrangement was necessary in the days before cable television, since the newly created market was not only one of the largest east of the Mississippi, but was very mountainous. UHF signals have never traveled very far across large areas or in rugged terrain. Between them, the three stations had about 55 percent signal overlap. WHP-TV began airing separate local programming during off-network hours, while WLYH and WSBA-TV simulcast for virtually the entire broadcast day (though they aired separate newscasts). WLYH and WSBA-TV ran about three-quarters of the CBS schedule, compared to separately programmed and owned WHP. All three stations preempted moderate amounts of CBS programming, but any shows preempted by WLYH and WSBA-TV ran on WHP while shows preempted by WHP would run on WLYH and WSBA-TV. This allowed the market to view the entire CBS schedule in one form or another. In 1975, the station relocated from its original studio facility on Locust Street to its current location on North 6th Street.

In 1983, Susquehanna Radio Corporation sold WSBA-TV to Mohawk Broadcasting, who broke channel 43 off from the Keystone Network and relaunched it as independent station WPMT (now a Fox affiliate). WHP-TV and WLYH continued as CBS affiliates, now with approximately 75 percent signal overlap. Both stations maintained their longstanding arrangement in which one station ran whatever CBS shows the other declined to air, though they continued to duplicate most network shows, and continued to have separate newscasts and syndicated programs.

The unusual situation of one market having two separately-owned and programmed CBS affiliates airing most of the same network programming existed because South Central Pennsylvania was just barely large enough to support what would have essentially been two independent stations (WPMT, like most early Fox stations, was still mostly programmed as an independent). WLYH's owner, Gateway Communications, feared for WLYH's viability as an independent, and was reluctant to spend money on an additional 18 hours of programming. In the fall of 1995, Commonwealth sold channel 21 to Clear Channel Communications (now iHeartMedia), which subsequently entered into a local marketing agreement (LMA) with Gateway. WLYH and WHP-TV merged their operations under this agreement, with WHP-TV as the senior partner. On December 16, 1995, WHP-TV became the sole CBS affiliate for South Central Pennsylvania with WLYH converting into a UPN affiliate.

=== Newport Television and Sinclair ownership ===
On April 20, 2007, Clear Channel entered into an agreement to sell its entire television station group to Providence Equity Partners' Newport Television. On July 19, 2012, Newport Television sold WHP-TV and five other stations to the Sinclair Broadcast Group as part of a group deal to sell 22 of its 27 stations to Sinclair, Nexstar Broadcasting Group and Cox Media Group. The LMA with WLYH-TV was included in the Newport–Sinclair deal despite Nexstar owning the license to the latter station. The group deal with Sinclair was completed on December 3, 2012. WHP-TV thus became the first Sinclair-owned station, and one of a handful in the United States, to use a historic three-letter call sign.

On July 29, 2013, Allbritton Communications announced that it would sell its seven television stations, including WHTM-TV, to Sinclair. As part of the deal, Sinclair was planning to sell the license assets of WHP-TV to Deerfield Media, but would continue to operate the station through shared services and joint sales agreements. This is due to FCC duopoly regulations that not only disallow common ownership of two of the four highest-rated stations in a single market, but also require a market to be left with eight unique owners after a duopoly is formed. In this case, the Harrisburg–Lancaster–York market, despite being the 43rd-largest market at the time the purchase was announced, has only six full-power stations, which are too few to permit a legal duopoly. In addition, WHTM and WHP are respectively the second and third highest-rated stations in the market.

On December 6, 2013, the FCC informed Sinclair that applications related to the deal need to be "amended or withdrawn", as the time brokerage agreement between WHP-TV and WLYH-TV would remain with Sinclair; this would, in effect, create a new time brokerage agreement between WHTM and WLYH, even though the FCC had ruled in 1999 that such agreements made after November 5, 1996, covering more than 15% of the broadcast day would count toward the ownership limits for the brokering station's owner. On March 20, 2014, as part of a restructuring of the Sinclair-Allbritton deal to address the noted ownership conflicts, Sinclair announced that it would terminate the sale of WHP-TV to Deerfield Media and instead sell the station to another third-party buyer, with whom Sinclair would not to enter into any operational or financial agreements and would assume the rights to the LMA with WLYH. Sinclair would also seek FCC consent for an asset swap with the buyer of WHP in which the station and WHTM would trade licenses, programming (including their respective network affiliations), virtual channel numbers and transmitter facilities. On May 29, 2014, Sinclair informed the FCC that it had not yet found a buyer for WHP and that it would also consider reselling WHTM to the third-party buyer, while keeping WHP and the LMA for WLYH; on June 23, the company announced that WHTM would be sold to Media General for $83.4 million.

=== Aborted sale to Standard Media Group ===
On May 8, 2017, Sinclair entered into an agreement to acquire Chicago-based Tribune Media—which has owned WPMT since 1996—for $3.9 billion, plus the assumption of $2.7 billion in debt held by Tribune. Sinclair was precluded from acquiring WPMT directly, as both it and WHP rank among the four highest-rated stations in the Harrisburg–Lancaster–Lebanon–York market in total day viewership, and there are too few independently owned full-power stations in the Susquehanna Valley area to permit legal duopolies in any event. On April 24, 2018, in an amendment to the Tribune acquisition through which it proposed the sale of certain stations to both independent and affiliated third-party companies to curry the DOJ's approval, Sinclair announced that it would sell WPMT and eight other stations—Sinclair-operated KOKH-TV in Oklahoma City, WRLH-TV in Richmond, WOLF-TV (along with LMA partners WSWB and WQMY) in Scranton–Wilkes-Barre, KDSM-TV in Des Moines and WXLV-TV in Greensboro–Winston-Salem–High Point, and Tribune-owned WXMI in Grand Rapids—to Standard Media Group (an independent broadcast holding company formed by private equity firm Standard General to assume ownership of and absolve ownership conflicts involving the aforementioned stations) for $441.1 million. The transaction includes a transitional services agreement, through which Sinclair would have continued operating WRLH for six months after the sale's completion.

Three weeks after the FCC's July 18 vote to have the deal reviewed by an administrative law judge amid "serious concerns" about Sinclair's forthrightness in its applications to sell certain conflict properties, on August 9, 2018, Tribune announced it would terminate the Sinclair deal, intending to seek other M&A opportunities. Tribune also filed a breach of contract lawsuit in the Delaware Chancery Court, alleging that Sinclair engaged in protracted negotiations with the FCC and the DOJ over regulatory issues, refused to sell stations in markets where it already had properties, and proposed divestitures to parties with ties to Sinclair executive chair David D. Smith that were rejected or highly subject to rejection to maintain control over stations it was required to sell. The termination of the Sinclair sale agreement places uncertainty for the future of Standard Media's purchases of WPMT and the other six Tribune- and Sinclair-operated stations included in that deal, which were predicated on the closure of the Sinclair–Tribune merger.

== News operation ==
WHP presently broadcasts 24 1/2 hours of locally produced newscasts each week (with 4 1/2 hours each weekday and one hour each on Saturdays and Sundays). In addition to its main studios, WHP operates a bureau in York. Unlike most CBS affiliates in the Eastern Time Zone, the station did not air a midday newscast on weekdays until September 2019 when it debuted a noon newscast before The Young and the Restless. It is also the only station in the market that does not have a 4:30 a.m. newscast. The morning newscast instead starts at 5 a.m. The station also provides weather forecasts for local radio stations WSOX (96.1), WLAN-FM (96.9), and WQLV (98.9 FM).

WHP has long been one of CBS's weakest affiliates. It has remained in third place for many years and sometimes even slid to fourth. The staff has earned numerous awards, including an Emmy Award in 2010 among other recognitions for its news team. WLYH's news department was shut down after being taken over by WHP, which began producing a prime time newscast at 10 p.m. for WLYH in September 1996; it was canceled in September 2003 due to low ratings. WHP revived that newscast in January 2009, which competes with WPMT's longer-established 10 p.m. newscast.

News broadcasts on WHP remained mainly in pillarboxed 4:3 standard definition until April 14, 2012, when WHP-TV became the fourth (and last) television station in the Central Pennsylvania market to begin broadcasting its local newscasts in high definition and the third to broadcast both in-studio segments and field reports in the format. With the conversion, the station debuted a new HD news set, digital microwave and editing equipment, and HD weather graphics system.

=== Notable former on-air staff ===
- Robb Hanrahan – anchor, also Face the State host

== Technical information ==
=== Subchannels ===
Subchannels of WHP-TV and WXBU
License	Subchannel	Res.	Short name	Programming
WHP-TV	21.1	1080i	CBS	CBS
WHP-TV	21.2	480i	MyTV	Independent with MyNetworkTV
WHP-TV	21.3	720p	CW	The CW
WHP-TV	21.4	480i	Charge!	Charge!
WXBU	15.1	480i	Univis	Univision

On February 22, 2006, News Corporation announced the launch of a new network called MyNetworkTV. On July 12, WHP announced that it would launch a new second digital subchannel to serve as the area's MyNetworkTV affiliate when that network launched on September 5. The subchannel became available on Comcast's digital tier while Philadelphia's WPHL-TV (which had been serving as the area's de facto WB affiliate) remained on the basic tier after becoming a MyNetworkTV affiliate. WLYH, meanwhile, joined another new network, The CW, when it debuted on September 18. On February 1, 2016, the simulcast of "The CW Central PA" moved to WHP 21.3.

=== Analog-to-digital conversion ===
WHP-TV ended regular programming on its analog signal, over UHF channel 21, on June 12, 2009, as part of the federally mandated transition from analog to digital television. The station's digital signal relocated from its pre-transition VHF channel 4 to UHF channel 21 for post-transition operations.

As a part of the repacking process following the 2016–2017 FCC incentive auction, WHP-TV relocated to channel 32 on August 1, 2019, using virtual channel 21.

== See also ==
- List of three-letter broadcast call signs in the United States
