= WFKB =

WFKB may refer to:

- WBYN-FM, a radio station (107.5 FM) licensed to serve Boyertown, Pennsylvania, United States, which held the call sign WFKB from 2006 to 2009
- WPWT, a radio station (870 AM) licensed to serve Colonial Heights, Tennessee, United States, which held the call sign WFKB from 1991 to 1992
