= WBYN (AM) =

Simulcast WEEU, Reading
- Lehighton, Pennsylvania; United States
- Broadcast area: Lehigh Valley
- Frequency: 1160 kHz
- Branding: 1160 WBYN

Programming
- Format: Talk
- Affiliations: ABC News Radio; Philadelphia Phillies; Philadelphia 76ers

Ownership
- Owner: Connoisseur Media; (Connoisseur Media Licenses, LLC)
- Sister stations: WEEU

History
- First air date: 1962 (as WYNS)
- Last air date: October 12, 2021
- Former call signs: WYNS (1962–2005)
- Call sign meaning: derived from WBYN-FM in Boyertown, whose religious format was moved to this station during the late 2000s

Technical information
- Facility ID: 69688
- Class: B
- Power: 4,000 watts day; 1,000 watts (night)

WBYN (1160 AM) was a news/talk radio station licensed to serve Lehighton, Pennsylvania. The station was owned by Connoisseur Media through licensee Connoisseur Media Licenses, LLC. At the time of its closure, it was a simulcast of WEEU in Reading, Pennsylvania, which was owned by Twilight Broadcasting. The station carried a mix of locally produced and syndicated programming, with specialty music shows on weekends, plus live sports including the Philadelphia Phillies and 76ers.

== History ==
The station was signed-on in 1962 by Martin Phillip under the call letters WYNS (pronounced wins) on 1150 kHz.

Phillip sold the station to Ragan Henry in 2000. Following financial losses, Henry took WYNS off-the-air on December 31, 2002; in 2003, he sold WYNS to Nassau Broadcasting Partners. Following the sale, the station, which had been an oldies station, began carrying sports radio programming from ESPN Radio, simulcast from sister station WEEX in Easton. (WYNS had abandoned the oldies format in 1998 in favor of country music, but subsequently reversed that change.)

In 2005, Christian radio station WBYN-FM was leased via a local marketing agreement (LMA) to Nassau, with plans to eventually purchase that station. WYNS's call letters were changed to WBYN on September 25, 2005, when the station started simulcasting WBYN-FM. The simulcast continued until the winter of 2006 when the FM station changed formats to an adult rock hits format called Frank FM and call sign to WFKB. WBYN's religious format remained on AM 1160 and on WFKB's second HD Radio channel. Nassau continued to manage WFKB with plans to acquire it. After being unable to negotiate a purchase of WFKB or extend the LMA, WDAC Radio took back operations of WFKB on March 15, 2009. On March 31, 2009, WFKB dropped the adult rock hits format, reverted to a religious format, and reverted to WBYN-FM calls.

The religious format on WBYN-FM, while similar to WBYN AM, was different programming. WBYN-FM focused more on national features, played more music, while WBYN AM focused more on talk and teaching, with some shows coming from Salem Media.

WBYN, along with nine other Nassau stations in New Jersey and Pennsylvania, was purchased at bankruptcy auction by NB Broadcasting in May 2012. NB Broadcasting was controlled by Nassau's creditors — Goldman Sachs, Pluss Enterprises, and P.E. Capital. In November, NB Broadcasting filed a motion to assign its rights to the stations to Connoisseur Media. The sale to Connoisseur Media, at a price of $38.7 million, was consummated on May 29, 2013.

On January 4, 2016, WBYN changed formats back to a simulcast of WEEX. WBYN was for a time inactive, after having reported to the FCC through its licenseholder's attorney the theft of copper radials and ground system of the station's transmitter as of March 4, 2018. In June 2019, the station returned to the air. In August 2019, WBYN began a simulcast of WEEU in Reading, pending its acquisition by Twilight Broadcasting, which was announced in November 2019.

Due to issues related to the station's studio and transmitter site, the sale to Twilight Broadcasting was never consummated. Connoisseur Media surrendered WBYN's license to the Federal Communications Commission on October 12, 2021, who cancelled it the same day. As of June 2022 the transmitter site outside of Lehighton was dismantled.

== See also ==
- WEEU
