= WRAW =

Radio station in Reading, Pennsylvania

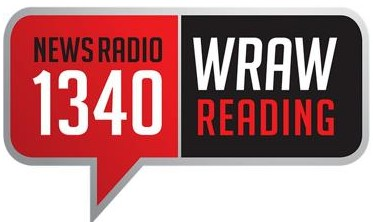

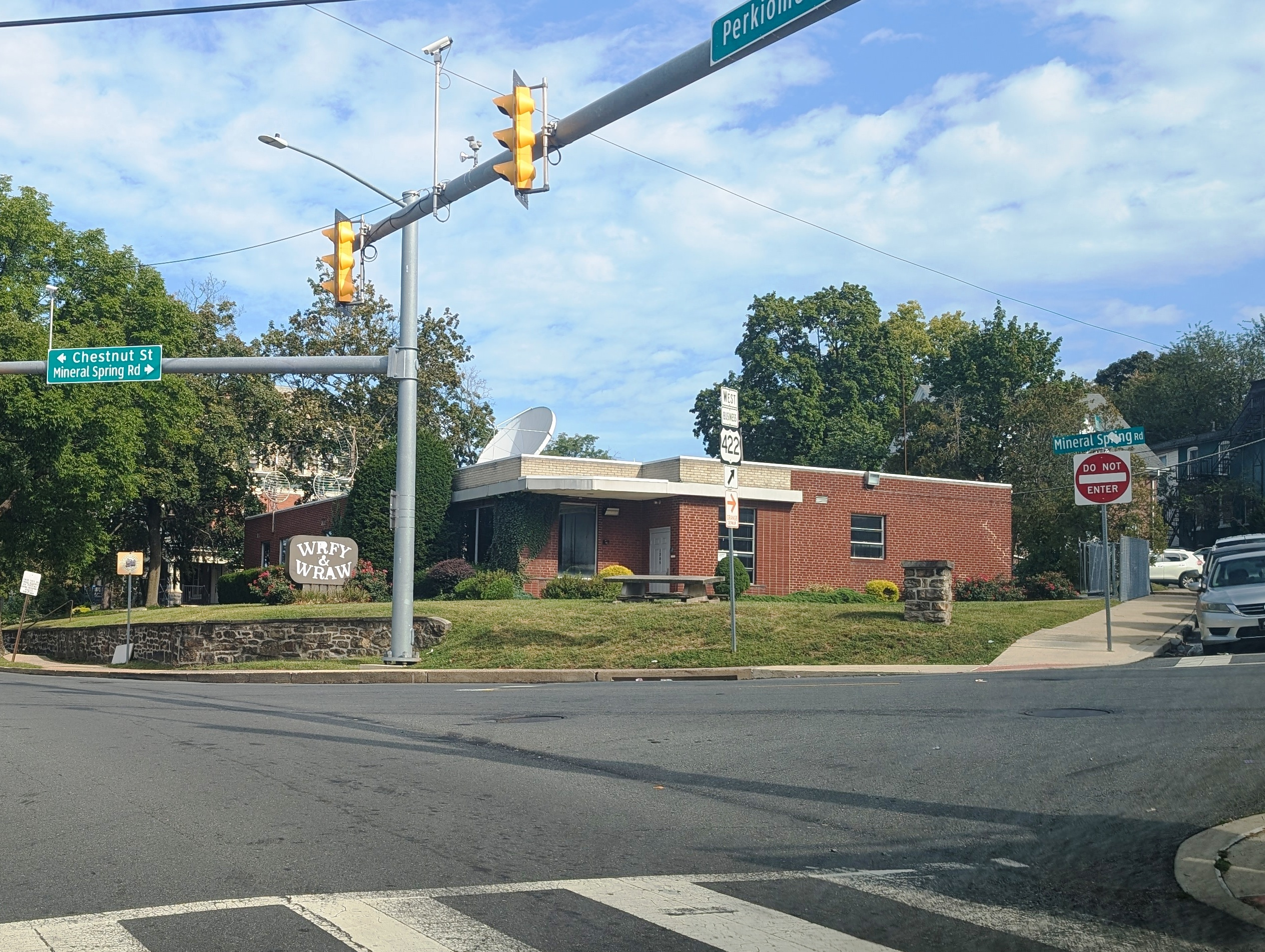
- Studios of WRFY-FM and WRAW in Reading
- Reading, Pennsylvania; United States
- Frequency: 1340 kHz
- Branding: NewsRadio 1340

Programming
- Format: Talk
- Network: Fox News Radio
- Affiliations: Premiere Networks

Ownership
- Owner: iHeartMedia; (iHM Licenses, LLC)
- Sister stations: WRFY-FM

History
- First air date: 1923
- Former call signs: WRAW (1923–2006); WKAP (2006–2007)

Technical information
- Licensing authority: FCC
- Facility ID: 69566
- Class: C
- Power: 1,000 watts unlimited
- Transmitter coordinates: 40°19′27.34″N 75°55′8.75″W

Links
- Public license information: Public file; LMS
- Webcast: Listen live (via iHeartRadio)
- Website: 1340wraw.iheart.com

WRAW (1340 kHz) is a commercial AM radio station licensed to Reading, Pennsylvania. The station is owned by iHeartMedia and calls itself "Newsradio 1340 WRAW." It broadcasts a conservative talk radio format.

WRAW's transmitter is off South 9th Street in Reading, near the Schuylkill River. It is powered at 1,000 watts. The service contour covers communities such as Ephrata, Pottstown, Kutztown, Boyertown and Hamburg.

== Programming ==
Weekdays begin with the R.J. Harris Breakfast Show simulcast from co-owned WHP in nearby Harrisburg, Pennsylvania. The rest of the weekday line up features mostly syndicated shows from the co-owned Premiere Networks: The Glenn Beck Radio Program, The Clay Travis and Buck Sexton Show, The Sean Hannity Show, The Jesse Kelly Show, The Michael Berry Show and Coast to Coast AM with George Noory.

On weekends, WRAW carries In the Garden with Ron Wilson, At Home with Gary Sullivan, Rich DeMuro on Tech, Bill Handel on the Law, The Weekend with Michael Brown, Armstrong & Getty and Sunday Night with Bill Cunningham. Most hours begin with an update from Fox News Radio.

== History ==
WRAW is one of the oldest radio stations in Pennsylvania. Although the station has reported that it signed on in September 1922, contemporary government records state that it was first licensed on June 14, 1923 to the "Avenue Radio Shop (Horace D. Good)" at 106 Schuyikill Avenue in Reading, for 10 watts on 1260 kHz. The call letters were randomly assigned from a sequential roster.

In November 1928, WRAW was assigned by the Federal Radio Commission's General Order 40 to 1310 kHz, sharing this frequency with Lancaster's WGAL. On August 5, 1930, Good transferred station ownership to the Reading Broadcasting Company. In 1934, WRAW was granted an unlimited assignment, after WGAL moved to 1500 kHz. In 1941, the implementation of the North American Regional Broadcasting Agreement moved the stations on 1310 kHz, including WRAW, to 1340 kHz.

In the 1960s and 1970s, the station had a Top 40 format. During the 1980s, it played a syndicated adult standards format, known as The Music of Your Life.

WRAW once broadcast in AM stereo using the C-QUAM system.

On February 27, 2014, WRAW changed to Spanish contemporary, branded as "Rumba 1340". Programming was also heard on FM translator W222BY on 92.3 FM. The simulcast ended on August 8, 2019, after the translator was sold to Educational Media Foundation (EMF).

On August 12, 2019, WRAW ended Spanish programming and began airing a conservative talk format branded as "NewsRadio 1340 WRAW". Another radio station in Reading, WEEU, discontinued airing Rush Limbaugh's nationally syndicated show in a cost-cutting measure stemming from its parent company's bankruptcy and sale. That prompted WRAW to pick up the broadcast, and carry other conservative talk programming, from co-owned Premiere Networks. After Limbaugh's death in 2021, WRAW, like other talk stations owned by iHeartMedia, switched to Limbaugh's replacement, The Clay Travis and Buck Sexton Show.
