= WKBO =

Contemporary Christian music radio station in Harrisburg, Pennsylvania, United States

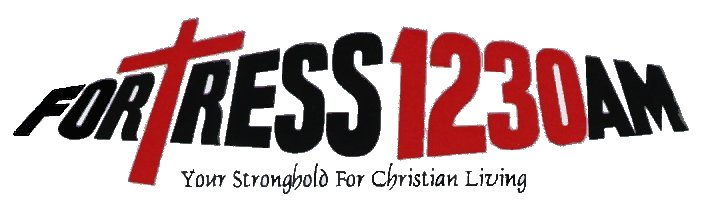

Harrisburg, Pennsylvania; United States
- Frequency: 1230 kHz
- Branding: Fortress 1230 AM

Programming
- Format: Christian contemporary

Ownership
- Owner: One Heart Ministries, Inc.

History
- First air date: October 12, 1925
- Former call signs: WPRC (1925–1929); WCOD (1929–1933)
- Former frequencies: 1390 kHz (1925-1927); 1430 kHz (1927-1928); 1200 kHz (1928-1929); 1430 kHz (1929-1941)
- Call sign meaning: Keystone Broadcasting Organization (owner in 1933)

Technical information
- Licensing authority: FCC
- Facility ID: 15323
- Class: C
- Power: 480 watts
- Transmitter coordinates: 40°16′52.32″N 76°52′4.9″W

Links
- Public license information: Public file; LMS
- Website: www.wkbo.net

WKBO (1230 kHz, "Fortress 1230 AM") is an AM radio station licensed to serve Harrisburg, Pennsylvania. The station is owned by One Heart Ministries, Inc. and broadcasts a Christian contemporary format. Studios are located at Stage and Studio Cafe in Mechanicsburg, Pennsylvania, and the station's tower is located at the Harrisburg Water plant.

== 1925 to 1929: WPRC ==
Although some accounts state that WKBO's origin dates back to as early as 1922, official government records date the station's establishment as taking place in 1925.

WKBO was first licensed, as WPRC, on September 23, 1925, to the Wilson Printing & Radio Co. at Fifth and Kelker Streets in Harrisburg, transmitting on 1390 kilohertz. It made its formal debut broadcast on October 12, 1925. WPRC was the fourth radio station to be licensed to Harrisburg, with WBAK (1922–1934), WABB (1923–1927), and WHBG (February 1925 to present, now WHP) leading the way. It was owned by W. Arthur Wilson of the Wilson Printing and Radio Company of Harrisburg. Wilson operated WPRC from his property at 1738 N 5th Street. (Some records indicate that it was 1740 N 5th Street.) The transmitter was located a few blocks away at Reel and Schuylkill Streets. WPRC offered a limited programming schedule of live performances by local musicians and "talks" by community leaders, which was typical in the very early days of radio.

Before putting WPRC on the air, the 38-year-old Wilson was the printer and editor of "Progress", a publication for railroad employees.

WPRC moved to 1430 kilohertz in 1927, then to 1200 kilohertz with the November 11, 1928 implementation of the Federal Radio Commission's General Order 40. (WHP and WBAK, the two other stations operating in Harrisburg in 1929, swapped frequencies with WPRC and shared time on 1430 kHz.) WKBO switched to 1230 kHz in 1941, as part of the North American Regional Broadcasting Agreement realignment of the AM band.

== 1929 to 1933: WCOD ==
Wilson sold WPRC to local coal dealer Norman R. Hoffman in 1929. Hoffman changed the call sign to WCOD and moved the studios and transmitter to the Governor Hotel at 4th and Market Streets in downtown Harrisburg. (The building remains part of the city landscape today.) Although Federal Radio Commission records show only Norman Hoffman as the station owner, newspaper articles indicate that Hoffman's father Benjamin was part owner of the station.

The Hoffmans sold WCOD to the Keystone Broadcasting Corporation in 1930. Keystone was originally the partnership of J.D. Pannell, J.S. Blankenhorn, and G.J. Plasey, all of the Harrisburg area.

In 1932, it was revealed that the Stackpole family, the owners of the Telegraph Press, Harrisburg Telegraph newspaper, and WHP, Inc. (WCOD's competitor), had purchased 75% of Keystone's stock. Telegraph Press treasurer Col. Edward J. Stackpole appeared before the Federal Radio Commission in Washington to answer allegations the Telegraph was involved in a radio monopoly in Harrisburg. The exact outcome of Stackpole's testimony is unclear since the Telegraph organization continued to hold its majority interests in both WHP and WCOD.

== 1933 to present: WKBO ==
WCOD was unveiled as WKBO on November 8, 1933, complete with brand new studios and a new transmitter site at the Penn-Harris Hotel on the corner of Third and Locust Streets. The on-air dedication was a black tie celebration worthy of a larger city with an evening of popular orchestral music from the Penn-Harris ballroom.

WKBO was managed by Clarence G. "Red" Moss from 1933 to 1947. Moss was a leading actor in a number of small theater productions in Harrisburg in his spare time. He was succeeded at WKBO by Dave Bennett in 1948. Bennett started as a sportscaster on WKBO before taking over as station manager, then he moved on to be the first general manager for WTPA-TV in the 1950s.

Some of WKBO's early program directors include Dick Redmond and Don Wear. Redmond, who was known for his long association with WHP in the 1940s and 1950's, was WKBO's program director in the mid 1930s. Don Wear became WKBO's programmer in 1948 and eventually moved on to program WTPA-TV for Dave Bennett in the 1950s.

WKBO's studios remained at the Penn-Harris Hotel until 1938, when they were moved a block away to 31 N. 2nd Street. The transmitter and antenna stayed on the roof until 1973. WKBO's antenna system was a shortened counterpoise radial system that only extended to the edge of the building's roof.

By 1939, the Stackpole family sold their interest in the Keystone Broadcasting Corporation to J.H. Steinman and John F. Steinman. The Steinmans, like the Stackpoles, were newspaper publishers and radio station owners. The Steinman family owned Lancaster Newspapers, Inc. and the Mason-Dixon Radio Group. Mason-Dixon owned WGAL in Lancaster, WORK in York, WEST in Easton, and WAZL in Hazleton (all in Pennsylvania), along with several stations in Delaware. The group was managed by Clair McCollough, who later served as WGAL-TV's first general manager. (McCollough was a recognized industry leader who chaired several boards for the National Association of Broadcasters and formed the Pennsylvania Association of Broadcasters.)

WKBO became an NBC affiliate in 1939. and also joined the Mutual Broadcasting System in 1940.

Some of WKBO's earlier "Hall of Famers" include Mike Ross, Pete Wambach, Olin Harris and Joe "Anthony" McGranaghan.

- Mike Ross, born Michael Rosenberger (1923–2006), was a well-known and highly respected reporter and anchor for WTPA / WHTM television for many years. Later in his career, Ross was reporter emeritus at the state capital. Ross began his long broadcasting career as a staff announcer for WKBO in 1948. He was also a gifted singer who toured with a production of "Guys and Dolls" in the 1950s.
- Pete Wambach (1916–2007) was recognized throughout Pennsylvania for his "This is Pennsylvania" radio series. This feature aired on stations throughout the state from the 1960s to the 1980s and highlighted numerous people and places of interest in the commonwealth. Wambach appeared on WCMB in Harrisburg (now WTKT) for three decades (including hosting a show on the short-lived WCMB-TV in the 1950s). He started as a staff announcer on WKBO in 1948 along with Mike Ross.
- Olin Harris (1934–2009) created the show "Echoes of Glory" on WKBO in 1957, a show which continues today on WTKT (hosted by Toby Young). Harris broke through racial barriers in Harrisburg broadcasting when he was hired by WHP to be a full-time radio and television host in 1966. Harris was a fixture in the Harrisburg community throughout his adult life through his broadcasting, ministerial, and civic work. Like Mike Ross, he was also an accomplished singer.
- Joseph "Anthony" McGranaghan (1943) started his broadcast career as the night DJ at WKBO in 1961. He remained with the station as music director until 1964 when he became program director of WCBG in Chambersburg; in 1968 he became manager of the station. In the mid-1970s he served as general manager of WHJB and WOKU-FM in Greensburg. In 1978 he became executive vice-president of WKOK and WQKX in Sunbury; he later was named president of the stations' owner, Sunbury Broadcasting Corporation. He was inducted into the Pennsylvania Broadcasting "Hall of Fame" in 2011. McGranaghan is credited as one of the first broadcasters to make extensive use of computers in the industry.

=== 1970s ===
In 1971, WKBO was purchased by Harrea Broadcasting and it began its period of market dominance as a rock and roll then a Top 40 station.

In 1973, it moved its transmitter to City Island and greatly improved its coverage. The station continued with the Top 40 format until the late 1970s by which time AM radio had already begun its long, steady decline.

On March 28, 1979, traffic reporter Dave Edwards noticed something unusual at the Three Mile Island Nuclear Power plant. The plant appeared to be non-operational because there was no steam coming from the cooling towers. There was also a large contingent of emergency vehicles in and around the plant. Upon learning this, the WKBO news director, Mike Pintek, called the plant, he was told "I can't talk right now, we've got a problem." This prompted Pintek to make several follow up calls to the plant's owner, Metropolitan Edison, developing the breaking news story. WKBO was the first media outlet to report the story at 8:25am, almost four and a half hours after the partial meltdown began. By 9am, the AP picked up the story and it was broadcast nationally.

=== 1980s ===
In early 1985, WKBO was replaced by Wink 104 in the ratings. During the rest of the 1980s, the station had an AC format. Becoming a CNN radio affiliate, it then changed to news radio by 1989.

=== 1990s-2000s ===
In 1996, WKBO switched to adult standards, broadcasting the satellite syndicated Music of Your Life format from Jones Radio. That format lasted until 2000, when Clear Channel leased its entire broadcast day to One Heart Ministries, which turned it into a contemporary Christian station.

In 1998, the City of Harrisburg decided to end the transmitter site lease at city island in order to develop the site for recreational, planning a restaurant complex called Kahunaville. The transmitter was moved to the Harrisburg Water plant. This installation is one of the few where a Wireless Mobile transmitting tower is successfully combined with an AM broadcasting tower. Kahunaville remains un-built, the original City Island transmitter site is now a parking lot.

=== 2000s ===
In 2010, Clear Channel sold WKBO to One Heart Ministries, Inc., which moved its studios to Warm Hearts Cafe (now Stage and Studio Cafe) in Mechanicsburg, Pennsylvania.
