= Bob Durgin =

American talk radio host (1943–2018)

Robert Austin Durgin
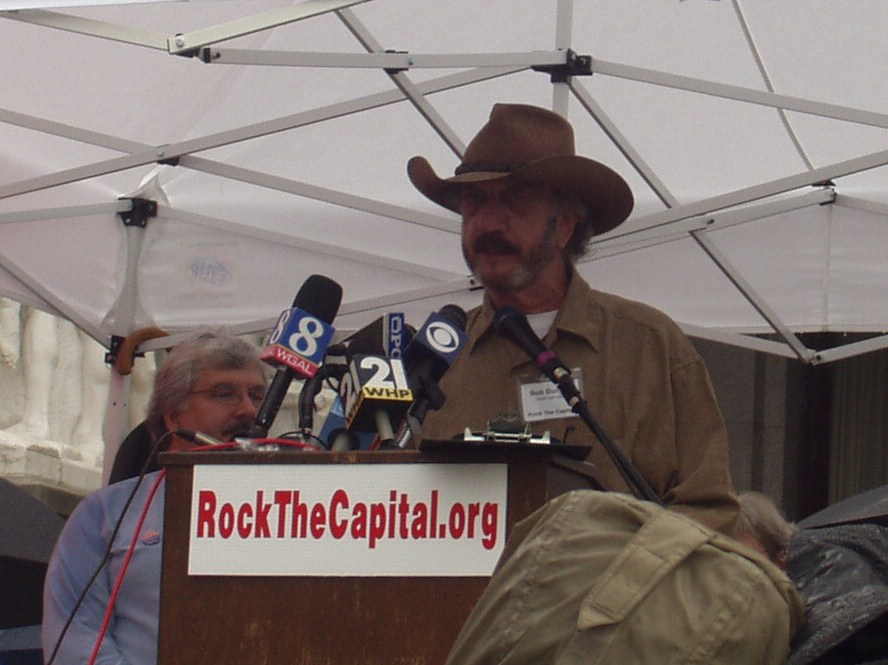
- Durgin speaking at a PACleanSweep protest against the General Assembly payraise
- Born: January 20, 1943; Boston, Massachusetts, U.S.
- Died: December 24, 2018 (aged 75); Marysville, Pennsylvania, U.S.
- Occupation: Radio host
- Years active: 1964–2013

Robert Austin Durgin (January 20, 1943 – December 24, 2018) was an American radio personality, prominent in Pennsylvania.

== Early life and career ==
Durbin was born in Boston, Massachusetts, and raised in King of Prussia, Pennsylvania. He joined the United States Air Force in 1962 and was stationed in Germany and Turkey. He became an Airman Second Class. He began his radio career in Europe in 1964. Upon his return, he worked as news director for KTOK in Oklahoma City, Oklahoma. In 1989, he began working at WHP (AM) in Harrisburg, Pennsylvania. There, his radio show became "consistently popular" and was credited for increasing WHP to second place in its market. He was named the "Reader's Choice" best local talk show host in the Harrisburg area by Harrisburg Magazine.

== The Bob Durgin Show ==
Durgin was known for wearing a Stetson hat and cowboy boots and for his catchphrases "Shut Up and Pay Your Taxes" and “Give Me a Physical Break!” His personality was described as "rowdy" and his political leanings were "conservative."

Durgin's radio show was the center of several political events and controversies. During the 1996 election for Pennsylvania Treasurer, Republican Barbara Hafer called Durgin's show to respond to comments by incumbent Democratic Treasurer Catherine Baker Knoll saying that Hafer had misused public funds. Hafer told Durgin on air that Knoll and her daughter, Mina Baker Knoll who was running for the Democratic nomination to succeed her mother, were "lying through their teeth. They are lying scumbags. I'm telling you, they are lying. They are outrageous." Pressed by Durgin, Hafer added "Scumbags, that is exactly what they were. And I'll tell you, if we were in Western Pennsylvania I'd do a South Side salute, and Cathy knows exactly what that is." In a later interview, Hafer did not retract her comments but noted that she might have "second thoughts" about her language.

In 2004, State Representative Tom Creighton introduced legislation that would delay sheriff sales after hearing a segment on Durgin's show about an elderly woman whose home was sold for $15,000 because she hadn't paid $300 in property taxes.

On July 8, 2013, Bob Durgin announced his retirement. "I feel as though, not only am I giving up a career, which is a lot, but I'm giving up a way of life," Bob Durgin, age 70, said on his show. His last show was broadcast on August 2, 2013.

== Political activism ==
Durgin led protests against the 1995 Pennsylvania General Assembly pay raise, both on his radio program and as a leader of large-scale protests like "The Rotunda Roundup" rally at the Pennsylvania State Capitol.

Following the 2005 legislative pay raise, Durgin's show became "ground zero in Central Pennsylvania for public outrage over the raise." Legislators, including Roy Baldwin, noticed increases in the volume of critical emails and phone calls about the pay raise when Durgin did shows about the pay raise. Journalist Tom Barnes noted that Durgin "complains about the raise nearly every day on his show." During the summer legislative recess, Durgin collected over 129,000 signatures that he presented to legislators during a "Rock the Capitol" event upon their return to the Pennsylvania State Capitol. He unveiled the petitions by carpeting the steps of the State Capitol, before leading 100 supporters through the halls looking to lobby their legislators to repeal the pay raise. To avoid a confrontation with the protesters, the Pennsylvania Senate recessed for private caucus meetings Aides to John Perzel denied access to his office because of size concerns.

In 2007, he was presented with an honor from a reform group protesting the Pennsylvania Society by holding a potluck dinner in the state capitol.
