= WHKF =

- Harrisburg, Pennsylvania; United States
- Broadcast area: Harrisburg–Carlisle metropolitan statistical area South Central Pennsylvania
- Frequency: 99.3 MHz (HD Radio)
- Branding: Real 99.3

Programming
- Language: English
- Format: Urban contemporary
- Subchannels: HD2: Air1 (Contemporary worship music)
- Affiliations: Premiere Networks

Ownership
- Owner: iHeartMedia; (iHM Licenses, LLC)
- Sister stations: WHP; WLAN-FM; WRBT; WRVV; WTKT

History
- First air date: July 1965
- Former call signs: WSFM (1965–1987); WHIT (1987–1988); WIMX (1988–1995); WYMJ (1995); WWKL-FM (1995–2001)
- Call sign meaning: Harrisburg's Kiss FM (former branding)

Technical information
- Licensing authority: FCC
- Facility ID: 23464
- Class: A
- ERP: 1,350 watts
- HAAT: 207 meters (679 ft)
- Transmitter coordinates: 40°11′30.3″N 76°52′3.9″W
- Translator: See § Translators

Links
- Public license information: Public file; LMS
- Webcast: Listen live (via iHeartRadio)
- Website: real993.iheart.com

WHKF (99.3 FM, "Real 99.3") is a commercial radio station licensed to serve Harrisburg, Pennsylvania. Owned by iHeartMedia, the station broadcasts an urban contemporary format.

== History ==
The station first signed on the air in July 1965, by Hudson Broadcasting Corp. as WSFM. The studios and transmitter were co-located with WCMB on Poplar Church Road (40°15′45.10″N 76°54′37.155″W) in Wormleysburg, Pennsylvania. Through the 1960s and early 1970s, the station's format was MOR like its sister station, but it did not duplicate WCMB. In 1978, the station rebranded as Rock 99 with a format change to CHR ("Top 40") and began competing with WKBO and WQXA-FM in York.

In 1981, the format was changed to adult contemporary and the branding to WSFM-99, then Sunny 99-FM. On June 29, 1987, it switched back to CHR, branded as 99 HIT-FM with the WHIT call sign. In 1988, Barnstable Broadcasting purchased the station. The call sign was changed to WIMX, the branding to Mix 99.3 and the format changed several times over the years before settling on a mix of "Hot Talk" (WFAN-AM's Imus in the Morning, WJFK-FM's Don and Mike afternoons) and "Hot Music" (rhythmic CHR).

In 1995, the station's owner, Gemini Broadcasting, was on the verge of bankruptcy and sold the station (along with WCMB) to Barnstable Broadcasting. Following the sale, Barnstable changed the station's call letters to WYMJ in March 1995, in anticipation of a format change. On June 30, 1995, the station's format and call sign swapped with sister station KOOL 94.9, moving KOOL's oldies format to 99.3, rebranded as KOOL 99.3 (WYMJ became "Magic 94.9", a hot AC format which did not gain traction in the market and changed formats within months to WRBT). Dame Media bought the station in 1997, the Dame Media stations were bought by Clear Channel Communications in 1999.

On July 1, 2001, Clear Channel rebranded the station as KISS-FM, changed the call sign to WHKF and changed the format back to CHR. Prior to launching, Clear Channel began stunting by playing a continuous sound effect of a small, noisy crowd. As the station's launch drew closer, the voiceover began announcing "Tomorrow at noon ... the talking stops". This was thought to be a direct shot at popular afternoon drive talk show host Bruce Bond, of Wink 104, who has since left that station.

On April 2, 2018, in response to Cumulus Media moving WWKL to 106.7 FM (thus expanding the station's CHR format to cover Lancaster, York, and Reading), WHKF began redirecting listeners to sister station WLAN-FM. On April 4, at 11 am, after playing "Never Be the Same" by Camila Cabello, the station flipped to alternative rock as Alt 99.3. This move removed redundancy with WLAN-FM, and also provided a competitor to Cumulus's WQXA-FM. The first song on "Alt" was "This is War" by Thirty Seconds to Mars.

On May 28, 2021, at 11 am, after playing "Tongue Tied" by Grouplove, the station began stunting with a loop of "It's the End of the World as We Know It (And I Feel Fine)" by REM. At Noon, following a single playing of "Good Riddance (Time of Your Life)" by Green Day, the station flipped to urban contemporary as "Real 99.3". The first song on "Real" was "Dreams and Nightmares" by Philadelphia native Meek Mill.

== Translators ==
WHKF-HD2 programming (Air1) is broadcast on the following translator:

| Call sign | Frequency | City of license | FID | ERP (W) | HAAT | Class | Transmitter coordinates | FCC info |
|---|---|---|---|---|---|---|---|---|
| W269AS | 101.7 FM | Carlisle, Pennsylvania | 20863 | 160 | 307 m (1,007 ft) | D | 40°20′43.1″N 76°52′8.3″W | LMS |
