= WBYN-FM =

- Boyertown, Pennsylvania; United States
- Broadcast area: Reading, Pennsylvania
- Frequency: 107.5 MHz
- Branding: 107.5 Alive

Programming
- Language: English
- Format: Christian radio

Ownership
- Owner: WDAC Radio Company
- Sister stations: WDAC

History
- First air date: 1969
- Former call signs: WBYO (1969–1989); WYCL (1989–1992); WBYN (1992–2005); WBYN-FM (2005–2006); WFKB (2006–2009)
- Call sign meaning: Boyertown

Technical information
- Licensing authority: FCC
- Facility ID: 71310
- Class: B
- ERP: 30,000 Watts
- HAAT: 186 meters (610 ft)
- Transmitter coordinates: 40°24′15.3″N 75°39′7.6″W
- Translator: 103.7 W279CB (Reading)

Links
- Public license information: Public file; LMS
- Webcast: Listen live
- Website: 1075alive.com

WBYN-FM (107.5 FM) is a Christian radio station licensed to Boyertown, Pennsylvania and serveing the Reading area. The station plays contemporary praise and worship Christian music along with Christian feature programs and church services. The station is under ownership of WDAC Radio Company. WBYN has two transmitters. The main transmitter is in a rural area 6 miles away from the station. The auxiliary transmitter and tower is located behind the station at 280 Mill street. Its coordinates are 40°19′04.64″N 75°38′59.81″W.

== History ==
This radio station was founded by Dave Hendricks and was first assigned the call sign WBYO in 1969. The station employed a Christian teaching format with traditional Christian music played in between features and was a commercial operation but steered clear of contemporary Christian Music except for a few hours on Saturday afternoon.

On September 14, 1989, the station was sold and changed the call sign to WYCL and flipped to a gold based down-tempo adult contemporary music format. The station played a couple new songs per hour but leaned light. The station played several up-tempo songs an hour. Artists included The Beatles, Billy Joel, Kenny Rogers, Whitney Houston, Gloria Estefan, Chicago, The Supremes, Elton John, The Stylistics, George Michael, and others. After a few years, the station proved to be successful with the new format, beating WRFY-FM in the ratings.

On January 24, 1992, the station was sold to WDAC Radio Company. It was assigned the call sign WBYN and returned to a Christian radio format which consisted of preaching, teaching, traditional Christian music, and information features. The station sold time blocks to various ministries.

The music was traditional Christian music and played a few hours in mornings, late afternoons, and weekends. Some time in the 1990s, the station began mixing in softer contemporary Christian artists as well as Contemporary Praise and Worship Music. By 2000, the station was playing mostly Praise and Worship music and adopted the phrase "Life Changing Radio".

=== WFKB Frank FM ===
WFKB logo used from 2006 to 2009

On September 19, 2005, the call sign was slightly altered to WBYN-FM in preparation for a simulcast with 1160 AM (formerly WYNS), which adopted the WBYN call sign a week later. WBYN-FM were entered into a local marketing agreement (LMA) with Nassau Broadcasting Partners, owner of WBYN AM, early in 2006. WBYN AM kept the Christian format while WBYN-FM became "Frank FM" WFKB on March 15, 2006, broadcasting an adult rock/classic rock hybrid formatted radio station. Frank FM had live air personalities during the day. Ken And Jenn in the morning, Randi Ellis middays (also PD/MD), Brian DiMario in afternoons, former WPLY jock John Von (who also served as Frank FM production director) at night, and Mike Roberts. Frank FM was also the launching pad for a then weekend personality named Rob Soscia, who now goes by his real name Brian Soscia and has worked for WISX and WSTW. Other on-air personalities included Jay Pinnel and Zack Morse. The station started off as a hybrid of hot AC, classic hits and pop alternative playing over 200 songs. By the end of 2006, the station evolved into more of a heavily rock leaning classic hits format, including songs up until 1995. Core artists included Billy Joel, Kansas, Phil Collins, The Beatles, Elton John, Led Zeppelin, Fleetwood Mac, Chicago, Boston, Eagles, James Taylor, The Who, Neil Young, Kenny Loggins, The Cars, and many others. WFKB also began broadcasting in HD Radio and began to multicast. WFKB analog and WFKB-HD1 broadcast "Frank FM" while WFKB-HD2 broadcast the Christian format of WBYN.

=== Return to WBYN-FM, coming Alive ===
Logo prior to flip to Alive FM

On March 31, 2009, the LMA between Nassau and WDAC Radio Company expired after being extended several times since November 2008 and the station's call sign reverted to WBYN-FM. On March 31, 2009, the station dropped the Frank FM format and reverted to a similar religious format it had been broadcasting prior to the LMA but not identical programming to WBYN AM. Nassau, which owned AM 1160, continued its own lineup of religious programming on that station. WBYN-FM's religious format focuses slightly more on music and slightly less on teaching, though Nassau's WBYN AM programming had a moderate amount of overlap with WBYN-FM's format. Though not consecutively, 107.5 has been a Christian-formatted station on the FM dial for over fifty years.

As of early 2018, WBYN-FM's signature catchphrase was "Positively Different 107.5 Alive".

== See also ==
- Media in the Lehigh Valley
