= WRVV =

- Harrisburg, Pennsylvania; United States
- Broadcast area: South Central Pennsylvania
- Frequency: 97.3 MHz (HD Radio)
- Branding: The River 97.3

Programming
- Language: English
- Format: Classic rock
- Subchannels: HD2: Talk radio (WHP)

Ownership
- Owner: iHeartMedia, Inc.; (iHM Licenses, LLC)
- Sister stations: WHKF; WHP; WLAN-FM; WRBT; WTKT

History
- First air date: June 6, 1946
- Former call signs: WHP-FM (1946–1990); WXBB (1990); WHP-FM (1990–1992)
- Former frequencies: 43.5 MHz (1945) (CP)
- Call sign meaning: "River"

Technical information
- Licensing authority: FCC
- Facility ID: 15324
- Class: B
- ERP: 15,000 watts (analog); 475 watts (digital)
- HAAT: 260 meters (850 ft)
- Transmitter coordinates: 40°20′43.3″N 76°52′7.9″W

Links
- Public license information: Public file; LMS
- Webcast: Listen live (via iHeartRadio)
- Website: theriver973.iheart.com

WRVV (97.3 FM, "The River 97.3") is a commercial radio station licensed to Harrisburg, Pennsylvania, United States. The station is owned by iHeartMedia, Inc. and broadcasts a classic rock format. The station's studios are located at 600 Corporate Circle in Harrisburg.

WRVV's transmitter is sited on the WHP-TV tower on Blue Mountain in Susquehanna Township. WRVV broadcasts in HD Radio; the HD2 digital subchannel simulcasts the talk radio programming on WHP (580 AM).

== History ==
=== WHP-FM ===
On January 10, 1945, WHP, Inc. applied to the Federal Communications Commission for a construction permit for a new station on 43.5 MHz on the original 42-50 MHz broadcast band. After the FCC created the current FM band on June 27, 1945, the Commission granted the permit on November 21, 1945, while modifying it by reassigning the station to 97.3 MHz on the new FM band. The FCC then granted permission to begin broadcasting at any time beginning on March 18, 1946.

WHP, Inc operated the station under special temporary authority (STA) for several years, during which time numerous changes were made to the station's broadcast facilities. On June 6, 1946, the station first signed on with the WHP-FM call sign. Its power was only 4,300 watts. WHP-AM-FM originally simulcast their programming. WHP was a long-time affiliate of the CBS Radio Network, so the two stations carried CBS's dramas, comedies, news and sports during the "Golden Age of Radio". In the 1950s, WHP-FM duplicated WHP about 50% of the broadcast day, with the remainder devoted to instrumentals and some classical music programming. In addition to the two radio stations, a television station was added in 1953, Channel 21 WHP-TV.

In the 1960s, WHP-FM's programming split entirely from WHP (AM). Its format evolved to beautiful music, which would continue for more than two decades. The station played quarter-hour sweeps of soft instrumental music, including cover versions of popular adult hits, Broadway and Hollywood show tunes. In the late 1980s, however, the audience for soft instrumental music was aging and management decided a change was needed. By March 1988, WHP-FM had tweaked the format to "music-intensive soft adult contemporary". Central Pennsylvania already had several soft AC stations, including 101.3 WROZ and 103.3 WSBA-FM (now WARM-FM), so this format only lasted for two years.

=== WXBB ===
In February 1990, the station switched its call letters to WXBB, and flipped to hot adult contemporary as B97.3. The hot AC format was short-lived. In December 1990, the station returned to easy listening for another two years as WHP-FM.

In March 1992, WHP-AM-FM were sold to Pennsylvania Broadcasting Associates, a division of Dame Media, which separated the stations from WHP-TV. Studios were moved out of the WHP-TV building to their current location at 600 Corporate Circle in Harrisburg. The FM station went through numerous changes following the sale.

=== WRVV ===
The call sign was changed to WRVV on March 16, 1992. The station's branding was switched to The River 97.3. It was the first station in the country to be branded as The River. WRVV's slogan was changed to "Rock and Roll without the Hard Edge". The station changed format to "rock adult contemporary".

The format played tracks from popular rock albums released over the previous 15 years intended for a general rock listener not interested in current titles. The station's Operations Manager at the time, Chris Tyler, created the format.

=== iHeartMedia ownership ===
In August 1998, the Dame Media stations, including WHP and WRVV, were sold to Clear Channel Communications, the forerunner to iHeartMedia, Inc. The format changed to classic rock after the sale. In the mid-2000s, the station changed its slogan to "Real. Rock. Variety".

In 2004, WRVV and Cumulus Media's WNNK-FM were the first stations in Harrisburg to begin using HD Radio. Since the mid-1990s, WRVV and WNNK frequently trade the number one spot in Nielsen Audio's Harrisburg-Lebanon-Carlisle radio market.
