= WRBT =

- Harrisburg, Pennsylvania; United States
- Broadcast area: Harrisburg–Carlisle metropolitan statistical area; South Central Pennsylvania
- Frequency: 94.9 MHz (HD Radio)
- Branding: Bob 94.9

Programming
- Language: English
- Format: Country
- Subchannels: HD2: WTKT simulcast (sports)
- Affiliations: Premiere Networks

Ownership
- Owner: iHeartMedia, Inc.; (iHM Licenses, LLC)
- Sister stations: WHKF; WHP; WLAN-FM; WRVV; WTKT

History
- First air date: September 30, 1962
- Former call signs: WMSP (1962–88); WHKS (1988); WWKL (1988–95); WYMJ (1995–97)
- Call sign meaning: "Robert" (proper name for Bob)

Technical information
- Licensing authority: FCC
- Facility ID: 54019
- Class: B
- ERP: 25,000 watts (horizontal); 24,500 watts (vertical)
- HAAT: 201 meters (659 ft)
- Transmitter coordinates: 40°18′58.3″N 76°56′59.9″W

Links
- Public license information: Public file; LMS
- Webcast: Listen live (via iHeartRadio); HD2: Listen live (via iHeartRadio)
- Website: bob949.iheart.com

WRBT (94.9 FM, "Bob 94.9") is a country music radio station broadcasting in Harrisburg, Pennsylvania. The station is owned by iHeartMedia, Inc. and broadcasts with a power of 25 kilowatts from a transmitter site in Enola, Pennsylvania.

WRBT broadcasts in the HD Radio format.

== History ==
The station signed on the air on September 30, 1962, then owned by the Market Square Presbyterian Church, hence the original call letters WMSP. It was run as a volunteer radio station, parishioners volunteered to do air shifts, broadcasting a classical music format. The station was sold in 1988 to Barnstable Broadcasting, who changed the format to adult contemporary first, then an oldies format, KOOL 94.9. In 1995, Barnstable switched formats and call letters with its 99.3 signal, turning the 94.9 signal into WYMJ Magic 94.9. The generic mix format never did well and Barnstable put all of its Harrisburg market stations for sale in late 1996.

In December 1996, the sale was consummated with Dame Media the call letters were changed to WRBT and Dame launched the country format that is heard on the radio today.

Brad Chambers (from KPLX in Dallas) was hired as the program director. Bob 94.9 was well received in the community. Through hard work and many promotions, remote broadcasts and other local involvement, it took over the "top country spot" from (Cat Country 106.7). The original staff with the station was as follows:

- Mornings: Todd Jeffers, Nancy Ryan, Allen Willis (Nancy & Buzz 1999-2001)
- Mid-days: Shelly Easton (at Cat Country 96 in Allentown, Pa)
- Afternoons: Brad Chambers, PD (now working in Los Angeles)
- Evenings: Wes & Ang (Wes is John Beaston on the morning show on Wink 104, and Ang is currently the morning show co-host at the Beach 96.5 in Corpus Christi, TX)
- Overnights: "After MidNite" With Blair Garner (now on the station with Granger Smith)

== On-air personalities ==
- Nancy Ryan
- Newman
- Holly Love
- Jeff Hurley
- Bob Hauer
