= WLAN-FM =

- Lancaster, Pennsylvania; United States
- Broadcast area: South Central Pennsylvania
- Frequency: 96.9 MHz
- Branding: FM97

Programming
- Language: English
- Format: Contemporary hit radio
- Affiliations: iHeartRadio; Premiere Networks

Ownership
- Owner: iHeartMedia; (iHM Licenses, LLC)
- Sister stations: WHKF; WHP; WRBT; WRVV; WTKT

History
- First air date: January 1948
- Former frequencies: 92.3 MHz (1945–1947)
- Call sign meaning: Lancaster

Technical information
- Licensing authority: FCC
- Facility ID: 52259
- Class: B
- ERP: 50,000 watts
- HAAT: 152 meters (499 ft)
- Transmitter coordinates: 40°2′52.3″N 76°27′23.9″W

Links
- Public license information: Public file; LMS
- Webcast: Listen live (via iHeartRadio)
- Website: fm97.iheart.com

WLAN-FM (96.9 MHz, "FM 97 WLAN") is a commercial radio station licensed to serve Lancaster, Pennsylvania. The station is owned by iHeartMedia through licensee iHM Licenses, LLC. WLAN-FM broadcasts a contemporary hit radio music radio format. Studios are located on Crown Avenue in Lancaster and the station's broadcast tower is located on Prospect Road in West Hempfield Township.

== History ==
On December 5, 1945, the Federal Communications Commission (FCC) granted Peoples Broadcasting Company a construction permit for a new station on 92.3 MHz. Sam Altdoerffer owned Peoples Broadcasting. The station was assigned the WLAN-FM call sign by the FCC on February 27, 1947. On May 14, 1947, the FCC reassigned the station to 96.9 MHz. The station went through several changes in transmitter location, effective radiated power (ERP) and antenna height above average terrain (HAAT) by the time its first license was granted on April 14, 1952.

WLAN-FM was a companion to WLAN. In its early years, WLAN-FM simulcast the programming of its AM sister station. By the 1970s, WLAN-FM was airing a separate album-oriented rock format and was an affiliate of the ABC Radio FM Network.

On March 20, 1980, the station was granted a construction permit to relocate the transmitter to its current location in West Hempfield Township, Lancaster County. The station was granted a new license with the new facilities on November 20, 1980.

In the early 1990s, FM97 had begun to lose both audience and revenue share to several competing radio stations in the Lancaster, York and Harrisburg radio markets. New GM/VP Chuck Lontine, with the help of Scott Shannon (then the program director of WPLJ in New York City), created "The New Sound of FM 97 WLAN" in September 1993. This sound was a hybrid radio format of hot AC, Top 40 and some classic rock. By avoiding hip hop and softer music, Lontine created a "listener delta strategy" between the popular WROZ (The Rose), which was soft adult contemporary and harder edged stations in the market playing urban/hip hop and album rock. The results were favorable primarily with women between the ages of 25 and 34. Within a year, the station was ranked number one in the market by the Arbitron Ratings Company.

The station's license was transferred from Peoples Broadcasting Company to Clear Channel Communications on September 29, 1997.

In April 2018, in response to Cumulus Media moving WWKL to 106.7 (expanding the station's CHR format to cover Lancaster, York, and Reading), iHeartMedia began redirecting WHKF listeners to WLAN-FM to add Harrisburg to its scope. WHKF subsequently flipped to an alternative rock format. FM 97 covers Lancaster, Reading, York, Harrisburg, & Hershey.

In June 2026, WLAN-FM’s remaining local on-air DJs (Leah Tyler and Damian Rhodes) were laid off as a result of a reorganization by parent company IHeartMedia.
