= WHP (AM) =

- Harrisburg, Pennsylvania; United States
- Broadcast area: Harrisburg metropolitan area
- Frequency: 580 kHz
- Branding: NewsRadio WHP 580

Programming
- Format: Talk radio
- Affiliations: Fox News Radio; Premiere Networks; WPMT

Ownership
- Owner: iHeartMedia, Inc.; (iHM Licenses, LLC)
- Sister stations: WHKF; WLAN-FM; WRBT; WRVV; WTKT

History
- First air date: February 10, 1925
- Former call signs: WHBG (1925–1926); WMBS (1926–1929)
- Former frequencies: 1300 kHz (1925–1926); 833 kHz (1926–1927); 820 kHz (1927–1928); 1280 kHz (1928); 1430 kHz (1928–1941); 1460 kHz (1941–1951)
- Call sign meaning: Harrisburg, Pennsylvania

Technical information
- Licensing authority: FCC
- Facility ID: 15322
- Class: B
- Power: 5,000 watts
- Transmitter coordinates: 40°18′11.32″N 76°57′5.91″W
- Translator: 103.7 W279EC (Harrisburg)
- Repeater: 97.3 WRVV-HD2 (Harrisburg)

Links
- Public license information: Public file; LMS
- Webcast: Listen live (via iHeartRadio)
- Website: whp580.iheart.com

WHP (580 kHz) is a commercial radio station licensed to Harrisburg, Pennsylvania, serving the Harrisburg metropolitan area. It broadcasts a talk radio format, and is owned by iHeartMedia, Inc. The station's studios are on Corporate Circle in Harrisburg, off North Progress Avenue.

WHP is powered at 5,000 watts, non-directional during the day. To protect other stations on 580 AM from interference at night, it uses a directional antenna with a six-tower array. Its transmitter is on Tower Road near Interstate 81 in East Pennsboro Township. Programming is simulcast on 130-watt FM translator 103.7 W279EC and on the HD2 digital subchannel of sister station 97.3 WRVV.

== Programming ==
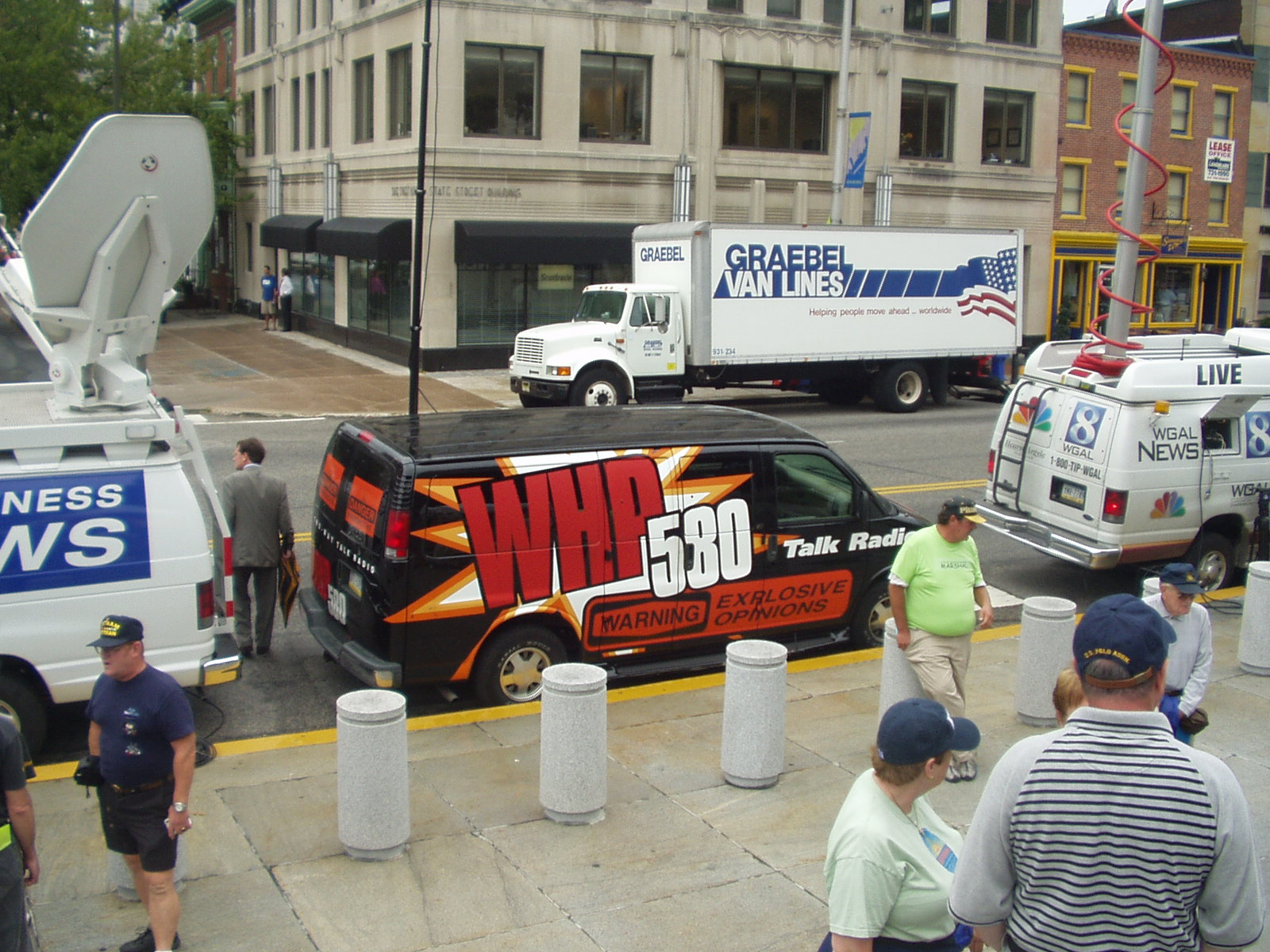
WHP's and other stations' vans at a local event.

Weekday mornings begin with a news and interview program hosted by R.J. Harris. The show is simulcast on co-owned 1340 WRAW in Reading. The rest of the weekday schedule is from iHeart subsidiary Premiere Networks: The Glenn Beck Radio Program, The Clay Travis and Buck Sexton Show, The Sean Hannity Show, The Jesse Kelly Show and Coast to Coast AM with George Noory. Weekends feature shows on money, health, guns, gardening, travel and technology, some of which are paid brokered programming. Syndicated weekend hosts include Rich DeMuro on Tech, Sunday Night with Bill Cunningham and Somewhere in Time with Art Bell. Most hours begin with an update from Fox News Radio.

Until July 2022, WHP had a local afternoon drive time host, Ken Matthews. Matthews was named one of the 100 most important talk radio show hosts (the "Heavy Hundred") in America by Talkers Magazine in 2020. Another past host on WHP was Bob Durgin, on the station from 1989 to 2013.

== History ==
=== WHBG and WMBS ===
The Department of Commerce granted John S. Skane a license for a new station, WHBG, on February 20, 1925. It had studios at 2810 North Fourth Street in Harrisburg, transmitting on 1300 kHz. In late 1926, ownership was transferred to Macks Battery Service, and the call sign was changed to WMBS. As of December 31, 1926, the station was reported to be operating on a self-assigned frequency of 833 kHz.

Following the formation of the Federal Radio Commission (FRC), the new regulators issued a series of temporary authorizations beginning on May 3, 1927, with WMBS assigned to 820 kHz. That was changed on June 1, 1927, to 1280 kHz. Stations were also informed that if they wanted to continue operating, they needed to file a formal license application by January 15, 1928, as the first step in determining whether they met the new "public interest, convenience, or necessity" standard. On May 25, 1928, the FRC issued General Order 32, which notified 164 stations, including WMBS, that "From an examination of your application for future license it does not find that public interest, convenience, or necessity would be served by granting it." However, the station successfully convinced the commission that it should remain licensed.

On November 11, 1928, the FRC implemented a major reallocation of station transmitting frequencies, as part of a reorganization resulting from its implementation of General Order 40. WMBS was assigned to 1430 kHz, sharing this frequency with WKBN in Youngstown, Ohio. On October 19, 1928, the FRC granted Mack's Battery Company a construction permit to move the station to 1430 kHz, followed by a new license for operation on the new frequency on January 31, 1929. WMBS was required to share 1430 kHz with WBAK and hence it could not be a full-time station.

=== WHP ===
The station's license was transferred by the FRC to Pennsylvania Broadcasting Company effective March 22, 1929, accompanied by a change in call sign to WHP. On December 1, 1930, the FRC granted another transfer of the license to WHP, Incorporated. On January 26, 1933, WHP was granted full time operation, no longer having to share its frequency. The FRC granted WHP full-time operation (6 am to 1 am) on April 27, 1934.

WHP moved from 1430 kHz to 1460 kHz on March 29, 1941. On that day, 795 US radio stations changed frequency as the result of the North American Regional Broadcasting Agreement (NARBA), signed in Havana with representatives from Canada, US, Mexico, Cuba, Haiti, and the Dominican Republic.

For most of its history, WHP was a network affiliate of CBS Radio. It carried CBS's schedule of dramas, comedies, news, sports, soap operas, game shows and big band broadcasts during the "Golden Age of Radio". In an advertisement in the 1952 Broadcasting Yearbook, WHP is described as "The Key Station of the Keystone State". The ad says WHP is "welcomed into tens of thousands of homes in Pennsylvania's rich South-Central belt. It is the CBS station serving Harrisburg, Lancaster, York and Lebanon."

=== FM and TV stations ===
In 1946, an FM station was added, WHP-FM. It originally broadcast on 43.5 MHz, moving to 97.3 MHz several months later. In its early years, WHP-FM mostly simulcast the AM station, later switching to beautiful music in the 1960s and is today classic rock WRVV "97.3 The River".

In 1953, a television station was added, WHP-TV, originally on Channel 55 and later on Channel 21. Because WHP had long been a CBS Radio affiliate, WHP-TV carried CBS television programs, along with some shows from the DuMont Television Network.

The Federal Communications Commission granted WHP a construction permit on January 6, 1950, to move the station from 1460 kHz to 580 kHz, followed by a license for operation on the new frequency effective May 1, 1952. The frequency lower on the AM dial gave WHP a stronger signal. The move was coupled with an increase in nighttime power to 5,000 watts, allowing it to cover most of South Central Pennsylvania day and night.

As network programming moved from radio to television in the 1950s and 1960s, WHP switched to a full service, middle of the road (MOR) format of popular adult music, news, talk and sports. In the 1980s, as music listening moved from AM to FM radio. On June 1, 1987, WHP added C-QUAM AM stereo. WHP added more talk programming and by the 1990s, it had transitioned to a talk radio station.

=== iHeart ownership ===
Former logo

In August 1998, the Dame Media stations, including WHP and WRVV, were sold to Clear Channel Communications, the forerunner to iHeartMedia. In 2007, Clear Channel sold WHP-TV and its other television properties to concentrate on radio. WHP-TV is currently owned by the Sinclair Broadcast Group, even though it continues to share its call letters with WHP radio.

WHP once broadcast using HD Radio technology. Its digital signal was reported off the air as of July 2017. It remains on an FM HD radio subchannel of WRVV.

== Translator ==
WHP (AM) programming is simulcast on the following FM translator:

Call sign	Frequency	City of license	FID	ERP (W)	HAAT	Class	Transmitter coordinates	FCC info
W279EC	103.7 FM	Harrisburg, Pennsylvania	202574	130	224 m (735 ft)	D	40°11′31.3″N 76°52′0.1″W	LMS

== See also ==
- List of three-letter broadcast call signs in the United States
