= WDAC =

- Lancaster, Pennsylvania; United States
- Broadcast area: South Central Pennsylvania
- Frequency: 94.5 MHz (HD Radio)

Programming
- Language: English
- Format: Christian radio
- Subchannels: HD2: Christian radio "HOPE Music for the Heart!"
- Affiliations: SRN News

Ownership
- Owner: WDAC Radio Company

History
- First air date: December 14, 1959
- Former call signs: WLPH (1959)
- Call sign meaning: Dean Alan Crawford, son of the founder.

Technical information
- Licensing authority: FCC
- Facility ID: 71309
- Class: B
- ERP: 19,000 watts
- HAAT: 247 meters (810 ft)
- Transmitter coordinates: 39°53′46.3″N 76°14′20.8″W
- Translator: See § Translators

Links
- Public license information: Public file; LMS
- Website: wdac.com

WDAC (94.5 FM) is a commercial radio station licensed to Lancaster, Pennsylvania, known as "Hope 94.5". It is owned by the WDAC Radio Company and broadcasts a Christian radio format. Christian adult contemporary music is heard in morning drive time and late evenings. Other hours feature Christian talk and teaching shows from David Jeremiah, Jim Daly, Nancy DeMoss Wolgemuth, Alistair Begg, Chuck Swindoll and others. WDAC's studios and transmitter are on Lancaster Pike in New Providence.

WDAC has an effective radiated power (ERP) of 19,000 watts. It broadcasts using HD Radio technology. Its HD2 digital subchannel has a Christian radio format with the slogan "HOPE Music for the Heart!"

== History ==
The Federal Communications Commission (FCC) granted Percy B. Crawford a construction permit for a new FM station on April 15, 1959. The original call sign was WLPH. On May 25, 1959, the call sign was changed to WDAC.

WDAC signed on for first time on December 14, 1959. It was granted its first license on August 1, 1960. On December 16, 1960, the FCC granted a reassignment of the station's license to Ruth Marjorie Crawford following the death of Percy Crawford.

On June 19, 1973, the FCC granted a voluntary reassignment of the station's license to the WDAC Radio Company, effective July 2, 1973. From its earliest days, the station has broadcast a Christian radio format.

Former logo

== Translators ==
WDAC programming is broadcast on the following translators:

Call sign	Frequency (MHz)	City of license	State	Facility ID	Class	ERP (W)	Height (m (ft))	Transmitter coordinates	Rebroadcasts
W246BI	97.1	Middletown	Delaware	156585	D	80	50.5 m (166 ft)	39°32′4.4″N 75°42′35.8″W	WDAC
W280CP	103.9	Wagontown	Pennsylvania	71312	D	5	10 m (33 ft)	40°00′44.3″N 75°50′32.8″W	WDAC
W284BF	104.7	Lancaster	Pennsylvania	144103	D	200	240 m (790 ft)	39°53′46.0″N 76°14′21.0″W	WDAC-HD2
W300BZ	107.9	Reading	Pennsylvania	87062	D	250	239.5 m (786 ft)	40°21′15.9″N 75°53′55.7″W	WDAC-HD2

== Signal note ==
WDAC is short-spaced to three other Class B stations: WDSD 94.7 Dover, Delaware; WIAD 94.7 Bethesda, Maryland; and WPST 94.5 Trenton, New Jersey.

WDSD and WIAD operate on 94.7 MHz, a first adjacent channel to WDAC. The distance between WDAC's transmitter and WDSD's transmitter is 60 miles, while the distance between WDAC's transmitter and WIAD's transmitter is 79 miles, as determined by FCC rules. The minimum distance between two Class B stations operating on first adjacent channels according to current FCC rules is 105 miles.

WDAC and WPST operate on the same channel and the distance between the two stations' transmitters is 76 miles as determined by FCC rules. The minimum distance between two Class B stations operating on the same channel according to current FCC rules is 150 miles.
