= WRFY-FM =

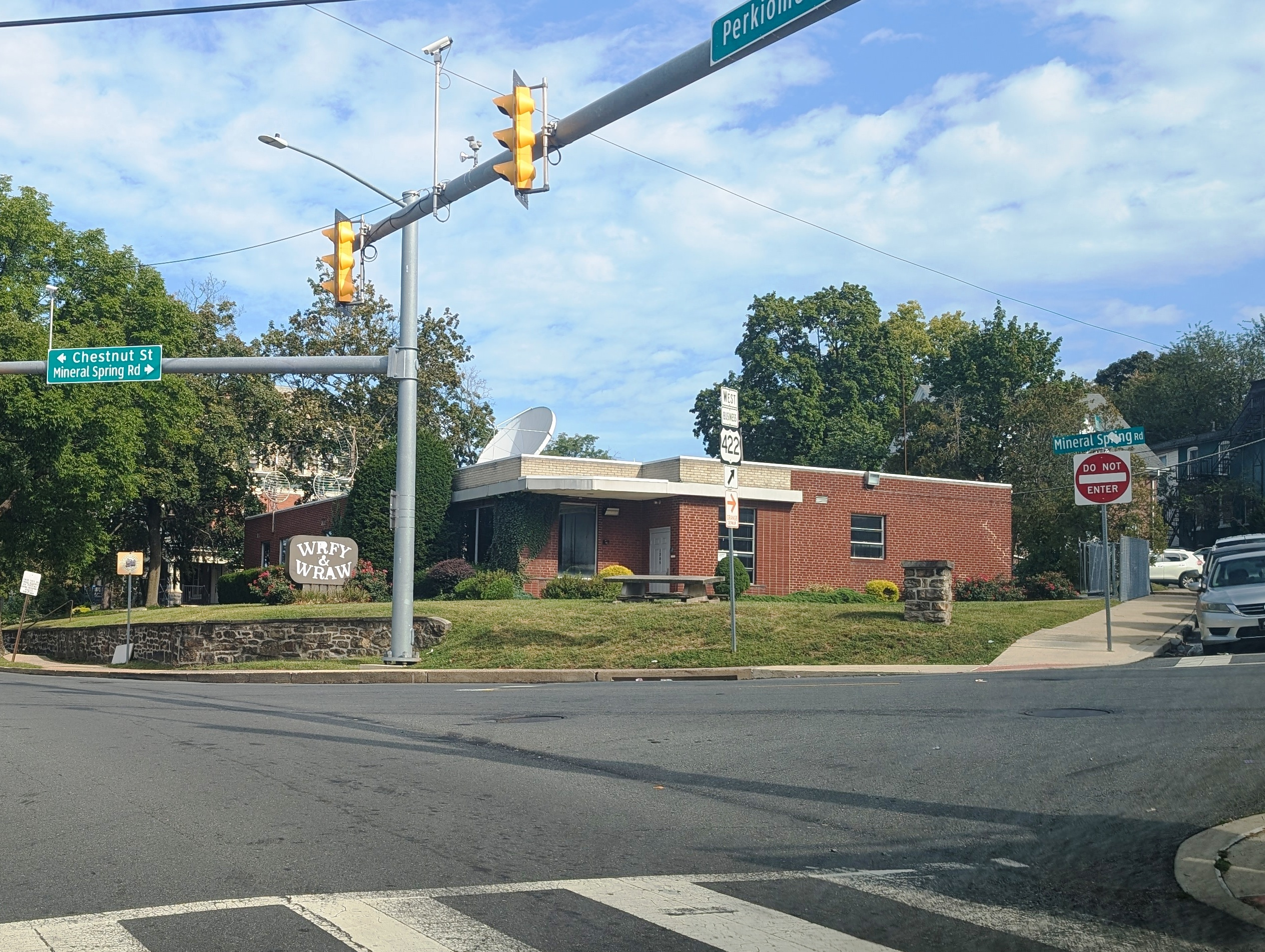
- Studios of WRFY and WRAW in Reading
- Reading, Pennsylvania; United States
- Broadcast area: Berks County
- Frequency: 102.5 MHz (HD Radio)
- Branding: Y102

Programming
- Languages: English; HD2/HD3: Spanish/English
- Format: Hot adult contemporary
- Subchannels: HD2: Spanish CHR "Rumba 92.3"; HD3: Spanish CHR "Rumba 100.5"

Ownership
- Owner: iHeartMedia, Inc.; (iHM Licenses, LLC)
- Sister stations: WRAW

History
- First air date: September 23, 1962

Technical information
- Licensing authority: FCC
- Facility ID: 69562
- Class: B
- ERP: 10,000 watts (analog); 400 watts (digital)
- HAAT: 246 meters (807 ft)
- Transmitter coordinates: 40°19′19.3″N 75°53′33.7″W
- Translator: See § Translators

Links
- Public license information: Public file; LMS
- Webcast: Listen live (via iHeartRadio); HD2: Listen live (via iHeartRadio); HD3: Listen live (via iHeartRadio)
- Website: y102reading.iheart.com; HD2: rumbareading.iheart.com; HD3: rumbalancaster.iheart.com

WRFY-FM (102.5 MHz) is a commercial radio station in Reading, Pennsylvania, calling itself "Y102". The station is owned by iHeartMedia through licensee iHM Licenses, LLC, and broadcasts a hot adult contemporary radio format. The studios and offices are on Perkiomen Avenue in Reading.

WRFY-FM has an effective radiated power (ERP) of 10,000 watts. Its transmitter tower is located on the east side of Reading on Neversink Mountain (40°19′19.0″N 75°53′34.0″W). The station's signal covers the cities of Lancaster, Allentown and Pottsville and the northwestern suburbs of Philadelphia. WRFY-FM broadcasts using HD Radio technology. Its HD-2 digital subchannel carries a Spanish-language contemporary hits format known as "Rumba 92.3", which feeds FM translator W222BY. Its HD-3 carries a similar format, "Rumba 100.5", feeding translator W263DB in Lancaster as the replacement for WLAN.

== History ==
On September 23, 1962, the station first signed on the air. It was owned by the City Broadcasting Company as a stand-alone FM station. (In that era, most FM stations were co-owned with AM or TV stations but WRFY-FM was not.) Its original studios were in Mount Penn.

By the 1970s, it had raised its power to 42,000 watts. Its tower is 807 feet (246 m) HAAT. It carried a beautiful music format, with quarter hour sweeps of instrumental cover versions of popular adult songs, including Broadway and Hollywood show tunes. It was an affiliate of the ABC FM Network.

By the 1980s, it had switched to a Top 40 format. It was affiliated with the RKO Radio Network for news and features. Over time, it moved in a more adult direction, making the transition to hot adult contemporary music.

In 1996, WRFY-FM was acquired by Clear Channel Communications, along with WRAW. In 2014, Clear Channel changed its name to iHeartMedia.

== Translators ==
The programming of WRFY-FM's HD Radio channels are broadcast on the following translators:

| Call sign | Frequency | City of license | FID | ERP (W) | HAAT | Class | Transmitter coordinates | FCC info | Notes |
|---|---|---|---|---|---|---|---|---|---|
| W222BY | 92.3 FM | Laureldale, Pennsylvania | 138520 | 90 (Vert.) | 242.4 m (795 ft) | D | 40°19′19.3″N 75°53′33.7″W | LMS | Relays HD2 |
| W263DB | 100.5 FM | Lancaster, Pennsylvania | 144779 | 250 (Vert.) | 0 m (0 ft) | D | 40°2′17.4″N 76°18′21.9″W | LMS | Relays HD3 |

== See also ==
- Media in the Lehigh Valley
