= Tom Barnes (American journalist) =

American journalist (1946–2016)

- Born: September 1, 1946; Carlisle, Pennsylvania, U.S.
- Died: October 11, 2016 (aged 70); Tucson, Arizona, U.S.
- Education: University of Michigan; University of Missouri
- Occupation: Journalist
- Notable credit: Pittsburgh Post-Gazette

Tom Barnes (September 1, 1946 – October 11, 2016) was an American journalist, who worked for the Pittsburgh Post-Gazette as Harrisburg Bureau Chief.

Barnes, a native of Pittsburgh, Pennsylvania, earned a B.A. degree from the University of Michigan and a M.A. in journalism from the University of Missouri. Following graduation, he worked for The Hartford Courant for ten years. In 1984, he began working at the Pittsburgh Post-Gazette, where he has covered Pittsburgh Mayors Richard Caliguiri and Sophie Masloff before taking the "development beat" in the mid-1990s, to cover the construction of Heinz Field, PNC Park, the David L. Lawrence Convention Center, and neighborhood development issues. In 2003, he was assigned to the Harrisburg Bureau Chief.

In 2005, he was named one of "Pennsylvania's Most Influential Reporters" by the Pennsylvania political news website PoliticsPA.

In 2014, Barnes and his wife Beth moved to Tucson, Arizona. He died at home on October 11, 2016, from prostate cancer at the age of 70.
