= WTKT =

- Harrisburg, Pennsylvania; United States
- Broadcast area: Harrisburg–Carlisle metropolitan statistical area South Central Pennsylvania
- Frequency: 1460 kHz
- Branding: Fox Sports 1460 Harrisburg

Programming
- Language: English
- Format: Sports
- Affiliations: Fox Sports Radio; Hershey Bears

Ownership
- Owner: iHeartMedia, Inc.; (iHM Licenses, LLC)
- Sister stations: WHKF; WHP; WLAN-FM; WRBT; WRVV

History
- First air date: February 19, 1948 (as WCMB)
- Former call signs: WCMB (1948–1991); WIMX (1991–1993); WCMB (1993–1998); WWKL (1998–2001)
- Call sign meaning: Ticket (previous branding)

Technical information
- Licensing authority: FCC
- Facility ID: 23463
- Class: B
- Power: 5,000 watts day; 4,200 watts night
- Transmitter coordinates: 40°18′32.57″N 76°56′11.4174″W

Links
- Public license information: Public file; LMS
- Webcast: Listen live (via iHeartRadio)
- Website: foxsports1460.iheart.com

WTKT (1460 AM, "Fox Sports 1460") is a radio station in Harrisburg, Pennsylvania. The station broadcasts with 5,000 watts power daytime non-directional and 4,200 watts night time power from a three tower antenna array in Summerdale, Pennsylvania. WTKT is the AM flagship station for Hershey Bears AHL hockey.

WTKT is licensed to broadcast in the HD Radio format.

== History ==
WTKT first signed on the air on February 19, 1948, as WCMB on 960 kHz with the city of license listed as Lemoyne, Pennsylvania. (Harrisburg Evening News, February 19, 1948, page 21) The transmitter and antenna were located on Poplar Church Road(40°15′45.10″N 76°54′37.155″W) across the river from Harrisburg, in Wormleysburg, Pennsylvania. The studios were in Lemoyne on the second floor of the Lemoyne Theatre building in the 300 block of Market Street.

WCMB was founded by Edgar T. Shepard and Edgar K. "Ed" Smith under the Rossmoyne Corporation name. Smith served as the station manager for several decades. He was a lifelong resident of Harrisburg, beginning his career at WHP in the early 1930s.

WCMB moved to 1460 kHz in 1951 after WHP moved to 580 kHz. (WHP had been on 1460 kHz for ten years after the NARBA alignment.) WHP and WCMB had no formal association until the 1990s after Dame Media purchased both stations.

Rossmoyne added a television station, WCMB-TV, in 1954. It was the original channel 27 in Harrisburg. WTPA was on channel 71 at the time, starting in July 1953. WCMB-TV was an affiliate of the DuMont Television Network. The station failed in April 1957 (per station records) after DuMont "went dark", leaving channel 27 open for WTPA to take over on June 1, 1957.

WCMB-FM (on 99.3 MHz) launched in 1965 (per station records). It is presently WHKF.

The station was purchased by Dame Media in 1997 and the land at the transmitter site was sold to its next door neighbor Harsco. After a period of low power operation from 2001 to 2004, WTKT duplexed on the WKBO tower at the Harrisburg water plant, a new transmitter site was constructed in Summerdale. The station signed on from this site in July 2004.

== Programming ==
For most of its early history, the station had a MOR format with local news, current events and public interest programming. When Barnstable Broadcasting owned it, the format was a hybrid news/sports talk.

After Dame Media acquired the station in 1997, more sports talk was added. Finally, Clear Channel changed the call letters to WTKT and made the format all Sports talk in 2000.

Currently, the station's programming consists of the American Hockey League's Hershey Bears, local high school football coverage, Saturday Sports Jam with Jed Donahue, and syndicated Fox Sports Radio.

=== High school football ===
In the 2005 high school football season, 1460 the Ticket announced they would be the home for Cumberland Valley Eagles High School Football. In 2006, the Ticket also began carrying Bishop McDevitt Crusaders Football, carrying their home and playoff games.
