= Regions of Pennsylvania =

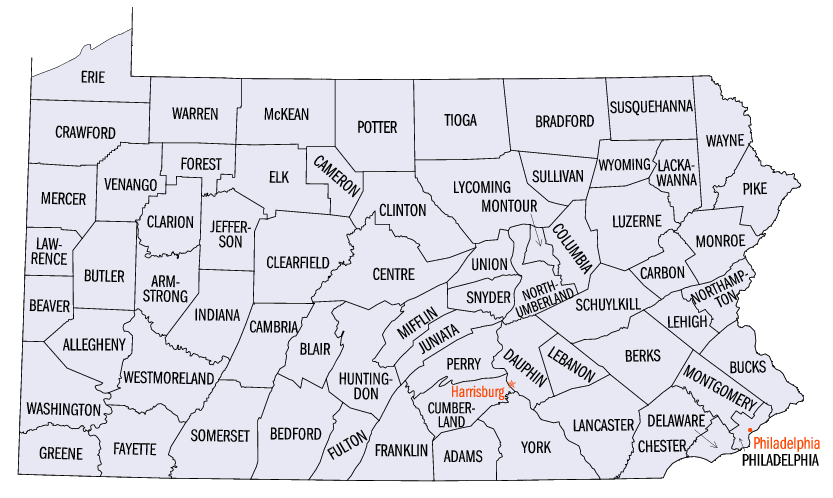
Map of Pennsylvania's 67 counties

Pennsylvania is the fifth-most populous state in the United States. Regions of Pennsylvania include:

== Lehigh Valley ==
The Lehigh Valley, located in eastern Pennsylvania, is named for the Lehigh River, which flows through it. It is the state's third-most populous metropolitan statistical area after the Philadelphia metropolitan area and Greater Pittsburgh. The Lehigh Valley's most populous city, Allentown, is the third-most populous city in Pennsylvania and was an center for the nation's industrialization in the 19th and 20th centuries. In the late 20th century, however, the city and region began experiencing deindustrialization and an economic downturn in its heavy manufacturing sector. In the early 21st century, its economy diversified considerably, and it is now one of the fastest growing metropolitan regions in the state. In addition to Allentown, the Lehigh Valley's two next most populous cities are Bethlehem and Easton, and the region has extensive suburban communities surrounding these three primary cities. The region was once a hub for American heavy manufacturing. It has one of the state's fastest growing populations. The Lehigh Valley includes two eastern Pennsylvania counties:

- Lehigh County
- Northampton County
- Population (2020): 687,508

== Southeastern Pennsylvania ==
=== Delaware Valley ===
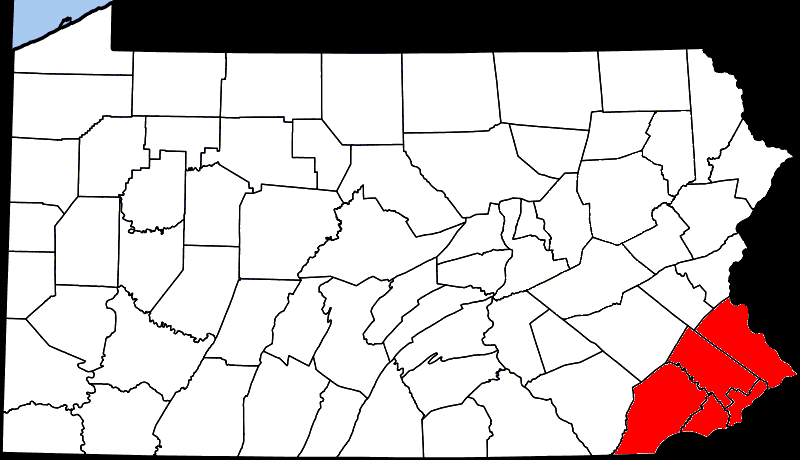
Counties in the Delaware Valley region of Pennsylvania

The Delaware Valley, the state's most populous region, is named for the Delaware River, which flows through the region. It includes five Pennsylvania counties:

- Bucks
- Chester
- Delaware
- Montgomery
- Philadelphia
- Population (2020): 6.245 million The Delaware Valley is centered around Philadelphia, the largest city in Pennsylvania and sixth-largest city in the nation.

=== Pennsylvania Piedmont ===
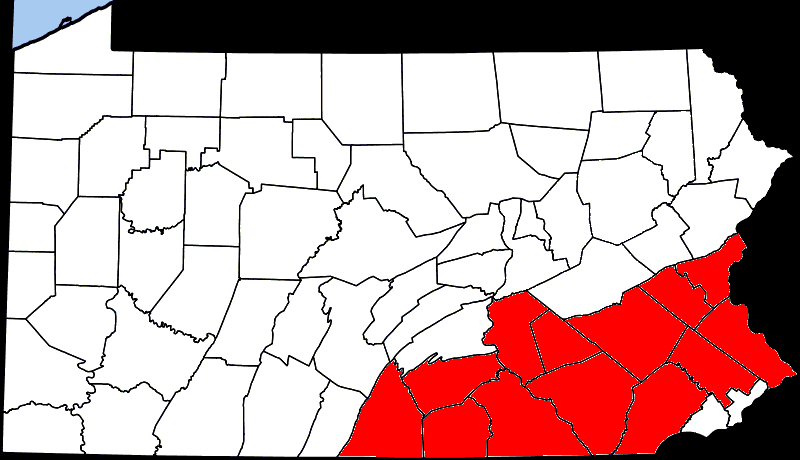
Counties in Pennsylvania's Piedmont Plateau

Pennsylvania's Piedmont region is a heavily agricultural section of the Piedmont Plateau. It consists of the following seven Pennsylvania counties:

- Adams
- Cumberland
- Dauphin
- Franklin
- Lancaster
- Lebanon
- York

=== Pennsylvania Dutch Country ===
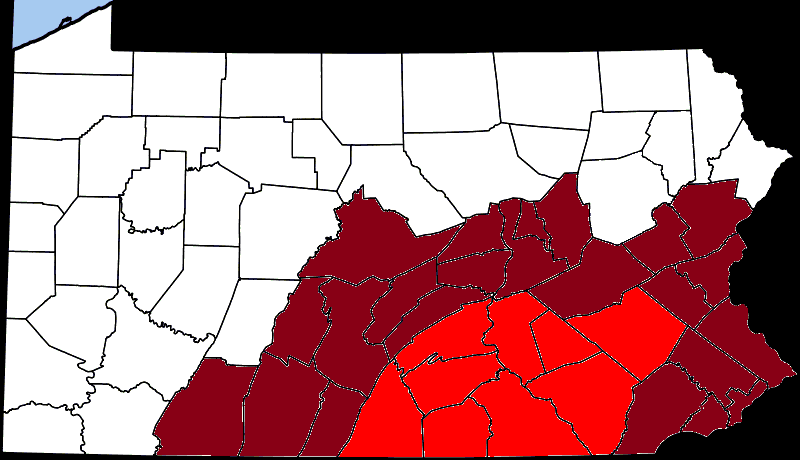
Counties constituting the Pennsylvania Dutch Country Region

Pennsylvania Dutch Country refers to an area of Pennsylvania, which has a high percentage of Amish, Mennonite, and "Fancy Dutch" residents. The Pennsylvania Dutch language was historically common, and is still spoken today by many Amish people residing in the state.

It consists of the following counties:

- York
- Perry
- Berks
- Cumberland
- Adams
- Lebanon
- Franklin
- Lancaster

== Northeastern Pennsylvania ==
=== Northeastern Pennsylvania ===
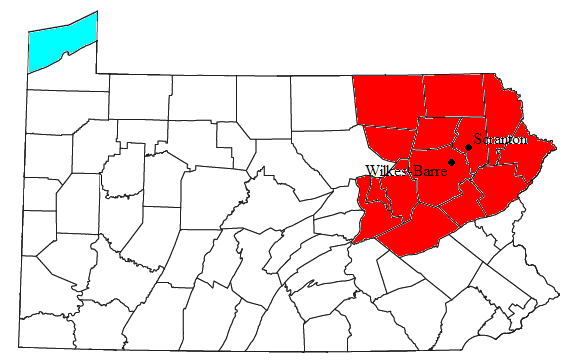
Counties constituting Northeastern Pennsylvania

This mountainous area of Pennsylvania includes the Pocono Mountains, the Endless Mountains, and former anthracite coal mining cities, boroughs, and villages.

Northeastern Pennsylvania consists of the following 14 counties:

- Bradford County
- Carbon County
- Columbia County
- Lackawanna County
- Luzerne County
- Monroe County
- Montour County
- Northumberland County
- Pike County
- Schuylkill County
- Sullivan County
- Susquehanna County
- Wayne County
- Wyoming County

=== Poconos ===
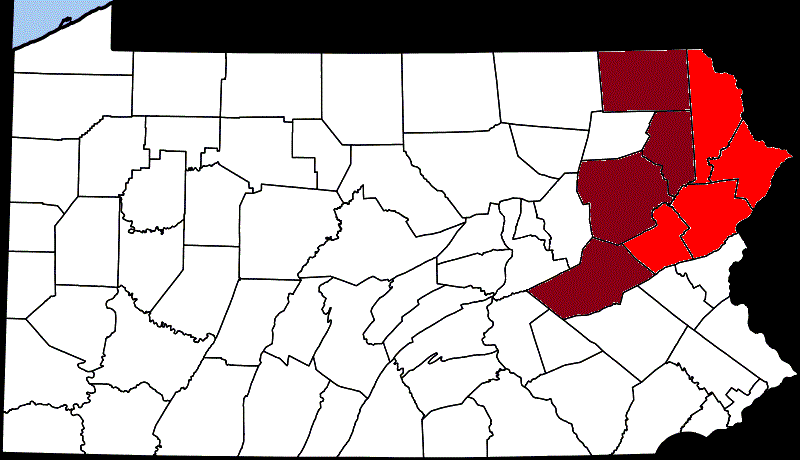
Counties constituting The Poconos

The Poconos, or the Pocono Mountains region, is a mountainous region of about 2,400 square miles (6,200 km^{2}) located in Northeastern Pennsylvania, approximately 30 miles north of Allentown, which is a nationally popular recreational winter destination for skiing, snowboarding, and other winter sports and (in off-season months) for hiking, kayaking, tubing, and other recreational activities.

The region consists of the following four Pennsylvania counties:

- Carbon
- Monroe
- Pike
- Wayne

=== Coal Region ===
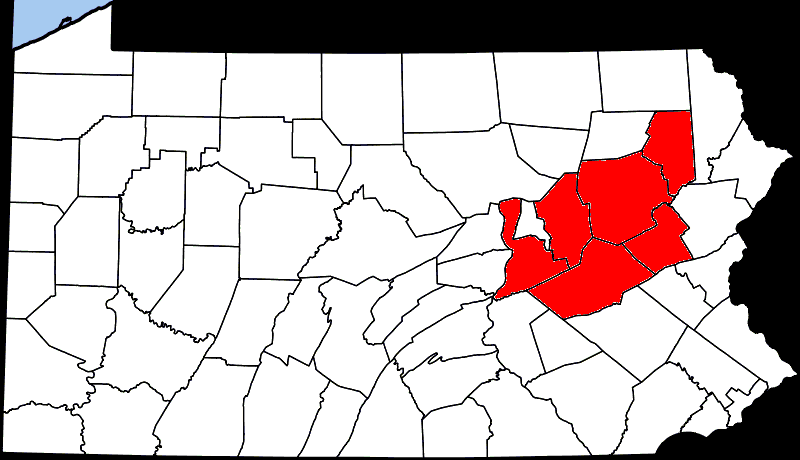
Counties constituting the Coal Region of Pennsylvania

The Coal Region is a term used to refer to an area of Northeastern Pennsylvania in the central Appalachian Mountains. The region is home to the largest known deposits of anthracite coal in the world with an estimated reserve of seven billion tons.

- Schuylkill
- Carbon
- Northumberland
- Columbia
- Luzerne
- Lackawanna

=== Wyoming Valley ===
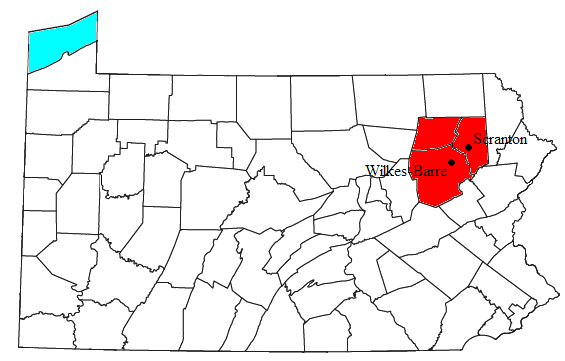
Counties constituting the Wyoming Valley Region of Pennsylvania

Wyoming Valley is a region of Northeastern Pennsylvania shaped like a crescent and part of the ridge-and-valley or folded Appalachians, which includes the metropolitan areas of Scranton and Wilkes-Barre.

Consisting of the following counties:

- Luzerne
- Lackawanna
- Wyoming

=== Endless Mountains ===
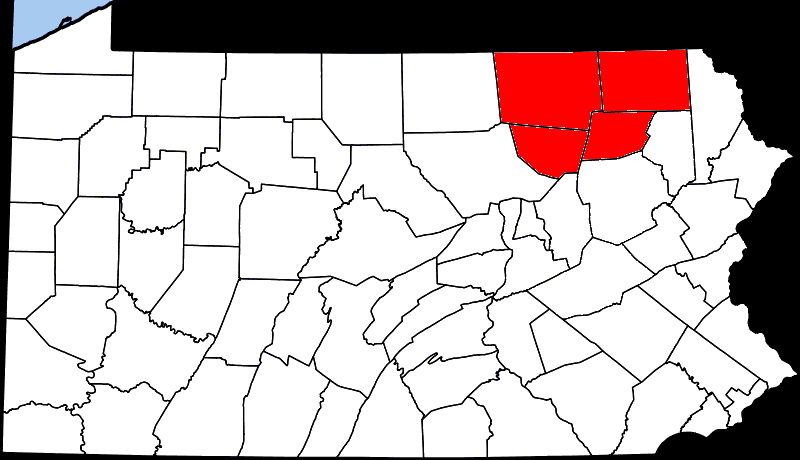
Counties constituting the Endless Mountains Region of Pennsylvania

The Endless Mountains are a chain of mountains in Northeastern Pennsylvania that are part of the Appalachian Mountains chain. The mountains are not true mountains, geologically speaking, but are a dissected plateau and part of the Allegheny Plateau, along with the higher Catskill Mountains to the east of the Endless Mountains in New York state.

Consisting of the following counties:

- Sullivan
- Wyoming
- Bradford
- Susquehanna

=== Northern Tier ===
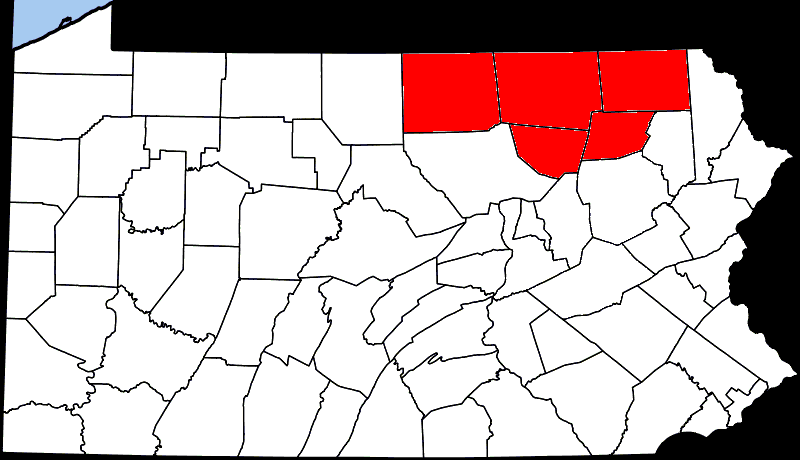
Counties constituting the Northern Tier Region of Pennsylvania

The Northern Tier is a geographic region in Northeastern Pennsylvania.

Consisting of the following counties:

- Sullivan
- Wyoming
- Bradford
- Susquehanna
- Tioga
- Potter
- McKean

== Central Pennsylvania ==
=== Susquehanna River Valley ===
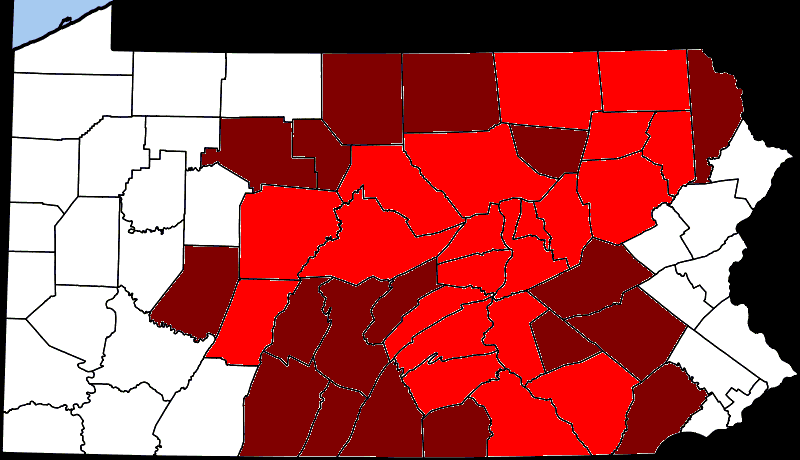
Counties constituting the Susquehanna Valley Region

The Susquehanna River is a river in the Northeastern United States. At approximately 410 mi (715 km) in length, it is the longest river on the East Coast.

=== South Central Pennsylvania ===
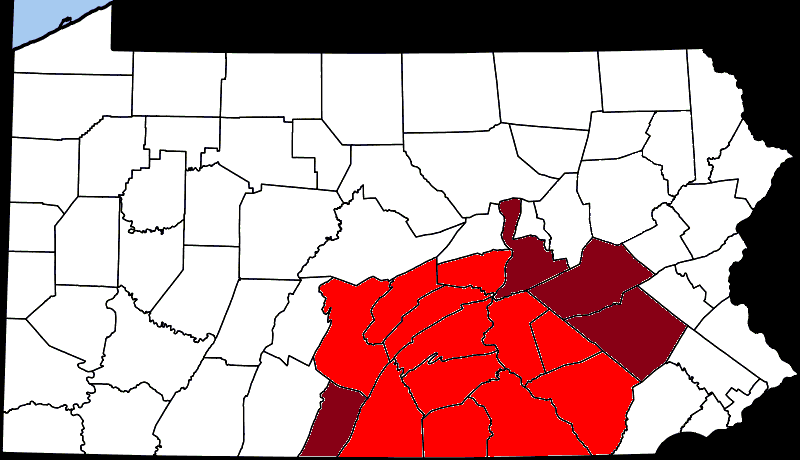
Counties constituting the South Central Pennsylvania Region

South Central Pennsylvania is often referred to as some combination of the following counties:

- Adams
- Cumberland
- Dauphin
- Franklin
- Huntingdon
- Juniata
- Lancaster
- Lebanon
- Mifflin
- Perry
- Snyder
- York

The following counties are less frequently included in the description of the region:

- Schuylkill
- Berks
- Northumberland
- Fulton

=== Southern Alleghenies (West Central) ===
Counties constituting the Southern Alleghenies region of Pennsylvania

Southern Alleghenies is a geographic region of West Central Pennsylvania, consisting of the following counties:

- Bedford
- Blair
- Cambria
- Fulton
- Huntingdon
- Somerset

=== Happy Valley ===
Counties constituting the Happy Valley Region of Pennsylvania

Happy Valley is a large valley located in central Pennsylvania. Pennsylvania State University is located in the valley.

Consisting of the following county:

- Centre

=== Cumberland Valley ===
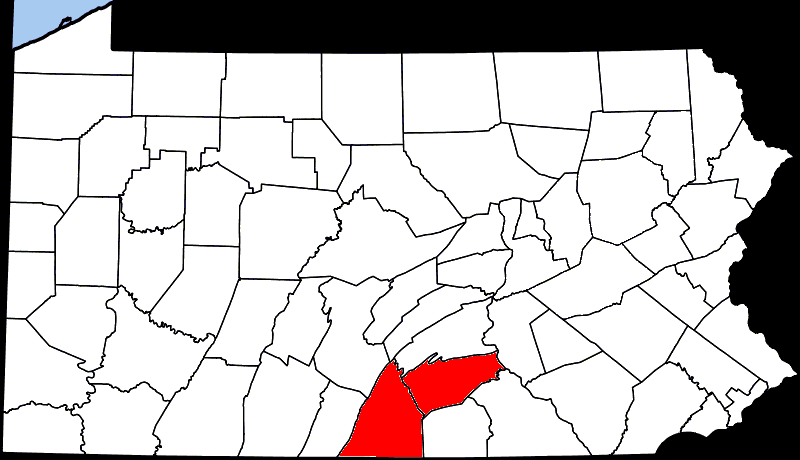
Counties constituting the Cumberland Valley Region of Pennsylvania

Cumberland Valley is a geographic region that lies between South Mountain and Blue Ridge Mountains of Central Pennsylvania and Western Maryland.

Consisting of the following counties:

- Cumberland
- Franklin

== Western Pennsylvania ==
=== Laurel Highlands ===
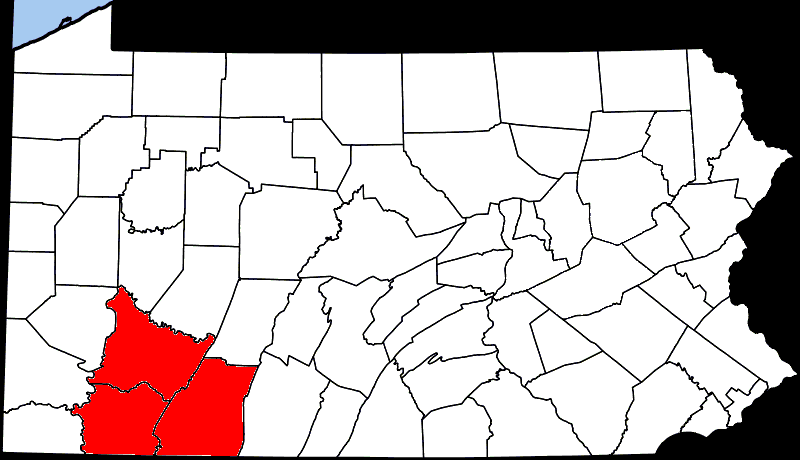
Counties constituting the Laurel Highlands Region of Pennsylvania

The Laurel Highlands, in the southwestern part of the state of Pennsylvania, traverses the Laurel and Chestnut ridges of the Allegheny Mountains.

Consisting of the following counties:

- Fayette
- Somerset
- Cambria
- Westmoreland

=== Greater Pittsburgh ===
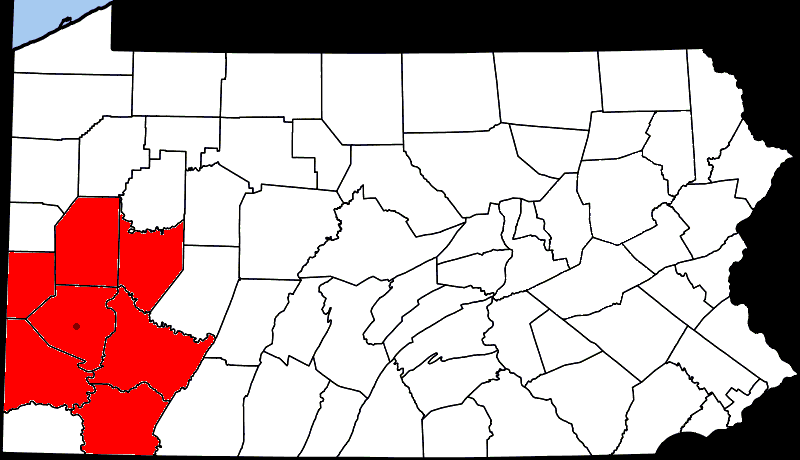
Counties constituting the Greater Pittsburgh metropolitan area

Also known as Southwestern Pennsylvania, the region consists of the following counties:

- Allegheny
- Armstrong
- Beaver
- Butler
- Washington
- Westmoreland
- Fayette

=== Allegheny National Forest ===
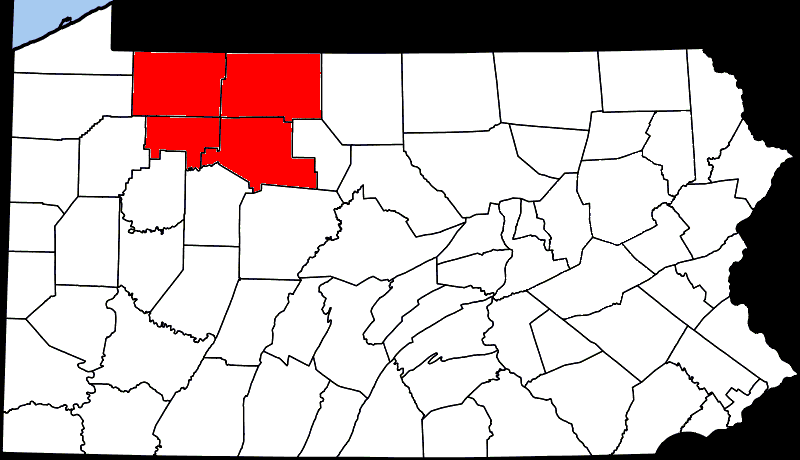
Counties constituting the Allegheny National Forest Region of Pennsylvania

The Allegheny National Forest is a National Forest located in northwestern Pennsylvania. The forest covers over 500,000 acres (2,000 km^{2}) of land.

Consisting of the following counties:

- Forest
- Elk
- Warren
- McKean

=== Northwestern Pennsylvania ===
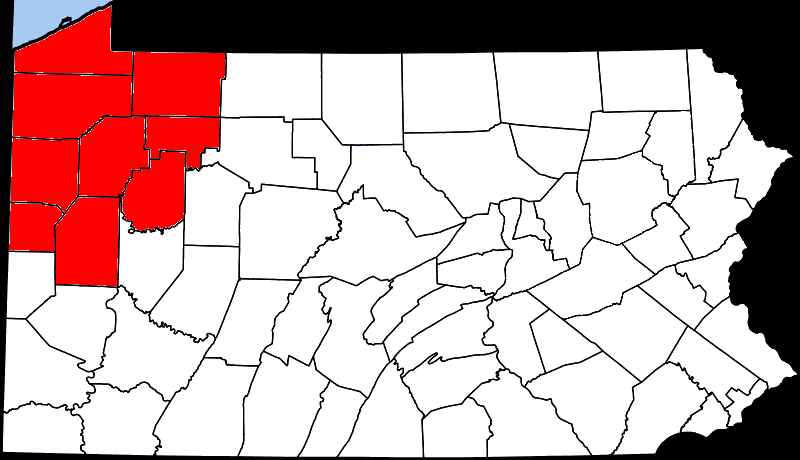
Counties constituting Northwestern Pennsylvania

- Erie
- Crawford
- Mercer
- Venango
- Warren
- Lawrence
- Butler
- Clarion
- Forest
