= WCDM =

Radio station in Hershey, Pennsylvania

- Hershey, Pennsylvania; United States
- Broadcast area: South Central Pennsylvania
- Frequency: 106.7 MHz (HD Radio)

Programming
- Format: Christian adult contemporary
- Network: Family Life Network

Ownership
- Owner: Family Life Network; (Family Life Ministries, Inc.)
- Sister stations: WCDF; WCDI

History
- First air date: April 30, 1964
- Former call signs: WMSH-FM (1964–1969); WEPN-FM (1969–1971); WPDC-FM (1971–1980); WRKZ (1980–2002); WCAT-FM (2002–2004); WCPP (2004–2005); WMHX (2005–2012); WZCY-FM (2012–2018); WWKL (2018–2026)
- Call sign meaning: With Christ Discover Mercy

Technical information
- Licensing authority: FCC
- Facility ID: 64842
- Class: B
- ERP: 14,000 watts
- HAAT: 283 meters (928 ft)
- Transmitter coordinates: 40°10′16.3″N 76°35′48.8″W

Links
- Public license information: Public file; LMS
- Website: www.familylife.org

WCDM (106.7 FM) is a non-commercial radio station licensed to Hershey, Pennsylvania, and serving South Central Pennsylvania. The station is owned by the Family Life Network, broadcasting a Christian adult contemporary format, and broadcasts from a transmitter on Tower Road in Elizabethtown.

== History ==
=== Early years ===
The station signed on the air on April 13, 1964. Its original call sign was WMSH-FM and it was based in Elizabethtown. WMSH was the sister station to an WEZN (1600 AM).

FM 106.7 became WEPN-FM in 1969 and then WPDC-FM in 1971. In 1980, it switched its call letters to WRKZ and branded as "Z107" with a country music format. The city of license was moved to Hershey and the power was boosted.

In 2002, call letters were changed to WCAT-FM and the station was re-branded as Cat Country 106.7. The WRKZ call letters were moved to 102.3 FM in Carlisle and the two stations began a simulcast.

=== Cool Pop ===
On February 19, 2004, the station changed its call sign to WCPP and rebranded as Coolpop. This was after over 24 hours of stunting by playing "Pop Goes the Weasel" on a continuous loop. Many rumors circulated, trying to explain the loop. There were even rumors of a staff member taking hostages and locking him/herself in the studio and repeatedly playing the song. This proved false when a Top 40 (CHR) format was launched with "Hey Ya!" by Outkast.

The original air staff of Coolpop included only one live show, "Michelle & Mitchell" in the morning. The midday and afternoon shifts were voicetracked by DJs from sister station WNTQ 93Q in Syracuse, New York. By Spring 2004, a full line up of live local talent was hired. Sarah Vaughn on middays and Justin Louis on afternoons were added, along with the live Michelle & Mitchell morning show.

Coolpop was marketed as "The World's First Coolpop Station", mixing a standard CHR format with some 1970s and 1980s "Cassette Classics" (later renamed "Coolpop Classics").

Coolpop also alternated theme weekends every other weekend. Some theme weekends included "One Hit Wonders", "Diva Doubleplays", "Coolpop Classics", and the popular 1970s-themed "Studio 106.7".

In early fall 2004, Michelle & Mitchell were replaced with Ed Coffey and Amy Warner. They had been hosts of a long running morning show from Harrisburg's WTPA-FM. The pair had been fired from that station earlier in the summer.

=== Adult hits and Gen X ===
On July 1, 2005, Coolpop was suddenly replaced with an adult hits format branded as Mix 106.7.

On April 9, 2010, Mix 106.7 was flipped to Channel 106.7, and was reformatted with a 1980s and 1990s hits/Gen X format.

Citadel Broadcasting merged with Cumulus Media on September 16, 2011.

=== Z Country and Nash-FM ===
The Gen X format was dropped on January 20, 2012, at 1:06 p.m. At that point, the station became WZCY-FM "Z Country 106.7". The last song on Channel 106.7 was Bye Bye Bye by *NSYNC, and the first song on Z Country 106.7 was This Is Country Music by Brad Paisley.

On February 3, 2014, at 12 pm, WZCY-FM, along with nine other Cumulus-owned country music stations, made the switch to "Nash FM" branding as Nash FM 106.7. The final song on Z Country 106.7 was Prayin' for Daylight by Rascal Flatts, while the first song on Nash FM 106.7 was How Country Feels by Randy Houser.

=== Top 40 and rhythmic contemporary ===
On March 15, 2018, at 2 pm, WZCY-FM flipped back to contemporary hit radio as "HOT 106.7". This was part of a format swap with WWKL "HOT 93.5" which concurrently took on the Nash FM branding and a gold-based country format. The last song on "HOT 93.5" was "Young Dumb & Broke" by Khalid, while the first song on "HOT 106.7" was "Finesse" by Bruno Mars and Cardi B.

This move was intended to reduce signal overlap and redundancy with co-owned country station WIOV-FM 105.1 in Ephrata. WIOV-FM serves the Lancaster, York, and Reading metropolitan areas. The stronger signal on 106.7 was thought to be more competitive with iHeartMedia's competing Top 40 outlet WHKF in Harrisburg. iHeartMedia subsequently responded by flipping WHKF to alternative rock and redirecting its listeners to sister station WLAN-FM 96.9 in Lancaster. WLAN-FM similarly pivoted to serving the entire South Central Pennsylvania media market. It took advantage of WWKL's sister station 105.7 WQXA's decision to shift from alternative rock to Mainstream Rock after WTPA (92.1 FM) was sold to the Educational Media Foundation and flipped to K-Love in January 2018.

In April 2024, WWKL shifted its format from Top 40/CHR to rhythmic contemporary to compete closer with urban-formatted WHKF. It continues to call itself "HOT 106.7."

=== Sale to Family Life Ministries ===
On June 30, 2026, Cumulus Media announced that it would sell WWKL and WLLF in Youngstown, Ohio, to Family Life Ministries for $2.25 million dollars, a sale that resulted in the end of the rhythmic CHR format on the frequency, as Family Life focuses on their Christian AC-formatted Family Life Network.

On July 23, 2026, following the announcement of the sale, Cumulus began promoting a move of the HOT branding to translator W243BR (96.5 FM) in Harrisburg, which previously relayed WHGB. The translator is fed by 93.5 WTPA-FM's HD2 subchannel. The move marked the fourth FM frequency to carry the HOT brand in the Harrisburg market, following 92.1, 93.5, and 106.7.

On August 26, 2026, at approximately 9:02 p.m., midway through "Ever Since U Left Me (I Went Deaf)" by French Montana & Max B, WWKL flipped from rhythmic contemporary "HOT 106.7" to the Family Life Network, where a partial station identification followed. The call sign was changed to WCDM on September 18, 2026.

== Signal note ==
WCDM is short-spaced to four other Class B stations: WJFK-FM 106.7 The Fan (licensed to serve Manassas, Virginia), WWMX Mix 106.5 (licensed to serve Baltimore, Maryland), WCFT-FM Bigfoot Country (licensed to serve Bloomsburg, Pennsylvania), and WLTW 106.7 Lite FM (licensed to serve New York City).

WJFK-FM and WLTW both operate on the same channel as WCDM. The distance between WCDM's transmitter and WJFK-FM's transmitter is 96 miles (154 km), while the distance between WCDM's transmitter and WLTW's transmitter is 142 miles (229 km), as determined by FCC rules. The minimum distance between two Class B stations operating on the same channel according to current FCC rules is 150 miles (240 km).

WWMX and WCFT-FM both operate on 106.5 MHz, a first adjacent channel to WCDM. The distance between WCDM's transmitter and WWMX's transmitter is 58 miles (93 km), while the distance between WCDM's transmitter and WCFT-FM's transmitter is 61 miles (98 km), as determined by FCC rules. The minimum distance between two Class B stations operating on first adjacent channels according to current FCC rules is 105 miles (169 km).
