= WTPA =

WTPA may refer to:

- WTPA (AM), a radio station (980 AM) licensed to serve Pompano Beach, Florida, United States
- WTPA-FM, a radio station (93.5) licensed to serve Mechanicsburg, Pennsylvania, which also held the call sign WTPA-FM from 1985 to 1986 and WTPA from 1986 to 2011
- WHOT (AM), a radio station (1590 AM) licensed to serve Palm River-Clair Mel, Florida, United States, which held the call sign WTPA from 2019 to 2021
- WNUZ-LP, a low-power radio station (92.9 FM) licensed to serve Gap, Pennsylvania, United States, which held the call sign WTPA-LP in 2018
- WKHL (FM), a radio station (92.1) licensed to serve Palmyra, Pennsylvania, which held the call sign WTPA from 2011 to 2018
- WNNK-FM, a radio station (104.1) licensed to serve Harrisburg, Pennsylvania, which held the call sign WTPA-FM from 1962 to 1985
- WHTM-TV, a television station (PSIP 27/RF10) licensed to serve Harrisburg, Pennsylvania, which held the call sign WTPA from 1953 to 1980

WTPA could be an abbreviation for:

- West Tennessee Physicians' Alliance
- West Tennessee Paintball Association
- West Texas Press Association
- We the People Act
- Wireless Telephone Protection Act of 1998
- Wisconsin Tractor Pullers Association
