= WZCY =

WZCY may refer to:

- WTPA-FM, a radio station (93.5 FM) licensed to serve Mechanicsburg, Pennsylvania, United States, which held the call sign WZCY-FM from 2018 to 2021
- WWKL (FM), a radio station (106.7 FM) licensed to serve Hershey, Pennsylvania, which held the call sign WZCY-FM from 2012 to 2018
