= WBWX =

Simulcasting WHLM Bloomsburg
- Berwick, Pennsylvania; United States
- Broadcast area: Berwick/Bloomsburg
- Frequency: 1280 kHz

Programming
- Format: stunting
- Affiliations: Compass Media Networks

Ownership
- Owner: Seven Mountains Media; (Southern Belle, LLC)
- Sister stations: WHLM

History
- First air date: August 11, 1957
- Former call signs: WBRX (1957–1987); WSQV (1987–2000); WFBS (2000–2011)

Technical information
- Licensing authority: FCC
- Facility ID: 27001
- Class: D
- Power: 1,000 watts day 164 watts night
- Transmitter coordinates: 41.078664°N 76.259612°W
- Translator: 96.3 W242CY (Berwick)

Links
- Public license information: Public file; LMS
- Webcast: Listen Live
- Website: ThisIsPopRadio.com

WBWX (1280 AM) is a radio station licensed to the U.S. city of Berwick, Pennsylvania and serves the immediate Berwick/Bloomsburg radio market. The station broadcasts at a frequency of 1280 kHz with 1,000 watts daytime, and 164 watts nighttime with a non-directional signal pattern.

Until 2022, the station was owned by the Columbia Broadcasting Company which also owned WHLM. The station currently simulcasts the programming heard on WHLM and is operated out of studios in Selinsgrove, Pennsylvania.

== History ==
WBWX first signed on the air on August 11, 1957, as WBRX, with its license granted to Columbia County Broadcasters, Inc. on November 4, 1957.

As WSQV, the station held a contemporary Christian/religious format and eventually went silent under ownership of Heritage Broadcasting, Inc.

The station was purchased by Kevin Fennessy and on April 1, 2000, the station relaunched as "WFBS Radio Smiles", with a format of early 60s music.

WFBS was purchased by Bold Gold Media Group in 2007, and under their ownership, the station aired a simulcast of all-sports network "The Game", which was also heard on WYCK, WICK, and WPSN.

In 2011, WFBS was purchased by the Columbia Broadcasting Company, which owns WHLM in Bloomsburg. The callsign was changed to WBWX (as a nod to the former WBRX), and changed formats to a simulcast of its new sister station WHLM-AM. During high school football season, WBWX will split from its regular simulcast of WHLM-AM and air Berwick football.

On March 21, 2022, the Press Enterprise reported that owner Joe Reilly would sell the entirety of the Columbia Broadcasting Company to Seven Mountains Media for $450,000. The sale did not include the stations' studios location.

The sale closed on August 31 of that year; owner and morning DJ Joe Reilly would retire after his show that morning, voluntarily ending a radio career spanning over 50 years. Just after 1 p.m. on September 1, the classic hits format would sign off, with Billy Joel's "Movin' Out (Anthony's Song)" and Supertramp's "Goodbye Stranger" as the final two songs played. The final Fox News Radio update ran at the top of the hour, followed by about two hours of dead air. Shortly after 3 p.m., the entire Columbia cluster of stations would begin stunting with a loop of "Pop" by NSYNC, while redirecting former WHLM listeners to the duo of WHNA/WNNA and promoting a new format to debut the following Tuesday, September 6, at 10 a.m. At that time, WBWX/WHLM flipped to hot adult contemporary as "Pop Radio".

On September 29, 2025 at Midnight, after signing off the "Pop!" format with an hour of departure-themed songs (ending with "See You Again" by Wiz Khalifa), WHLM and WBWX began stunting with another song loop, this time of "Changes" by David Bowie, promoting a change to occur the following Wednesday, October 1, at 10 a.m.

== Previous logos ==
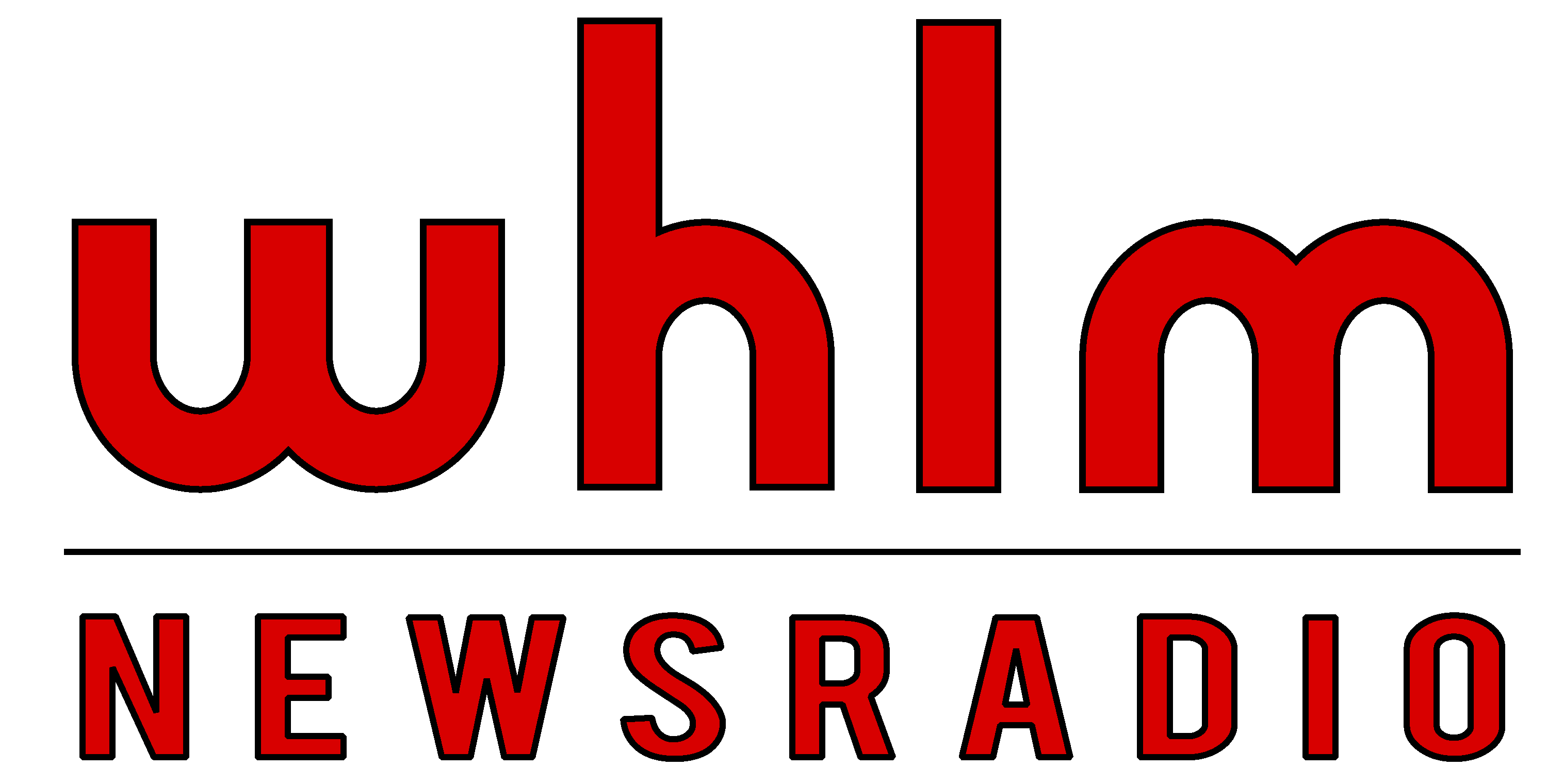
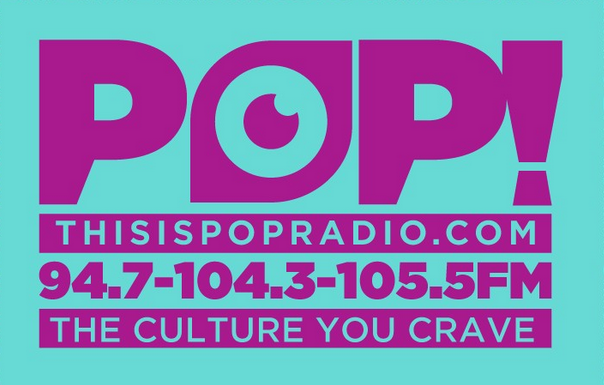
