= WLYC =

Radio station in Williamsport, Pennsylvania

Simulcasting WHLM Bloomsburg
- Williamsport, Pennsylvania; United States
- Frequency: 1050 kHz
- Branding: The Goat 102-104-107

Programming
- Format: Classic rock
- Affiliations: Compass Media Networks

Ownership
- Owner: Seven Mountains Media; (Southern Belle, LLC)
- Sister stations: WEJS

History
- First air date: 1951

Technical information
- Licensing authority: FCC
- Facility ID: 52187
- Class: D
- Power: 1,000 watts day; 30 watts night
- Transmitter coordinates: 41°15′44.00″N 77°1′59.00″W
- Translators: 92.7 W224AI (Loyalsock); 93.7 W281AR (Williamsport); 102.3 W272ED (Lewisburg); 107.5 W298DJ (Muncy)

Links
- Public license information: Public file; LMS
- Webcast: Listen live
- Website: goatrockspa.com

WLYC (1050 AM) is a classic rock music formatted radio station in Williamsport, Pennsylvania, United States. The station is owned by Seven Mountains Media, through licensee Southern Belle, LLC, and is operated out of studios in Selinsgrove, Pennsylvania. The station previously operated in simulcast with sister stations WRBG, and WCFT-FM. Although also owned by Seven Mountains Media, WLYC and its other simulcasting frequencies feature different programming than WIBF and WDBF, which are also branded as Bigfoot Country.

== History ==
WLYC had been Williamsport's all-sports radio station since January 1, 2005, and carried local sports talk (The Locker Room from 4pm-5pm), and Jed Donahue from 5pm-7pm. The remainder of WLYC's schedule came from a satellite feed.

WLYC was the flagship station for athletic programs at Lycoming College and the Pennsylvania College of Technology, as well as Williamsport Crosscutters Baseball and in-game reports from the Little League World Series. WLYC also served as an affiliate of the Mansfield University Mountaineer Sports Network. Previously, WLYC served as the flagship station and network coordinator for Lock Haven University athletics.

WLYC was also the flagship (online) station for athletic programs at Wilkes University and Misericordia University.

WLYC has seen a variety of formats through the years; it has been an Adult Contemporary/Adult Standards station (2002–2004); a talk station (1999–2002) during which the nationally syndicated Travel World Radio Show was its highest-rated program; Classic Country (1997–1999); Music of Your Life station (1972–1997); and Top 40, along with various other formats prior to that.

Mike Yoder was the morning show host for 13 years. Other disc jockeys have included Lou Kolb, Vanessa Hunter, Kelly Watts (3 different times), Sam Jordan, Dr. Jay Richards and Dee Clark.

Prior to September 2010, a consortium of Jeff Andrulonis, Daniel Klingerman and Larry Allison, Jr. owned the station and operated it as a subsidiary of Andrulonis's Colonial Radio Group. Andrulonis sold his stake in the station in September 2010 but allowed the other partners to continue using the Colonial name. Klingerman and Allison, in turn, sold the station to Todd Bartley, its longtime general manager, in late 2013, continuing to use the Colonial name in its ownership moniker.

On May 18, 2016, the Court of Common Pleas of Lycoming County issued an Order granting a motion by First Citizens Community Bank that a Receiver be appointed to take control of the radio stations and assets of Colonial Radio Group of Williamsport, LLC and to facilitate the sale of the stations and pay the proceeds to the bank.

On March 1, 2017, WLYC switched affiliations from ESPN Radio to Fox Sports Radio.

In July 2017, WLYC ceased its simulcast on its sister-station WEJS as the result of a format change, but continued to air its programming on 1050 AM and 92.7 FM.

On April 8, 2020, Terry Ginn, Receiver, filed an application on FCC form 316 for the involuntary assignment of license of the stations pursuant to the Court of Common Pleas’ Order of January 15, 2019 due to the current owner's refusal to sign any Asset Purchase Agreement for the stations or otherwise cooperate in the sale of the station to the prospective purchaser.

On May 16, 2020, WLYC was taken silent by Terry Ginn, the court appointed receiver of the previous licensee while the receiver and the prospective buyer negotiates an asset purchase agreement and files for the assignment of the station. The station is to return to operation after the consummation of the assignment of the station by the prospective new licensee.

On May 29, 2020, an asset purchase agreement for WLYC, sister-station WEJS, and associated translators between Terry Ginn, Receiver and Seven Mountains Media, LLC & Southern Belle, LLC was filed with the FCC with a closing date within 15 business days after the final order has occurred. The purchase was consummated on October 5, 2020, at a price of $100,000.

On March 20, 2021, the station was returned to the air, operating in simulcast with sister stations WRBG, WQBG, and WCFT-FM.

On February 1, 2022 WLYC split from its simulcast with WRBG, WQBG and WCFT-FM and changed their format to classic country, branded as "Bigfoot Legends".

On October 1, 2025, WLYC changed their format from classic country to a simulcast of classic rock-formatted WHLM 930 AM Bloomsburg, branded as "The Goat".

== FM translators ==
WLYC programming is relayed to four FM translators in order to widen the coverage area, especially at night when WLYC reduces power to only 30 watts. The 104.1 translator previously rebroadcast WEJS, but went silent on May 16, 2020. The station returned to the air, rebroadcasting WLYC on March 20, 2021.

Broadcast translators for WLYC
Call sign	Frequency	City of license	FID	ERP (W)	Class	FCC info
W224AI	92.7 FM	Loyalsock, Pennsylvania	36238	20	D	LMS
W272ED	102.3 FM	New Columbia, Pennsylvania	200488	5	D	LMS
W281AR	93.7 FM	Williamsport, Pennsylvania	141440	250	D	LMS
W298DJ	107.5 FM	Muncy, Pennsylvania	146389	250	D	LMS

== Previous logos ==
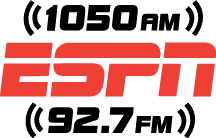
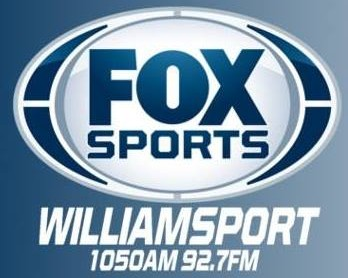
