= WYGL =

WYGL may refer to:

- WCDI, a radio station (100.5 FM) licensed to serve Elizabethville, Pennsylvania, United States, which held the call sign WYGL-FM from 1990 to 2016
- WVSL (defunct), a radio station (1240 AM) licensed to serve Selinsgrove, Pennsylvania, which held the call sign WYGL from 1984 to 2011
