= WHLM (AM) =

Radio station in Bloomsburg, Pennsylvania

- Bloomsburg, Pennsylvania; United States
- Frequency: 930 kHz
- Branding: The Goat 102-104-107

Programming
- Format: Classic rock
- Affiliations: Compass Media Networks

Ownership
- Owner: Seven Mountains Media; (Southern Belle, LLC)
- Sister stations: WBWX

History
- First air date: 1947 (as WCNR)
- Former call signs: WCNR (1947–2001)
- Call sign meaning: Harry L. Magee

Technical information
- Licensing authority: FCC
- Facility ID: 12465
- Class: D
- Power: 2,000 watts days; 18 watts nights
- Transmitter coordinates: 41°1′0.00″N 76°27′44.00″W
- Translators: 104.3 W282CO (Bloomsburg); 105.5 W288CF (Danville); 107.1 W296CD (Jonestown)
- Repeater: 1050 WLYC (Williamsport)

Links
- Public license information: Public file; LMS
- Webcast: Listen Live
- Website: goatrockspa.com

WHLM (930 kHz) is a commercial radio station in Bloomsburg, Pennsylvania, and owned by Seven Mountains Media. WHLM is simulcast on WLYC 1050 AM Williamsport.

WHLM is a Class D station. By day, it is powered at 2,000 watts. But to avoid interference with other stations on 930 AM, WHLM reduces power at night to only 18 watts. The transmitter tower is on Arbutus Park Road in Bloomsburg. Programming is also heard on three FM translators: 104.3 in Bloomsburg, 105.5 in Danville and 107.1 in Jonestown.

== History ==
=== AM 930 and 690 ===
In the fall of 1947, two new radio stations signed on the air in Bloomsburg. One was owned by the Morning Press newspaper (now the Press Enterprise), 930 WCNR. And one was owned by a group of local business leaders, 690 WLTR. In September 1951, Harry L. Magee of Magee Industrial Enterprises changed the 690 call sign from WLTR to WHLM.

WHLM 690 was a daytimer station. It was required to go off the air at night to avoid interfering with clear channel station CBF in Montreal. In October 1953, WHLM moved to 550 AM. That put it on a full-time channel with WHLM becoming Bloomsburg's first 24-hour radio station.

In September 1956, Harry Magee built and signed on a sister station for WHLM. It was WHLM-FM at 106.5 MHz (now WFYY).

=== Changes in ownership ===
In 1966, the Morning Press sold WCNR to its station manager, Ed Darlington. Then in 1998, the Press Enterprise petitioned the Federal Communications Commission (FCC) for a waiver to buy back WCNR. At the time, the FCC discouraged newspapers from owning broadcast stations, concerned about one organization controlling too many media voices in a community.

In 1998, Magee Industrial Enterprises sold WHLM and WHLM-FM to the Sunbury Broadcasting Corporation. Under this ownership, the company shut down WHLM 550 AM. It later changed the WHLM-FM call sign to WFYY, standing for "Flight 106.5." The station was renamed "Y106.5", and later was known as "Bigfoot Country".

=== The New 930 WHLM ===
In April 2001, the Press Enterprise shut down WCNR. In September of that year, Joe Reilly formed the Columbia Broadcasting Company (not associated with CBS, which once called itself the Columbia Broadcasting System). The Columbia Broadcasting Company purchased the assets of WCNR from the Press Enterprise. The studios, offices and historic call sign were restored in the WHLM Building on the Square in Downtown Bloomsburg. The station signed back on as "The New 930 WHLM."

On March 21, 2022, the Press Enterprise reported that owner Joe Reilly (who also served as morning show disc jockey for the classic hits portion of the format) announced he would imminently retire and would sell the entirety of the Columbia Broadcasting Company; he chose to sell it to Seven Mountains Media for $450,000. The sale did not include the stations' studios or offices. The sale would make WHLM a sister station to WCFT-FM, which used to hold the WHLM call sign.

=== Seven Mountains ownership ===
The sale closed on August 31 of that year. Reilly announced he would retire after his show that morning; that move voluntarily ended a radio career spanning over 50 years. Just after 1 p.m. on September 1, the classic hits format played its last songs, Billy Joel's "Movin' Out (Anthony's Song)", Supertramp's "Goodbye Stranger", and Reunion's "Life Is a Rock (But the Radio Rolled Me)". The final Fox News Radio update ran at the top of the hour, followed by about two hours of dead air.

Shortly after 3 p.m., the entire Columbia cluster of stations began stunting with a loop of "Pop" by NSYNC. Between each airing, it redirected former WHLM listeners to two other stations, WHNA and WNNA. It was promoting a new format to debut the following Tuesday, September 6, at 10 a.m. At that time, WHLM/WBWX flipped to CHR - Top 40 as "Pop Radio", joining a network of stations ran by Seven Mountains operating under that format and brand.

On September 29, 2025 at Midnight, after signing off the "Pop!" format with an hour of departure-themed songs (ending with "See You Again" by Wiz Khalifa), WHLM and WBWX began stunting with another song loop, this time of "Changes" by David Bowie, promoting a change to occur the following Wednesday, October 1, at 10 a.m.

On October 1, 2025, at 10 a.m., WHLM ended stunting and launched a classic rock format, branded as "The Goat".

== Former logos ==
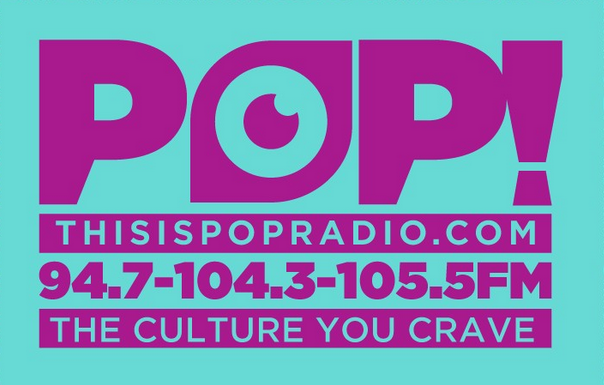
