= B98.3 =

B98.3 may refer to:

- WRBG (FM), the FM frequency of former B98.3 licensed to serve Mifflinburg, Pennsylvania, USA
- WQBG, the FM frequency of the former B98.3 licensed to serve Elizabethville, Pennsylvania, USA
