= WVSL =

WVSL may refer to:

- WVSL (AM), a radio station (1240 AM) licensed to serve Saranac Lake, New York, United States
- WHNA, a radio station (92.3 FM) licensed to serve Riverside, Pennsylvania, United States, which held the call sign WVSL-FM from 2011 to 2016
- WVSL (Pennsylvania), a defunct radio station (1240 AM) formerly licensed to serve Selinsgrove, Pennsylvania
