= Murder of Troy LaFerrara =

2013 criminal homicide in the U.S. state of Pennsylvania

Troy LaFerrara was a Port Trevorton, Pennsylvania man murdered on November 11, 2013. Miranda Barbour and her husband, Elytte Barbour, were found guilty and sentenced to life in prison in September 2014. The murder is notable because of the unsubstantiated claim by one of the killers, Miranda Barbour, that she had murdered at least 22 other people, triggering worldwide news coverage of the case. Barbour said all of her victims were “bad people,” so she feels no remorse in killing them. Elytte Barbour told investigators "that they committed the murder because they just wanted to murder someone together".

== Murder ==
The couple met Troy LaFerrara through an ad on Craigslist, where Miranda offered to have sex with him in exchange for payment. Elytte has publicly denied that Miranda is a sex worker. He said that she met men that paid her for "delightful conversation."

Miranda said she killed LaFerrara when he agreed to pay her $100 for sex. Barbour lied to him telling him she’d just turned 16.

On November 11, 2013, Miranda allegedly met LaFerrara at the Susquehanna Valley Mall parking lot in Hummels Wharf, Pennsylvania. After settling on payment, Miranda and LaFerrara then drove six miles to Sunbury, a small city located about 100 miles northwest of Philadelphia. Elytte Barbour told police that he hid under a blanket in the back seat waiting. After she allowed LaFerrara into her vehicle, Miranda signaled to Elytte, who jumped out and wrapped a cord around LaFerrara's neck as Miranda stabbed him 20 times in their Honda CR-V. LaFerrara's body was discovered the next day, November 12, 2013, in a residential back yard in Sunbury.

Police said after Miranda and Elytte dumped LaFerrara's body, the couple then bought bleach wipes, towels, and cleaning liquid to remove the blood from inside the vehicle and then went to dinner.

According to police, the Barbours initially denied even knowing LaFerrara, but police traced the last call from LaFerrara's phone to Miranda's phone. As the investigation developed, the couple's stories allegedly changed from Miranda's story of self-defense to a mutual confession to premeditated murder. The killing allegedly was a thrill killing, timed for three weeks after the couple's wedding, police have said.

Miranda Barbour, 19, and Elytte Barbour, 22, pled not guilty to first-degree murder charges that carried a possible death penalty upon conviction. Both plead out to second-degree murder in 2015 and sentenced to life in prison.

== Perpetrators ==
=== Miranda Barbour ===
Miranda Barbour
- Born: Miranda Kamille Dean; December 14, 1994 (age 31); North Pole, Alaska
- Spouse: Elytte Barbour (m. 2013)
- Children: Daughter
- Criminal charges: Murder, aggravated assault, robbery and possession of an instrument of crime

In an interview with the Sunbury Daily Item, Miranda Barbour claimed she was molested by a relative at the age of four. Barbour's mother confirmed that Miranda's uncle was charged with sexual abuse of a minor and sentenced to 19 years in prison. Barbour claimed that she joined a satanic cult at the age of 13 and soon after committed her first murder when the cult leader forced her to shoot a man indebted to their cult. She claimed to be responsible for the deaths of "at least 22 people" between 2008 and 2013. This claim triggered worldwide media attention and led to investigations of the claim by the FBI and other police forces.

A Northumberland County District Attorney told The Daily Item that he was skeptical of Miranda's claims, saying "We have been in contact with other law enforcement agencies where she has lived and haven't received any information verifying what she said." The Alaska State Troopers released a statement saying they have no evidence Barbour committed any murders during her time in Alaska.

=== Elytte Barbour ===
Elytte Barbour
- Born: Elytte Barbour; November 11, 1991 (age 35)
- Spouse: Miranda Barbour (m. 2013)
- Criminal charges: Murder, aggravated assault, robbery and possession of an instrument of crime

Elytte Barbour graduated from Triton High School in 2010. He married Miranda (née Dean) on October 22, 2013, when they were residing in Dunn, North Carolina.

On September 18, 2014, both were sentenced to life without parole.

== See also ==
- Internet homicide
