= KRKY =

KRKY may refer to:

- KRKY (AM), a radio station (930 AM) licensed to serve Granby, Colorado, United States
- KRKY-FM, a radio station (88.1 FM) licensed to serve Douglas, Wyoming, United States
- KVXO, a radio station (88.3 FM) licensed to serve Fort Collins, Colorado, which held the call sign KRKY-FM in 2015
- KGRE-FM, a radio station (102.1 FM) licensed to serve Estes Park, Colorado, which held the call sign KRKY-FM from 2006 to 2015
