= WJSA =

WJSA may refer to:

- WJSA-FM, a radio station (96.3 FM) licensed to Jersey Shore, Pennsylvania, United States
- WEJS, a radio station (1600 AM) licensed to Jersey Shore, Pennsylvania, which held the call sign WJSA from 1979 to 2014
