= WCFT =

WCFT may refer to:

- WCFT-FM, a radio station (106.5 FM) licensed to serve Bloomsburg, Pennsylvania, United States
- WCFT-LP, a low-power radio station (107.9 FM) licensed to serve Dover, New Jersey, United States
- WSES, a television station (channel 33) licensed to serve Tuscaloosa, Alabama, United States, which held the call sign WCFT-TV until 2015
