= KCCC =

KCCC may refer to:

- Kansas City Country Club
- Kent County Cricket Club
- Kandy Customs Cricket Club
- KCCC (AM), a radio station (930 AM) licensed to Carlsbad, New Mexico, United States
- KCCC-LP, a low-power radio station (98.5 FM) formerly licensed to Hays, Kansas, United States
- KCCC-TV, a television station (channel 40) formerly licensed to Sacramento, California, United States
- Kuwait Cancer Control Centre
