= Monroe Township, Snyder County, Pennsylvania =

Township in Pennsylvania, United States

Coordinates: 40°52′36″N 76°52′35″W

- Township
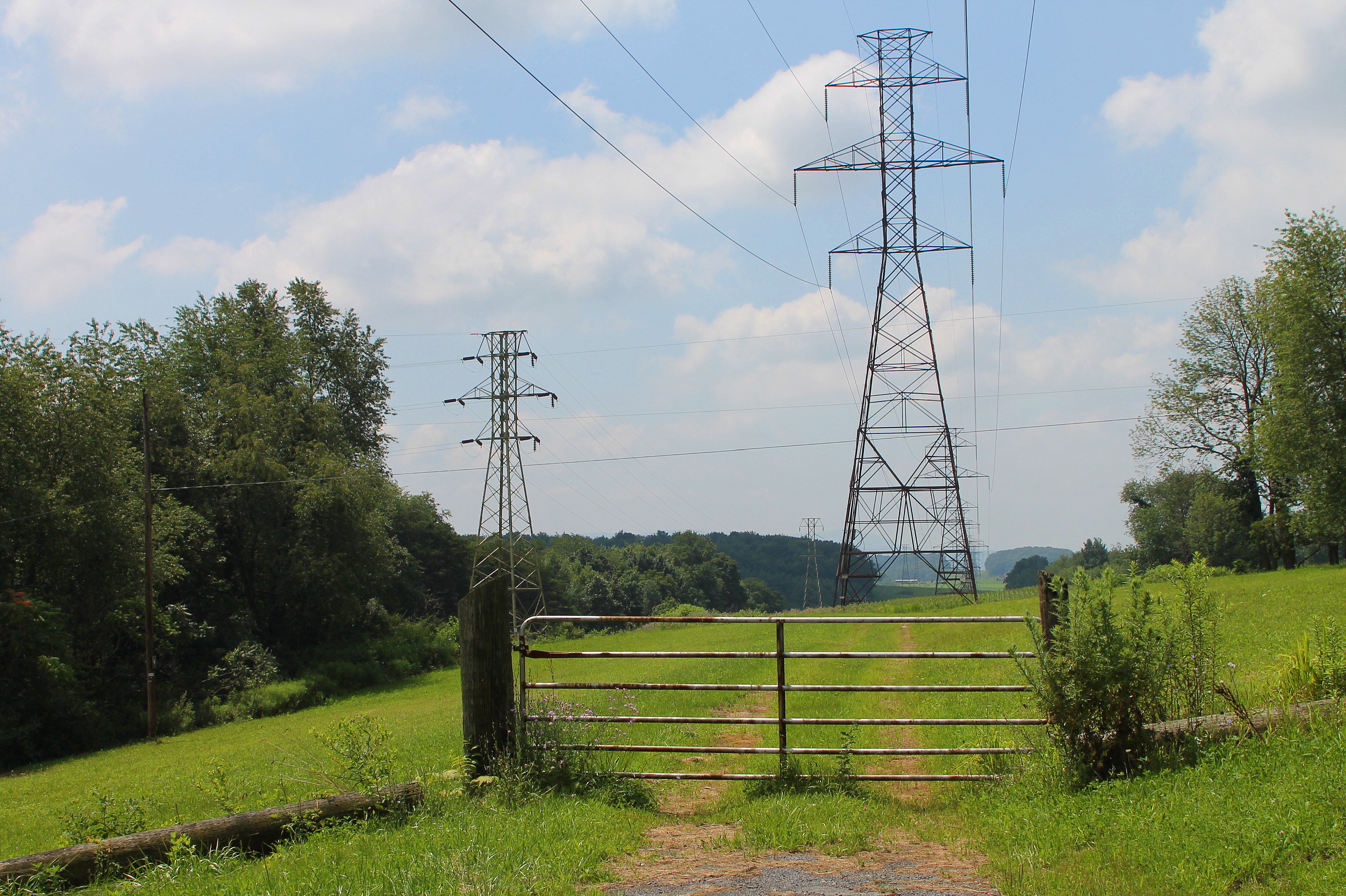
- Pylons in Monroe Township

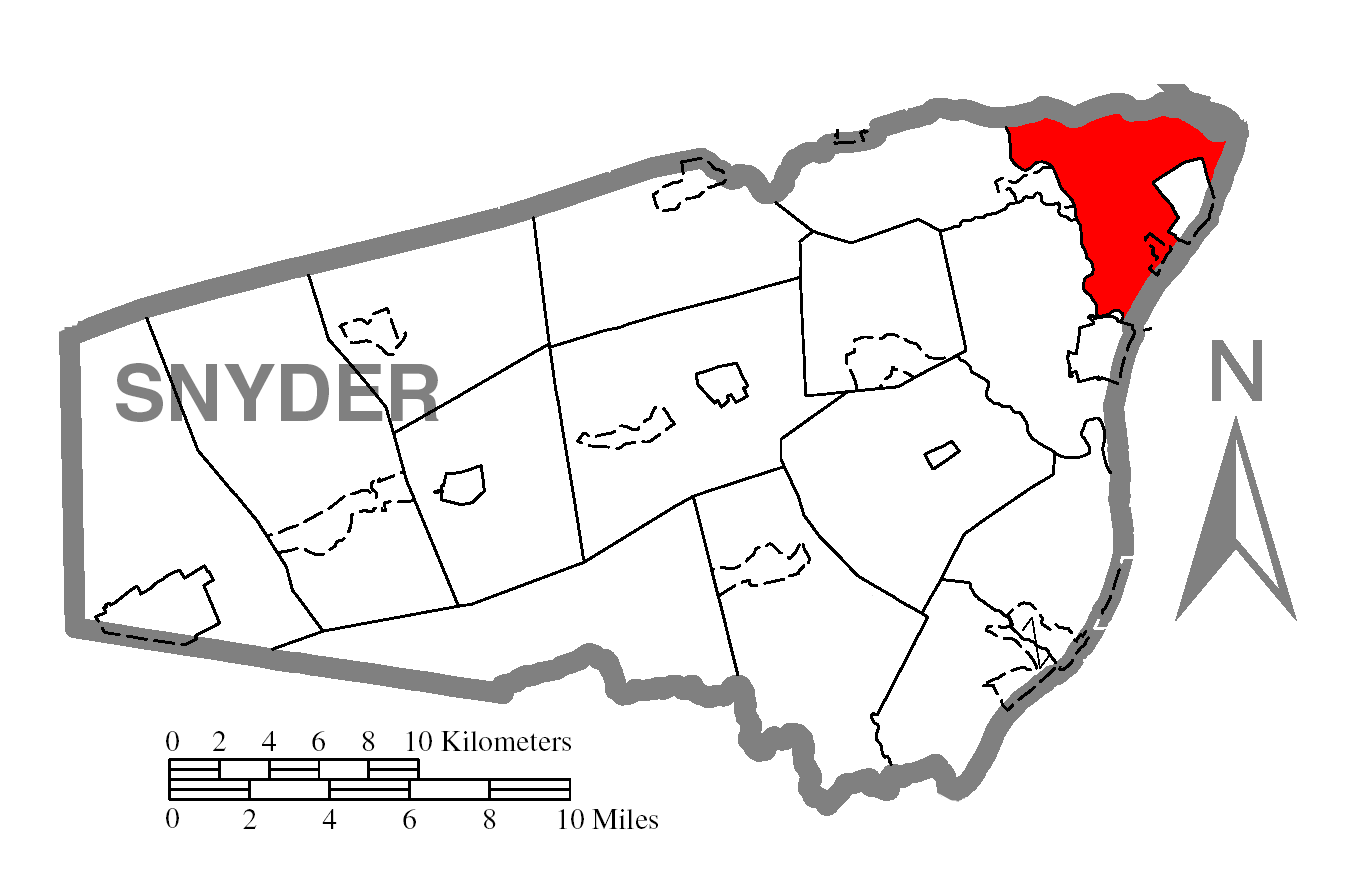
- Map of Snyder County, Pennsylvania highlighting Monroe Township

- Map of Snyder County, Pennsylvania
- Country: United States
- State: Pennsylvania
- County: Snyder
- Settled: 1794
- Incorporated: 1856

Area
  - Total: 15.74 sq mi (40.77 km^{2})
  - Land: 15.56 sq mi (40.30 km^{2})
  - Water: 0.18 sq mi (0.47 km^{2})

Population (2020)
  - Total: 4,150 ▲
  - Estimate (2022): 4,139
  - Density: 264.9/sq mi (102.26/km^{2})
- Time zone: UTC-5 (Eastern (EST))
  - Summer (DST): UTC-4 (EDT)
- Area code: 570
- FIPS code: 42-109-50488
- Website: https://monroetwpsnydercopa.com/

Monroe Township is a township in Snyder County, Pennsylvania, United States. The population was 4,150 at the 2020 census.

== History ==
The Bridge between Monroe and Penn Townships was added to the National Register of Historic Places in 1988.

== Geography ==
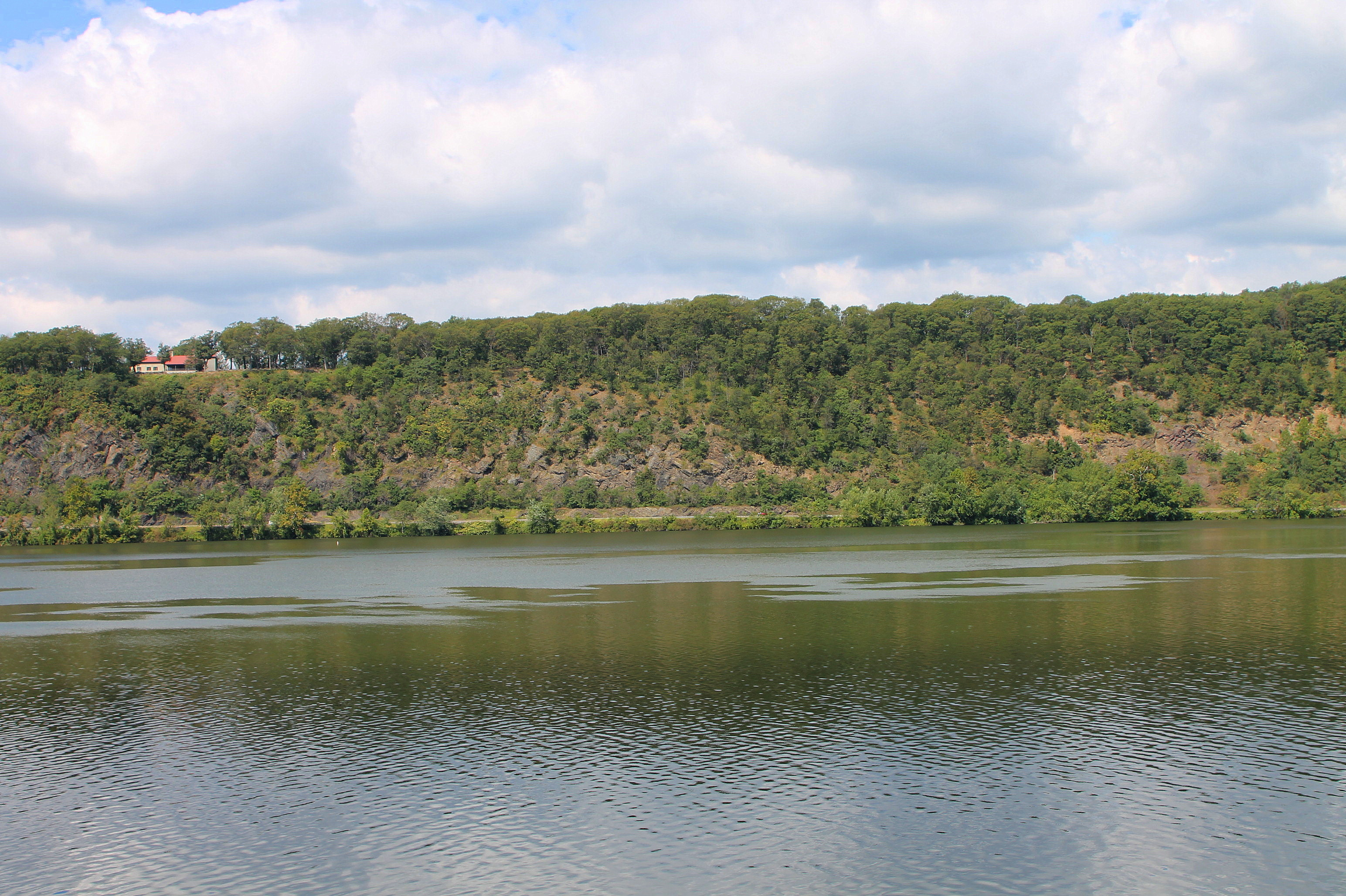
Cliffs in Monroe Township

According to the United States Census Bureau, the township has a total area of 15.8 square miles (40.8 km^{2}), of which 15.6 square miles (40.5 km^{2}) is land and 0.1 square mile (0.3 km^{2}) (0.76%) is water.

Monroe Township is bordered by Union County to the north, the Susquehanna River and Shamokin Dam to the east, Selinsgrove to the south, and Penn Township, Kratzerville and Jackson Township to the west.

Hummels Wharf is a census-designated place within the township.

Small creeks drain the township into the Susquehanna River. Flooding occurs in low-lying areas on an annual basis. A few areas have persistent standing water with most rains. Ground water is being monitored by the USGS. Ground-Water-Quality Data in Pennsylvania - A Compilation of Computerized Electronic Databases, 1979-2004

== Economy ==
The township (and inlaid Shamokin Dam) is home to most of Snyder County's commercial activity and serves as the location for nearly all of the county's national-chain retail outlets, hotels, and restaurants. The Susquehanna Valley Mall is in Monroe Township. The most recent addition is Monroe Marketplace, a collection of department stores and restaurants which was developed on farmland and the site of a former church camp along U.S. Routes 11 & 15. It was fully completed in 2009. Nearly every major "Big Box" retail format (e.g. home improvement, general merchandise, grocery, department store, and consumer electronics) has a presence in the township.

U.S. Routes 11 and 15 combine at the township's northern end and continue concurrently southward through the township. The highway is a major travel artery through the region.

The Penn Central Railroad passes through the township between Old Trail Road and the Susquehanna River, used for the delivery of coal to Sunbury Generation, a 420 MW coal-fired power plant in Shamokin Dam.

== Demographics ==
Historical population
Census	Pop.	Note	%±
2010	3,895		—
2020	4,150		6.5%
2022 (est.)	4,139		−0.3%
U.S. Decennial Census

As of the census of 2000, there were 4,012 people, 1,633 households, and 1,211 families residing in the township. The population density was 256.6 inhabitants per square mile (99.1/km^{2}). There were 1,772 housing units at an average density of 113.4 per square mile (43.8/km^{2}). The racial makeup of the township was 97.71% White, 0.25% African American, 0.05% Native American, 1.07% Asian, 0.17% from other races, and 0.75% from two or more races. Hispanic or Latino of any race were 0.52% of the population.

There were 1,633 households, out of which 30.3% had children under the age of 18 living with them, 66.6% were married couples living together, 5.4% had a female householder with no husband present, and 25.8% were non-families. 21.7% of all households were made up of individuals, and 9.1% had someone living alone who was 65 years of age or older. The average household size was 2.45 and the average family size was 2.86.

In the township, the population was spread out, with 22.6% under the age of 18, 5.2% from 18 to 24, 27.6% from 25 to 44, 29.2% from 45 to 64, and 15.4% who were 65 years of age or older. The median age was 42 years. For every 100 females, there were 96.8 males. For every 100 females age 18 and over, there were 95.3 males.

The median income for a household in the township was $41,907, and the median income for a family was $57,731. Males had a median income of $40,996 versus $22,490 for females. The per capita income for the township was $26,978. About 3.8% of families and 4.3% of the population were below the poverty line, including 4.7% of those under age 18 and 6.8% of those age 65 or over.

== Government ==
Monroe Township is governed by three elected supervisors.
