= WHNA =

Radio station in Riverside, Pennsylvania

- Riverside, Pennsylvania; United States
- Broadcast area: Sunbury–Selinsgrove–Lewisburg; Williamsport; Hazleton; Wilkes-Barre; Bloomsburg
- Frequency: 92.3 MHz
- Branding: Hanna 92-97-106

Programming
- Language: English
- Format: Classic hits

Ownership
- Owner: Seven Mountains Media; (Southern Belle, LLC)
- Sister stations: WCFT-FM; WRBG; WQBG

History
- First air date: 1990
- Former call signs: WLGL (1990–2011); WLGL-FM (2011); WVSL-FM (2011–2016)
- Call sign meaning: "Hanna"

Technical information
- Licensing authority: FCC
- Facility ID: 8552
- Class: A
- ERP: 930 watts
- HAAT: 254 meters (833 ft)
- Transmitter coordinates: 40°57′30.3″N 76°42′51.8″W
- Translators: 97.5 W248DK (Bloomsburg, relays WCFT-HD2)
- Repeaters: 106.1 WNNA (Beaver Springs); 106.5 WCFT-HD2 (Bloomsburg)

Links
- Public license information: Public file; LMS
- Webcast: Listen live
- Website: hannaradio.com

WHNA (92.3 FM, "Hanna 92-97-106") is a classic hits formatted radio station licensed to Riverside, Pennsylvania, United States. The station is owned by Seven Mountains Media, through licensee Southern Belle, LLC, and is operated out of studios in Selinsgrove, Pennsylvania. The station previously operated in simulcast with sister station WVSL with a sports radio format, until it was shut down by former owner Max Media in 2013. In October 2015, the station, along with other Max Media stations WFYY Y106.5 and WWBE B98.3, was purchased by Seven Mountains Media and on February 22, 2016, WVSL-FM was flipped to a classic hits format under new WHNA calls.

== Studios ==
ESPN Radio Selinsgrove's main studio was located at 450 Route 204 Highway in Selinsgrove. ESPN Radio Selinsgrove, along with its sister stations, operated a public studio located inside the Susquehanna Valley Mall located in Hummels Wharf. The mall location was also closed in early 2016.

== Programming ==
Hanna 92.3 FM took over on February 22, 2016. The station now plays classic hits, primiarly from the 60s, 70s and 80s. An unaffiliated website, www.susquehannavalleysports.com, was created to try to fill the sports broadcasting void following the format change in February 2016.

ESPN Radio Selinsgrove, at the prior WVSL-FM, was an affiliate of the Pittsburgh Steelers Radio Network and broadcast Pittsburgh Steelers football, both at home and on the road, every Sunday/Monday during the NFL season in place of regularly scheduled programming. The station was an affiliate of the Philadelphia Phillies Radio Network and broadcast Philadelphia Phillies Baseball, both at home and on the road during the MLB season in place of regularly scheduled programming. Hanna 92.3 dropped all of these affiliations, including NASCAR on Bigfoot Country, which moved to 106.5's frequency.

On March 5, 2018, WHNA began simulcasting on WNNA 106.1 FM, Beaver Springs, and rebranded as "Hanna 92.3 & 106.1".

On August 6, 2019, WHNA began simulcasting on WCFT-FM HD2 (106.5-2) along with the translator 99.3 W257CK, both in Bloomsburg.
