= 930 AM =

AM radio frequency

The following radio stations broadcast on AM frequency 930 kHz: As classified by the U.S. Federal Communications Commission and the Canadian Radio-television and Telecommunications Commission, 930 AM is a regional broadcast frequency.

== In Argentina ==
- LV28 in Villa Maria, Córdoba
- LV7 in San Miguel de Tucuman, Tucumán
- Nativa in San Justo

== In Canada ==
Call sign	City of license	Daytime power (kW)	Nighttime power (kW)	Transmitter coordinates
CFBC	Saint John, New Brunswick	50	50	45.231944°N 66.103333°W
CJCA	Edmonton, Alberta	50	50	53.383333°N 113.476389°W
CJYQ	St. John's, Newfoundland and Labrador	25	3.5	47.579167°N 52.786389°W

== In Chile ==
- CB-93 Radio Nuevo Mundo in Santiago, Metropolitan Region

== In Mexico ==
- XECSDC-AM in Xalapa, Veracruz
- XETLA-AM in Santa María Asunción Tlaxiaco, Oaxaca

== In the United States ==
Call sign	City of license	Facility ID	Class	Daytime power (kW)	Nighttime power (kW)	Unlimited power (kW)	Transmitter coordinates
KAFF	Flagstaff, Arizona	25694	D	5	0.031		35.190556°N 111.676944°W
KAGI	Grants Pass, Oregon	61334	D	5	0.123		42.437778°N 123.3575°W
KAPR	Douglas, Arizona	68768	D	2.5	0.071		31.368889°N 109.529167°W
KCCC	Carlsbad, New Mexico	35394	D	1	0.06		32.405556°N 104.189167°W
KDET	Center, Texas	9769	D	1	0.036		31.834167°N 94.214722°W
KHJ	Los Angeles, California	37224	B	5	5		34.085556°N 118.256667°W
KIUP	Durango, Colorado	22039	D	5	0.1		37.305°N 107.856944°W
KKIN	Aitkin, Minnesota	69484	B	2.5	0.36		46.540556°N 93.656111°W
KKXX	Paradise, California	7909	D	1	0.037		39.726944°N 121.679167°W
KLUP	Terrell Hills, Texas	34975	B	5	1		29.519167°N 98.403611°W (daytime); 29.518611°N 98.403611°W (nighttime)
KMPT	East Missoula, Montana	71754	D	5	0.022		46.865833°N 114.0825°W
KNSA	Unalakleet, Alaska	68754	B	10	10		63.887778°N 160.691111°W
KOGA	Ogallala, Nebraska	50065	B	2.1	0.5		41.1425°N 101.713333°W
KRKY	Granby, Colorado	24745	D	4.5	0.121		40.040556°N 105.936389°W
KROE	Sheridan, Wyoming	38626	D	5	0.117		44.798333°N 106.930833°W
KSDN	Aberdeen, South Dakota	25120	B	1	0.27		45.424722°N 98.5175°W
KSEI	Pocatello, Idaho	51216	B	5	5		42.962222°N 112.497222°W
KTKN	Ketchikan, Alaska	788	B	5	1		55.339444°N 131.636944°W
KWOC	Poplar Bluff, Missouri	6015	B	5	0.042		36.720833°N 90.367778°W
KYAK	Yakima, Washington	36030	D	10	0.127		46.613333°N 120.4825°W
WBEN	Buffalo, New York	34381	B	5	5		42.978333°N 78.9575°W
WDLX	Washington, North Carolina	64610	B	5	1		35.526667°N 77.075278°W
WFAT	Battle Creek, Michigan	37459	B	5	1		42.291944°N 85.183333°W
WFMD	Frederick, Maryland	31136	B	5	2.5		39.415278°N 77.461389°W
WFXJ	Jacksonville, Florida	51973	B	5	5		30.285833°N 81.747778°W
WGAD	Rainbow City, Alabama	22995	B	5	0.5		33.985556°N 86.0375°W
WHLM	Bloomsburg, Pennsylvania	12465	D	2	0.018		41.016667°N 76.462222°W
WIZR	Johnstown, New York	27553	D	1	0.028		42.998333°N 74.358611°W
WKBM	Sandwich, Illinois	48240	B	2.5	4.2		41.607222°N 88.453056°W
WKCT	Bowling Green, Kentucky	65589	D	1	0.059		37.033611°N 86.440278°W
WKY	Oklahoma City, Oklahoma	23418	B	5	0.51		35.561944°N 97.506667°W
WLBL	Auburndale, Wisconsin	63138	D	5	0.07		44.613333°N 90.037222°W
WLLL	Lynchburg, Virginia	17409	D	9	0.042		37.406944°N 79.2325°W
WLSS	Sarasota, Florida	59126	B	5	3		27.354722°N 82.385°W
WMGR	Bainbridge, Georgia	52401	D	5			30.906944°N 84.550556°W
WNCL	Milford, Delaware	53483	D	0.5	0.081		38.9275°N 75.488889°W
WNCR	Elyria, Ohio	19463	B	1	1		41.269444°N 82.004444°W
WPAT	Paterson, New Jersey	51661	B	5	5		40.849722°N 74.183056°W
WPKX	Rochester, New Hampshire	53387	B	5	5		43.286944°N 70.948611°W
WRVC	Huntington, West Virginia	21435	B	5	1		38.400833°N 82.495°W
WSEV	Sevierville, Tennessee	17058	D	5	0.148		35.878333°N 83.555°W
WSFZ	Jackson, Mississippi	62049	D	3.7	0.06		32.386667°N 90.163056°W
WTAD	Quincy, Illinois	64839	B	5	1		39.889722°N 91.423333°W
WWON	Waynesboro, Tennessee	50127	D	0.47	0.091		35.308333°N 87.745°W
WYAC	Cabo Rojo, Puerto Rico	15793	B			2.5	18.101389°N 67.154722°W
WYFQ	Charlotte, North Carolina	5152	B	5	1		35.268056°N 80.903056°W

== In Uruguay ==
- CX 20 Radio Monte Carlo in Montevideo
