= ESPN Radio 1050 =

ESPN Radio 1050 could refer to:

- WAMN, a radio station serving the Bluefield, WV market
- WEPN (AM), a radio station serving the New York market
- WLYC, a radio station serving the Williamsport, PA market
