= WLSS =

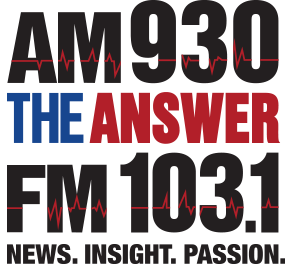
- Sarasota, Florida; United States
- Broadcast area: Sarasota - Bradenton
- Frequency: 930 kHz
- Branding: 930 The Answer

Programming
- Format: Talk radio
- Network: Townhall Radio News
- Affiliations: Salem Radio Network; Florida Gators Radio Network

Ownership
- Owner: Salem Communications; (Salem Communications Holding Corporation)

History
- First air date: May 23, 1949 (as WKXY 1540)
- Former call signs: WKXY (1949–1999); WUGL (1999–2002)
- Former frequencies: 1540 kHz (1949–1956)

Technical information
- Licensing authority: FCC
- Facility ID: 59126
- Class: B
- Power: 5,000 watts days 3,000 watts nights
- Transmitter coordinates: 27°21′17″N 82°23′06″W
- Translator: 93.7 W229BR (Bayshore Gardens)

Links
- Public license information: Public file; LMS
- Webcast: Listen Live
- Website: am930theanswer.com

WLSS (930 kHz) is a commercial radio station in Sarasota, Florida. It is owned by Salem Communications and airs a talk radio format. It is the oldest and most powerful AM station in the Sarasota-Bradenton radio market. The studios are on West Laurel Street in Sarasota.

WLSS is a Class B AM station. By day, it is powered at 5,000 watts. But at night, to protect other stations on 930 AM, it reduces power to 3,000 watts. It uses a directional antenna with a four-tower array. The transmitter is on Lorraine Road in the Lakewood Ranch section of Sarasota. Programming is also heard on 99-watt FM translator W229BR at 93.7 MHz in Bayshore Gardens.

== Programming ==
Most of WLSS's weekday schedule is conservative talk programs. Each weekday afternoon, a local Florida host is heard, Bill Bunkley, whose show is based at sister station WTBN in Tampa. The rest of the line up are nationally syndicated shows from the Salem Radio Network, hosted by Chris Stigall, Mike Gallagher, Charlie Kirk, Larry Elder and Hugh Hewitt. Most hours begin with an update from Townhall Radio News.

Weekends on WLSS feature shows on money, health, guns, technology and movies, some of which are paid brokered programming. Syndicated weekend hosts include Kim Komando and Eric Metaxas. WLSS also serves as the Sarasota affiliate of the University of Florida Gators radio network, broadcasting football and men's basketball games.

== History ==
The station signed on the air on May 23, 1949. The original call sign was WKXY and it was owned by the Sarasota Broadcasting Company. It was a daytimer station, required to go off the air at sunset. WKXY was powered at 1,000 watts and broadcast on 1540 kHz.

In the 1950s, WKXY made some big changes. It was given permission to move down the dial to 930 AM on December 1, 1956. And that was coupled with nighttime authorization, powered at 500 watts. WKXY was no longer required to go off the air at night.

In 1999, the call letters changed to WUGL. And the call sign switched to WLSS in 2002.

During Hurricane Ian in 2022 two of WLSS antennas were crushed to the ground. Latest map images still show the 2 masts on the Western part of the site lying in a sorry state of disrepair. When the 4 mast array was working the azimuths were 254° (Day and Critical) and 253° (Night). Possible fringe reception difficulties.

On January 5, 2015, WLSS rebranded as "930 The Answer". Many of Salem's talk stations around the country use "The Answer" as a moniker.

== Translators ==
WLSS broadcasts on an FM translator as part of the FCC's AM Revitalization authorization.

Broadcast translator for WLSS
Call sign	Frequency	City of license	FID	ERP (W)	HAAT	Class	FCC info
W229BR	93.7 FM	Bayshore Gardens	140537	99	64 m (210 ft)	D	LMS
