= WQXA-FM =

- York, Pennsylvania; United States
- Broadcast area: South Central Pennsylvania
- Frequency: 105.7 MHz (HD Radio)
- Branding: 105-7 The X

Programming
- Format: Active rock

Ownership
- Owner: Cumulus Media; (Radio License Holding CBC, LLC)
- Sister stations: WHGB, WNNK-FM, WTPA-FM

History
- First air date: 1948
- Former call signs: WNOW-FM (1948–1973); WQXA (1973–1991)

Technical information
- Licensing authority: FCC
- Facility ID: 52169
- Class: B
- ERP: 25,000 watts
- HAAT: 215 meters (705 ft)
- Transmitter coordinates: 39°59′56.4″N 76°41′41.9″W

Links
- Public license information: Public file; LMS
- Webcast: Listen Live
- Website: www.1057thex.com

WQXA-FM (105.7 FM) is a commercial radio station licensed to serve York, Pennsylvania. Owned by Cumulus Media, it broadcasts an active rock format serving South Central Pennsylvania. Its studios are located at 2300 Vartan Way in Harrisburg, Pennsylvania and the station's broadcast tower is located near York at (39°59′56.0″N 76°41′42.0″W).

== History ==
On August 8, 1947, the Federal Communications Commission proposed a new station on 105.7 MHz. The Helm Coal Company was granted a construction permit for the new station on May 12, 1948. The station was granted its first license on May 31, 1950, with the WNOW-FM call sign. On August 1, 1957, the station's license was transferred to WNOW, Inc.

The station's license was transferred to Rust Communications Group, Inc. on June 22, 1972. The call sign was changed to WQXA effective December 1, 1973.

The station was known as "Q106" in the 1970s. On October 17, 1989, at 4 p.m., the station's branding changed to "Hot 105.7" along with a format change to dance music. On November 1, 1991, the call sign was changed to WQXA-FM. On January 11, 1993, the station performed a format stunt, intermittently switching its branding between "Hot 105.7" and "Q106", later switching to "Q106" with a hot AC format. On May 16, 1995, the format changed from hot AC to active rock with a branding change to "105.7 The Edge". Later the format changed to modern rock with a branding change to "105-7 The X".

In 1997, Citadel Broadcasting purchased the station. In 2011, the United States Department of Justice approved the purchase of Citadel Broadcasting by Cumulus Media. The sale was completed on September 18, 2011.

Following the sale of WTPA to the Educational Media Foundation, WQXA quietly shifted to a mainstream rock lean.

== Signal ==
WQXA-FM is extremely short-spaced to WJZ-FM 105.7 The Fan (licensed to serve Catonsville, Maryland and targeting the Baltimore metropolitan area) as they operate on the same channel and the distance between the stations' transmitters is 47 miles (76 km) as determined by FCC rules. The minimum distance between two Class B stations operating on the same channel according to current FCC rules is 150 miles (240 km). Both stations use directional antennas to reduce their signals toward each other. Other stations in the Baltimore radio market can be heard clearly in York, the location of WQXA's broadcast tower.
