= WVSL (Pennsylvania) =

- Selinsgrove, Pennsylvania; United States
- Broadcast area: Sunbury-Selinsgrove-Lewisburg, Pennsylvania
- Frequency: 1240 kHz
- Branding: ESPN Radio Selinsgrove

Programming
- Format: Sports
- Affiliations: Pittsburgh Steelers Radio Network; Philadelphia Phillies Radio Network; ESPN Radio; Motor Racing Network; Performance Racing Network; Learfield Sports

Ownership
- Owner: Max Media of Pennsylvania; (MMP License LLC)

History
- First air date: January 16, 1967
- Last air date: February 8, 2013
- Former call signs: WSEW (1967–1982); WQBQ (1982–1984); WYGL (1984–2011)
- Call sign meaning: "Valley Sports Leader"

Technical information
- Facility ID: 63836
- Class: C
- Power: 1,000 watts
- Transmitter coordinates: 40°48′59.3″N 76°52′11.9″W

WVSL (1240 AM, "ESPN Radio Selinsgrove") was a sports talk formatted radio station licensed to serve Selinsgrove, Pennsylvania. The station was owned by Max Media and was operated out of the Max Media of Pennsylvania studios in Selinsgrove. The station operated in simulcast with sister station WVSL-FM. Established in 1967, WVSL surrendered its license to the Federal Communications Commission (FCC) on February 1, 2013; the license was canceled a week later.

== Studios ==
WVSL's main studio was located at 450 Route 204 Highway in Selinsgrove. WVSL, along with its sister stations, operated a public studio located inside the Susquehanna Valley Mall located in Hummels Wharf.

== Programming ==
Notable weekday programming included SportsCenter All Night, Mike and Mike in the Morning, The Herd with Colin Cowherd, The Scott Van Pelt Show, The Doug Gottlieb Show, and ESPN Radio Tonight.

WVSL was an affiliate of the Pittsburgh Steelers Radio Network and broadcasts Pittsburgh Steelers football, both at home and on the road, every Sunday/Monday during the NFL season in place of regularly scheduled programming. The station is an affiliate of the Philadelphia Phillies Radio Network and broadcasts Philadelphia Phillies Baseball, both at home and on the road during the MLB season in place of regularly scheduled programming.

WVSL broadcast PHAC events throughout the year. These broadcasts aired in place of regularly scheduled programming.
