= WCDF =

Radio station in Millersburg, Pennsylvania

- Millersburg, Pennsylvania; United States
- Broadcast area: Harrisburg, Pennsylvania
- Frequency: 98.9 MHz

Programming
- Format: Christian radio
- Affiliations: Family Life Network

Ownership
- Owner: Family Life Network; (Family Life Ministries, LLC)
- Sister stations: WCDI; WCDM

History
- First air date: February 24, 1992
- Former call signs: WQLV (1992–2026)
- Call sign meaning: With Christ Discover Forgiveness

Technical information
- Licensing authority: FCC
- Facility ID: 26975
- Class: A
- ERP: 780 watts
- HAAT: 273 meters (896 ft)
- Transmitter coordinates: 40°30′18″N 77°07′03″W

Links
- Public license information: Public file; LMS
- Website: www.familylife.org

WCDF (98.9 FM) is a radio station in Millersburg, Pennsylvania, snd serving the Harrisburg, Pennsylvania, metropolitan area. However, under the correct conditions (antenna quality, surroundings, weather, etc.), the station can be received with a nearly static-free stereo signal as far south as York, PA (about 40 miles (64 km) south of the transmitter). The station is owned by the Family Life Network, broadcasting Christian radio.

== History ==
The station was assigned the WQLV call letters by the Federal Communications Commission on December 13, 1991.

On November 13, 2025, Richard L. Cooper (owner of Cooper Communications) agreed to sell WQLV to Family Life Ministries for $300,000. The sale was completed on January 30, 2026.

On February 11, 2026, WQLV changed its call sign to WCDF.
