= WNNK-FM =

- Harrisburg, Pennsylvania; United States
- Broadcast area: Harrisburg–Carlisle metropolitan area
- Frequency: 104.1 MHz (HD Radio)
- RDS: PI: 7858; PS: artist - title; RT: artist - title
- Branding: WINK 104

Programming
- Language: English
- Format: Hot adult contemporary
- Subchannels: HD2: WHGB simulcast (sports radio); HD3: W243BR simulcast “HOT 96.5” (rhythmic contemporary)

Ownership
- Owner: Cumulus Media; (Cumulus Licensing LLC)
- Sister stations: WHGB; WQXA-FM; WTPA-FM

History
- First air date: 1962
- Former call signs: WTPA-FM (1962–1985); WNNK (1985–1990)
- Call sign meaning: The word "wink"

Technical information
- Licensing authority: FCC
- Facility ID: 32945
- Class: B
- ERP: 22,500 watts
- HAAT: 221 meters (725 ft)
- Transmitter coordinates: 40°18′59.3″N 76°57′2.9″W

Links
- Public license information: Public file; LMS
- Webcast: Listen live; Listen live (via Audacy); Listen live (via iHeartRadio)
- Website: www.wink104.com

WNNK-FM (104.1 MHz) is a commercial radio station licensed to serve Harrisburg, Pennsylvania. Owned by Cumulus Media it carries a hot adult contemporary radio format. The station's studios are on Vartan Way in Harrisburg, with its transmitter atop Blue Mountain in East Pennsboro Township.

== History ==
The station signed on for the first time in 1962, as WTPA-FM under ownership of Newhouse Broadcasting, owner of WTPA-TV (today's WHTM-TV) with a beautiful music format. It switched to an AOR format in 1980.

Until the 2000s, its ownership was less settled. Newhouse sold WTPA to Foster Media in 1982, who then sold it to Keymarket Communications in 1984. On January 14, 1985, the call sign was changed to WNNK, the station's branding changed to Wink 104 and the format changed to contemporary hit radio. Throughout the 1980s and 1990s, Wink 104 was consistently ranked #1 in the Arbitron ratings for the Harrisburg / Carlisle / Lebanon market.

Keymarket Communications sold WNNK to Capstar Broadcasting Corporation in 1995. In 1999, Capstar and Chancellor Media merged to form the nation's largest radio group of AMFM. AMFM was then itself purchased by Clear Channel Communications (now iHeartMedia) in a deal announced on October 3, 1999, and valued at $17.4 billion. The merger brought WNNK and the current-day WTPA-FM (which took those calls in 1985) under the same ownership, with on-air station attacks from WTPA ended under common ownership.

As a condition of the Clear Channel-AMFM merger, the United States Department of Justice forced the new company to sell 99 radio stations in 27 markets in the United States, including WTPA and WNNK, along with WTCY and WNCE-FM. All the stations were promptly sold to Cumulus Media.

In 2001, shortly after the ownership changes, Clear Channel launched WHKF in an attempt to reduce Wink 104's market dominance by stealing the younger portion of WNNK's audience. This ultimately led to Clear Channel's adult-oriented station WRVV taking the overall #1 position in the market; not because of improved ratings at WRVV, but because of decreased listenership at WNNK. Cumulus Media reacted to WHKF by launching their own youth-oriented station, Hot 92, the former WCTX and WNCE. Although WHKF never approached Wink 104 in Arbitron ratings, it did cause Wink 104 to change formats from hot AC to AC in March 2002. The logic to this maneuvering was that Wink 104 would continue to dominate the adult demographic, while Hot 92 would either dominate the young demographic or severely cripple WHKF's ratings.

From inception until 2003, Wink 104's studios and offices were located in a standalone building in uptown Harrisburg. Due to the consolidation with WTPA, WTCY, and WWKL, as well as the expenses involved with ongoing repairs, the studios and offices for all of the Cumulus Media stations were moved to a single location in an office park in Susquehanna Township (a suburb of Harrisburg).

Wink 104 is generally regarded as the original "Wink" station in contemporary radio, and has inspired other stations including the relatively close Wink 108 in State College, Pennsylvania, and Wink 106 in Corning, New York.

=== HD Radio ===
WNNK was one of the first HD Radio stations to be upgraded by Cumulus in 2005.

On August 20, 2008, Cumulus Media moved the urban AC programming on sister station WHGB, branded as "The Touch", to the HD2 subchannel of WNNK-FM, while WHGB switched to a sports radio format as an affiliate of the ESPN Radio network. The WHGB simulcast on 95.3, W237DE, which brought "The Touch" programming to FM, was switched to simulcasting WNNK-FM HD2 that day, keeping "The Touch" programming on 95.3 FM.

On August 27, 2011 "The Touch 95.3" posted on its website that its last day would be August 31, 2011, ending its programming on both 95.3 and WNNK-FM HD2. On August 31, Cumulus Media announced that W237DE would begin simulcasting WHGB the next day, on September 1, bringing ESPN Radio programming to 95.3.

In July 2026, WNNK-FM reactivated its HD2 subchannel, simulcasting sister station WHGB, following the discontinuation of the ESPN sports radio format on translator W243BR (96.5 FM). The translator subsequently adopted WWKL-FM’s former HOT branding and rhythmic contemporary format.

On September 17, 2026, WNNK-FM launched a new HD3 subchannel, which began simulcasting rhythmic contemporary W243BR “HOT 96.5” as a move to bring HD Radio listeners in the area with another way to listen to the station, alongside WTPA-FM HD2, which also simulcasts W243BR. The move was intended to expand the station’s coverage across the Harrisburg-York-Lebanon area.

== Signal note ==
WNNK-FM is short-spaced to WAEB-FM B104 (licensed to serve Allentown, Pennsylvania) as they both operate on the same channel and the distance between the stations' transmitters is 76 miles (122 km) as determined by FCC rules. The minimum distance between two Class B stations operating on the same channel according to current FCC rules is 150 miles (240 km).
