= WLLL =

Radio station in Lynchburg, Virginia

- Lynchburg, Virginia; United States
- Broadcast area: Lynchburg metropolitan area
- Frequency: 930 kHz
- Branding: AM 930 WLLL

Programming
- Format: Urban gospel

Ownership
- Owner: Hubbard's Advertising Agency, Inc.

History
- First air date: November 1, 1963
- Call sign meaning: Where Lynchburg Loves the Lord

Technical information
- Licensing authority: FCC
- Facility ID: 17409
- Class: D
- Power: 9,000 watts days; 42 watts nights
- Transmitter coordinates: 37°24′25″N 79°13′57″W

Links
- Public license information: Public file; LMS
- Website: WLLL Facebook page

WLLL (930 kHz) is a commercial AM radio station licensed to Lynchburg, Virginia. It broadcasts an urban gospel radio format and is owned and operated by Hubbard's Advertising Agency, Inc. The studios and offices are on Whitehall Road in Lynchburg.

By day, WLLL is powered at 9,000 watts non-directional. To protect other stations on 930 AM from interference, WLLL reduces power at night to 42 watts. The transmitter is on Chapel Lane in Lynchburg, near the Lynchburg Expressway (U.S. Route 501).

== History ==
WLLL signed on the air on November 1, 1963. The station was owned by the Griffith Broadcasting Corporation. It was originally a daytimer, required to go off the air at night.

In the 1960s and 1970s, WLLL was a Top 40 station, playing the hits of the day. It was an affiliate of the NBC Radio Network. In 1970, it added an FM counterpart, WLLL-FM, which at first simulcast AM 930. It later aired an automated oldies format as WGOL and today is WZZU.
