= WNNA =

Radio station in Beaver Springs, Pennsylvania

Simulcasting WHNA Riverside
- Beaver Springs, Pennsylvania; United States
- Broadcast area: Lewistown, Pennsylvania
- Frequency: 106.1 MHz
- Branding: Hanna 92-97-106

Programming
- Format: Classic hits
- Affiliations: Westwood One

Ownership
- Owner: Seven Mountains Media; (Southern Belle, LLC)
- Sister stations: WRBG; WQBG; WCFT-FM

History
- First air date: 1993 (as WWBV)
- Former call signs: WYHA (1991–1993, CP); WWBV (1993–1996); WLZS (1996–2015); WZBF (2015–2018)

Technical information
- Licensing authority: FCC
- Facility ID: 40422
- Class: A
- ERP: 175 watts
- HAAT: 400 meters (1,300 ft)
- Transmitter coordinates: 40°42′4.2″N 77°12′48.9″W

Links
- Public license information: Public file; LMS
- Webcast: Listen live
- Website: hannaradio.com

WNNA (106.1 FM, "Hanna 92.3 & 106.1") is a radio station broadcasting a classic hits format. Licensed to Beaver Springs, Pennsylvania, United States, the station is currently owned by Seven Mountains Media, through licensee Southern Belle, LLC. It serves areas west of Selinsgrove. It features programming from Westwood One. It is part of a simulcast with WHNA 92.3 FM Riverside.

== History ==
On March 5, 2018, WNNA changed their format from country (as "Bigfoot Country") to a simulcast of classic hits-formatted WHNA 92.3 FM Riverside.

== Coverage area ==
WNNA serves the area west of WHNA, including western Snyder County, eastern Juniata County, and northern Perry County. The towns of McClure, Thompsontown, and Millerstown are included.

== See also ==
- WCFT-FM (heard on HD2)
- WHNA
