= WRBG (FM) =

Radio station in Mifflinburg, Pennsylvania

- Mifflinburg, Pennsylvania; United States
- Broadcast area: Sunbury–Selinsgrove-Lewisburg
- Frequency: 98.3 MHz
- Branding: Bigfoot Country 98-106

Programming
- Format: Country
- Affiliations: Motor Racing Network; Performance Racing Network; Learfield Sports; Westwood One

Ownership
- Owner: Seven Mountains Media; (Southern Belle, LLC)
- Sister stations: WQBG; WNNA; WCFT-FM

History
- First air date: 1975
- Former call signs: WJJR-FM (1975–1979); WWMC-FM (1979–1988); WWBE (1988–2016)

Technical information
- Licensing authority: FCC
- Facility ID: 40424
- Class: A
- ERP: 1,400 watts
- HAAT: 147 meters (482 ft)
- Transmitter coordinates: 40°53′27.3″N 76°59′52.9″W

Links
- Public license information: Public file; LMS
- Website: thisisbigfootcountry.com

WRBG (98.3 FM, "Bigfoot Country") is a country music formatted radio station in Mifflinburg, Pennsylvania, United States. The station is owned by Seven Mountains Media, through licensee Southern Belle, LLC, and is operated out of studios in Selinsgrove, Pennsylvania. The station operates in simulcast with sister stations WQBG and WCFT-FM. Although also owned by Seven Mountains Media, WRBG and its other simulcasting frequencies feature different programming than WIBF and WDBF, which are also branded as Bigfoot Country.

== Studios ==
WRBG's main studio is located at 450 Route 204 Highway in Selinsgrove. WRBG, along with its sister stations, operates a public studio located inside the Susquehanna Valley Mall located in Hummels Wharf.

== Coverage area ==
WRBG, based in Mifflinburg, serves primarily Union and Snyder Counties, as well as parts of Northumberland County. Primarily, the towns of Lewisburg, Northumberland, Sunbury, and Selinsgrove are served by WRBG of the Bigfoot Country network.

== Programming ==
WRBG on-air personalities include Mark Roberts, Shelly Marx, Todd Stewart, and Jeff Shaffer. Weekday programming includes The B Breakfast Bunch with Mark and Shelly, Todd Stewart on mid-days, Monica on afternoons, Kyle Alexander on nights, and "Big Country Variety" overnight. Specialty weekend programs include Power Source Country, Voice Of Prophecy, Max Potential, NAC, ZMAX Racing Country, NASCAR USA, and CMT Radio Insider.

Bigfoot Country is an affiliate of Penn State Sports Properties from Learfield Sports and broadcasts Penn State Nittany Lions football, both at home and on the road, every Saturday during the college football season in place of regularly scheduled programming. The station is an affiliate of Motor Racing Network and Performance Racing Network and broadcasts every race (except the Brickyard 400) during the NASCAR Sprint Cup Season in place of regularly scheduled programming during race weekends along with NASCAR-oriented programming on Sundays throughout the year.

== See also ==
- WCFT-FM
- WQBG
- WNNA
