= KRKY (AM) =

- Granby, Colorado; United States
- Frequency: 930 kHz
- Branding: Ski Country - FM

Programming
- Format: Country music

Ownership
- Owner: Patricia MacDonald Garber and Peter Benedetti; (AlwaysMountainTime, LLC)

History
- Former call signs: KRDZ (1984–1986); KTLD (1986–1988)

Technical information
- Licensing authority: FCC
- Facility ID: 24745
- Class: D
- Power: 4,500 watts day 121 watts night
- Transmitter coordinates: 40°2′26″N 105°56′11″W

Links
- Public license information: Public file; LMS
- Webcast: Listen Live
- Website: alwaysmountaintime.com/krky

KRKY (930 AM) is a radio station broadcasting a country music format. Licensed to Granby, Colorado, United States, the station is currently owned by Patricia MacDonald Garber and Peter Benedetti, through licensee AlwaysMountainTime, LLC.

== FM Translator ==
The programming for Ski Country FM originates with KRKY 930 AM; an FM translator is not allowed to operate independently. In this case the translator frequency is used in the logo and branding of the station.

Broadcast translator for KRKY (AM)
Call sign	Frequency	City of license	FID	ERP (W)	Class	FCC info
K270AL	101.9 FM	Granby, Colorado	142131	250	D	LMS

== History ==
The station was assigned the call letters KRDZ on 1984-08-13. On 1986-05-21, the station changed its call sign to KTLD and on 1988-03-16 to the current KRKY.
