= WEJS =

Radio station in Jersey Shore, Pennsylvania

Coordinates: 41°13′32″N 77°16′01″W

- Jersey Shore, Pennsylvania; United States
- Broadcast area: Williamsport area
- Frequency: 1600 kHz
- Branding: Bigfoot Legends 103.7 & 104.3

Programming
- Format: Classic country
- Affiliations: Compass Media Networks

Ownership
- Owner: Seven Mountains Media; (Southern Belle, LLC)
- Sister stations: WLYC

History
- First air date: August 1, 1979 (as WJSA)
- Former call signs: WJSA (1979–2014)

Technical information
- Licensing authority: FCC
- Facility ID: 14223
- Class: D
- Power: 1,000 watts day; 20 watts night
- Translator: 104.1 W281CO (Jersey Shore)

Links
- Public license information: Public file; LMS
- Webcast: Listen live
- Website: bigfootlegendspa.com

WEJS (1600 AM) is a classic country radio station in licensed to Jersey Shore, Pennsylvania, United States, and serving the Williamsport area. The station is owned by Seven Mountains Media.

WEJS previously programmed a mix of general-interest and conservative talk radio from Salem Radio Network and Westwood One, alongside sports talk from Fox Sports Radio. The station also carries high school sports, Pennsylvania College of Technology athletics, and national sports from Sports USA Radio Network.

== History ==
The then-WJSA was originally an AM-only radio station authorized to operate during the daytime at 1600 on the dial. Though not in a Christian format, the station aired some daily devotional programs. In the fall of 1980, the station's owner, Williamsport businessman Ken Breon, sought the help of John Hogg, seeking his expertise in broadcasting engineering and programming. Within the year, Hogg was made General Manager. Under Hogg's management and with Breon's agreement and involvement, the station changed the format to full-time Christian programming. The AM station also extended its hours of operation and improved coverage.

=== The birth of WJSA-FM ===
24 years ago, Hogg identified an available FM frequency that would provide extended coverage and allow 24 hours a day service. Two years later the FCC granted the application and Light for Life. WJSA-FM began broadcasting on November 1, 1984, with a power of 3,000 Watts at 93.5 FM. A new company to operate the facilities was formed, Covenant Broadcast Company, a partnership between Breon and Hogg.

=== Expanding the FM coverage ===
Almost immediately, Hogg identified the opportunity for several stations in the area to upgrade their signal strength by changing frequencies. In the early spring of 1997, this power upgrade was realized and Light for Life WJSA-FM's frequency was changed to 96.3 FM with a power equivalent of 25,000 Watts.

=== 2014 changes ===
Effective January 17, 2014, Covenant Broadcast Company sold WJSA to Todd Bartley's Pioneer Sports Productions, LLC at a purchase price of $50,000.

On January 21, 2014, the station's call sign was changed to the current WEJS. The station dropped the Christian radio simulcast with former sister station WJSA-FM (96.3 FM) and FM translator W263AG (100.5 FM), and started broadcasting a sports radio format as 1600 AM ESPN.

=== 2015 changes ===
Bartley transferred WEJS' license to his wholly owned Colonial Radio Group of Williamsport, LLC on August 17, 2015.

=== 2016 changes ===
On May 18, 2016, the Court of Common Pleas of Lycoming County issued an Order granting a motion by First Citizens Community Bank that a Receiver be appointed to take control of the radio stations and assets of Colonial Radio Group of Williamsport, LLC to facilitate the sale of the stations and pay the proceeds to the bank.

=== 2017 changes ===
On March 1, 2017, WEJS switched affiliations from ESPN Radio to Fox Sports Radio.

In July, 2017, WEJS ended its simulcast with sister-station WLYC and rebranded itself to "NewsTalk 104.1 & 1600", airing a mix of conservative talk, news, and sports.

=== 2020 changes ===
On April 8, 2020, Terry Ginn, Receiver, filed an application on FCC form 316 for the involuntary assignment of license of the stations pursuant to the Court of Common Pleas’ Order of January 15, 2019 due to the current owner's refusal to sign any Asset Purchase Agreement for the stations or otherwise cooperate in the sale of the station to the prospective purchaser.

On May 16, 2020, WEJS was taken silent by Terry Ginn, the court appointed receiver of the previous licensee while the receiver and the prospective buyer negotiates an asset purchase agreement and files for the assignment of the station. The station was to return to operation after the consummation of the assignment of the station by the prospective new licensee.

On May 29, 2020, an asset purchase agreement for WEJS, sister-station WLYC, and associated translators between Terry Ginn, Receiver and Seven Mountains Media, LLC & Southern Belle, LLC was filed with the FCC with a closing date within 15 business days after the final order has occurred. The purchase was consummated on October 5, 2020, at a price of $100,000.

=== 2022 changes ===
On February 1, 2022 WEJS changed their format from news/talk to a simulcast of classic country-formatted sister station WLYC 1050 AM Williamsport, branded as "Bigfoot Legends".

== Previous logos ==
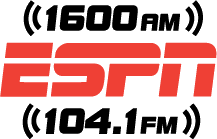
