= WCFT-FM =

- Bloomsburg, Pennsylvania; United States
- Frequency: 106.5 MHz (HD Radio)
- Branding: Bigfoot Country

Programming
- Format: Country
- Subchannels: HD2: Simulcast of WHNA (Classic hits); HD3: Simulcast of WHLM (Classic rock)
- Affiliations: Compass Media Networks

Ownership
- Owner: Seven Mountains Media; (Southern Belle, LLC)
- Sister stations: WRBG; WQBG; WNNA

History
- First air date: 1956
- Former call signs: WHLM-FM (1956–1988); WHLM (1988–2001); WFYY (2001–2016)
- Call sign meaning: similar to "Bigfoot Country"

Technical information
- Licensing authority: FCC
- Facility ID: 39605
- Class: B
- ERP: 10,500 watts (analog); 167 watts (digital)
- HAAT: 313 meters (1,027 ft)
- Transmitter coordinates: 40°56′18.3″N 76°25′36.8″W
- Translator: HD2: 97.5 W248DK (Bloomsburg)
- Repeaters: 98.3 WRBG (Mifflinburg); 100.5 WQBG (Elizabethville)

Links
- Public license information: Public file; LMS
- Webcast: Listen live
- Website: thisisbigfootcountry.com

WCFT-FM (106.5 MHz, "Bigfoot Country") is an American country music formatted radio station licensed to serve Bloomsburg, Pennsylvania. The station is the flagship station of the Bigfoot Country radio network owned by Seven Mountains Media, through licensee Southern Belle, LLC, and is operated out of studios in Selinsgrove, Pennsylvania. WCFT-FM reaches the northern and eastern area of Bigfoot Country's audience. It operates as Bigfoot Country along with sister stations WRBG and WQBG. Although also owned by Seven Mountains Media, WCFT and its other simulcasting frequencies feature different programming than WIBF and WDBF-FM, which are also branded as Bigfoot Country.

== Studios ==
WCFT-FM's main studio is located at 450 Route 204 Highway in Selinsgrove. The station, along with its sister stations, operates a public studio located inside the Susquehanna Valley Mall located in Hummels Wharf.

== Coverage area ==
WCFT serves the northern and eastern portions of the Bigfoot Country audience, but it has one of the largest coverage areas. Based in Bloomsburg, it easily covers Columbia and Montour Counties, but its signal also reaches well into Luzerne County, Schuylkill County, much of Sullivan County, eastern Lycoming County, Northumberland County, Union County, and eastern Snyder County. The wide coverage area causes significant overlap with other stations in the Bigfoot Country network.

== Programming ==
Bigfoot Country features "The Morning Lookout" morning drive show featuring Shelly Woods and the Harry Mann, Betti the Yeti in the mid-day, B.F. Hunter on afternoons and "Taste of Country Nights" in the evening.

Previous weekday programming included The Breakfast Show with Tom Morgan, Loran Hunter on mid-days, Chad Evans on afternoons, Kyle Blessing on nights, and Y106.5 Mix overnight. Weekend programming for Y106.5 varied between live personalities at the Sunbury Motors Studios, voice-tracked personalities, and Y106.5 Mix.

== See also ==
- WRBG (FM)
- WQBG
- WHNA (simulcast on HD2)
