= WHGB =

- Harrisburg, Pennsylvania; United States
- Broadcast area: Harrisburg metropolitan area
- Frequency: 1400 kHz
- Branding: ESPN Harrisburg

Programming
- Format: Sports radio
- Affiliations: ESPN Radio; Harrisburg Senators; Penn State Nittany Lions

Ownership
- Owner: Cumulus Media; (Cumulus Licensing LLC)
- Sister stations: WNNK-FM, WQXA-FM, WTPA-FM

History
- First air date: May 28, 1945; 81 years ago
- Former call signs: WHGB (1945–1963); WFEC (1963–1984); WHGB (1984–1990); WNNK (1990–1993); WTCY (1993–2008)
- Call sign meaning: Harrisburg (B and G reversed)

Technical information
- Licensing authority: FCC
- Facility ID: 32944
- Class: C
- Power: 1,000 watts unlimited
- Transmitter coordinates: 40°14′58.32″N 76°52′0″W
- Translator: See § Translators
- Repeater: 104.1 WNNK-HD2 (Harrisburg)

Links
- Public license information: Public file; LMS
- Webcast: Listen live
- Website: www.sportsradioharrisburg.com

WHGB (1400 AM) is a commercial radio station in Harrisburg, Pennsylvania. The station is owned by Cumulus Media and broadcasts a sports radio format. Most programming is supplied by ESPN Radio.

Programming is also heard on one FM translator, W237DE at 95.3 MHz in Harrisburg, Pennsylvania.

== History ==
On May 28, 1945, the station first signed on, owned by the Harrisburg Broadcasting Company. It was given the call sign WHGB and broadcast at 250 watts, as a network affiliate of ABC. In 1963, it became WFEC (for its owner Florida East Coast Broadcasting) featuring a Top 40 format. By 1977, it tried several unsuccessful formats, including country music, disco and urban contemporary.

In 1982, owned by Great Scott Broadcasting, it returned to Top 40, adopting Mike Joseph's Hot Hits format in response to that format's national success. Although WFEC featured the jingles and other high-energy basics of the Hot Hits format, it was not consulted by Joseph himself. During the Hot Hits era, the station was known as Fire 14.

By the last quarter of 1984, the station changed its call sign back to WHGB. For much of the 1980s it featured Al Ham's "The Music of Your Life" adult standards format along with substantial local sports play by play.

On October 31, 1990, the station changed its call sign to WNNK as "Wink 1400", a sister station to 104.1 WNNK-FM. On August 27, 1993, WNNK 1400 changed its call sign to WTCY and its format switched to Urban Adult Contemporary, branded as "1400 The Touch," using a satellite-delivered syndicated service known as "The Touch."

On July 24, 2008, WTCY began simulcasting "The Touch" programming on an FM translator, 95.3 W237DE.

On August 20, 2008, WTCY changed back to its original call letters, WHGB, which it had used in the 1940s, 1950s and 1960s and again from 1984 until 1990. The station changed format to sports radio as an ESPN Radio affiliate, while the Urban AC format was moved to the HD2 subchannel of sister station WNNK-FM, which allowed W237DE to continue to simulcast "The Touch." On September 1, 2011, the translator's simulcast was switched back to WHGB, bringing ESPN Radio to FM in Harrisburg, and ending "The Touch."

On January 2, 2013, the station switched to the CBS Sports Radio network.

On March 2, 2015, WHGB changed its format from sports to country, branded as "95.3 Nash Icon." Nash Icon is heard on dozens of Cumulus-owned stations, featuring country artists who first achieved fame in the 1980s, 90s and early 2000s. Then, about a year later, the sports format returned, once again using CBS Sports Radio as its primary programming source.

In August 2024, WHGB switched affiliations from Infinity Sports Network back to ESPN Radio.

On July 23, 2026, Cumulus Media ended the simulcast of WHGB on W243BR (96.5 FM) and began airing the HOT branding and rhythmic contemporary format previously carried by WWKL-FM on 106.7.

== Translators ==
WHGB programming is broadcast on the following translator:

Broadcast translator for WHGB
Call sign	Frequency	City of license	FID	ERP (W)	HAAT	Class	Transmitter coordinates	FCC info
W237DE	95.3 FM	Harrisburg, Pennsylvania	158598	250	194 m (636 ft)	D	40°18′59.3″N 76°57′2.9″W	LMS

== Previous logos ==
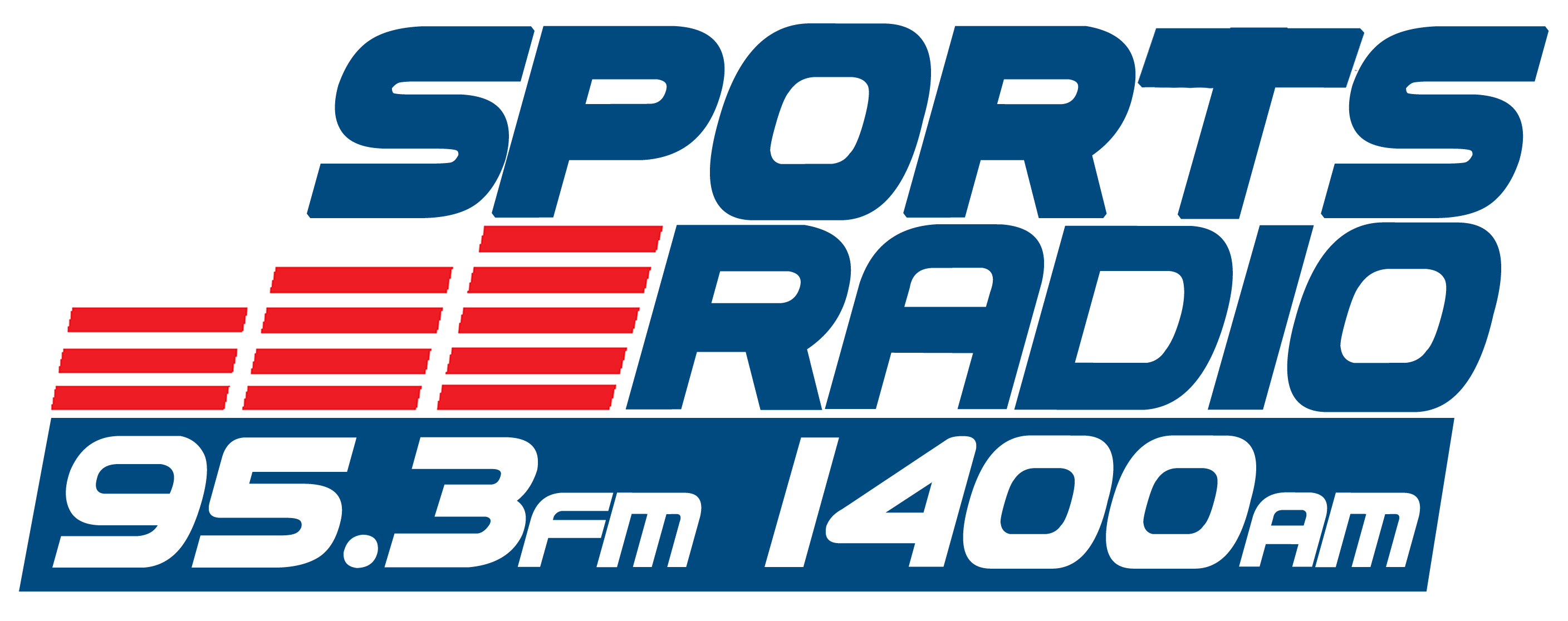

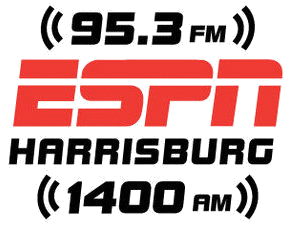

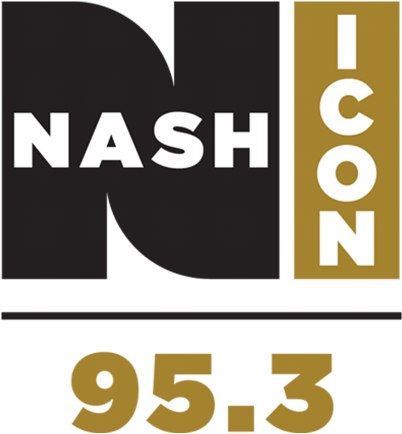
