= KCCC (AM) =

Radio station in Carlsbad, New Mexico

- Carlsbad, New Mexico; United States
- Frequency: 930 kHz
- Branding: Carlsbad's Classic Country

Programming
- Format: Classic country

Ownership
- Owner: Jonathan Chandler; (Chandler Broadcasting Llc.)

History
- First air date: 1967

Technical information
- Licensing authority: FCC
- Facility ID: 35394
- Class: D
- Power: 1,000 watts day; 60 watts night
- Transmitter coordinates: 32°24′20″N 104°11′21″W

Links
- Public license information: Public file; LMS
- Website: kccc930am.com

KCCC (930 AM) is a radio station broadcasting a classic country music format. Licensed to Carlsbad, New Mexico, United States, the station is currently owned by Jonathan Chandler, through licensee Chandler Broadcasting Llc.
