= WKHL (FM) =

- Palmyra, Pennsylvania; United States
- Broadcast area: Harrisburg, Pennsylvania
- Frequency: 92.1 MHz
- Branding: K-LOVE

Programming
- Format: Contemporary Christian

Ownership
- Owner: Educational Media Foundation; (K-LOVE, Inc.)
- Sister stations: WKYJ; WROZ

History
- First air date: 1959 (as WJWR)
- Former call signs: WJWR (1959–1965); WRLC (1965–1969); WCTX (1969–1995); WNCE-FM (1995–2001); WWKL (2001–2011); WTPA (2011–2018)
- Call sign meaning: Sounds similar to "K-Love"

Technical information
- Licensing authority: FCC
- Facility ID: 12050
- Class: A
- ERP: 1,500 watts
- HAAT: 183.2 meters (601 ft)
- Transmitter coordinates: 40°23′28.3″N 76°43′29.8″W

Links
- Public license information: Public file; LMS
- Webcast: Listen live
- Website: www.klove.com

WKHL (92.1 MHz, "K-LOVE") is a non-commercial FM radio station licensed to serve Palmyra, Pennsylvania. The station is owned by Educational Media Foundation and is an affiliate of K-LOVE, EMF's contemporary Christian music network.

== History ==
The station was first licensed on December 4, 1959, with the WJWR call sign. It was owned by William N. Reichard. The station was sold effective January 1, 1961, to Radio Music, Inc. On July 20, 1965, the call sign was changed to WRLC, followed by a change in ownership to Harrisburg Broadcasting Corporation effective on August 27, 1965. Another ownership change took place effective April 14, 1969, to Clinton Broadcasting Company, followed by a call sign change on May 15, 1969, to WCTX. By 1977, the station was broadcasting a beautiful music format.

By 1990, the station had switched to an oldies format, but by 1994 the format had switched back to beautiful music.

On November 2, 1995, the station was sold to Quaker State Broadcasting corporation. Following the change in ownership, the station's call sign was changed to WNCE-FM on November 8, 1995. The station's beautiful music format was not changed.

In 1999, AMFM, Inc, through licensee Capstar TX L.P., purchased WNCE-FM (along with WTPA) for $15 million. On October 3, 1999, Clear Channel Communications announced the purchase of AMFM, Inc., in a deal valued at $17.4 billion. As a condition of the Clear Channel-AMFM merger, the United States Department of Justice forced the new company to sell 99 radio stations in 27 markets in United States, including Harrisburg-area stations WTPA, WNNK-FM, WTCY and WNCE-FM. All went to Cumulus Media. The sale of WNCE-FM was completed on November 28, 2000.

Following the sale, the station switched format to classic rock via a simulcast of Cumulus-owned sister station WTPA. On August 3, 2001, the station's call sign was changed to WWKL. The WTPA (FM) simulcast would continue until 2004.

By 2005, the station had switched to a CHR/rhythmic format, branded as HOT 92. The move was part of a shakeup in the market when sister station WNNK-FM shifted to Adult Top 40 and to counter Rhythmic-leaning Top 40 Mainstream rival upstart WHKF-FM, a move that has paid off for them in terms of ratings. By 2006 WWKL began shifting towards a mainstream CHR direction to compete with WLAN-FM, even though as of 2009 they still reported to R&R/Nielsen BDS Rhythmic Airplay panel.

In 2011, the United States Department of Justice approved the purchase of Citadel Broadcasting by Cumulus, provided that Cumulus divest itself of three stations, two of which were WWKL (HOT 92) and WCAT-FM (Red 102.3) as well as the "intellectual property" of WTPA. Cumulus chose to swap the WTPA and WWKL licenses, effectively moving the WTPA call sign and the rock music format to 92.1, while the WWKL call sign and the CHR format moved to 93.5. The swap took place on September 16, 2011, after which WTPA changed its branding to 92.1 WTPA.

Cumulus Media placed WTPA into a trust named Potential Broadcasting LLC. On October 12, 2012, it was announced that the trust had sold WTPA to Patrick H. Sickafus, owner of WWSM in Annville, Pennsylvania. The transaction consummated on January 31, 2013, at a purchase price of $530,000.

=== Sale to Educational Media Foundation ===
On November 9, 2017, Educational Media Foundation purchased WTPA for $750,000. EMF planned to transition the station to become part of their K-LOVE contemporary Christian radio network, which in the Harrisburg area already includes translator W269AS and WKHW. WTPA went silent on January 31, 2018, in preparation for the ownership change. The sale consummated on February 1, 2018. On February 12, 2018, the FCC granted WTPA a new license, which modified the previous license granted in 2006 from commercial to non-commercial status. Two days later, on February 14, 2018, the FCC assigned the WKHL call sign to the station. Prior to this call sign change, a station with the WTPA call sign had been on the air in the Harrisburg market since 1980.

WKHL resumed operations with K-Love programming on March 21, 2018.

== Signal ==
Unlike sister station WROZ (and as WKHL is licensed to Palmrya), which its transmitter is located near US 30 north of Hallam, along with WGAL-TV, (WROZ's former studios and transmitter was at 1996 Auction Rd in Manheim) WKHL transmits its signals with its transmitter from 40° 23′ 28.3″ N, 76° 43′ 29.8″ W (17.6 miles from Downtown Harrisburg). Therefore, WKHL's signal is much stronger in Harrisburg and Lebanon (Lebanon people listens to both WKHL and WROZ according to K-LOVE and former Fun 101.3's legal IDs) but is considerably weaker in Lancaster and York areas.
