= WTPA-FM =

- Mechanicsburg, Pennsylvania; United States
- Broadcast area: Harrisburg, Pennsylvania
- Frequency: 93.5 MHz (HD Radio)
- Branding: 93.5 WTPA

Programming
- Language: English
- Format: Classic rock
- Subchannels: HD2: Simulcast of W243BR "HOT 96.5" (rhythmic contemporary)

Ownership
- Owner: Cumulus Media; (Cumulus Licensing LLC)
- Sister stations: WHGB, WNNK-FM, WQXA-FM

History
- First air date: November 1, 1978 (as WQVE)
- Former call signs: WQVE (1977–1983); WKCD-FM (1983–1985); WTPA-FM (1985–1986); WTPA (1986–2011); WWKL (2011–2018); WZCY-FM (2018–2021)

Technical information
- Licensing authority: FCC
- Facility ID: 54021
- Class: A
- ERP: 1,250 watts
- HAAT: 219 meters (719 ft)
- Transmitter coordinates: 40°10′38.3″N 76°52′36.9″W
- Translator: See § Translators

Links
- Public license information: Public file; LMS
- Webcast: Listen live
- Website: www.935wtpa.com

WTPA-FM (93.5 MHz, "93.5 WTPA") is a commercial radio station licensed to serve Mechanicsburg, Pennsylvania. The station is owned by Cumulus Media and broadcasts a classic rock format. Its broadcast tower is located on Reesers Summit in Fairview Township, York County, at 40°10′38.3″N 76°52′36.9″W.

WTPA-FM broadcasts using HD Radio and simulcasts the Rhythmic contemporary programming of W243BR "HOT 96.5" on its HD2 subchannel.

== History ==
The Federal Communications Commission granted West Shore Broadcasting a construction permit for the station on October 5, 1977. The station was assigned the WQVE call sign by the FCC on December 5, 1977, and signed on for the first time on November 1, 1978. Studios were originally located in Mechanicsburg, with the transmitter located north of Dillsburg near Williams Grove.

The branding was changed to Magic 93 in 1982, followed by a call sign change to WKCD.

In 1985, FM104 WTPA changed call signs to WNNK and its branding to Wink 104. At that time, Jim O'Leary was an owner of WKCD, and his wife Caroline O'Leary was the General Manager at WNNK. The two organized a transfer of the WTPA call sign and the station's rock music format to 93.5. In 1987, WTPA relocated its transmitter to a location closer to Harrisburg, along with an increase in effective radiated power from 535 to 830 watts.

By the late 1990s, AMFM, Inc. owned WTPA. AMFM was purchased by Clear Channel Communications in a deal announced on October 3, 1999, and valued at $17.4 billion. As a condition of the Clear Channel-AMFM merger, the United States Department of Justice forced the new company to sell 99 radio stations in 27 markets in United States. WTPA was one, as well as Harrisburg-area stations WNNK-FM, WTCY and WNCE-FM. All went to Cumulus Media.

In 2011, the United States Department of Justice approved the purchase of Citadel Broadcasting by Cumulus, provided that Cumulus divest itself of three stations, two of which were WWKL (the former WNCE-FM) and WCAT-FM as well as the "intellectual property" of WTPA. Cumulus chose to swap the WTPA and WWKL licenses, effectively moving WTPA and its classic rock format to 92.1 and WWKL and its contemporary hit radio format to 93.5. Following the swap, the station changed its branding to Hot 93.5.

On March 15, 2018, WWKL flipped to country music as part of a format swap with Nash FM-branded WZCY-FM (the 106.7 facility concurrently took on WWKL's CHR format and Hot branding). The move reduced signal overlap with Cumulus co-owned country station WIOV-FM (which targets the Lancaster, York and Reading radio markets), and gave the CHR format wider coverage in South Central Pennsylvania. Alongside the swap, the Nash FM format from WZCY-FM segued from a hot country format, to one focusing more on country songs and performers from the 1990s and 2000s. The two stations also swapped call signs.

On December 20, 2021, WZCY-FM changed its format from country to classic rock, branded as "93.5 WTPA" under new WTPA-FM call letters, with the first song being "Welcome to the Jungle" by Guns N' Roses. (Note: The previous WTPA at 92.1 had been sold to Educational Media Foundation, becoming K-Love station WKHL, in 2018.)

== HD Radio ==
Cumulus Broadcasting began adding HD Radio equipment to some of its stations in 2005. WTPA was one of the first ten stations to receive the new technology.

The programming of WTPA-FM's second HD Radio channel is simulcast on the following translator:

Broadcast translator for WTPA-FM HD2
Call sign	Frequency	City of license	FID	ERP (W)	HAAT	Class	Transmitter coordinates	FCC info
W243BR	96.5 FM	Harrisburg, Pennsylvania	144131	200	223 m (732 ft)	D	40°10′38.3″N 76°52′36.9″W	LMS
