= WEZW =

WWKL
- Wildwood Crest, New Jersey; United States
- Broadcast area: Cape May, New Jersey
- Frequency: 93.1 MHz
- Branding: K-Love

Programming
- Format: Contemporary Christian
- Network: K-Love

Ownership
- Owner: Educational Media Foundation
- Sister stations: WLRB

History
- First air date: August 1993
- Former call signs: WDOX (1990–1999); WBNJ (1999–2003); WDTH (2003–2006); WEZW (2006-2026)
- Call sign meaning: K-Love (previously "cool" from WCDM's former branding)

Technical information
- Licensing authority: FCC
- Facility ID: 32201
- Class: A
- ERP: 4,100 watts
- HAAT: 68 meters (223 ft)
- Transmitter coordinates: 38.993°N 74.813°W

Links
- Public license information: Public file; LMS
- Webcast: Listen live
- Website: klove.com

WWKL (93.1 FM) is a radio station licensed to Wildwood Crest, New Jersey and serving the Cape May, Ocean City and Atlantic City markets. Its transmitter is located in Wildwood, New Jersey. The station is owned by Educational Media Foundation and is an affiliate of K-Love, a non-commercial Contemporary Christian network.

== History ==
The station was granted the WDOX call sign on May 17, 1990 (for construction permit holder David Oxenford). The station went on the air in August 1993 with an easy listening format, using the slogan "The Docks". This ultimately lasted for only nine months and then in May 1994 became an alternative rock station.

On March 1, 1999, the call sign was changed to WBNJ and 93.1 began to simulcast the urban AC format of WTTH (96.1 FM) in Margate City, following the transfer of the station to Margate Communications.

On October 16, 2003, the station changed its call sign to WDTH, following its sale from Margate Communications to Equity Communications in March 2002.

On September 15, 2006, the call letters were changed to WEZW. Until 2004 the WEZW calls were on WJZN, an adult standards station in Augusta, Maine. WEZW were also the former calls of what is now top 40 station WXSS in Milwaukee, Wisconsin, when that station played beautiful music in the 1970s, 1980s and 1990s.

In late October 2009, WEZW ended its simulcast of WTTH and started a Christmas music format. The format ended on December 28 of that year, and the station became Easy 93.1, airing a soft AC format. In 2010, the station was added to the Philadelphia Phillies Radio Network.

On October 17, 2011, WEZW became the first station in the United States to change over to Christmas music for the 2011 holiday season. It was again first in 2014, flipping again on the October 17, and the first for 2017, flipping on October 20. In response to the 2014 change, WEZW described its choice to flip to Christmas so early each year as a way to build notoriety for the weak-signaled station, which has an older and more conservative listener base.

On August 6, 2019, WEZW flipped to a simulcast of oldies station WMID right after the broadcast of a Phillies game. With this format change, the station also became an affiliate of The Rush Limbaugh Show. The soft AC format continued to stream online until late September.

In July 2023, the station's owners sold the station's license to Educational Media Foundation (EMF), owner of the K-Love contemporary Christian music network. In mid-November, following the sale to EMF, the station went silent before returning to the air with new programing on November 28, 2023.

On October 27, 2026, the call letters were changed from WEZW to WWKL in exchange with WCDM.
