= Susquehanna Valley Mall =

- Location: Selinsgrove, Pennsylvania, U.S.
- Coordinates: 40°49′32″N 76°50′55″W
- Address: One Susquehanna Valley Mall Drive, Selinsgrove, PA 17870
- Opened: 1978
- Developer: Kravitz Properties
- Manager: Kohan Retail Investment Group
- Owner: Susquehanna Mall Realty Holdings (Kohan Retail Investment Group)
- Num. of stores: 66 (at peak)
- Num. of anchor tenants: 4
- Floor area: 744,900 sq. ft.
- Website: susquehannavalleymall.com

Susquehanna Valley Mall is a shopping mall outside of Selinsgrove, Pennsylvania on US 11/US 15. It is anchored by Boscov's, Family Practice Center, Flea Flickers, and Redeemer Fellowship Church. Several outparcels include an AMC Theatres and Hobby Lobby.

== History (1977–2014) ==
Boscov's opened in 1977, prior to the mall. Susquehanna Valley Mall opened on September 26, 1978 with 400,000 sq. ft. of space and three anchors including Bon-Ton and Boscov's. J. C. Penney became an anchor 10 months after the mall opened. Susquehanna Valley Mall expanded in 1998 and added a fourth anchor, Sears, along with additional stores. The mall was the largest retail project to occur in the Susquehanna Valley for 30 years until PREIT opened the Monroe Marketplace in 2008.

Hollister opened in December 2008, while BMoss announced its closing. KB Toys closed in early 2009, while Golden Wok and Sprint opened. Two women were carjacked from the mall parking lot in May 2009, with the carjacker later turning himself in. Arby's suffered a grease fire in October 2009. Susquehanna Valley Mall and many of its tenants filed county tax appeals in 2009. Waldenbooks closed in 2011, with Books-A-Million replacing it in October. Max Media opened a radio studio in 2011. The Courtyard Theater opened in 2013 and presented live theater in the mall. In June 2014, a fatal car accident occurred in the mall's parking lot.

== Decline (2015–2018) ==
Gap closed in January 2015 and Christopher & Banks moved to the Monroe Marketplace. J. C. Penney closed in April 2015. RadioShack and Deb Shops also closed in 2015. The Hallmark shop began closing sales in late June 2016. Aeropostale began closing sales in September 2016. In December 2016, the Courtyard Theatre and Limitless Mobile both closed. Additional stores that closed in late 2016 include Sprint and Things Remembered. Boscov's Furniture Outlet opened in March 2017, occupying the former Gap. Sears closed in March 2017. Justice closed in April, while Cricket Wireless opened in June 2017. All In Adventures and Stadium Studio opened in 2017, while Crazy 8, Subway, and TCBY closed.

The Bon-Ton closed in late April 2018, leaving Boscov's as the mall's only remaining anchor. Higher Hope Church used the former J. C. Penney for their meetings. Family Practice Center took over the former Sears space, and remodeled it into a clinic with a 50-year lease. The former Sears building was sold to D&C Realty, with the mall retaining ownership of the land underneath, for $1.5 million. Re-purposing of the former Sears to Family Practice Center took several years and began in Fall 2018, with no planned exterior changes to the building.

== Ownership change (2019–2024) ==
Susquehanna Valley Mall went to sheriff's sale on August 9, 2019. Its owners, Susquehanna Valley Mall Associates, owed $33.4 million to the U.S. Bank National Association. The mall was purchased by the U.S. Bank National Association for $5.25 million. Parts of the Family Practice Center opened in February 2020. Geisinger Health System leased space from Family Practice Center for an urgent care clinic in May 2020. Geisinger's Convenient Care Plus Clinic opened in March 2021. Flea Flickers in 2023 leased the former Bon-Ton space for storage. Evangelical Community Hospital opened a practice in August 2023.

Susquehanna Valley Mall was sold in October 2025 for $9,175,000 to the Kohan Retail Investment Group, doing business under the name Susquehanna Mall Realty Holdings.

== Notoriety ==
The Murder of Troy LaFerrara in 2013 and Lori Auker in 1989 both began in the parking lot of the Mall. The 94KX Cares for Kids Radiothon while being held at the Susquehanna Valley Mall has raised $45,000 in 2012, $40,721 in 2013, and $41,678 in 2014. It benefits the Janet Weis Children's Hospital at Geisinger Medical Center through Children's Miracle Network.

== See also ==
- List of shopping malls in Pennsylvania
