= WCDI =

Radio station in Elizabethville, Pennsylvania

- Elizabethville, Pennsylvania; United States
- Broadcast area: Harrisburg–Carlisle metropolitan area
- Frequency: 100.5 MHz

Programming
- Format: Christian radio
- Affiliations: Family Life Network

Ownership
- Owner: Family Life Network (sale to Seven Mountains Media pending); (Family Life Ministries, LLC)
- Sister stations: WCDF; WCDM

History
- First air date: December 7, 1989
- Former call signs: WLIZ (1989–1990); WYGL-FM (1990–2016); WQBG (2016–2026); WCDM (February–September 2026)
- Call sign meaning: With Christ Discover ...

Technical information
- Licensing authority: FCC
- Facility ID: 63837
- Class: A
- ERP: 1,100 watts
- HAAT: 231.4 meters (759 ft)
- Transmitter coordinates: 40°18′19.3″N 77°0′26.9″W

Links
- Public license information: Public file; LMS
- Website: www.familylife.org

WCDI (100.5 MHz) is a radio station licensed to Elizabethville, Pennsylvania, United States, and serving the Harrisburg–Carlisle metropolitan area. The station is part of the Family Life Network and broadcasts from a transmitter in Marysville.

== History ==
The station's license was granted in 1988, as WLIZ, and officially signed on-air on December 7, 1989 under Great Scott Broadcasting’s ownership.

In March 1990, WLIZ was sold to Sunair Communications Inc. The station later changed its call sign to WYGL-FM.

In July 2003, Sunair Communications sold its Pennsylvania radio cluster (including WYGL-FM) to Max Media for $7.5 million. The sale was completed in February 2004.

On August 12, 2015, Max Media announced that it would sell its Pennsylvania radio stations to Seven Mountains Media for $3.8 million. The sale was completed on November 5. In February 2016, it joined Seven Mountains' "Bigfoot Country" format, along with WRBG and WCFT-FM.

In August 2025, Seven Mountains Media announced that they would sell WQBG to Family Life Ministries for $400,000, and had a pending application to move to Carroll Township where it would cover Harrisburg. The sale was completed on January 30, 2026.

On February 11, 2026, WQBG changed its call sign to WCDM. It changed again on September 18, 2026, to WCDI when the former WWKL became WCDM.

On October 2, 2026, it was announced that Family Life Ministries would sell WCDI back to Seven Mountains for $300,000.
