= Hummels Wharf, Pennsylvania =

Unincorporated community in Pennsylvania, US

Hummels Wharf
- Census-designated place
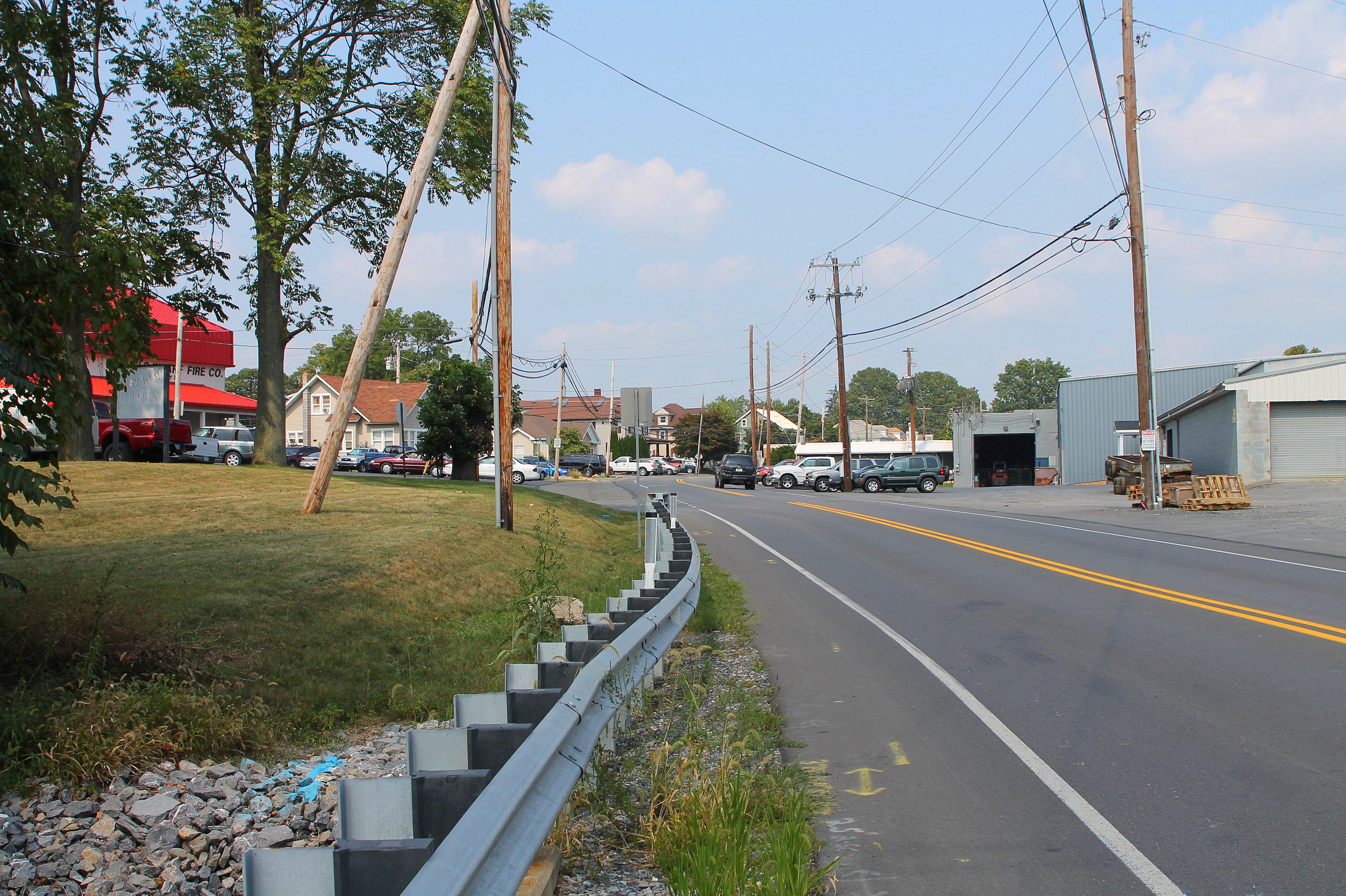
- North Old Trail in Hummels Wharf

- Location within the U.S. state of Pennsylvania
- Coordinates: 40°50′5″N 76°50′12″W
- Country: United States
- State: Pennsylvania
- County: Snyder
- Township: Monroe

Area
  - Total: 0.80 sq mi (2.07 km^{2})
  - Land: 0.79 sq mi (2.04 km^{2})
  - Water: 0.0077 sq mi (0.02 km^{2})

Population (2020)
  - Total: 1,334
  - Density: 1,693/sq mi (653.5/km^{2})
- Time zone: UTC-5 (Eastern (EST))
  - Summer (DST): UTC-4 (EDT)
- ZIP code: 17870
- Area codes: 272 and 570
- FIPS code: 42-36240

Hummels Wharf is a census-designated place (CDP) in Monroe Township, Snyder County, Pennsylvania, United States. The population was 641 at the 2000 census.

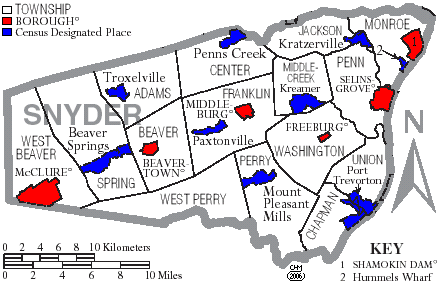
Map of Snyder County, Pennsylvania with Municipal Labels showing Boroughs (red), Townships (white), and Census-designated places (blue).

== Geography ==
Hummels Wharf is located at 40°50′5″N 76°50′12″W (40.834638, -76.836753).

According to the United States Census Bureau, the CDP has a total area of 0.3 square miles (0.78 km^{2}), all land.

== Demographics ==
Historical population
Census	Pop.	Note	%±
2020	1,334		—
U.S. Decennial Census

As of the census of 2000, there were 641 people, 314 households, and 184 families residing in the CDP. The population density was 2,254.1 inhabitants per square mile (870.3/km^{2}). There were 336 housing units at an average density of 1,181.5 per square mile (456.2/km^{2}). The racial makeup of the CDP was 97.04% White, 0.47% African American, 1.25% Asian, 0.94% from other races, and 0.31% from two or more races. Hispanic or Latino of any race were 0.94% of the population.

There were 314 households, out of which 24.5% had children under the age of 18 living with them, 48.7% were married couples living together, 6.4% had a female householder with no husband present, and 41.1% were non-families. 36.9% of all households were made up of individuals, and 16.2% had someone living alone who was 65 years of age or older. The average household size was 2.04 and the average family size was 2.63.

In the CDP, the population was spread out, with 19.2% under the age of 18, 4.7% from 18 to 24, 29.5% from 25 to 44, 25.1% from 45 to 64, and 21.5% who were 65 years of age or older. The median age was 43 years. For every 100 females, there were 96.6 males. For every 100 females age 18 and over, there were 93.3 males.

The median income for a household in the CDP was $24,600, and the median income for a family was $25,781. Males had a median income of $38,942 versus $25,109 for females. The per capita income for the CDP was $19,218. About 14.1% of families and 10.2% of the population were below the poverty line, including 13.8% of those under age 18 and 17.3% of those age 65 or over.

== Government ==
Hummels Wharf is located in the 108th House District and the 27th Senate District of the Pennsylvania General Assembly. With regards to the U.S. House of Representatives, residents are in Pennsylvania's 10th congressional district. In the United States each state is represented in the United States Senate by two at large senators.

== See also ==
- Hummelstown, Pennsylvania
