= Joey Julius =

American football player (born 1995)

Personal information
- Born: March 26, 1995 (age 31); Milwaukee, Wisconsin, U.S.
- Listed height: 5 ft 10 in (1.78 m)
- Listed weight: 258 lb (117 kg)

Career information
- High school: Lower Dauphin High School
- College: Penn State (2014–2016)

Awards and highlights
- BTN.com All-Freshman Team (2015)

Joseph Thomas Julius (born March 26, 1995) is a former college football kicker for the Penn State Nittany Lions.

== Early life ==
Julius was born in Milwaukee, Wisconsin and grew up in Hummelstown, Pennsylvania, where he played football for Lower Dauphin High School. He lettered four times as a punter and kicker, additionally playing defensive line, and was a two-time all-state selection, and he was named to the USA Today All-Pennsylvania Team.

== College career ==
As a redshirt freshman at Penn St. in 2015, Julius led the Big Ten and was number 21 nationally with an .833 field goal percentage, and he was selected to the BTN.com All-Freshman Team. At 258 pounds, ESPN called Julius the "hardest-hitting kicker in college football".

Julius made national headlines and received a "cult following" for his powerful hits against opposing players on kickoffs, with most videos going viral. Because of Julius' reputation for taking down opposing players, he himself became a target of blockers, as several players "returned the favor". Fans began calling him "Big Toe Joe".

It was reported in July 2017, that Julius left the Penn State program. College football writer Barrett Sallee wrote, that Julius' "talents will be missed on the field in 2017, but he has more important challenges to face moving forward. Hopefully he attacks them with the same kind of tenacity that he did while storming downfield on kickoffs."

== Eating disorder ==
On October 2, 2016, Julius posted on his Facebook that after experiencing anxiety, depression, and weight gain, that he had been suffering from an eating disorder referred to as binge eating for more than eleven years. He went public in order to help others who might struggle with something similar, and he urged them to immediately contact him so he could help them. Julius' personal story made international headlines, including in the Los Angeles Times, The Washington Post, and ABC News.

In May 2017, Julius re-entered treatment for an eating disorder, posting on Facebook that he had been struggling for a couple of months, and that it "got to the point where I had to return to St. Louis to seek further treatment at the McCallum place". He added that "recovery is a wonderful and beautiful thing" and he hoped that other people with similar struggles would seek help. Julius posted, "There is light at the end of the tunnel. It is just a very long tunnel." Friends and teammates came forward with praise for Julius's openness. Former teammate and best friend, Matt Zanellato said, "It's groundbreaking. I think he's giving a community a role model. I can only imagine how many people around the country his story has touched."

As of July 24, 2017, it was reported by head coach James Franklin, that Julius was removed from the Penn State Football roster and is in healthy recovery.

== Personal life ==
Joey Julius was featured on the Shed Talk podcast in 2020 in Harrisburg, PA. At the time of the interview, he was employed at a Chevrolet dealership in Lancaster, Pennsylvania.
