= Enoch Matlack House =

Historic house in Pennsylvania, United States

- U.S. National Register of Historic Places
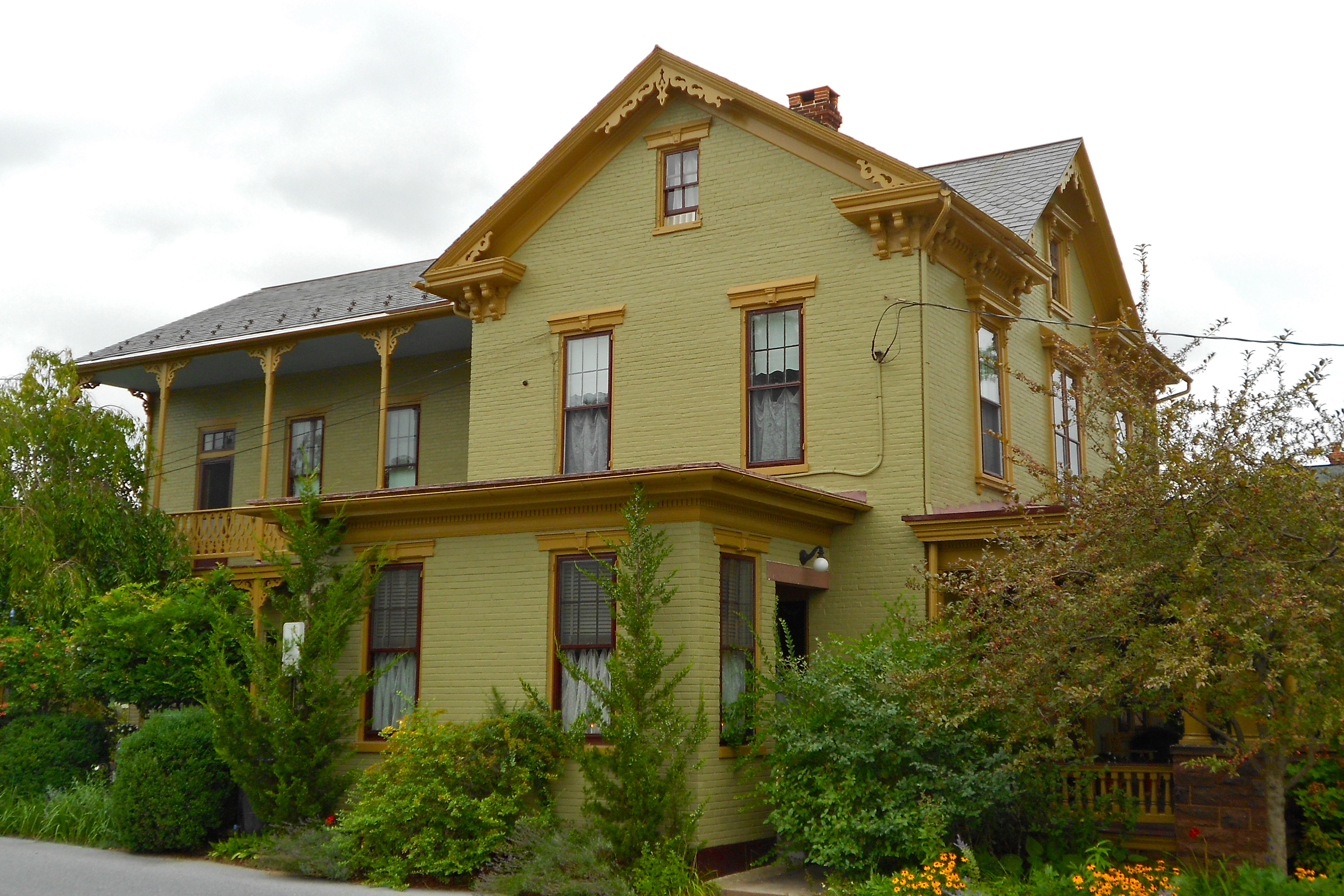
- Enoch Matlack House, August 2013

- Location within Pennsylvania Location within the United States
- Location: 250 E. Main St., Hummelstown, Pennsylvania
- Coordinates: 40°15′57″N 76°42′8″W
- Area: 0.3 acres (0.12 ha)
- Built: 1872
- NRHP reference No.: 79002219
- Added to NRHP: June 22, 1979

Enoch Matlack House is a historic home located at Hummelstown, Dauphin County, Pennsylvania, United States. It was built in 1872, and is a 2 1/2-story, T-shaped brick building, with a two-story rear section. It has a cross-gable roof. On each side of the rear section are second story balconies. A porch is along the front and east facades.

It was added to the National Register of Historic Places in 1979.
