= Dr. William Henderson House =

Historic house in Pennsylvania, United States

- U.S. National Register of Historic Places
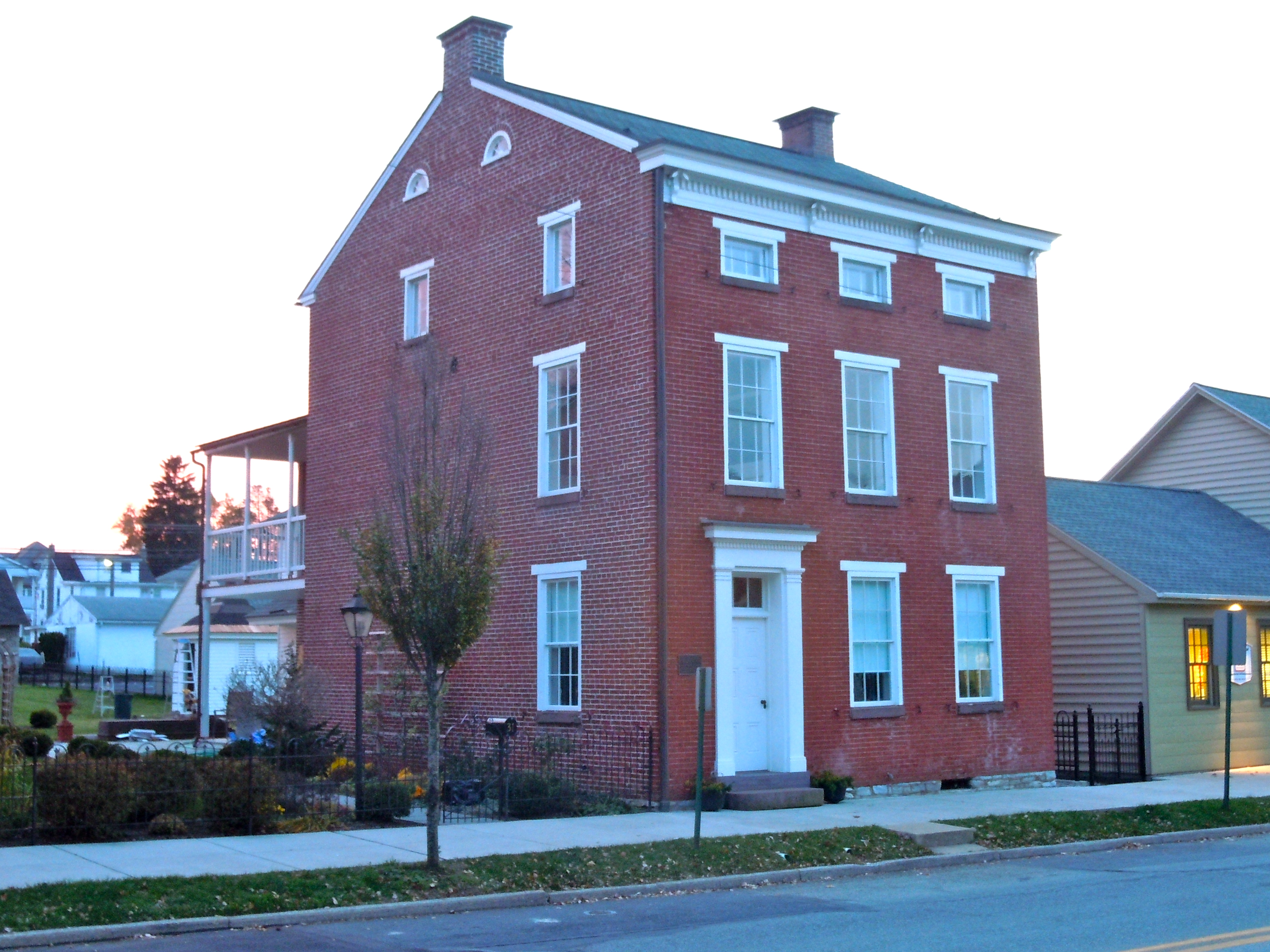
- Henderson House, November 2011

- Location within Pennsylvania Location within the United States
- Location: 31 E. Main St., Hummelstown, Pennsylvania
- Coordinates: 40°15′54″N 76°42′26″W
- Area: 0.3 acres (0.12 ha)
- Built: 1829
- Built by: Dierdorf & Pamler
- Architectural style: Federal
- NRHP reference No.: 79002218
- Added to NRHP: May 14, 1979

Dr. William Henderson House, also known as the Fox House, is a historic home located at Hummelstown, Pennsylvania, United States. It was built in 1854, and is a three-story, brick style townhouse on a stone foundation. It has brownstone window sills and stoop. There is a three-story rear extension and, on that, a one-story frame addition dated to 1918.

It was added to the National Register of Historic Places in 1979.
