= Zion Lutheran Church and Graveyard =

Historic church in Pennsylvania, United States

- U.S. National Register of Historic Places
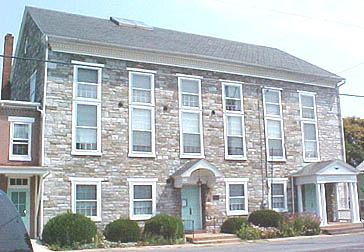
- Front of the church

- Location within Pennsylvania Location within the United States
- Location: Rosanna St., Hummelstown, Pennsylvania
- Coordinates: 40°15′58″N 76°42′39″W
- Area: 1 acre (0.40 ha)
- Built: 1815
- NRHP reference No.: 79002220
- Added to NRHP: March 29, 1979

Zion Lutheran Church and Graveyard is a historic church on Rosanna Street in Hummelstown, Pennsylvania, USA.

It was built in 1815 and added to the National Register of Historic Places in 1979.
