= Elizabeth "Harriot" Wilson =

American executed for murder (1762–1786)

Title page artwork from the first edition of The Pennsylvania Hermit, ca. 1838. Note William approaching on horseback, calling, "A pardon."

Elizabeth Wilson (c. 1762 – January 3, 1786) was an American whose execution by hanging for the purported murder of her children in southeastern Pennsylvania during the immediate post-Revolutionary War period made her a folklore figure in the late eighteenth and early nineteenth century. Although her responsibility for the children's deaths had not been definitively established, the hanging was carried out and a stay of execution, granted by the state and entrusted to her brother, William, was not delivered in time to stop the execution. There was tremendous popular interest in her story, which quickly evolved into a tale of moral failing and divine redemption. Following his sister's death, William became a recluse, popularly known as The Pennsylvania Hermit.

In some sources, William and Elizabeth are referred to as Amos Wilson and Harriot Wilson. However, the historical record leaves no doubt that the Hermit and his sister were named William and Elizabeth. The origin of these "alternate" names has never been fully explained.

Many key elements of the Wilsons' saga are documented in the records of the Chester County Courts and the Commonwealth of Pennsylvania. However, the story quickly became a part of local folklore and was embellished by generations of storytellers. It is possible to note which elements of the tale are a part of the historical record and which might be considered suspect. However, "the Wilson Story" might best be considered historical fiction, as the popular tale incorporates elements of both, and even scholarly discussions of the events are at odds regarding certain details. The following is a synthesis of numerous, often conflicting sources and is best regarded as historical fiction.

== Early life ==
Very little background information has survived regarding the Wilson family. According to one account, William and Elizabeth's father was a farmer named John Wilson. John's first wife, and the children's mother, was also named Elizabeth.

Sources are divided regarding Elizabeth's age. Some report that she was nineteen when she died (born ca. 1766), others that she was twenty-seven (born ca. 1758). There is no record of other siblings, and some accounts specify that Elizabeth was her parents' only daughter and William their only son. Elizabeth was said to have been born in East Marlborough Township, in central Chester County.

(Prior to 1789, Chester County included all of present-day Delaware County, and Chester was the county seat. Chester then served as the seat of Delaware County until the seat was moved to Media in 1851.)

The Wilson family lived in Chester County, most likely in East Bradford or West Bradford Township. Theirs was a farm family of modest means but solid reputation. During the American Revolution, they sided with the British, and much of their property was confiscated by American forces., Mrs. Wilson died while the children were still young. Their father later remarried, but his second wife did not care for her stepchildren. She encouraged their father to send them away as soon as they were of age.

== "The Victim of Seduction!" ==
At sixteen, William was apprenticed to a stone carver in Lancaster County. Elizabeth's activities after leaving her father's house are less certain. Some accounts tell that she was sent to work at the Indian Queen Tavern in Philadelphia. Others suggest that she was a social butterfly who simply frequented the Indian Queen. Some portray her as a chaste and virtuous country girl, a devout Christian who made a terrible mistake. Others describe her as much more worldly, and one even reports another, earlier, out-of-wedlock pregnancy that ended in stillbirth. In early 1784 a George Magoleher was tried in Chester after being arrested "for fouling upon the body of Elizabeth Wilson," although it is not certain that this Elizabeth was the Hermit's sister. (Court documents reveal that this Elizabeth's father was named Thomas Wilson.) The Faithful Narrative also includes a lurid jailhouse confession attributed to Elizabeth in which she admits to several out-of-wedlock pregnancies.

Elizabeth is invariably described as exceedingly beautiful and always surrounded by admirers, but as with other portions of her tale, there are several versions of how she met her seducer. In one, she was invited to a wedding in nearby Hock-Hossing (perhaps Hockessin in Delaware), where she met a friend of the groom. In several others, she met a man named "Smith," either a native of Philadelphia or an officer from New Jersey. In still others, she met a man identified as either "Captain D_____" or Joseph Deshong at the Indian Queen. Deshong was alternately an American officer or the Sheriff of Sussex County, New Jersey. Whatever his name or his origin, the cad manipulated Elizabeth with false promises of marriage and "succeeded in depriving her of all that could render her respectable in the eyes of the world." He then disappeared, leaving Elizabeth pregnant. In one telling she learns that her former lover has taken up with a wealthy widow in another city, in another that he was already married to another woman. Elizabeth remained at the Indian Queen, and as her pregnancy became obvious, she became the focus of scorn and gossip. Eventually, her presence became too great an embarrassment, and she was made to leave.

She hitched a ride on a farm wagon and headed back to her father's house. (It is also said that she made the journey on foot, taking a week to reach her destination.) In one version her children were born in a stranger's house along the way, but certainly the more dramatic account has her arriving at her father's home still in the throes of labor. When she first appeared there, she was so careworn, and exhausted by pregnancy and the process of childbirth, that her parents did not immediately recognize her. During the night, Elizabeth gave birth to twin sons.

== Murder ==
As soon as she was well enough to travel, Elizabeth returned to Philadelphia in search of her babies' father, whom she found at the Indian Queen. He feigned happiness at seeing her and again promised that they would be married. Elizabeth returned home and several days later headed out to meet her imagined groom. She set out on the road to Newtown Square (most likely the present-day West Chester Pike). She rode part of the way with a neighbor, who left her sitting on a rock, nursing her babies. (The day is often described as a Sunday, with her parents leaving to attend church, but those sources that mention a specific date give 12 October 1784, a Thursday.) It was anywhere from ten days to ten weeks following the children's birth.

Elizabeth was not seen again for as much as a week, and when she reappeared she was disheveled and incoherent and her children were nowhere to be seen. In the coming days or weeks a gruesome discovery was made: a hunter found the bodies of Elizabeth's twins hidden in the woods. The babies were immediately identified, and Elizabeth was quickly arrested. Several newspapers reported that Elizabeth's arrest took place in late December, 1784, roughly two and a half months after her children's deaths. Other accounts suggest that the chain of events (murder, discovery, and arrest) took place over a much shorter period.

Several locations are given for the crime scene: along Street Road (S.R. 926), approximately 4 km (2.5 mi) west of Newtown Square; along Edgemont Road above Street Road; near the road from Brandywine to West Chester (perhaps today's Horseshoe Pike); and, most specifically, south of Goshen Street Road in East Bradford Township, on the west side of a small rivulet.

An article in the 25 January 1785 Portsmouth, New Hampshire, Mercury and General Advertiser reported under a 5 January dateline that a woman had been arrested 'about a week ago', and that 'she denies' the murder 'but acknowledged having placed the children by the road-side, in order that any person passing that way, in order that any person passing that way, and who had humanity enough, might take them up.'

== Trial ==
Elizabeth Wilson was charged with the "murder of her Two illegitimate Male Children" and imprisoned in the city of Chester's 4th Street jail.

Her trial began in June, 1785 and was held in the court house in Chester. Built in 1724, the Chester courthouse is still standing and is the oldest public building still in continuous use in the United States. The judge was William Augustus Atlee. Atlee was a Justice of the Supreme Court of Pennsylvania, and at that time Supreme Court justices also served on the county-level Courts of oyer and terminer, making a regular circuit of the counties to hear trials for high crimes and appeals. It was in this latter capacity that Atlee presided over Elizabeth Wilson's trial.

When asked to enter a plea, Elizabeth did not respond; Judge Atlee entered a plea of "not guilty" on her behalf. In fact, at no time during the trial did Elizabeth speak in her own defense. Her counsel was unsure how to proceed, given his client's silence. He requested that the trial be postponed until the fall session, and the judge agreed.

Elizabeth Wilson's trial resumed in October 1785. Attorney General Bradford's case was built primarily on circumstantial evidence, but Elizabeth did not refute any of the charges against her. The jury deliberated several hours before returning their verdict. Many jurors felt sympathetic toward Elizabeth, but they were charged to decide the case based on the evidence presented. Their decision was "guilty of murder in the first degree." Atlee had also become sympathetic, but he, too, was bound to act according to the evidence presented in court. He had little choice but to sentence Elizabeth to death by hanging.

The date for the execution was set for 7 December 1785.

== Confession and reprieve ==
After the judge passed sentence, Elizabeth's parents abandoned her. Throughout the trial and the preceding events, William Wilson had remained at work in Lancaster, unaware of his sister's predicament. But when Elizabeth was condemned to death, William mysteriously announced that he was needed in Chester and would have to leave his job. He arrived at the jail on 3 December 1785. After recovering from the shock of seeing her brother so unexpectedly Elizabeth was finally willing to relate the details surrounding her children's murder.

William hastily assembled a group of respected officials, including Judge Atlee, to witness Elizabeth's confession. Elizabeth explained that her seducer had agreed to meet her in Newtown Square. However, he unexpectedly met her in a wood about 3 km (1.9 mi) west of the town. He asked to see the babies, claiming that he wanted to see whether they resembled him. He ordered Elizabeth to kill the children and when she refused he trampled them to death. He then held a pistol to Elizabeth's chest and made her swear that she would never reveal what he had done.

The confession was signed by the witnesses. William presented it to the Supreme Executive Council on 6 Dec 1785. The President of the Council was Benjamin Franklin, and its Vice President was Charles Biddle (1745–1821). Biddle's journal includes a brief discussion of the Wilson case and, in addition to court and Council records, is one of the more reputable sources regarding the matter. The Council had previously discussed Elizabeth's sentence on 1 November 1785 and now acted quickly to order that the execution be postponed until 3 January 1786 to allow them more time in which to discuss the case.

In the meantime, William went in search of his sister's erstwhile lover, but when he found him on a New Jersey farm he denied ever having known Elizabeth. William then began to seek out witnesses who could link the man with Philadelphia and his sister. He was successful in compiling a list of several people, but he became ill around Christmas and spent some time recuperating at a friend's home in Philadelphia.

Upon his next visit to the Chester jail, he was horrified to learn that Elizabeth's execution was scheduled for the following day. During his illness he had lost track of time and believed that it was 1 January, rather than 2 January.

William rode to Franklin's home to request another postponement of Elizabeth's sentence but had to wait several hours to see him. Franklin felt that it was improper for him to act and referred William to Vice President Biddle. William found Biddle at the State House. Biddle wrote the order, "Do not execute Wilson until you hear further from Council," knowing that the members of the Executive Council were sympathetic towards Elizabeth and intended to grant a full respite.

With Biddle's pardon in hand, William began the 24 km (15 mi) ride to Chester. He approached the Middle Ferry across the Schuylkill River. Heavy rain had made the river dangerously high and choked it with ice and debris; the ferry was not in operation. In desperation, he drove his horse into the icy water. The animal struggled against the current but drowned just 50 ft (15 m) from the opposite shore. William swam the rest of the way, and by the time he reached dry land he was approximately 3.5 km (2.2 mi) downstream from where he'd entered the water. William found another horse and continued to Chester.

== Execution ==
Meanwhile, officials in Chester reluctantly began preparations for Elizabeth's execution. Elizabeth spent the morning with several clergymen and received holy communion. At ten-thirty she was moved from the jail to Hangman's Lot. (The present-day site is a triangular lot at the intersection of Edgmont and Providence Avenues near Crozer-Chester Medical Center. The lot itself is now a Day's Inn). A wild cherry tree grew there, with a strong branch that grew out horizontally from the trunk and to which ropes were tied.

Several old illustrations of Elizabeth Wilson's hanging show a scaffold and gallows, but at that time such structures were not in widespread use. Rather, the condemned were "swung off." They were placed atop a ladder or cart (the latter being the case in Chester); one end of the rope was tied most likely to a convenient tree branch and the other, of course, placed around the victim's neck; the condemned was then pushed from his perch, or the support was quickly pulled from beneath him. Executions in this manner were often protracted, gruesome affairs, resulting in a slow death by asphyxiation rather than a quickly-broken neck, and hanging was considered (as it has been throughout history) one of the most shameful methods of capital punishment. While the execution of women has always been relatively uncommon, there were many instances in this period of women who were hanged for the murders of their "bastard children."

The sheriff of Chester (given as either Ezekiel Leonard or William Gibbons) was one of many who had come to believe that Elizabeth was innocent and who, following her confession, suspected that she might be pardoned. He stationed flagmen at intervals along the Queens Highway (4th Street), leading from Philadelphia, who could signal if William were coming with a pardon. Those assembled watched expectantly for a signal but none was seen. Noon arrived, and by law the sheriff could wait no longer. The order was given and the cart was pulled from beneath Elizabeth Wilson's feet. She did not die outright but showed little sign of struggle. Several long moments passed before the crowd noticed white flags waving along the road from Philadelphia.

William rode to Hangman's Lot calling, "A pardon! A pardon!" His horse reared at the sight of Elizabeth's body, throwing him to the muddy ground beneath his sister. The sheriff quickly cut the rope and tried frantically to revive Elizabeth, but it was too late to save her. Varying accounts state that William arrived anywhere from mere moments to twenty-three minutes too late to deliver Biddle's stay of execution and save his sister's life. (The unreliability of this form of hanging may account for the need to have left Elizabeth hanging for twenty-three minutes —to ensure that she was, in fact, dead.)

A version of the same scene from a later edition of The Pennsylvania Hermit. Note the anachronistic dress of the individuals portrayed.

Biddle later wrote, "For my own part, I firmly believed her innocent....The next day when Council met, and we heard of the execution, it gave uneasiness to many of the members, all of whom were against her being executed."

== Elizabeth Wilson in popular culture ==
=== Contemporary accounts ===
As previously noted, the story of the children's murder and Elizabeth's arrest was reported at least as far away as New Hampshire.

Only two days after Elizabeth's execution, a printer in Philadelphia published the first version of The Faithful Narrative of Elizabeth Wilson. By the end of the year, at least three (and as many as six) other editions were published in the northeast U.S. At least four editions of The Faithful Narrative are extant and several other editions are alluded to in secondary sources. The four known editions are practically identical, the only discrepancy being that one describes the children's murder as being eight days after their births, while the others report eight weeks. There is a liberal mixture of historical fact and melodrama, the latter in the form of extended monologues attributed to Elizabeth, as well as the texts of several letters supposedly written in her cell and "discovered" after her death.

In addition to the various Narratives, a Boston printer, Ezekiel Russell, published …Elegy &c., a poetic telling of Elizabeth's story; it survives only as a fragment. This was essentially an advertisement for another Russell publication, a crime magazine titled The American Bloody Register, the fourth issue of which dealt with the Wilson case; no copies of the Register are known to have survived. Another Boston printer published The Victim of Seduction!, marking perhaps the first use of the name Harriot in place of Elizabeth. (While the date of Victim is unknown it appears to predate The Pennsylvania Hermit, another early source of the names Amos and Harriot.) New editions of The Faithful Narrative continued to appear, the latest in 1807.

From a publishing standpoint, the interest in Elizabeth's case was unprecedented in the new nation, and the sentimental features of many of the accounts were calculated to appeal to female readers, whose numbers increased dramatically following the Revolution.

After Elizabeth's death, her brother William withdrew from society. After wandering for several years he took up residence in a cave near Hummelstown, Pennsylvania. He died there in 1821. In the late 1830s, The Pennsylvania Hermit: A Narrative of the Extraordinary Life of Amos Wilson was published. It is a twenty-four page pamphlet in two parts. The first, titled The Life of Amos Wilson, &c., is a brief telling of the Wilsons' story. The writer describes himself as William's friend and claims to have visited him the night before he died. As such, the book is often assumed to be authoritative, yet it contains numerous and often glaring errors. It is also another early source of the 'alternate' names, Amos and Harriot.

=== Myth and morality ===
The tragic, lurid tale of William and Elizabeth Wilson quickly became familiar throughout the Philadelphia area and was told and retold in local papers throughout the 19th and 20th Centuries. Some themes, such as the broken marriage promise, are nearly universal, while many others exist in a single source and are at odds with all other versions of the tale, and with the historical record. In addition to the discrepancies noted above, The Pennsylvania Hermit tells that Elizabeth gave birth to a single child whom she killed immediately after birth. In this version, her jailhouse confession was simply an acknowledgement of guilt and of her sinful nature. One story in a Chester newspaper made repeated reference to a small blue stool on which William, as a boy, had carved the initials "E & W." Predating Charles Foster Kane's Rosebud by a century, the stool served as a reminder of a more innocent time as Elizabeth awaited execution. Another version claims that after William arrived at Benjamin Franklin's home, Franklin immediately convened a special late-night session of the Executive Council and all necessary work related to the pardon was completed within minutes; this is dramatically at odds with the details provided by the vice president of that Council.

As mentioned previously, the Wilsons' story was sometimes used to teach lessons in traditional morality. The Life of Amos Wilson contains the passage, "You see by the foregoing pages the gradation of evils dependent on a departure from...dignified modesty." Readers are admonished to "(t)urn your attention to those houses of debauchery where Vice reigns triumphant, and on whom poor mourning Virtue sheds a tear of pity." Several sources also include dramatic, extended quotes attributed to William and Elizabeth. Again, these passages sometimes seem to have more to do with moral instruction than with relating the factual story of William and Elizabeth Wilson, and as many exist only in a single source their authenticity must be viewed skeptically.

=== Ghost stories ===
The Wilsons' story inevitably inspired several ghost stories.

For many years local folks claimed to see and hear a spectral horseman galloping across Chester and Delaware Counties and up to the old jail. This story became well known after William became a recluse —but long before he actually died.

When trees were cleared to make a parking lot for Indian Echo Caverns (the name given to William's hermitage on its development as a tourist attraction), it was said that the newly opened space revealed Elizabeth Wilson's wandering spirit. This ghost story is unusual in that, while living, Elizabeth never set foot anywhere near the area she was alleged to haunt.

More poignant are tales from East Bradford Township of a female spirit walking through the woods where (according to some sources) the bodies of Elizabeth's children were discovered, looking for something lost beneath the leaves.

While early storytelling focused on Elizabeth's saga and the moral implications of her actions, the current focus seems to be on the sensational aspects of William's ride and Elizabeth's execution and on the strange circumstances of William's life in the cave. As such, the story is sometimes resurrected by local media in connection with Halloween observances or as part of "strange but true" features.

== See also ==
- Rush Griffin
- Red Barn Murder
- The Newgate Calendar

== Sources ==
- Teeters, Negley K (1963). Scaffold and Chair: a Compilation of their use in Pennsylvania 1682-1962. Philadelphia: Pennsylvania Prison Society.
- Smith, Merril D (1999). Unnatural Mothers: Infanticide, Motherhood, and Class in the Mid-Atlantic, 1730-1830. In Christine Daniels and Michael V. Kennedy (eds.) Over the Threshold: Intimate Violence in Early America. New York: Routledge.
