= Indian Echo Caverns =

Cave in Pennsylvania, United States

Coordinates: 40.2529°N 76.7168°W

- Wilson Cave, Hummelstown Cave, Stoverdale Cave, Giant's Cave, Indian Cave, and Indian Echo Cave
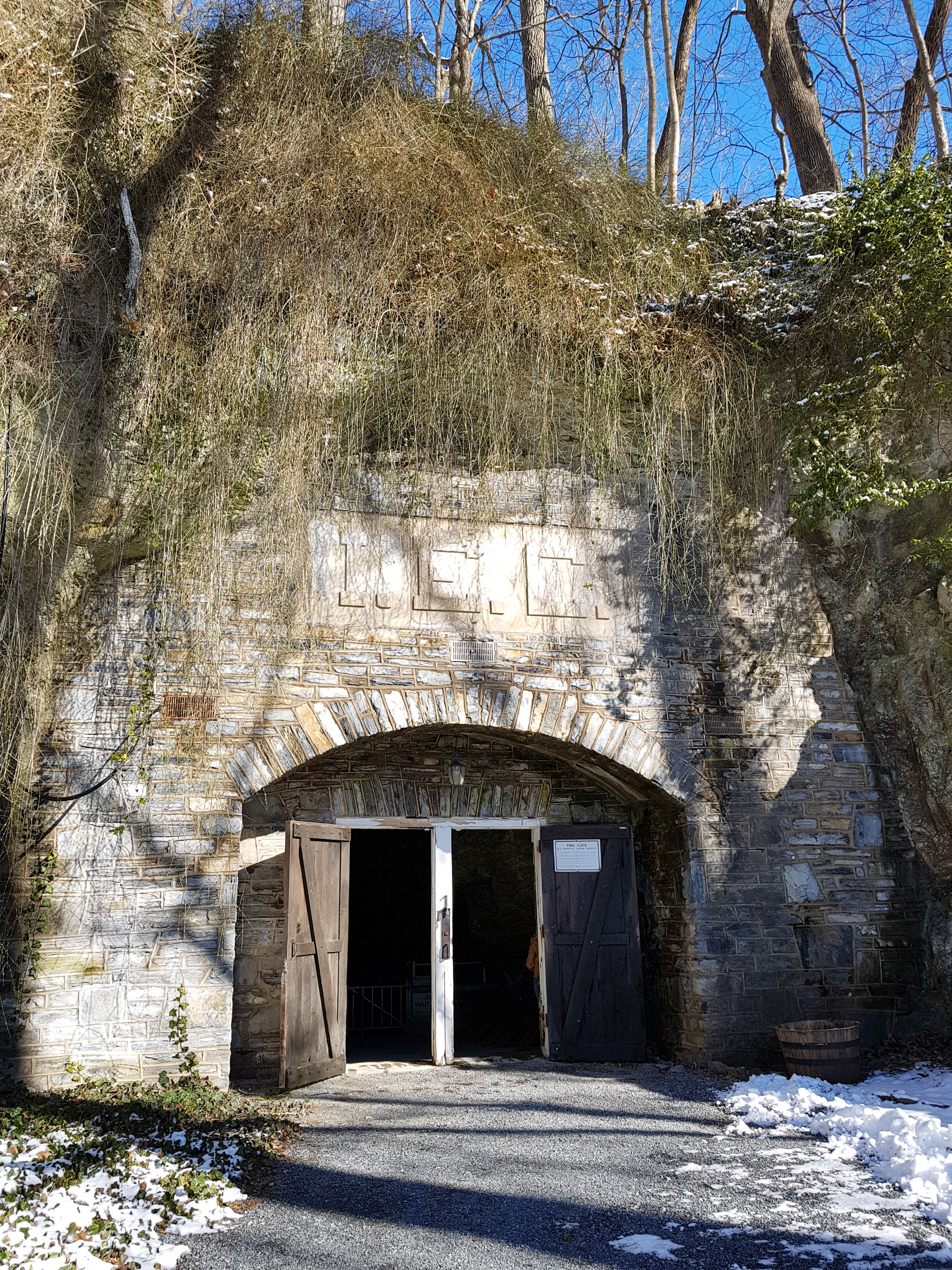
- Entrance to the cave
- Interactive map of Indian Echo Caverns
- Location: Derry Township
- Discovery: c. 1802
- Geology: Beekmantown limestone
- Entrances: 2 (1 used)
- Access: public

Indian Echo Caverns is a historic show cave in Derry Township, Dauphin County near Hershey and Hummelstown, Pennsylvania in the United States. The caverns were mentioned in an article by the Philadelphia Philosophical Society as early as the 1700s.

The limestone cave tourist destination has been considered "a living cave" because its formations continue to grow. It is open for the public to visit daily via guided tour, except for Thanksgiving, Christmas and New Year's Day. Hours vary by season, and admission rates vary by age.

== Background ==
Given the large and accessible natural openings, these caverns were likely utilized for storage and shelter by the Susquehannock people who camped nearby prior to the 1700s. The caverns also bear graffiti marks that were made by early American explorers who visited the system during the beginning of the nineteenth century.

For nineteen years (1802–1821) the caverns were the home of William Wilson, who was also known as the "Pennsylvania Hermit." Wilson withdrew from society after his failure to halt the execution of his sister Elizabeth for the murder of her twin sons. Following her death in Chester, Pennsylvania in 1786, William wandered westward across southeastern Pennsylvania, settling in the caverns in 1802. The Sweets of Solitude: Instructions to Mankind How They May Be Happy in a Miserable World, an essay reportedly written by Wilson during his time in the caverns, was published following his death.

During the early 1900s, the caverns became a popular exploration site for area Boy Scout troops. Sometime around 1919, a box labeled "diamonds in the rough" which contained coins dating to 488 B.C. and 1288, as well as coins from Argentina, Austria, Brazil, Egypt, England, France, Greece, Guatemala, and Italy, was found by Hummelstown resident Russell S. Zeiters while he and four of his boyhood friends were exploring the caves. The box also contained a gold-mounted aluminum cameo inscribed with "My Mother," a dozen moonstones, additional pieces of jewelry, and a bottle of alumninum paint powder. Experts at the State Museum of Pennsylvania subsequently examined the box and its contents and verified the ages of several of the coins it contained.

Previously known as Wilson Cave, Hummelstown Cave, Stoverdale Cave, Giant's Cave, and Indian Cave, this system of caverns was renamed Indian Echo Cave when it was outfitted with electrical lighting, walkways and safety railings, and was located on the old Brehm farm roughly one mile from Hummelstown. It opened to the public as a commercial attraction in 1929, and was operated by the Indian Echo Cave Company.

Known as Indian Echo Caverns by the 1930s, the attraction was purchased in 1942 by Ed Swartz, who had grown up near the caves and visited them as a child. Swartz subsequently went on to build a business reputation as a country and western entertainment producer prior to purchasing the cavern system.

During the early years of Swartz's ownership, Indian Echo Caverns offered both country and western concerts, as well as guided tours of the caverns. Visiting performers included Grand Ole Opry star Roy Acuff and the Hoosier Hot Shots from the Chicago National Barn Dance. Those performances were discontinued in 1947 when attraction waned for the concerts, but rose for tourist visits to the caves.

In 1971, Indian Echo Caverns was awarded the National Caves Association seal of approval and recommended to tourists as an attraction worth visiting.

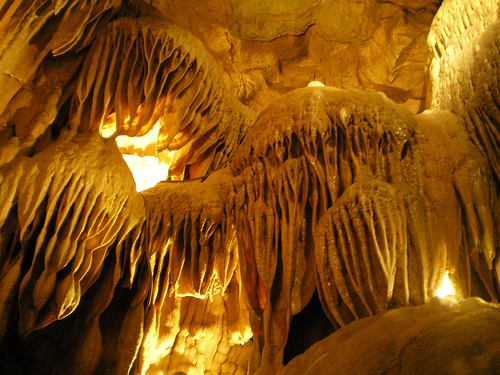
Interior of the show cave

The entrance to the cavern system that is used by modern visitors is located in a bluff along the Swatara Creek. A second entrance that had been previously used by visitors was sealed for security purposes during the late 1920s.

The known portions of the caverns represent the intersection of two passages: the "eastern" cavern and the "northern" cavern, which meet at right angles to form a large space known as the "Indian Ballroom."

The geological system in which the caverns are located has been responsible for the creation of multiple sinkholes in an area stretching from Hummelstown to as far as Palmyra, and as far south as Middletown.

=== Temporary closures during flooding ===
In 1972, 1975, and 2011, Indian Echo Caverns was closed to tourists temporarily when the Swatara Creek overflowed its banks, filled the cave with water and left behind thick layers of mud when the waters finally receded. The flooding in 1972 was a direct result of Hurricane Agnes.

== See also ==
- Geology of Pennsylvania
- List of caves
- List of caves in the United States
