= Keystone Hotel (Hummelstown, Pennsylvania) =

- U.S. National Register of Historic Places
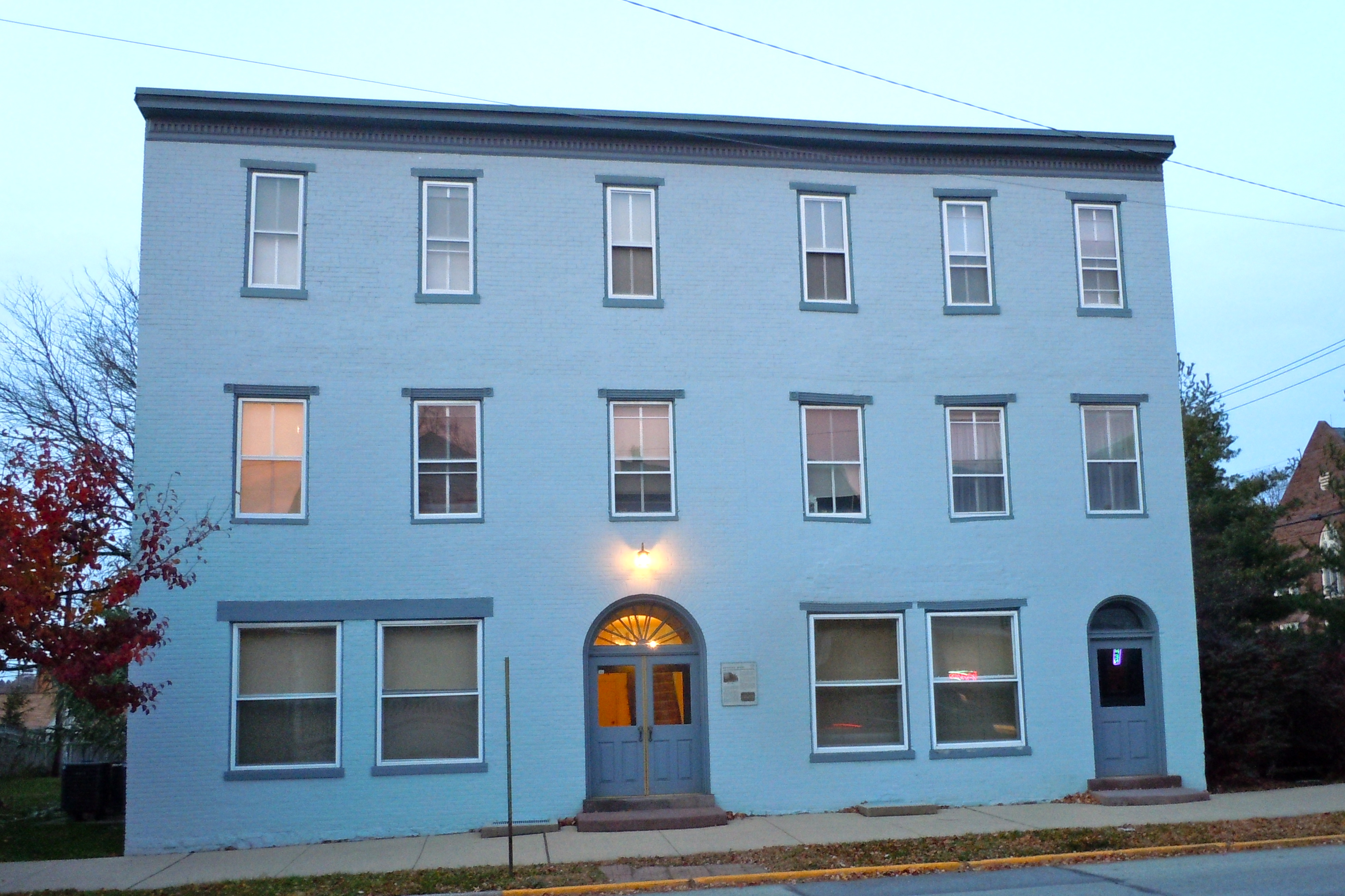
- Keystone Hotel, November 2011

- Location within Pennsylvania Location within the United States
- Location: 40 E. Main St., Hummelstown, Pennsylvania
- Coordinates: 40°15′57″N 76°42′21″W
- Area: 1 acre (0.40 ha)
- Built: 1839, 1850
- Architect: G. Fox
- Architectural style: Federal, Vernacular Federal
- NRHP reference No.: 85001002
- Added to NRHP: May 9, 1985

The Keystone Hotel is an historic home that is located in Hummelstown, Dauphin County, Pennsylvania, United States.

It was added to the National Register of Historic Places in 1985.

== History and architectural features ==
The original building was built in 1839, and was more than doubled in size in 1850. It was originally a two-and-one-half-story, rectangular, brick building with gable roof that was designed in a vernacular, Federal style. The 1850 expansion raised and flattened the original roofline, and added a three-bay, three-story brick addition to the east side. An old brownstone addition pre-dates the 1839 building.
