= Lower Dauphin High School =

Coordinates: 40.2599°N 76.7058°W

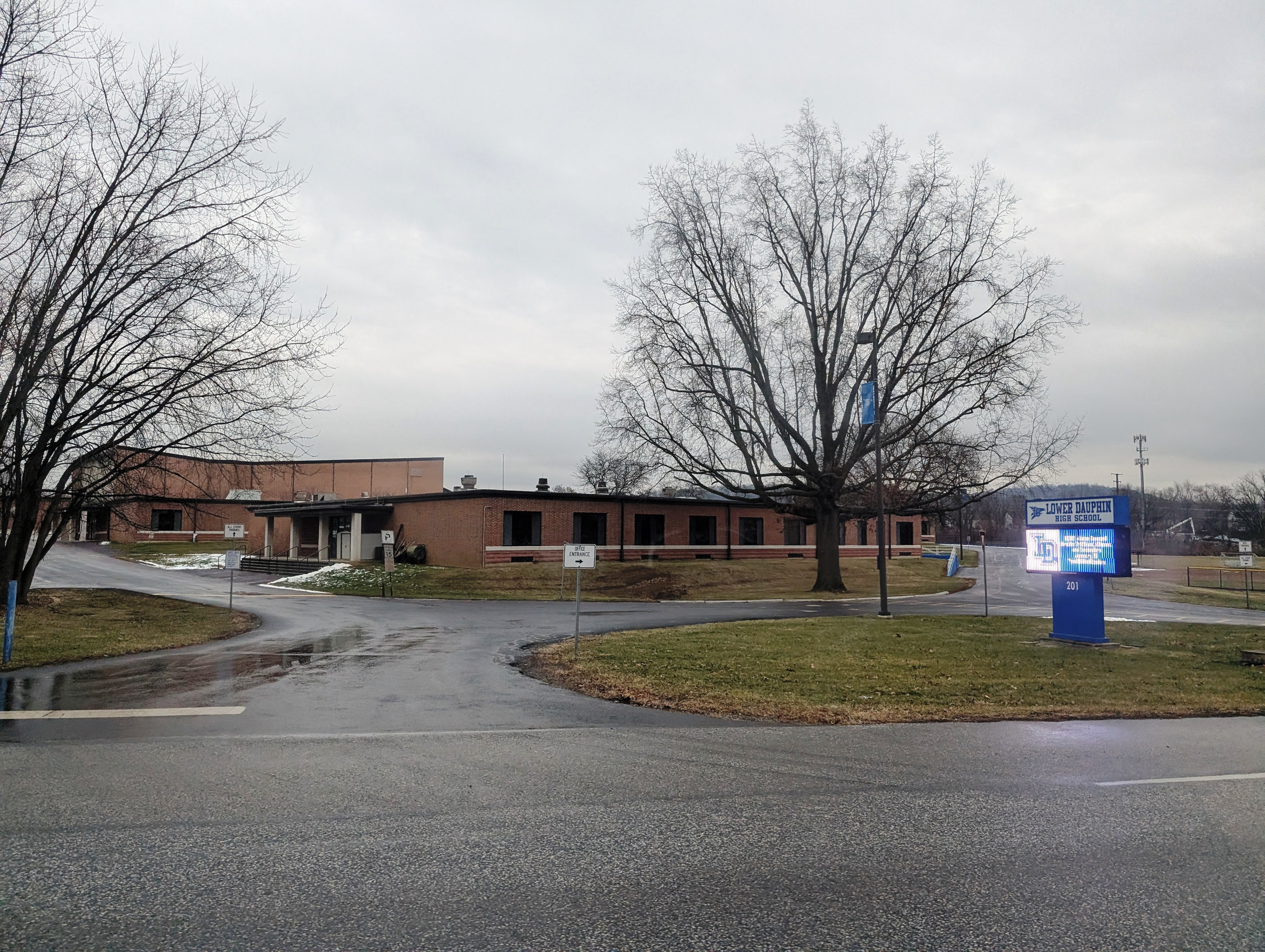

Location
- 201 South Hanover Street; Hummelstown, PA

Information
- Type: Public high school
- Established: 1961
- School district: Lower Dauphin School District
- Principal: Justin Hanula
- Staff: 87.99 (FTE)
- Grades: 9–12
- Enrollment: 1,165 (2017–18)
- Student to teacher ratio: 13.24
- Colors: Royal blue and white
- Athletics: Falcons (boys); Lady Falcons (girls)
- Mascot: Falcon
- Website: http://www.ldsd.org/highschool

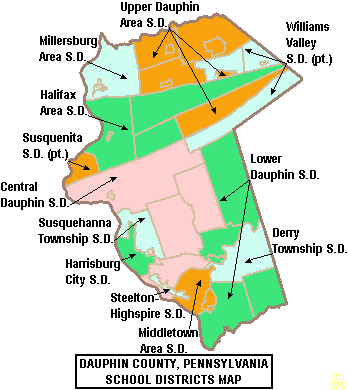
School District regions in Dauphin County showing Lower Dauphin School District's two sections in green

Lower Dauphin High School is a midsized, suburban, public high school located in Hummelstown, Pennsylvania. It is part of the Lower Dauphin School District, serving the Borough of Hummelstown and the Townships of East Hanover, South Hanover, Londonderry, and Conewago. In 2017–2018, enrollment was reported as 1,165 pupils in 9th through 12th grades. The school building was built in 1960.

Students may choose to attend Dauphin County Technical School for training in the construction and mechinal trades. The cost is paid by the school district. The high school is served by the Capital Area Intermediate Unit 15 which offers a variety of services, including a completely developed K–12 curriculum that is mapped and aligned with the Pennsylvania Academic Standards (available online), shared services, a group purchasing program and a wide variety of special education and special needs services.

District students grades 6th through 12th may be alternatively assigned or elect to attend the online program at Price School. The school uses Capital Area Online Learning Association which is run by the Capital Area IU15. The school also offers a work experience program and an outdoor learning program. In 2012–2013, 21 students chose this alternative program.

Many of the school's students come from Lower Dauphin Middle School, which gets students from: Nye Elementary School (Hummelstown), East Hanover Elementary School, South Hanover Elementary School, Londonderry Elementary School, and Conewago Elementary School.

Approximately 80 percent of Lower Dauphin High School graduates undertake tertiary education, either in four-year institutions, two-year colleges, or technical institutions. The local community college, Harrisburg Area Community College receives 20 to 25 percent of the Lower Dauphin graduating class.

== Extracurriculars ==
Lower Dauphin High School offers a wide variety of clubs, activities and a large sports program.

=== Sports ===
Lower Dauphin High School is a member of the Pennsylvania Interscholastic Athletic Association and the Mid-Penn Conference Athletic League. Thirteen of the schools 19 varsity sports also offer a second junior varsity team.

The district funds:

Boys:

- Baseball - varsity and JV teams AAAA
- Basketball - varsity and JV teams AAAA
- Cross country - AAA
- Football - AAAA
- Golf - AAA
- Indoor track and field - AAAA
- Lacrosse - AAAA
- Soccer - varsity and JV teams AAA
- Swimming and diving - Class AAA
- Tennis - varsity and JV teams AAA
- Track and field - AAA
- Volleyball - varsity and JV teams AAA
- Wrestling - varsity and JV teams AAA

Girls:

- Basketball - varsity and JV teams AAAA
- Cheerleading - varsity and JV teams
- Cross country - AAA
- Field hockey - varsity and JV teams AAA
- Golf - AAA
- Indoor track and field - AAAA
- Lacrosse - AAAA
- Soccer - varsity and JV teams AAA
- Softball - varsity and JV teams AAAA
- Tennis - varsity and JV teams AAA
- Track and field - AAA
- Volleyball - varsity and JV teams AAA

According to PIAA directory July 2012.

The 2016 boys' soccer team finished the season ranked third in the nation by USA Today on its final Super 25 Expert Rankings.

== Notable alumni ==
- Nicholas Perry, YouTuber and mukbanger known as Nikocado Avocado.
- Bill Gaudette, former professional footballer
- Joey Julius, former college football kicker for the Penn State Nittany Lions football.
- Steve Spence, professional long-distance runner.
- Bob Swank, college head football coach.
- Billy Kametz, voice actor.
