= William "Amos" Wilson =

American hermit (1762–1821)

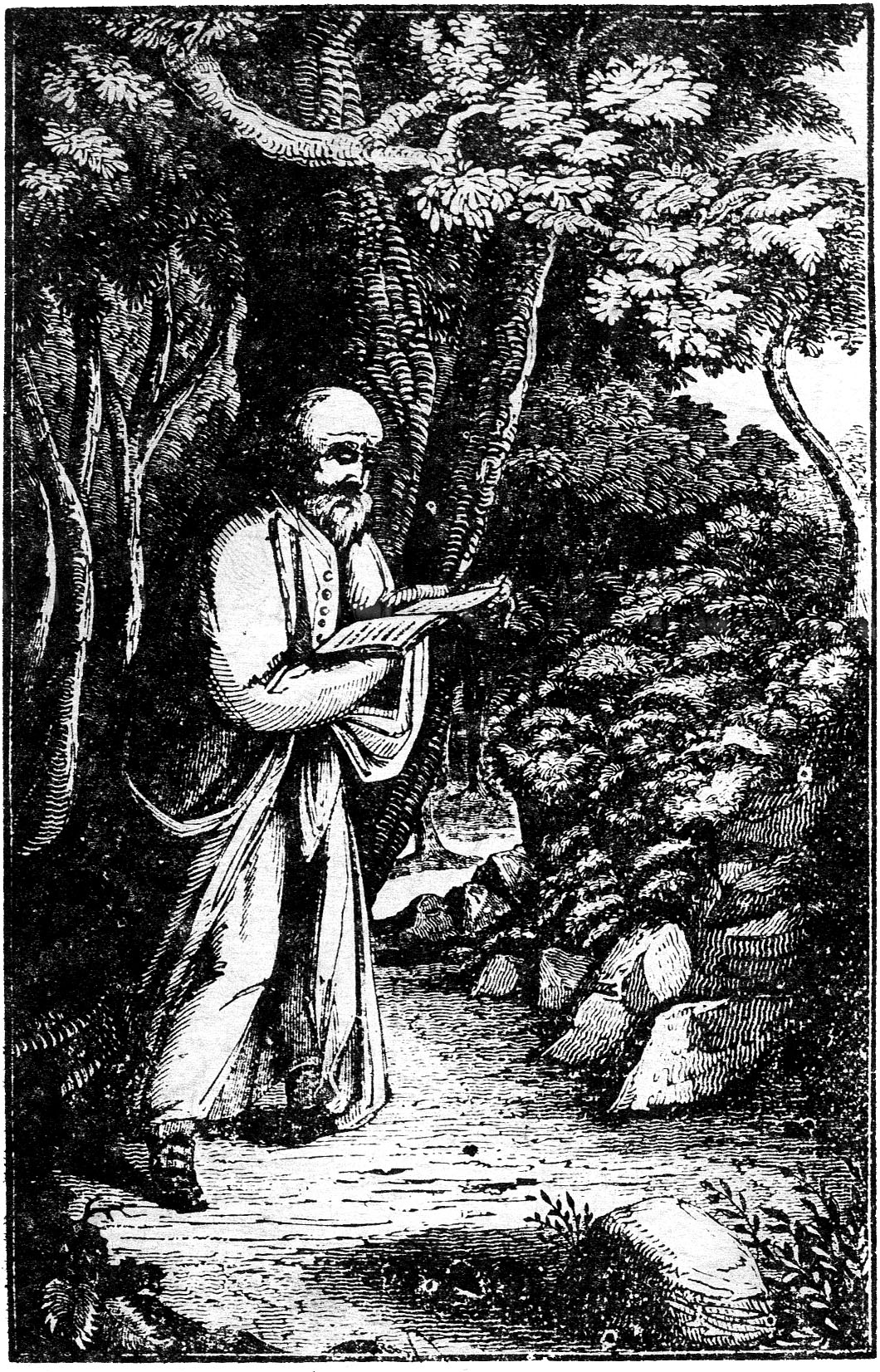
Wilson depicted in the 1839 edition of The Pennsylvania Hermit

William Wilson (ca. 1762 – October 1821) — known as The Pennsylvania Hermit — became a figure in the folklore of southeastern and south-central Pennsylvania in the late 18th and early 19th centuries. His sister Elizabeth had been condemned for the murder of her children, although many believed her to be innocent of those charges. A pardon for Elizabeth was granted by the state and entrusted to William, but he was unable to deliver it in time to stop the execution. Following his sister's death, William withdrew from society, wandering westward across southeastern Pennsylvania and ultimately living his last 19 years in a cave near Hummelstown.

In some sources, William and Elizabeth are referred to as Amos Wilson and Harriot Wilson. However, the historical record leaves no doubt that the Hermit and his sister were named William and Elizabeth. The origin of these "alternate" names has never been fully explained.

Many key elements of the Wilsons' saga are documented in the records of the Chester County Courts and the Commonwealth of Pennsylvania. However, the story quickly became a part of local folklore and was embellished by generations of storytellers. It is often possible to note which elements of the tale are a part of the historical record and which might be considered suspect. However, the story of the Pennsylvania Hermit might best be considered historical fiction, as the familiar tale incorporates elements of both history and fiction, not unlike the popular image of a Johnny Appleseed or Davy Crockett. The following is a synthesis of numerous sources from both genres and is best regarded as historical fiction.

== Early life ==
Little background information has survived regarding the Wilson family. Some early accounts report that William and Elizabeth's father was a farmer named John Wilson. John's first wife, and the children's mother, was also named Elizabeth.

Sources are divided regarding the Wilsons' ages. Some indicate that William was born ca. 1764, and his sister two years later, while others suggest that Elizabeth was born ca. 1758 and that William was her younger brother by an unspecified period of time. There is no record of other siblings, and some accounts specify that William was his parents' only son and Elizabeth their only daughter. William was said to have been born in Lebanon, in present-day Lebanon County, although in every other instance he and his family are linked to Chester County.

(Prior to 1789, Chester County included all of present-day Delaware County, and Chester City was the county seat. Chester City then served as the seat of Delaware County until the seat was moved to Media in 1851.)

The Wilson family lived in Chester County, most likely in East Bradford or West Bradford Township. Theirs was a farm family of modest means but solid reputation. During the American Revolution they sided with the British, and much of their property was confiscated by American forces. When the children were still young the elder Elizabeth died. Their father later remarried, but his second wife did not care for her stepchildren, and she encouraged their father to send them away as soon as they were of age.

== The case of Elizabeth Wilson ==
At sixteen, William was apprenticed to a stone carver named Fahnestock 50 mi (80 km) away in Lancaster County. Elizabeth went to Philadelphia and became either an employee or patron of the Indian Queen Tavern. In early 1784, Elizabeth was seduced by a tavern guest who soon after disappeared, leaving her pregnant. As her pregnancy became increasingly obvious her presence became too great an embarrassment, and she was made to leave the Indian Queen. She returned to her parents' home where she gave birth to twin sons.

=== Murder ===
In October, 1784, Elizabeth disappeared while traveling to meet her erstwhile lover in Newtown Square. She reappeared several days later but the children were nowhere to be seen. Their bodies were soon found hidden in the woods nearby and Elizabeth was quickly arrested. She was charged with "the murder of her Two Bastard Male Children." In October, 1785, she was found guilty of murder in the first degree and was sentenced to hang. The date for the execution was set for 7 December 1785.

=== Confession and pardon ===
Throughout the trial and the preceding events, William Wilson remained at work in Lancaster, unaware of his sister's predicament. But when Elizabeth was condemned to death William mysteriously announced that he was needed in Chester and would have to leave his job. He arrived at the jail on 3 December 1785. After recovering from the shock of seeing her brother so unexpectedly, Elizabeth was finally willing to relate the details surrounding her children's murder.

William hastily assembled a group of respected officials, including Judge Atlee, to witness Elizabeth's confession. Elizabeth explained that her seducer had agreed to meet her in Newtown Square. However, he unexpectedly met her in a wood about 3 km (1.9 mi) west of the town, then killed the children and swore Elizabeth to silence.

The confession was signed by the witnesses. William presented it to the Supreme Executive Council on 6 Dec 1785. The president of the Council was Benjamin Franklin, and its vice president was Charles Biddle (1745–1821). Biddle's journal includes a brief discussion of the Wilson case and, in addition to court and Council records, is one of the more reputable sources regarding the matter. The Council ordered that the execution be postponed until 3 January 1786, in order to allow them more time in which to consider the case.

In the meantime, William went in search of his sister's erstwhile lover, but when he found him on a New Jersey farm he denied ever having known Elizabeth. William then began to seek out witnesses who could link the man with the city of Philadelphia and with his sister. He was successful in compiling a list of several people, but he became ill around Christmas and spent some time recuperating at a friend's home in Philadelphia.

Upon his next visit to the Chester jail, he was horrified to learn that Elizabeth's execution was scheduled for the following day. During his illness he had lost track of time and believed that it was 1 January, rather than 2 January.

William rode to Franklin's home to request another postponement of Elizabeth's sentence but had to wait several hours to see him. Franklin felt that it was improper for him to act and referred William to Vice President Biddle. William found Biddle at the State House. Biddle wrote the order, "Do not execute Wilson until you hear further from Council," knowing that the members of the Executive Council were sympathetic towards Elizabeth and intended to grant a full respite.

With Biddle's pardon in hand, William began the 24 km (15 mi) ride to Chester. He rode down Market Street and approached the Middle Ferry across the Schuylkill River. Heavy rain had made the river dangerously high and choked it with ice and debris; the ferry was not in operation. The last of the Revolutionary War-era pontoon bridges spanning the Schuylkill had been destroyed by an earlier flood in 1784 and the ferry was the only means of crossing the river in that area. William pleaded with the ferryman for several hours but could not persuade him. Finally, in desperation, he drove his horse into the icy water. The animal struggled against the current but was struck in the head by a chunk of ice or driftwood just fifty feet from the opposite shore. William swam the rest of the way, and by the time he reached dry land he was approximately 3.5 km (2.2 mi) downstream from where he'd entered the water, beyond the area of Gray's Ferry. William found another horse and continued the ride to Chester, along what is today the Chester Pike (US Route 13).

=== Execution ===
Meanwhile, officials in Chester began preparations for Elizabeth's execution. The sheriff of Chester (given as either Ezekiel Leonard or William Gibbons) was one of the many who had come to believe that Elizabeth was innocent and who, following her confession, suspected that she might be pardoned. He stationed flagmen at intervals along the Queens Highway (4th Street), leading from Philadelphia, who could signal if William were coming with a pardon. Those assembled watched expectantly for a signal but none was seen. Noon arrived, and by law the sheriff could wait no longer. The order was given and the cart was pulled from beneath Elizabeth Wilson's feet. She did not die outright but showed little sign of struggle. Several long moments passed before the crowd noticed white flags waving along the road from Philadelphia.

William rode to Hangman's Lot calling, "A pardon! A pardon!" His horse reared at the sight of Elizabeth's body, throwing him to the muddy ground beneath his sister. The sheriff quickly cut the rope and tried frantically to revive Elizabeth, but it was too late to save her. Varying accounts state that William arrived anywhere from mere moments to twenty-three minutes too late to deliver Biddle's pardon and save his sister's life.

According to legend, when William rose from the mud beneath the gallows tree his hair had turned prematurely white and his face was marked by the lines of old age. His speech was reduced to gibberish.

== The Pennsylvania Hermit ==
After several months in a state of delirium, William returned to work as a stone carver. However, he had lost all interest in society and eventually abandoned it. He began to roam westward across southeastern Pennsylvania, interacting with others only when he needed to negotiate for provisions. He was known as the Hermit of Welsh Mountain, suggesting that he spent some time on or around that ridge on the line between Chester and the easternmost point of Lancaster County, just east of New Holland. He was said to have disappeared into the "Conewaga Mountains," perhaps referring to Conewago Hill on the west side of Mount Gretna. And he was known to have made grindstones and traded them for supplies in "Campbellstown" (most likely Campbelltown). All of this is consistent with a westward journey from Chester County to Hummelstown, perhaps along a route approximated by US Route 322.

In 1802, William came to the place that would be his home for the last nineteen years of his life. The cave (today known as Indian Echo Caverns) where William set up residence is located at the foot of a high bluff, or "palisades," at the head of a horseshoe bend on the Swatara Creek, approximately 6.2 miles (10.0 km) upstream from where it meets the Susquehanna River at Middletown. It is on the western boundary of Derry Township, less than .62 miles (1.00 km) southwest of Hummelstown and approximately 8.7 miles (14.0 km) east of the site of the present-day State Capitol in Harrisburg. It is approximately 3.7 miles (6.0 km) from the modern town of Hershey.

There are many caves in that area, but the Hermit's cave is particularly large and accessible. The natural entrance is approximately 26 feet wide and was well known to local residents from the earliest times. The "room" that became William's primary living quarters was over 98 feet (30 m) inside the cave and around a "corner." Although natural daylight often reaches that area, particularly late in the day, it is not directly visible from outside. The cave provided shelter and maintained a constant 52 °F (11 °C) temperature. It was, however, subject to flooding. There is a natural ledge, reputed to have been William's bed, beside which stands a stalagmite that bears marks attributed to the rope ladder used to reach the ledge. There is a large recess near floor level which, according to legend, was used by Wilson and others as a 'natural fireplace'. However, it vents back into the room rather than to the outside and any large fire would have quickly filled the room with smoke, making it unlikely that it would have seen much repeat usage. William's possessions were few: a straw mattress, a table and stool, some cooking implements, a Bible and other religious books. He wrote frequently, generally on religious topics, and numerous manuscript pages were scattered among his possessions. He kept his clothes and his body clean but would not shave, and in later years was noted for a long, flowing, white beard.

Despite his desire to separate himself from society, William's hermitage was not particularly isolated. It sat half a mile from a long-established town and was well known to the locals long before his arrival. While there is no evidence that local residents were ever abusive to William, it became a challenge to visit the cave and to catch a glimpse of its famous occupant. However, William was so familiar with the cave's topography that he was generally able to avoid curiosity seekers by retreating to hidden areas known only to him. His only personal acquaintance was a farmer who lived across the Swatara Creek in present-day Lower Swatara Township. (The land on the western side of the Creek slopes gently to the water, and before stairs were built for tourists in the 1920s it would have been easier to approach the cave from across the creek than to scale the cliff.) William made grindstones, which he traded with the farmer in exchange for supplies.

=== Wilson's death ===
On 13 October 1821, the Harrisburg Intelligencer ran the following notice:

Died lately at his lonely hovel among the hills, twelve miles southeast from Harrisburg, Pa., -------- Wilson, who for many years endeavored to be a solitary recluse from the society of men... His retirement was principally occasioned by the melancholy manner of the death of his sister, by which his reason was partially affected... (He) was observed frequently to be estranged, and one morning was found dead by a few of his neighbors, who had left him the evening previously in good health.

As was the case with his sister, the details and location of William's burial remain unknown, although it is often assumed that he was buried somewhere on his friend's farm in Lower Swatara Township.

== The Pennsylvania Hermit in popular culture ==
=== The Sweets of Solitude ===
The tragic, lurid tale of William and Elizabeth Wilson quickly became familiar throughout the Philadelphia area and was told and retold in local papers throughout the 19th and 20th centuries. Only two days after Elizabeth's execution, a printer in Philadelphia published the first version of The Faithful Narrative of Elizabeth Wilson. By the end of the year, at least three (and as many as six) other editions were published. Additional versions were published as late as 1807. Although Elizabeth was certainly the focus of most early accounts, some of which make only passing references to her brother, William was also the subject of several sensationalist publications.

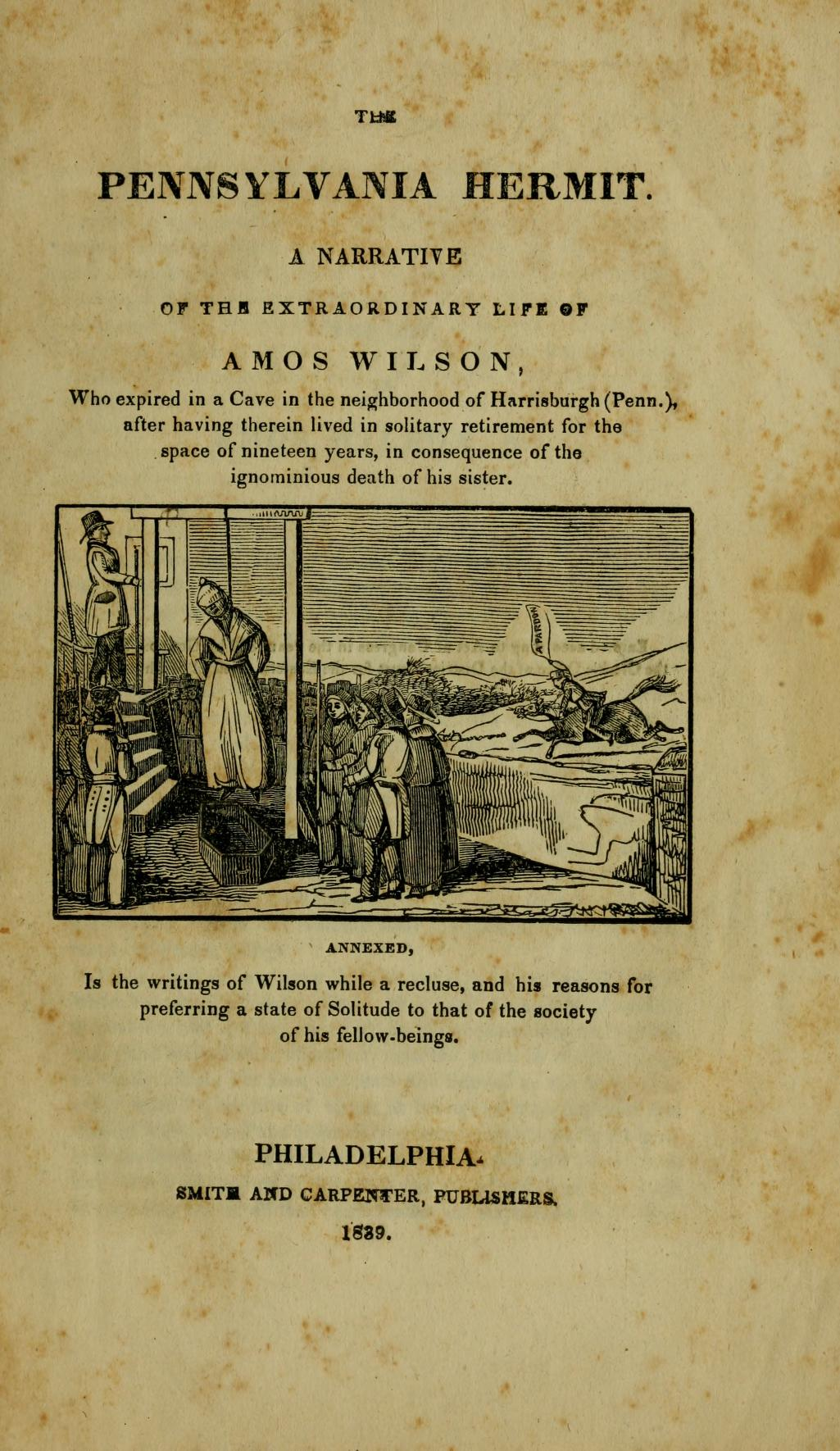
Illustrated title page of the 1839 edition of The Pennsylvania Hermit

In hermit lore, The Pennsylvania Hermit is believed to have been published very shortly after William died in 1821; however, the earliest known printing was in 1839, eighteen years later. As with The Faithful Narrative, several editions were published in various northeastern cities. William had refused to allow anyone to read his manuscripts, let alone publish them, as he did not want society to benefit from his work. However, he supposedly requested that one item be published after his death. At some time after William's death, The Pennsylvania Hermit: A Narrative of the Extraordinary Life of Amos Wilson was published. It is a twenty-four page pamphlet in two parts. The first, titled The Life of Amos Wilson, &c., is a brief telling of the Wilsons' story. The writer describes himself as William's friend and claims to have visited him the night before he died; he is generally assumed to have been the farmer who lived across the Creek. The second part of the pamphlet is The Sweets of Solitude, or Instructions to Mankind How They May Be Happy in a Miserable World, and is purported to have been written by Wilson himself.

Having been published by an alleged friend the book is often assumed to be an authoritative account of Wilson's life. In actuality, the book contains numerous errors in chronology and geography and is often dramatically at odds with the historical record and with most other accounts of the Wilsons' story. For instance, it reports that William was born in 1774 and his sister in 1776, meaning that Elizabeth would have been approximately nine years old when she was hanged, and William eleven. It tells that she gave birth to a single child whom she killed immediately after birth; in this version, her jailhouse confession was simply an acknowledgment of her guilt and sinful nature. It also reports that William was born in the city of Lebanon, in Dauphin County. Lebanon City was indeed a part of Dauphin County from 1785 through 1813; however, when William was born it was still a part of Lancaster County, and by the time of his death and Hermit's publication that territory had long been a part of Lebanon County. While this might seem to be a trivial matter, it must be remembered that the book's author claimed to have been a local resident and might be expected to have been better informed regarding the basics of local geography. Hermit includes some of the earliest instances of the 'aliases' Amos and Harriot, and might be the source of those names. The book often appears more concerned with providing moral instruction than with presenting a factual account; The Life of Amos Wilson contains the passage, "You see by the foregoing pages the gradation of evils dependent on a departure from...dignified modesty," and admonishes readers to "(t)urn your attention to those houses of debauchery where Vice reigns triumphant, and on whom poor mourning Virtue sheds a tear of pity." As such, its author may have changed the names of his lead characters in light of their questionable relationship with the historical figures of William and Elizabeth.

=== The Narrative of Indian Echo Cave ===
In 1929, a pamphlet, much like the original published in 1839, appears to have surfaced. The cover of the pamphlet is gray and contains inside three distinct parts. The first part is the story of Elizabeth (Harriet) Wilson and her ignominious death. Part the second is the manifesto of William Amos Wilson titled The Sweets of Solitude. The third part is a new addition to the original publication and is titled 'A Legend on the Swatara.'

The Swatara is of course the creek that runs in front of the cave and emanates north of the cavern, or dell. The indication in the text is that the third part was transcribed from an oration given by a LeRoy O. Holler in 1903 in Hummelstown, PA.

=== The Narrative of Indian Echo Cave ===
In 1945, the final publication seems to have emerged. This is a similar publication to the 1929 edition, which features a gray cover, but this edition features a red cover. It is titled the same, but features a fourth appendix that only takes up one page. It seems that in 1945 or so, an amphitheater was to be built, with a capacity of 10,000, that would bring people far and wide to "hear the great acoustics of Echo Dell."

=== Other accounts ===
In the mid-19th century, a Chester newspaper printed an account of William's tale that made no mention of his time in the cave and stated that he died in 1819. Another made repeated reference to a small blue stool on which William, as a boy, had carved the initials "E & W." Predating Charles Foster Kane's Rosebud by a century, the stool served as a reminder of a more innocent time as Elizabeth awaited execution. Another version claims that after William arrived at Benjamin Franklin's home, Franklin immediately convened a special late-night session of the Executive Council and all necessary work related to the pardon was completed within minutes; this is dramatically at odds with the details provided by the vice president of that Council.

Several sources also include dramatic, extended quotes attributed to both William and Elizabeth. Again, these passages sometimes seem to have more to do with reinforcing a rigid, traditional morality than with relating the factual story of William and Elizabeth Wilson, and as many exist only in a single source their authenticity must be viewed skeptically.

=== Wilson's Cave ===
The cave where William Wilson spent the last 19 years of his life has been known as Wilson Cave, Hummelstown Cave, Stoverdale Cave, Giant's Cave, and Indian Cave. When it was commercialized in the late 1920s it was renamed Indian Echo Cave. It has more recently been known as Indian Echo Caverns and remains open to the public. Today, William Wilson is perhaps better known in Dauphin County than in Chester, as his story is still heard frequently at Indian Echo Caverns, where it provides a dramatic conclusion to the guided tours presented daily. For many years the Caverns exhibited a table and chair that had supposedly belonged to Wilson; these were removed some time ago and were almost certainly not authentic.

=== Ghost stories ===
The Wilsons' story inevitably inspired several ghost stories.

For many years local residents claimed to see and hear a spectral horseman galloping across Chester and Delaware Counties and up to the old jail. This story became well known after William became a recluse—but long before he actually died.

When trees were cleared to make a parking lot for Indian Echo Cave, it was said that the newly opened space revealed Elizabeth Wilson's wandering spirit. This ghost story is unusual in that, while living, Elizabeth never set foot anywhere near the area she was alleged to haunt.

More poignant are tales from East Bradford Township of a female spirit walking through the woods where (according to some accounts) the bodies of Elizabeth's children were discovered, looking for something lost beneath the leaves.

While early storytelling focused on Elizabeth's saga and the moral implications of her actions, the current focus seems to be on the sensational aspects of William's ride and Elizabeth's execution and on the strange circumstances of William's life in the cave. As such, the story is sometimes resurrected by local media in connection with Halloween observances or as part of "strange but true" features.

== See also ==
- Red Barn Murder
- The Newgate Calendar
