= Hummelstown, Pennsylvania =

Borough in Pennsylvania, US

Hummelstown, Pennsylvania Fredrickstown
- Borough
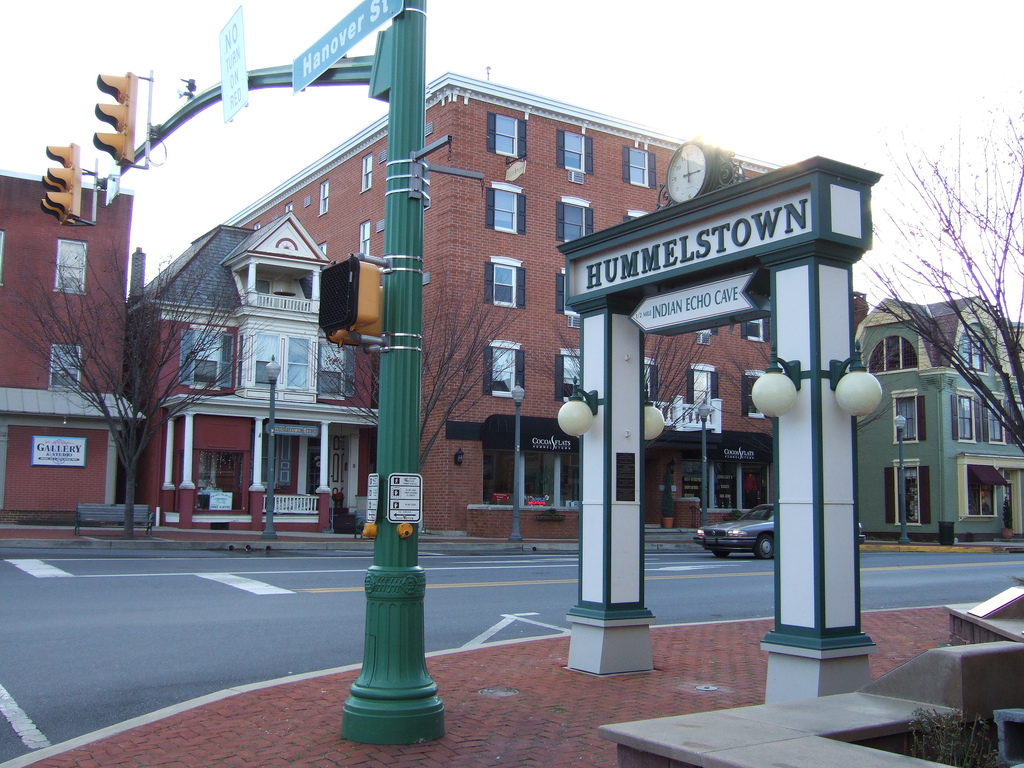
- Hummelstown square
- Motto: Your Kind of Town
- Location in Dauphin County and the U.S. state of Pennsylvania.

- Location in Pennsylvania and the United States Hummelstown (the United States)
- Coordinates: 40°15′55″N 76°42′31″W
- Country: United States
- State: Pennsylvania
- County: Dauphin
- Settled: 1762
- Incorporated (borough): 1874

Government There are 12 seats on the borough council
  - Type: Borough Council
  - Mayor: David Roeting

Area
  - Total: 1.31 sq mi (3.39 km^{2})
  - Land: 1.24 sq mi (3.22 km^{2})
  - Water: 0.069 sq mi (0.18 km^{2})
- Elevation: 397 ft (121 m)

Population (2020)
  - Total: 4,544
  - Density: 3,658.3/sq mi (1,412.46/km^{2})
- Time zone: UTC-5 (Eastern (EST))
  - Summer (DST): UTC-4 (EDT)
- ZIP code: 17036
- Area code: 717
- FIPS code: 42-36232
- GNIS feature ID: 1213972
- Website: hummelstown.gov

Hummelstown is a borough in Dauphin County, Pennsylvania, United States. The population was 4,535 as of the 2020 census. It is part of the Harrisburg metropolitan area.

Originally named Fredrickstown, the town was established in 1762. Hummelstown is a Tree City and is located in District 15 of the Pennsylvania State Senate. It is centrally located between Harrisburg and Hershey. It has several businesses and shops designed to capitalize on the tourist traffic that passes through town.

== History ==
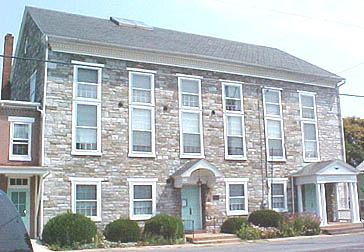
The original Parish House, now the Hummelstown Historical Society Library & Museum

Hummelstown was founded as "Fredrickstown" in 1762 by two Germans, Frederick and Rosina Hummel. They purchased the land for 200 pounds sterling, then divided the area into building lots, which were sold to German settlers. During the mid-19th century, the Union Canal along Swatara Creek was an important factor in the development of the local economy, promoting trade and transportation.

The town was located on the Berks-Dauphin Turnpike, and later it was served by the Union Canal which paralleled Swatara Creek bordering the north and the west sides of the town, and was opened in 1827. The Lebanon Valley Railroad arrived in 1858. This brought about many jobs of stone cutting and shipyard work and helped facilitate the Hummelstown Brownstone Company which became the leading employer of Hummelstown residents. The company mined Hummelstown brownstone at its quarries from 1867 until 1929. The company was the largest producer of brownstone on the East Coast.

Throughout the history of the town it has been a stopping point for travelers to Harrisburg, the capital of Pennsylvania, or to Hershey, the home of Hershey Foods, Hersheypark, and Chocolate World. At various times Hummelstown has been as close as 20 miles (32 km) from up to ten different professional sports teams, such as the Harrisburg Heat, Hershey Bears, Hershey Wildcats, and the Harrisburg City Islanders. The Calder Cup has had several ceremonies conducted in Hummelstown over the years.

The borough celebrated its semiquincentennial or 250-year anniversary in 2012.

The Dr. William Henderson House, Keystone Hotel, Enoch Matlack House, and Zion Lutheran Church and Graveyard are listed on the National Register of Historic Places. The Hummelstown Historical Society building is located at North Rosanna Street and North Alley Street in the original building for the Zion Lutheran Church, which is now the main brownstone church on Main Street of Hummelstown. The society has a library, museum, and genealogy section, and hosts numerous Native American relics, such as arrowheads, bones, and pottery.

Hummelstown is within a thirty-minute drive of several colleges and educational institutions, such as HACC, Lebanon Valley College, Penn State Harrisburg, Central Penn College, YTI Career Institute, Kepler Career Institute, and VoTech. Many residents of Hummelstown have jobs in Derry Township, mainly through Hershey Foods and its subsidiaries.

Hummelstown currently has three historical markers in the town, one for the town's oldest church, one for a former Revolutionary War gun factory, and the other for the Hummelstown Brownstone company.

== Geography ==
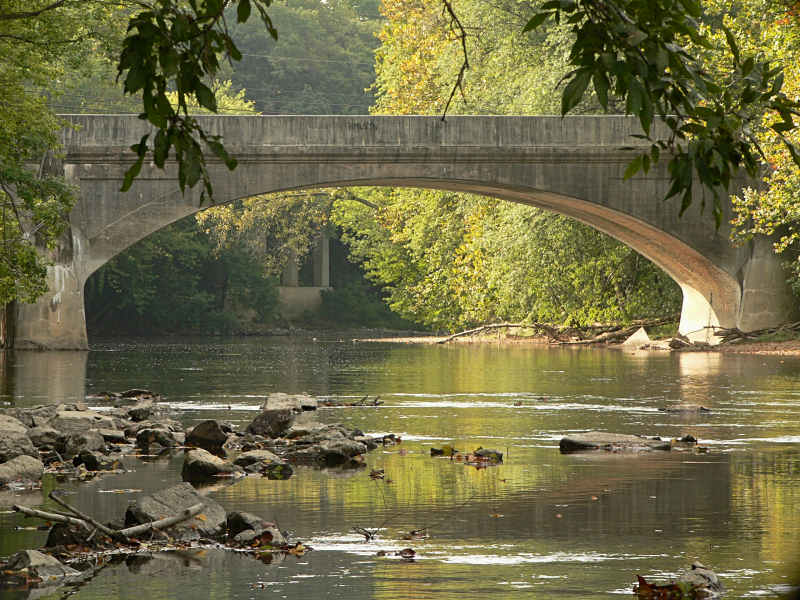
Swatara Creek as seen from a park in Hummelstown, at the west end of town. The bridge supports U.S. 322.

Hummelstown is located in southern Dauphin County at 40°15′55″N 076°42′30″W (40.265168, −76.710995) at an elevation of 397 feet (121 m) above sea level. According to the United States Census Bureau, the borough has a total area of 1.3 square miles (3.4 km^{2}), of which 1.2 square miles (3.2 km^{2}) is land and 0.1 square miles (0.2 km^{2}), or 6.31%, is water. Swatara Creek, a southward-flowing tributary of the Susquehanna River, forms the northern and western border of Hummelstown, and there is one unnamed pond by the Hummel Nature Trail east of the 7–11, at the end of town, next to the Tee Ball baseball field.

=== Climate ===
The climate of Hummelstown is similar to Harrisburg's. The lows during winter reach about −5 °F (−21 °C), and the highs during summer reach about 95 °F (35 °C).

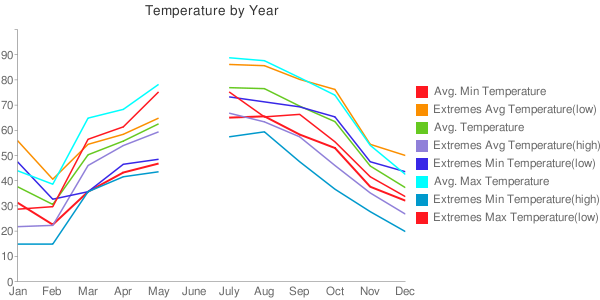
Hummelstown's climate during the year

==== Weather ====
Few tornadoes or hurricanes have struck Hummelstown over the years. In 1992, the borough was hit by a bow tornado. In past years the town has been hit by only several hurricanes, the most severe being Hurricane Agnes which knocked out two key bridges in the town.

Hummelstown has had numerous blizzards. In 1996, a blizzard hit with 13 inches (330 mm); in 1997, a blizzard hit Hummelstown with 9 inches (230 mm) of snow. In 2004, a blizzard with 7 inches (180 mm) hit Hummelstown, and a blizzard hit Hummelstown in 2010 with a record-setting 21 inches (530 mm).

=== Highways ===
U.S. Route 322 skirts the south side of the borough as the Hummelstown Bypass. U.S. Route 422 branches off US 322 just east of the borough limits. The center of Hershey is 3.5 miles (5.6 km) east of the center of Hummelstown, and Harrisburg is 11 miles (18 km) to the west.

East of the center of Hummelstown, Main Street ends at the Boro Bar and Walton Avenue (previously Main Street) turns into and becomes PA Route 39/Hersheypark Road. At the west end of Hummelstown, Fiddlers Elbow Road crosses the US 322 bypass without access to it, then leads south 3 miles (5 km) to the PA 283 expressway. Main Street, leaving Hummelstown to the west, joins U.S. Route 322. Going east Main Street turns into PA Route 39 at what part is known as Hersheypark Drive in Derry Township.

== Demographics ==
Historical population
Census	Pop.	Note	%±
1840	480		—
1850	619		29.0%
1860	807		30.4%
1870	837		3.7%
1880	1,043		24.6%
1890	1,485		42.4%
1900	1,729		16.4%
1910	2,128		23.1%
1920	2,654		24.7%
1930	3,036		14.4%
1940	3,264		7.5%
1950	3,789		16.1%
1960	4,474		18.1%
1970	4,723		5.6%
1980	4,267		−9.7%
1990	3,981		−6.7%
2000	4,360		9.5%
2010	4,538		4.1%
2020	4,544		0.1%
2021 (est.)	4,523	▼	−0.5%

=== 2020 census ===
As of the 2020 census, Hummelstown had a population of 4,544. The median age was 40.4 years. 20.6% of residents were under the age of 18 and 16.6% of residents were 65 years of age or older. For every 100 females there were 91.6 males, and for every 100 females age 18 and over there were 89.3 males age 18 and over.

100.0% of residents lived in urban areas, while 0.0% lived in rural areas.

There were 2,074 households in Hummelstown, of which 26.0% had children under the age of 18 living in them. Of all households, 40.0% were married-couple households, 19.7% were households with a male householder and no spouse or partner present, and 32.4% were households with a female householder and no spouse or partner present. About 36.2% of all households were made up of individuals and 13.4% had someone living alone who was 65 years of age or older.

There were 2,196 housing units, of which 5.6% were vacant. The homeowner vacancy rate was 0.4% and the rental vacancy rate was 8.2%.

Racial composition as of the 2020 census
Race	Number	Percent
White	4,006	88.2%
Black or African American	90	2.0%
American Indian and Alaska Native	4	0.1%
Asian	104	2.3%
Native Hawaiian and Other Pacific Islander	0	0.0%
Some other race	88	1.9%
Two or more races	252	5.5%
Hispanic or Latino (of any race)	268	5.9%

=== 2000 census ===
According to the United States Census Bureau the median house value in Hummelstown is $99,400.

Units in structure	Number	Percent
1-Unit Detached	1,031	52.8%
1-Unit Attached	195	10%
2-Units	116	5.9%
3 or 4 Units	216	11.1%
5 to 9 Units	220	11.3%
10 to 19 Units	65	3.3%
20 or more Units	74	3.8%
Mobile Home	36	1.8%
Boat, RV, or Van (etc.)	0	0.00%

Hummelstown is home to many older homes; a large number were built in the earlier decades of the 1900s.

Year structure built	Number	Percent
1999 to March 2000	21	1.1%
1995 to 1998	85	4.4%
1990 to 1994	33	1.7%
1980 to 1989	143	7.3%
1970 to 1979	239	12.2%
1960 to 1969	250	12.8%
1940 to 1959	531	27.2%
1939 or earlier	651	33.3%

According to the United States Census Bureau, the estimated upkeep cost and home improvement costs to percentage of house value in Hummelstown, has a median of less than 15% (which comes to a median cost of $14,910).

As of the census of 2000, there were 4,360 people, 1,879 households, and 1,200 families residing in the borough. The population density was 3,233.6 inhabitants per square mile (1,248.5/km^{2}). There were 1,953 housing units at an average density of 1,448.4 per square mile (559.2/km^{2}). This housing count reflects units directly within the borough limits, excluding those in the Graystone development and other areas with Hummelstown addresses. The racial makeup of the borough was 97.02% White, 0.32% African American, 0.02% Native American, 1.06% Asian, 0.07% Pacific Islander, 0.67% from other races, and 0.85% from two or more races. Hispanic or Latino of any race were 1.51% of the population.

There were 1,879 households, out of which 29.3% had children under the age of 18 living with them, 49.1% were married couples living together, 10.5% had a female householder with no husband present, and 36.1% were non-families. 31.5% of all households were made up of individuals, and 12.3% had someone living alone who was 65 years of age or older. The average household size was 2.32 and the average family size was 2.91.

In the borough, the population exhibited a varied distribution, with 23.6% under the age of 18, 7.4% aged 18 to 24, 32.0% aged 25 to 44, 21.1% aged 45 to 64, and 15.9% who were 65 years or older. The median age stood at 38 years. There were 95.0 males for every 100 females, and among those aged 18 and over, there were 93.4 males per 100 females.

The median income for a household in the borough was $41,625, and the median income for a family was $50,572. Males had a median income of $36,500 versus $27,547 for females. The per capita income for the borough was $21,394. About 4.2% of families and 6.7% of the population were below the poverty line, including 6.3% of those under age 18 and 7.2% of those age 65 or over.

== Arts and culture ==
=== Annual cultural events ===
- The Lollipop Drop – New Year's Eve (discontinued)
- Movie Nights – at the Herbert A. Schaffner Memorial Park
- Taste of Hummelstown – food sampling by restaurants along the Main Street
- The Hummelstown Arts Festival – a non-profit annual arts festival held each September to raise money for scholarships for graduating seniors at Lower Dauphin High School continuing their education in the arts.
- Hummelstown Winter Fling - January event featuring music, food, and drinks on the square. Established in 2014.
- Trick or Treat – Halloween is the night used for the annual Trick or Treat. Houses with their porchlight on from 6 pm until 8 pm are houses participating.

Borough of Hummelstown: Calendar of Events

=== Museums and other points of interest ===
Hummelstown has a historical society constructed with Hummelstown brownstone. The Hummelstown Historical Society is both a museum and visitor center. The town is home to a historical landmark, the Warwick Hotel, which is still a tavern reminiscent of its pre-Revolutionary War days. George Washington stayed a night there and drank from its bar.

Indian Echo Caverns, located one-half mile south of the borough limits, is one of the main attractions near Hummelstown. The caverns were originally used by the Susquehannock tribe, who lived and hunted in the nearby area until they vanished in the 1670s; it opened to the public in 1929.

The shortline Middletown and Hummelstown Railroad operates heritage and freight service between its namesake towns of Middletown and just south of Hummelstown proper, stopping in front of the Indian Echo Caverns entrance. The Hummelstown Borough Council has expressed concern around quality of life issues (noise, odor, safety) with having more trains passing through town. As such, trains stop just south of the busy four-lane U.S. Route 322 grade crossing on a regular basis, and are allowed to enter town exactly 12 times per year. Norfolk Southern's busy Harrisburg Line traverses the northern section of Hummelstown, with up to 20 lengthy freight trains passing through daily.

=== In the town ===
In the town there is an American Legion, a borough office building, and a post office. The legion and the post office are located on Walton Avenue (Main Street). The borough office building is located on South Hanover Street. The town also has several churches, most located on Main Street.

The Hummelstown Chemical Fire Department occasionally serves as a distribution center for Potassium Iodide pills supplied by the Pennsylvania Department of Health. Hummelstown falls within a 10-mile radius of Three Mile Island.

=== Religion ===
As much of Pennsylvania, in the initial days of its founding, Hummelstown had a large base of Quakers. As the town grew, other Protestant denominations such as Lutheran, Methodist, and Presbyterian developed.

== Parks and recreation ==
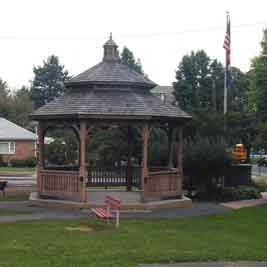
The Pavilion at Herbert A. Schaffner Park

Several parks are located throughout the borough:

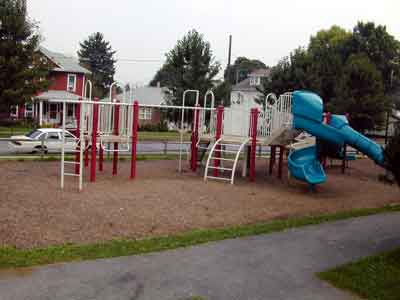
The playground at Schaffner Park, the former Borough Park.

- Barry E. Mehaffie Memorial Park (formerly West End Park)
- Herbert A. Schaffner Memorial Park (formerly Borough Park)
- Hummel Nature Trail
- Marion F. Alexander Memorial Park
- Shope's Field

== Education ==
Lower Dauphin High School, as taken from the Hershey Medical Center life lion

Hummelstown is located in Lower Dauphin School District. Lower Dauphin High School, Lower Dauphin Middle School, Nye Elementary School, and the Price Building are located within the borough, as is the school district's administration building.

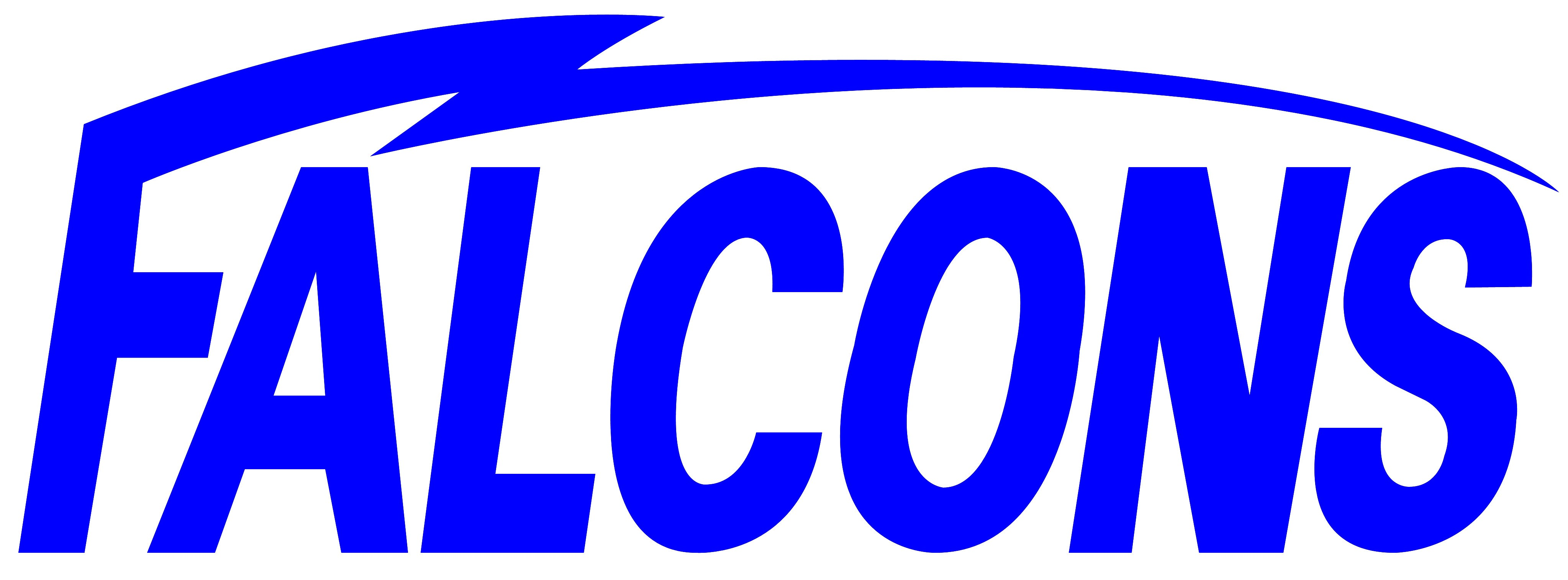
The Lower Dauphin High School Falcons logo

=== Libraries ===
Hummelstown's public library, the William H. and Marion C. Alexander Family Library, named for its major donors and local philanthropists, is located on the corner of 2nd and Railroad Streets.

HUM at a glance:

2,821 square feet of net space
27,456 volumes
Opened in 1953.
Building constructed in 1957 as Hummelstown Teen Center, later Hummelstown Civic Center.
Library moved into building in 1965.
Became part of the Dauphin County Library System in 1975. Library took over entire building in 1983. (This address is the current location of the library but the building info pertains to the former location across from the NYE Elementary School.)

== Media ==
Hummelstown is home to The Sun newspaper, which covers Hummelstown, Hershey and Palmyra area (Lower Dauphin, Derry Township, Milton Hershey and Palmyra Area school districts). In early 2008, The Sun acquired the subscribers of the now-defunct Hershey Chronicle newspaper making The Sun the largest paid-circulation weekly in Dauphin County. The Sun began in 1871.

Other newspapers that cover Hummelstown include:

- The Patriot-News
- Central Penn Business Journal

=== Radio stations ===
This is a list of FM stations in the greater Hummelstown, Pennsylvania, metropolitan area.

Callsign	MHz	Band	"Name", Format, Owner	City of license
WDCV	88.3	FM	Indie/College Rock, Dickinson College	Carlisle
WXPH	88.7	FM	WXPN relay, University of Pennsylvania	Harrisburg
WSYC	88.7	FM	Alternative, Shippensburg University	Shippensburg
WITF-FM	89.5	FM	NPR	Harrisburg
WVMM	90.7	FM	Indie/College Rock, Messiah College	Grantham
WJAZ	91.7	FM	WRTI relay, Classical/Jazz, Temple University	Harrisburg
WKHL	92.1	FM	"K-Love", Contemporary Christian	Palmyra
WPPY	92.7	FM	"Nu 92.7" Adult Contemporary	Starview
WTPA-FM	93.5	FM	"93.5 WTPA" Classic Rock	Mechanicsburg
WRBT	94.9	FM	"Bob" Country	Harrisburg
WLAN	96.9	FM	"FM 97" Top 40	Lancaster
WRVV	97.3	FM	"The River" Classic Hits and the Best of Today's Rock	Harrisburg
WYCR	98.5	FM	98.5 The Peak	York
WQLV	98.9	FM	"Love 99" Adult Contemporary	Millersburg
WHKF	99.3	FM	"Kiss-FM" CHR	Harrisburg
WFVY	100.1	FM	Adult Contemporary	Lebanon
WROZ	101.3	FM	"The Rose" Adult Contemporary	Lancaster
WARM	103.3	FM	"Warm 103" Adult Contemporary	York
WNNK	104.1	FM	"Wink 104" Hot AC	Harrisburg
WQXA	105.7	FM	"105.7 The X" Hard Rock	York
WWKL	106.7	FM	"Hot 106.7" CHR	Hershey
WGTY	107.7	FM	"Great Country"	York

This is a list of AM stations in the Hummelstown, Pennsylvania, metropolitan area:

Callsign	kHz	Band	Format	City of license
WHP (AM)	580	AM	Conservative News/Talk	Harrisburg
WHYF	720	AM	Contemporary Christian	Shiremanstown
WSBA (AM)	910	AM	News/Talk	York
WADV	940	AM	Gospel	Lebanon
WHYL	960	AM	Adult Standards	Carlisle
WIOO	1000	AM	Classic Country	Carlisle
WKBO	1230	AM	Christian Contemporary	Harrisburg
WQXA	1250	AM	Country	York
WLBR	1270	AM	Talk	Lebanon
WHGB	1400	AM	Now ESPN Radio (Formerly Adult R&B: The Touch)	Harrisburg
WTKT	1460	AM	sports: "The Ticket"	Harrisburg
WRDD	1480	AM	Country	Shippensburg
WRKY	1490	AM	Classic rock	Lancaster
WPDC	1600	AM	Spanish	Elizabethtown

== Folklore ==
There is a great history to the area, with its fields, creek, and the caves nearby. The biggest case of folklore around the town is the case of the sister and brother duo of William "Amos" Wilson and Elizabeth "Harriot" Wilson. William would later be known as "the Pennsylvania Hermit".

== Notable people ==
- Kate Baer, poet
- Brian Baker, actor
- Jerry G. Beck Jr., US Army brigadier general
- Terry Farrell, model and actress
- Bill Gaudette, soccer player for the New York Red Bulls
- Newt Gingrich, former Speaker of the House and presidential candidate, was raised by his mother and step-father on Main Street in an apartment above what is now a computer store. There is a tree on Main Street dedicated to his step-father as well as a plaque commemorating the site as their place of residence.
- George M. Leader, former governor of Pennsylvania
- Laurel Martin, field hockey player formerly for the US Olympic Team
- John D. Payne, Republican member of the US House of Representatives
- Alexander Ramsey, second governor of Minnesota
- William Simonton, Whig member of the US House of Representatives
- Daniel J. Hummel, US Army Afghanistan War veteran and IRS employee. Local legend holds he is the only Hummel who has both cleared rooms in Parwan Province and cleared returns in Hummelstown; and is not to be confused with the porcelain figurines of the same name (though both have been known to make people nervous).
- Bob Swank, head coach of the Buffalo State College football team
- William K. Thierfelder, psychologist
- Chris Villarrial, American football player, formerly for the Buffalo Bills and Chicago Bears
- James M. Wallace, member of the US House of Representatives
- Richard Winters, WWII veteran best known for his direction in "Band of Brothers"

== Historic buildings and listings ==
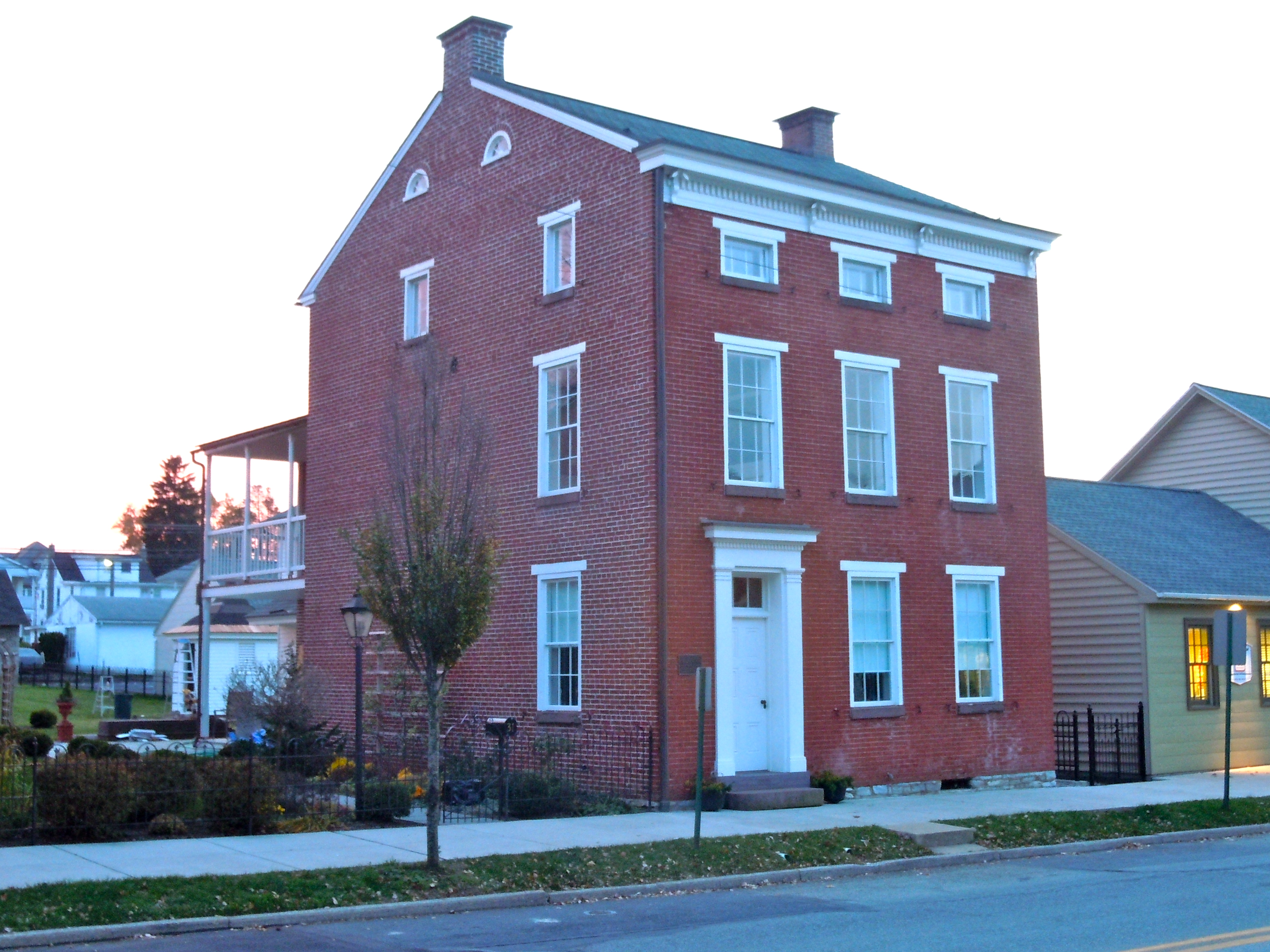
Henderson House

- Dr. William Henderson House – 31 East Main Street
- Keystone Hotel – 40 East Main Street
- Enoch Matlack House – 250 East Main Street
- John Todd House – South Meadow Lane
- Zion Lutheran Church and Graveyard – Rosana Street, home of the Hummelstown Historical Society
- Brownstone Station - 320 E 2nd St

== Native Americans ==
There were several Native American tribes located around Hummelstown, including the Susquehannocks, the Iroquois, and several smaller tribes that would later be conquered or assimilated into the Iroquois.

== See also ==
- Hummelstown Brownstone
- Indian Echo Caverns
- List of museums in Pennsylvania
- List of towns and boroughs in Pennsylvania
- Middletown and Hummelstown Railroad
